= Park Hill =

Park Hill, Parkhill, or Park Hills may refer to:

== People ==
- Allan Parkhill (1912–1986), New Zealand rugby player
- Archdale Parkhill (1878–1947), Australian politician
- Barry Parkhill (b. 1951), American basketball player
- Bruce Parkhill (b. 1949), American basketball player
- Charles B. Parkhill (1859–1933), Justice of the Florida Supreme Court
- Douglas Parkhill, Canadian technologist and former research minister
- John Parkhill (disambiguation), several people
- Julian Parkhill (b. 1964), British microbiologist
- Lee Parkhill (b. 1988), Canadian sailor

== Places ==
=== United Kingdom ===
- Park Hill, Lincolnshire, a hill of 139m
- Park Hill, Sheffield, a listed housing estate in Sheffield, England
- Park Hill Recreation Ground, a park in London Borough of Croydon, England
- Parkhill railway station, formerly in Aberdeenshire

=== Canada ===
- Parkhill, Ontario, a community in Middlesex County, Ontario, Canada.
- Parkhill/Stanley Park, Calgary, a neighbourhood in Calgary, Alberta

=== United States – settlements ===
- Park Hill, Arkansas, in Pulaski County, Arkansas
- Park Hill, Denver, a neighborhood in Denver, Colorado, listed on the National Register of Historic Places (NRHP)
- Park Hill, Louisville, a neighborhood in Louisville, Kentucky
- Parkhill, Pennsylvania, a community in Cambria County, Pennsylvania.
- Park Hill, Oklahoma
- Park Hill, Yonkers, a neighborhood in Yonkers, New York
- Park Hill (Lincoln, Nebraska), listed on the NRHP in Lancaster County
- Park Hill Historic District, North Little Rock, Arkansas, listed on the NRHP in Pulaski County
- Park Hill (Paris, Arkansas), listed on the NRHP in Logan County
- Park Hill School District, Missouri, in the Kansas City metropolitan area
- Clifton, Staten Island, New York, a section of which is called Park Hill

=== United States – geographic features ===
- Park Hills, Kentucky
- Park Hills, Missouri
- Park Hills (Montana), a mountain range in Montana

== Companies and organizations ==
- Park Hill Group, part of the PJT Partners investment bank

== See also ==
- Hillpark (disambiguation)
