= Paris Commercial Historic District =

Paris Commercial Historic District may refer to:

- Paris Commercial Historic District (Paris, Arkansas), listed on the National Register of Historic Places in Logan County, Arkansas
- Paris Commercial Historic District (Paris, Tennessee), listed on the National Register of Historic Places in Henry County, Tennessee
- Paris Commercial Historic District (Paris, Texas), listed on the National Register of Historic Places in Lamar County, Texas
