= Short Mountain Creek Bridge =

- U.S. National Register of Historic Places
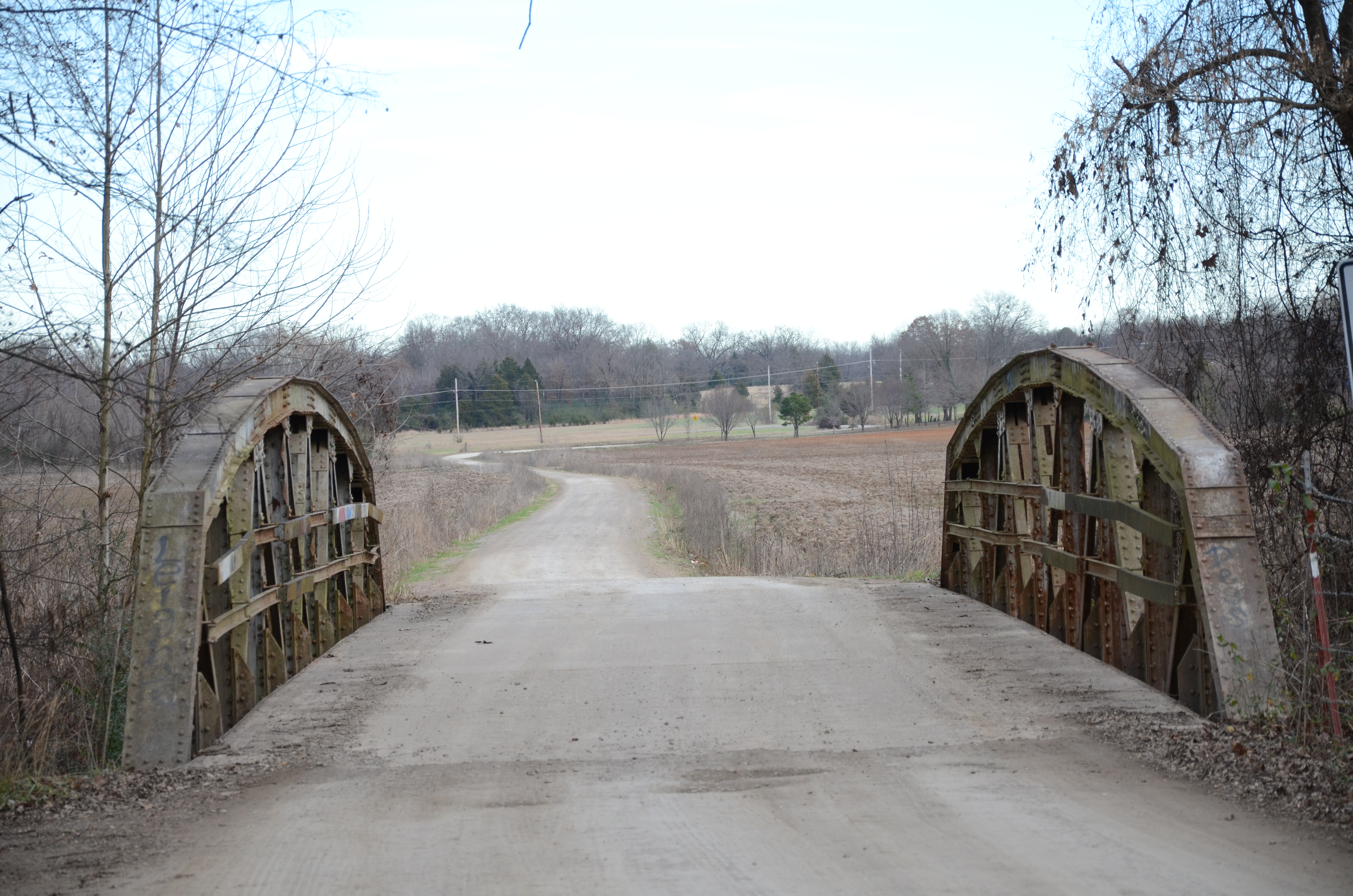

- Location within Arkansas Location within the United States
- Location: County Road 64 (Short Mountain Road), near Paris, Arkansas
- Coordinates: 35°18′41″N 93°44′37″W
- Area: less than one acre
- Built: 1928
- Built by: Virginia Bridge & Iron Co. of Tenn.
- Architectural style: Parker pony truss
- MPS: Historic Bridges of Arkansas MPS
- NRHP reference No.: 04001039
- Added to NRHP: September 24, 2004

The Short Mountain Creek Bridge carries Short Mountain Road across Short Mountain Creek, northwest of Paris, Arkansas. It is a single-span Parker pony truss bridge, with a span measuring 92 feet (28 m) and a total structure length of 93 feet (28 m). It has a deck surface of concrete that is 21.7 feet (6.6 m) wide. It was built in 1928 by the Virginia Bridge Company of Tennessee, and is the only bridge of this type in the area.

The bridge was listed on the National Register of Historic Places in 2004.

== See also ==
- National Register of Historic Places listings in Logan County, Arkansas
- List of bridges on the National Register of Historic Places in Arkansas
