= Methodist Episcopal Church, South (Paris, Arkansas) =

Historic church in Arkansas, United States

- U.S. National Register of Historic Places
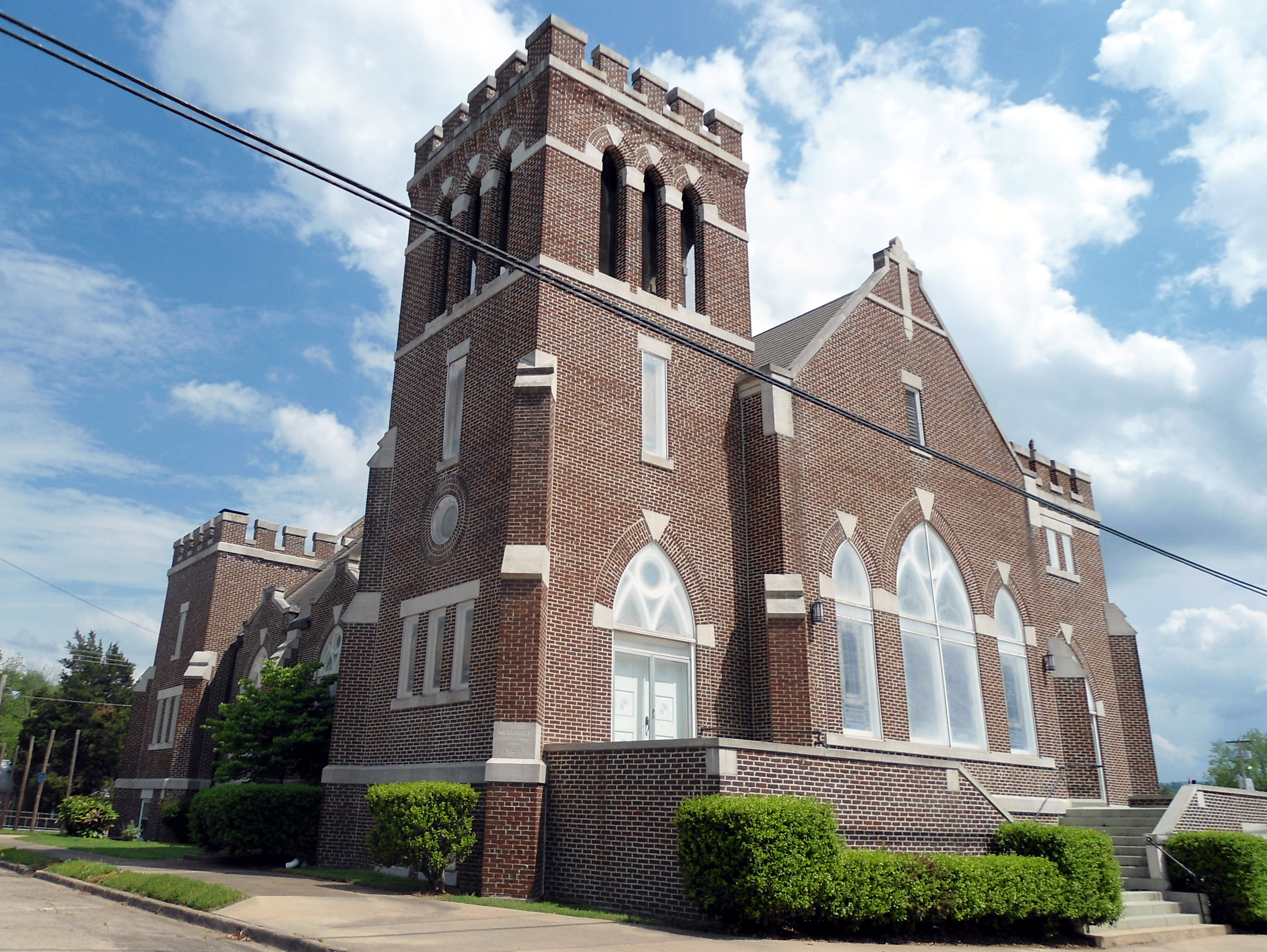

- Location within Arkansas Location within the United States
- Location: 205 N. Elm St., Paris, Arkansas
- Coordinates: 35°17′38″N 93°43′46″W
- Area: 2 acres (0.81 ha)
- Built: 1917
- Architectural style: Late Gothic Revival
- NRHP reference No.: 95000757
- Added to NRHP: June 20, 1995

The First United Methodist Church, originally the Methodist Episcopal Church, South is a historic church building at 205 North Elm Street in Paris, Arkansas. It is a two-story brick building with Late Gothic Revival styling, built between 1917 and 1928 for a congregation founded in the early 1870s. It is the congregation's fourth sanctuary, its first three having succumbed to fire. It has a gabled roof with corner sections and a tower topped by crenellated parapets.

The church was listed on the National Register of Historic Places in 1995.

== See also ==
- National Register of Historic Places listings in Logan County, Arkansas
