= Farmers and Merchants Bank-Masonic Lodge =

- U.S. National Register of Historic Places
- U.S. Historic district – Contributing property
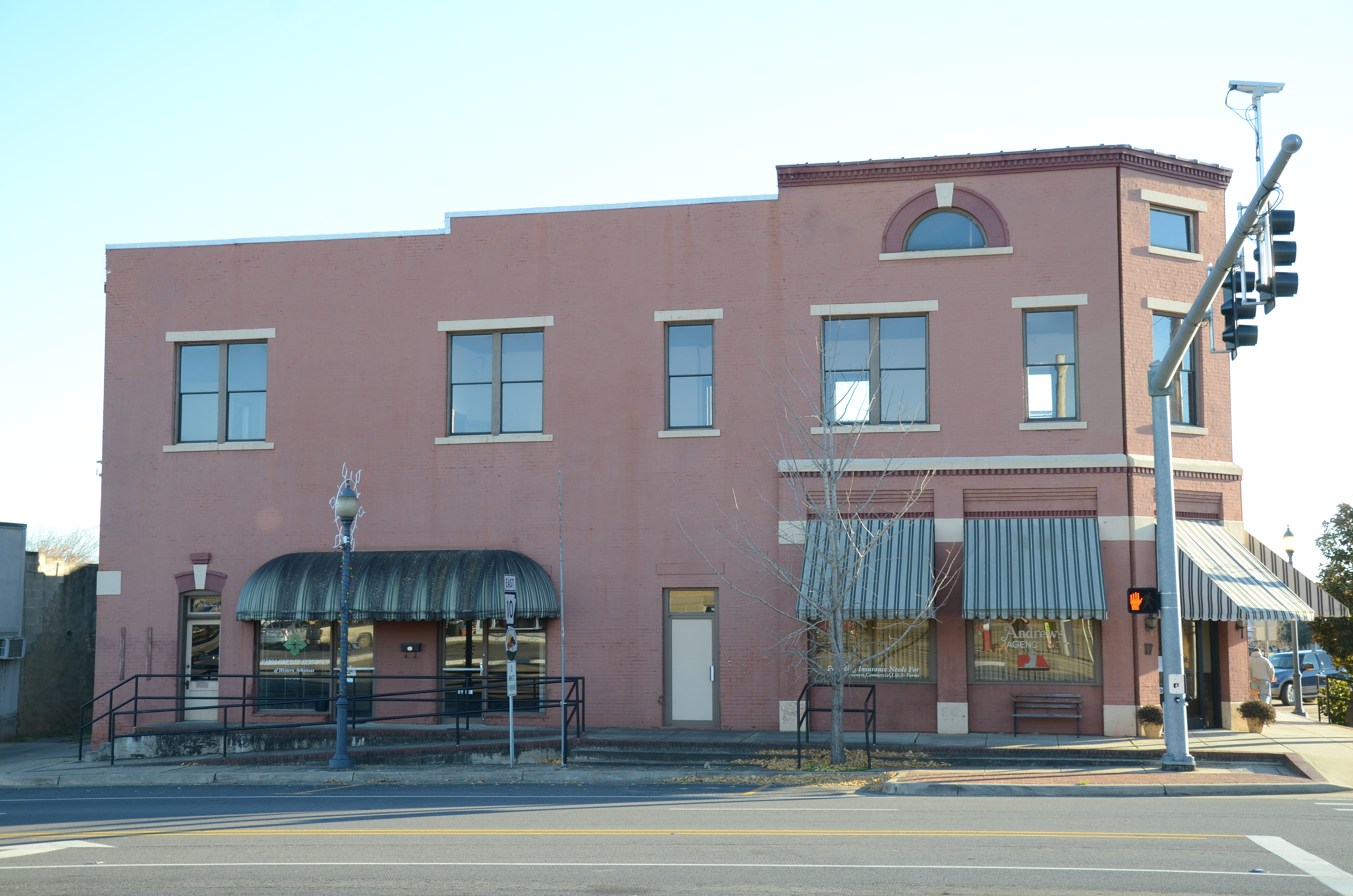

- Location within Arkansas Location within the United States
- Location: 288 N. Broadway, Booneville, Arkansas
- Coordinates: 35°8′24″N 93°55′17″W
- Area: 0.9 acres (0.36 ha)
- Architectural style: Colonial Revival, Early Commercial
- Part of: Booneville Commercial Historic District (ID13000351)
- NRHP reference No.: 93001257

Significant dates
- Added to NRHP: November 19, 1993
- Designated CP: June 4, 2013

The Farmers and Merchants Bank-Masonic Lodge a is historic commercial and fraternal building at 288 North Broadway in Booneville, Arkansas. It is a two-story structure that features Colonial Revival and Early Commercial architectural styles. It was added to the National Register of Historic Places in 1993.

The building originally hosted a bank on the first floor and a Masonic meeting hall on the second floor. The cornerstone indicates the Masonic association, though it does not mention the bank. The local Masonic lodge met there from 1906 to 1985.

== See also ==
- National Register of Historic Places listings in Logan County, Arkansas
