= Tolbert E. Gill House =

Historic house in Arkansas, United States

- U.S. National Register of Historic Places
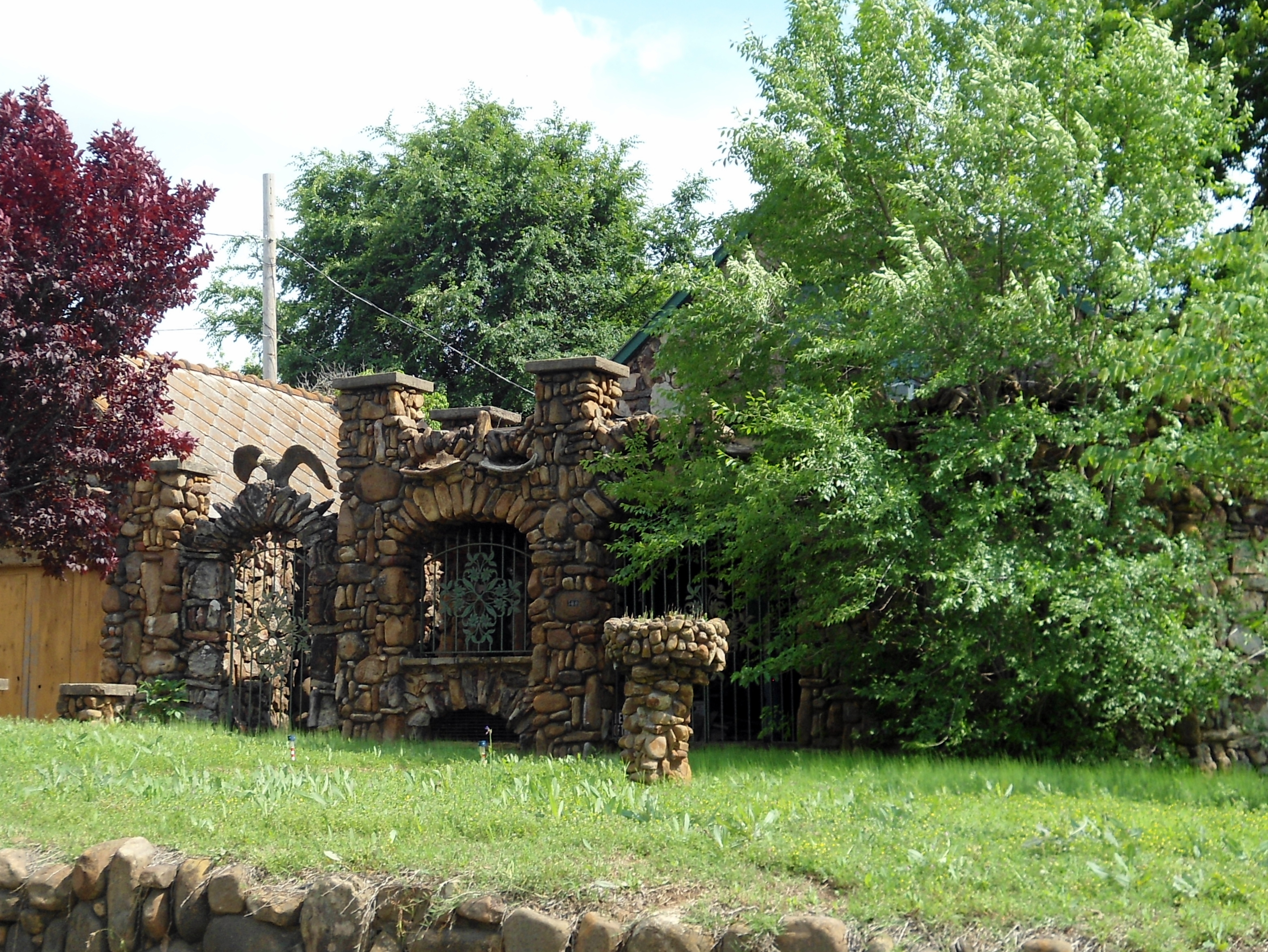

- Location within Arkansas Location within the United States
- Location: S. Spruce Street, S of AR 22, Paris, Arkansas
- Coordinates: 35°17′31″N 93°44′0″W
- Area: less than one acre
- Architect: Tolbert E. Gill
- Architectural style: Rustic
- NRHP reference No.: 93001024
- Added to NRHP: September 30, 1993

The Tolbert E. Gill House is a historic house on the west side of South Spruce Street, just south of Arkansas Highway 22 in Paris, Arkansas. It is a single-story masonry structure, built of out rusticated stone by its first owner, stonemason Tolbert E. Gill. It is an architecturally unique and distinctive structure, with arched openings topped by castellated parapets. The yard is further adorned with stone artwork created by Gill, who is believed to be either a German immigrant or the son of German immigrants. Construction on the house began in 1920, and took about 15 years to achieve its present configuration.

The house was listed on the National Register of Historic Places in 1993.

== See also ==
- National Register of Historic Places listings in Logan County, Arkansas
