= Evelyn Gill Walker House =

Historic house in Arkansas, United States

- U.S. National Register of Historic Places
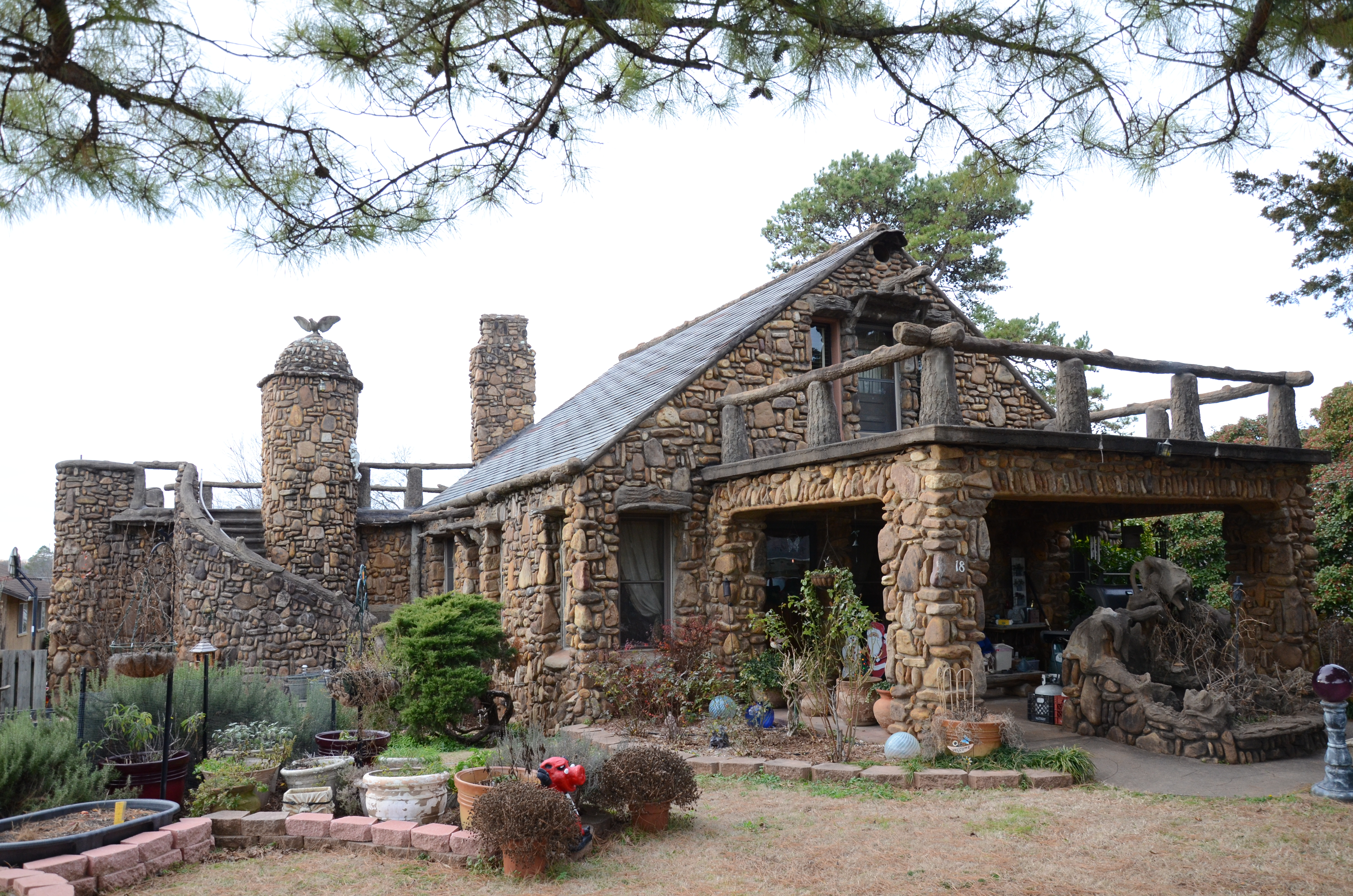

- Location within Arkansas Location within the United States
- Location: 18 S. Spruce St., Paris, Arkansas
- Coordinates: 35°17′30″N 93°44′0″W
- Area: less than one acre
- Built by: Tolbert E. Gill
- Architectural style: Rustic
- NRHP reference No.: 93000985
- Added to NRHP: September 16, 1993

The Evelyn Gill Walker House is a historic house at 18 South Spruce Street in Paris, Arkansas. Built by mason Tolbert E. Gill over a several-year period beginning in 1938, it is a distinctive example of Gill's Rustic style, with a stone veneer exterior and decorative components. It has a 1 1/2-story gabled main section, with a flat-roof porch in front, and a flat-roof ell in the rear. The ell features a turret with a bell-cast top, with a surrounding curved staircase leading to an open deck on the ell's roof.

The house was listed on the National Register of Historic Places in 1993.

== See also ==
- National Register of Historic Places listings in Logan County, Arkansas
