= Smith Hospital =

- U.S. National Register of Historic Places
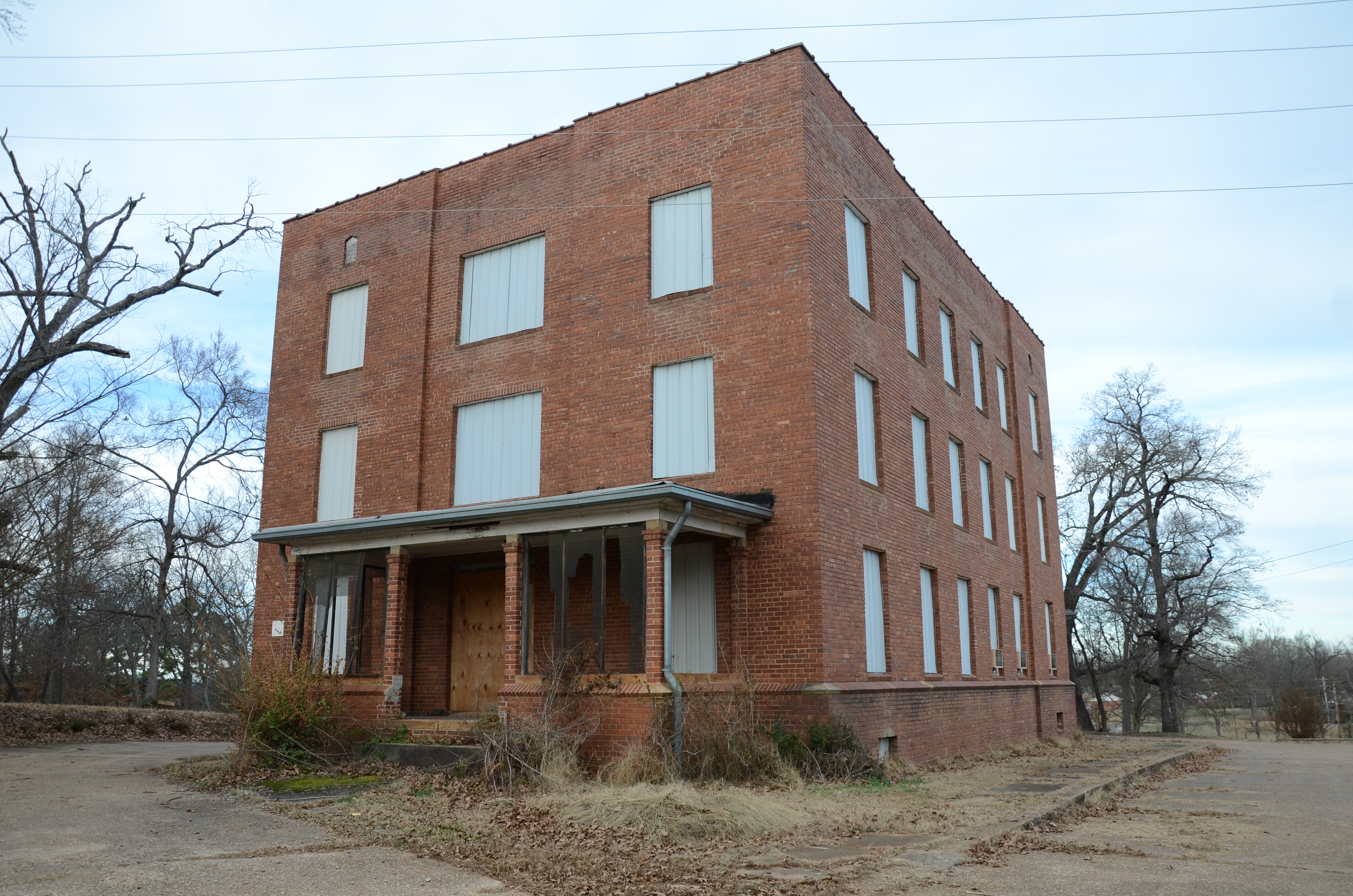

- Location within Arkansas Location within the United States
- Location: N terminus of Express St., Paris, Arkansas
- Coordinates: 35°17′53″N 93°43′50″W
- Area: 0.4 acres (0.16 ha)
- Built: 1913
- Architect: Dawson, Charles; Multiple
- Architectural style: Colonial Revival, Bungalow/craftsman, Plain Traditional
- NRHP reference No.: 94000369
- Added to NRHP: April 11, 1994

Smith Hospital is a former medical facility in Paris, Arkansas, located at the northern end of Express Street. Built in 1913 and enlarged in 1926, it was the first hospital in Logan County. It consists of an original two-story brick building, to which a three-story annex was added in 1926. Its interior finishes reflect alterations made in 1926. It served as the local hospital until 1971.

The building was listed on the National Register of Historic Places in 1994.

== See also ==
- National Register of Historic Places listings in Logan County, Arkansas
