= Saint Anthony's Catholic Church (Ratcliff, Arkansas) =

Historic church in Arkansas, United States

- U.S. National Register of Historic Places
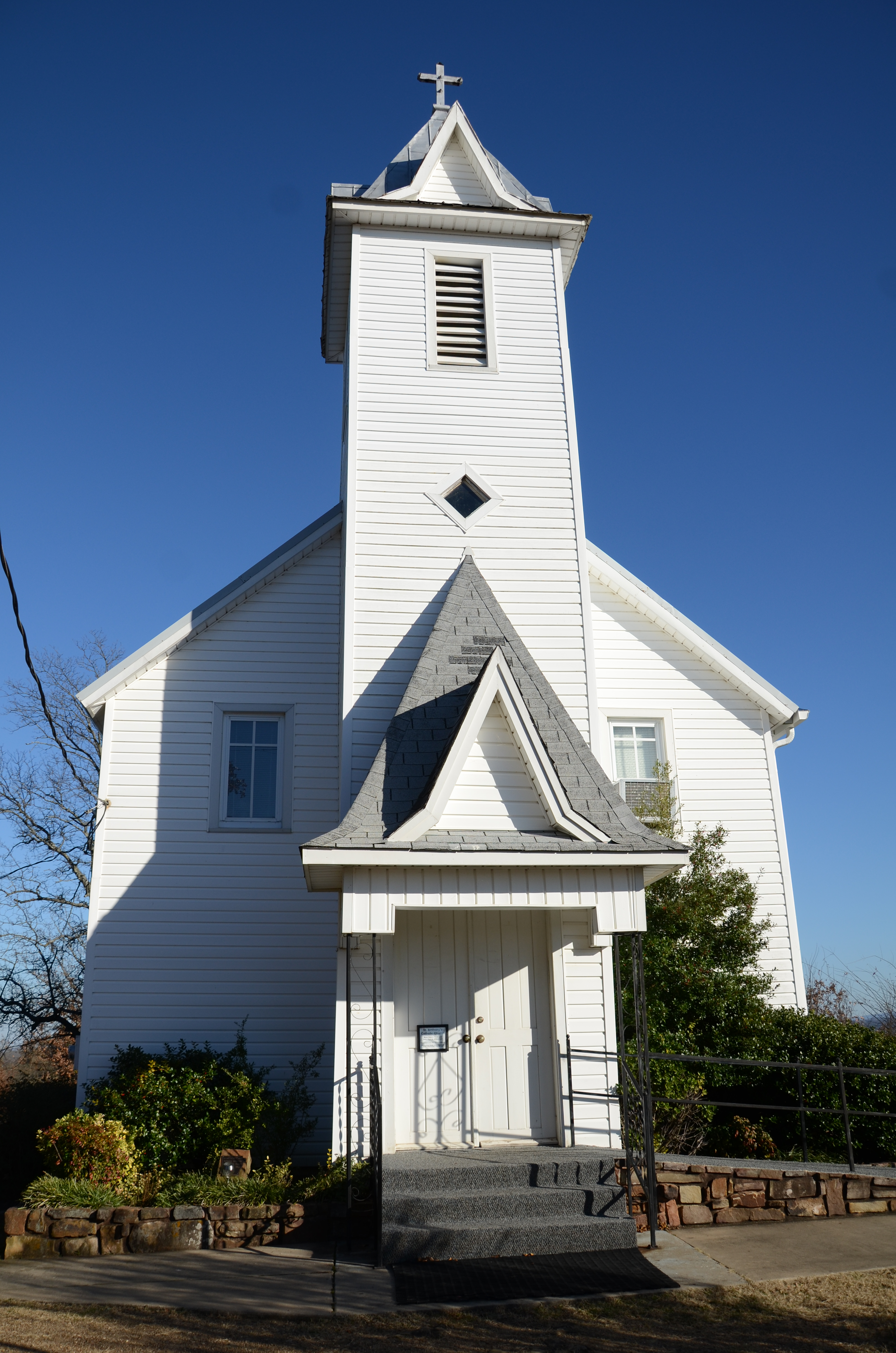

- Location within Arkansas Location within the United States
- Location: 470 N. Wilson Ave., Ratcliff, Arkansas
- Coordinates: 35°18′48″N 93°52′55″W
- Area: less than one acre
- Built: 1903
- NRHP reference No.: 86001885
- Added to NRHP: August 21, 1986

Saint Anthony's Catholic Church is a historic church building at 470 North Wilson Avenue, just north of the crossroads community of Ratcliff, Arkansas. It is a single-story wood-frame structure, with a gabled roof and weatherboard siding. A square tower projects from the center of the main facade, capped by a pyramidal roof and cross, with gablets on each side. The main entrance is at the center of the tower, sheltered by a hood with a similar style as the tower roof. The church was built in 1903 under the auspices of the local Subiaco Abbey as a mission serving arriving German Catholic immigrants.

The church was listed on the National Register of Historic Places in 1986.

== See also ==
- National Register of Historic Places listings in Logan County, Arkansas
