= First Christian Church (Paris, Arkansas) =

Historic church in Arkansas, United States

- U.S. National Register of Historic Places
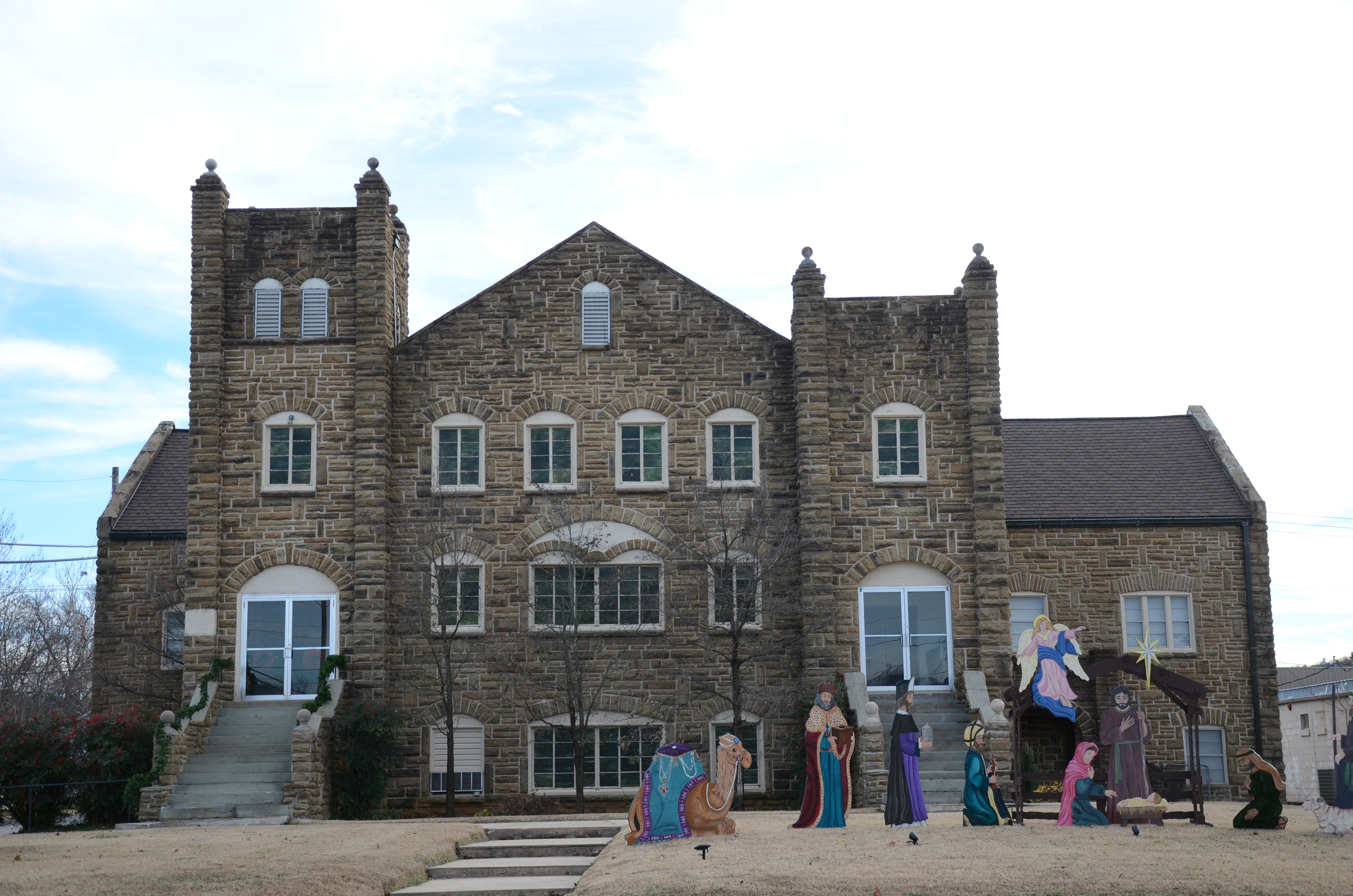

- Location within Arkansas Location within the United States
- Location: 120 E. Walnut St., Paris, Arkansas
- Coordinates: 35°17′29″N 93°43′41″W
- Area: 1 acre (0.40 ha)
- Built: 1930
- Architectural style: Romanesque, Late Gothic Revival
- NRHP reference No.: 95000791
- Added to NRHP: June 30, 1995

The First Christian Church is a historic church at 120 East Walnut Street in Paris, Arkansas. It is a T-shaped single-story building, constructed out of stone and concrete between 1930 and 1936 for a congregation of the Disciples of Christ organized about 1890. It is the congregation's second church, the first having been severely damaged by a storm in 1929. It is locally distinctive for its architecture, a basically Collegiate Gothic form with Romanesque details.

The building was listed on the National Register of Historic Places in 1995.

== See also ==
- National Register of Historic Places listings in Logan County, Arkansas
