= Union Church and School (Paris, Arkansas) =

- U.S. National Register of Historic Places
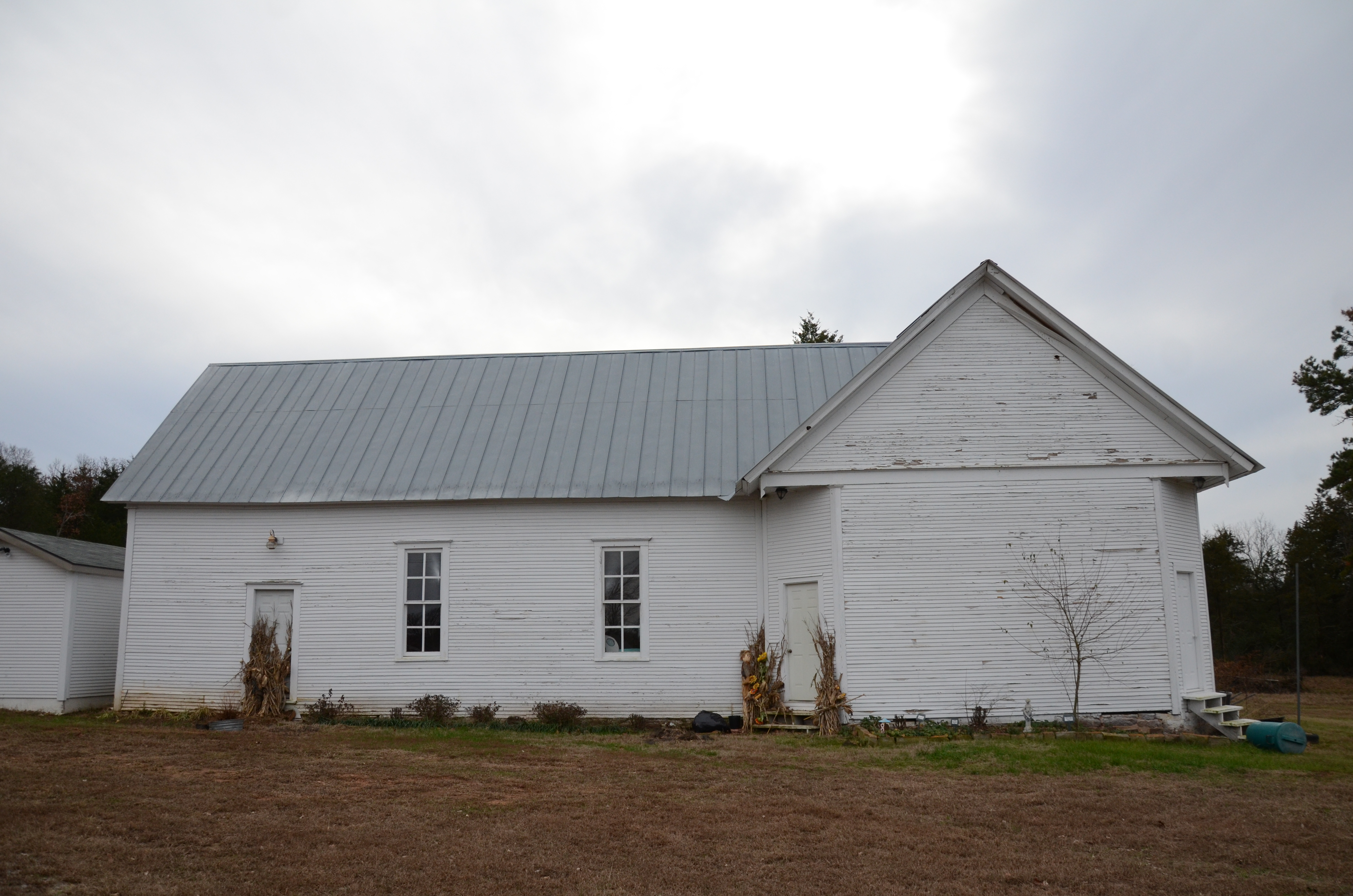

- Location within Arkansas Location within the United States
- Nearest city: Paris, Arkansas
- Coordinates: 35°19′31″N 93°39′53″W
- Area: 4 acres (1.6 ha)
- Built: 1895
- Architectural style: Plain Traditional
- NRHP reference No.: 05000497
- Added to NRHP: June 1, 2005

The Union Church and School is a historic combination church and school in rural Logan County, Arkansas. It is located northeast of Paris, on the south side of Union Road at its junction with Clayton Lane. It is a vernacular single-story L-shaped wood-frame structure, with a gabled roof, weatherboard siding, and a stone foundation. The right side of the building, a cross-gable section, was built about 1895, and the left portion was built about 1922. It served the surrounding community as a two-room school until 1948, and as a Presbyterian church until 1958.

The building was listed on the National Register of Historic Places in 2005.

== See also ==
- National Register of Historic Places listings in Logan County, Arkansas
