= Old Logan County Jail =

- U.S. National Register of Historic Places
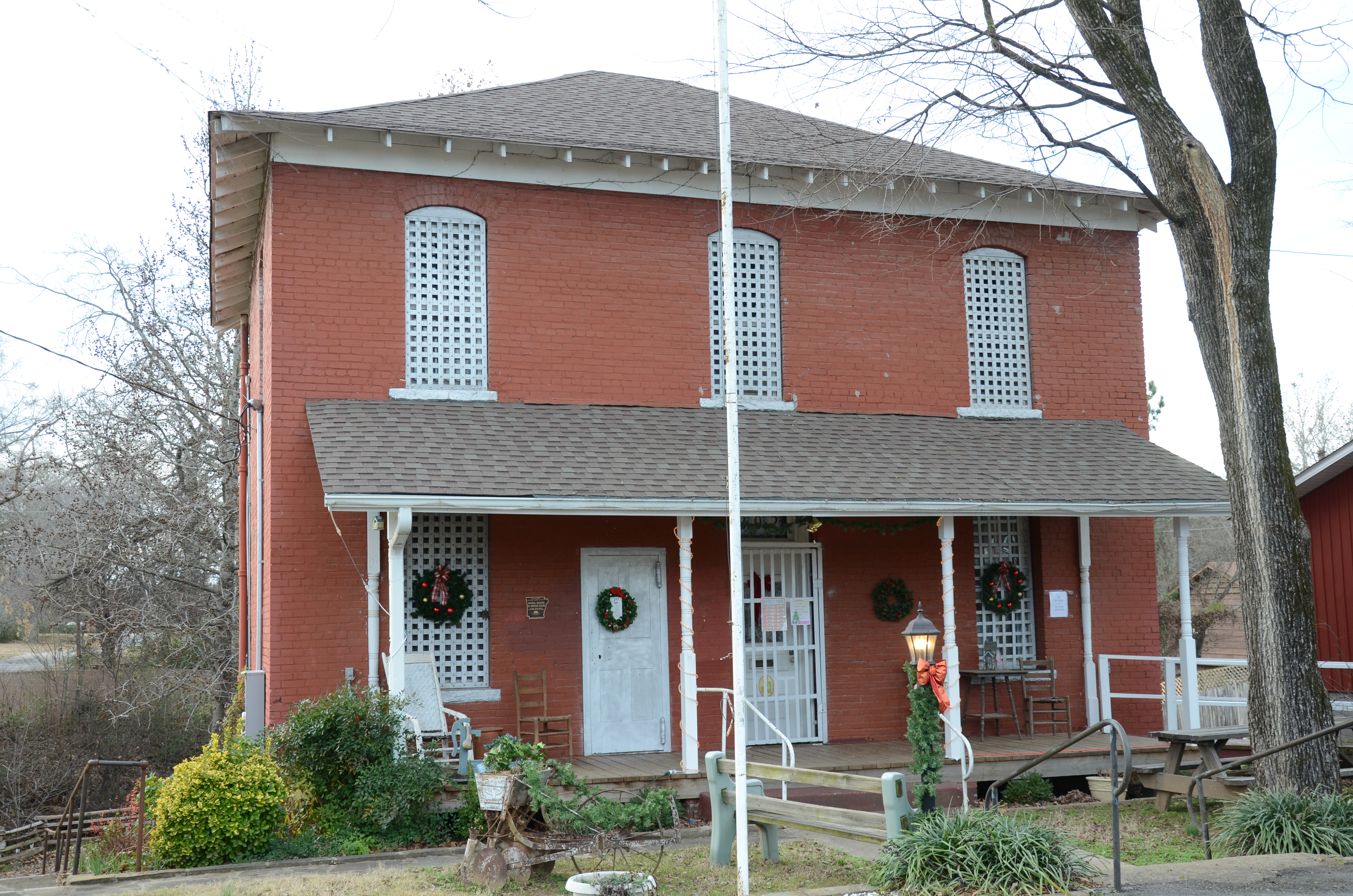

- Location within Arkansas Location within the United States
- Location: 202 N. Vine St., Paris, Arkansas
- Coordinates: 35°17′37″N 93°43′54″W
- Area: less than one acre
- Built: 1903
- Built by: Anthony Hall
- Architectural style: Italianate
- NRHP reference No.: 93001254
- Added to NRHP: November 19, 1993

The Old Logan County Jail is a historic government building at 202 North Vine Street in Paris, Arkansas. It is a two-story brick building, covered by a hip roof with exposed rafter ends. Its main facade has a single-story porch extending across the front. Windows are set in segmented-arch openings, with strap-metal bars set across them in a crosshatch pattern. There are two entrances, one (without bars) for the jailer's quarters, and one with bars that provides access to the cell block. Built in 1903, it is one of the state's best-preserved early 20th-century county jails. It is the site of the last legal hanging in Arkansas, which took place when John Arthur Tillman, 23, was hung on July 15, 1914, at 7 am for the murder of Amanda Jane Stephens, 19.

The jail was listed on the National Register of Historic Places in 1993.

== See also ==
- National Register of Historic Places listings in Logan County, Arkansas
