= Paris Post Office =

- U.S. National Register of Historic Places
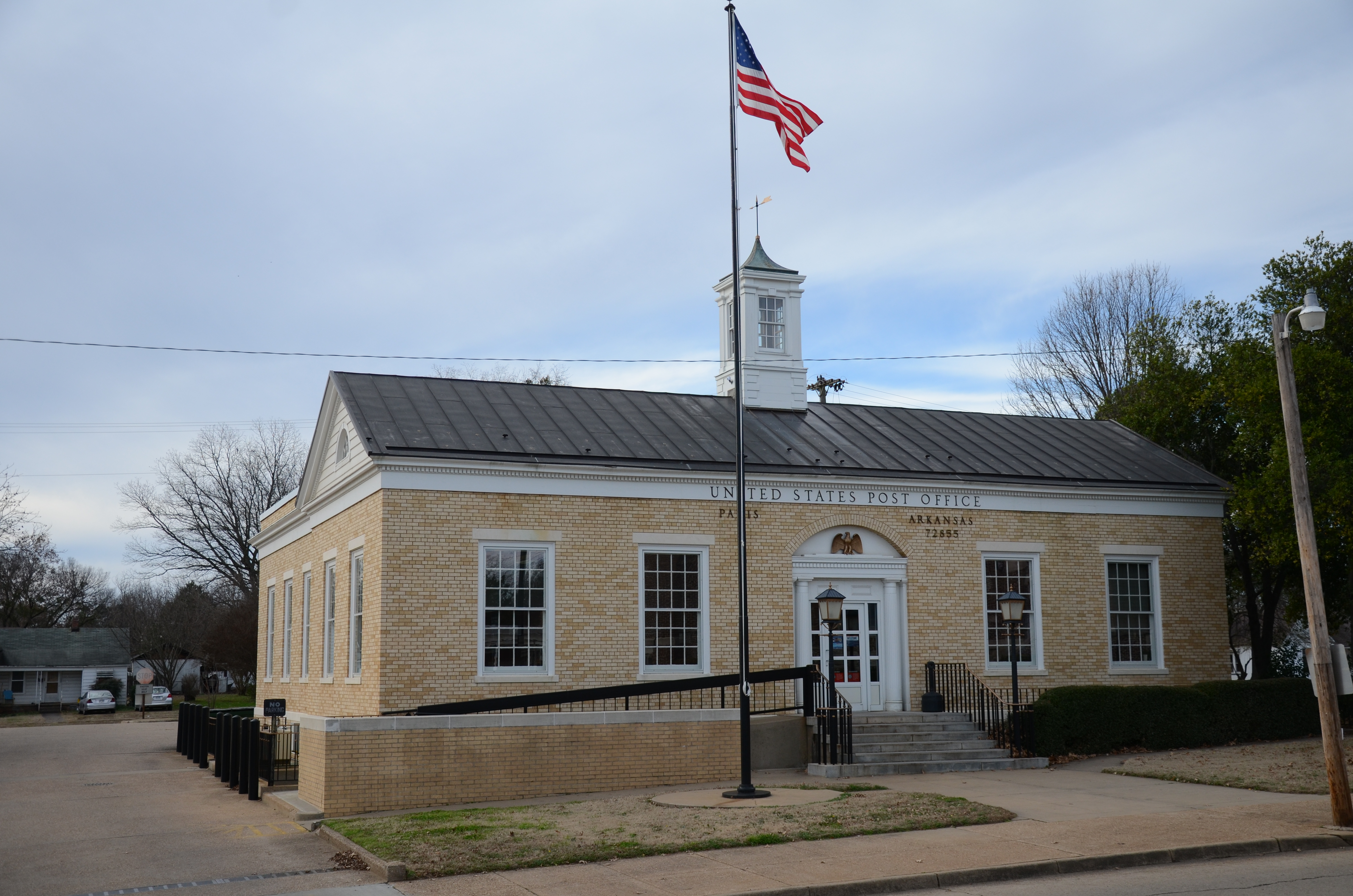

- Location within Arkansas Location within the United States
- Location: 206 N. Elm St., Paris, Arkansas
- Coordinates: 35°17′39″N 93°43′47″W
- Area: less than one acre
- Built: 1938
- Architect: Joseph P. Vorst, et al.
- Architectural style: Colonial Revival
- MPS: Post Offices with Section Art in Arkansas MPS
- NRHP reference No.: 98000923
- Added to NRHP: August 14, 1998

The Paris Post Office is located at 206 North Elm Street in downtown Paris, Arkansas. It is located in a modest Colonial Revival building, built in 1937 as part of a major federal building project. It is notable for the controversy over its interior artwork, which was funded by the Treasury Department's Section of Fine Arts, and executed by Joseph P. Vorst. The murals proposed by Vorst depicted a raggedly dressed African-American with several skinny mules, approaching a tarpaper shack that appears to be the man's home. There was public outcry, with Vorst defending the depiction as an accurate rendition of the area during a visit he made. He then submitted an alternate drawing, which showed a stock farm, cotton gin, and other more benign imagery, which was accepted.

The building was listed on the National Register of Historic Places in 1998.

== See also ==
- National Register of Historic Places listings in Logan County, Arkansas
- List of United States post offices
- United States post office murals
