= Little Rock to Cantonment Gibson Road-Short Mountain Segment =

- U.S. National Register of Historic Places
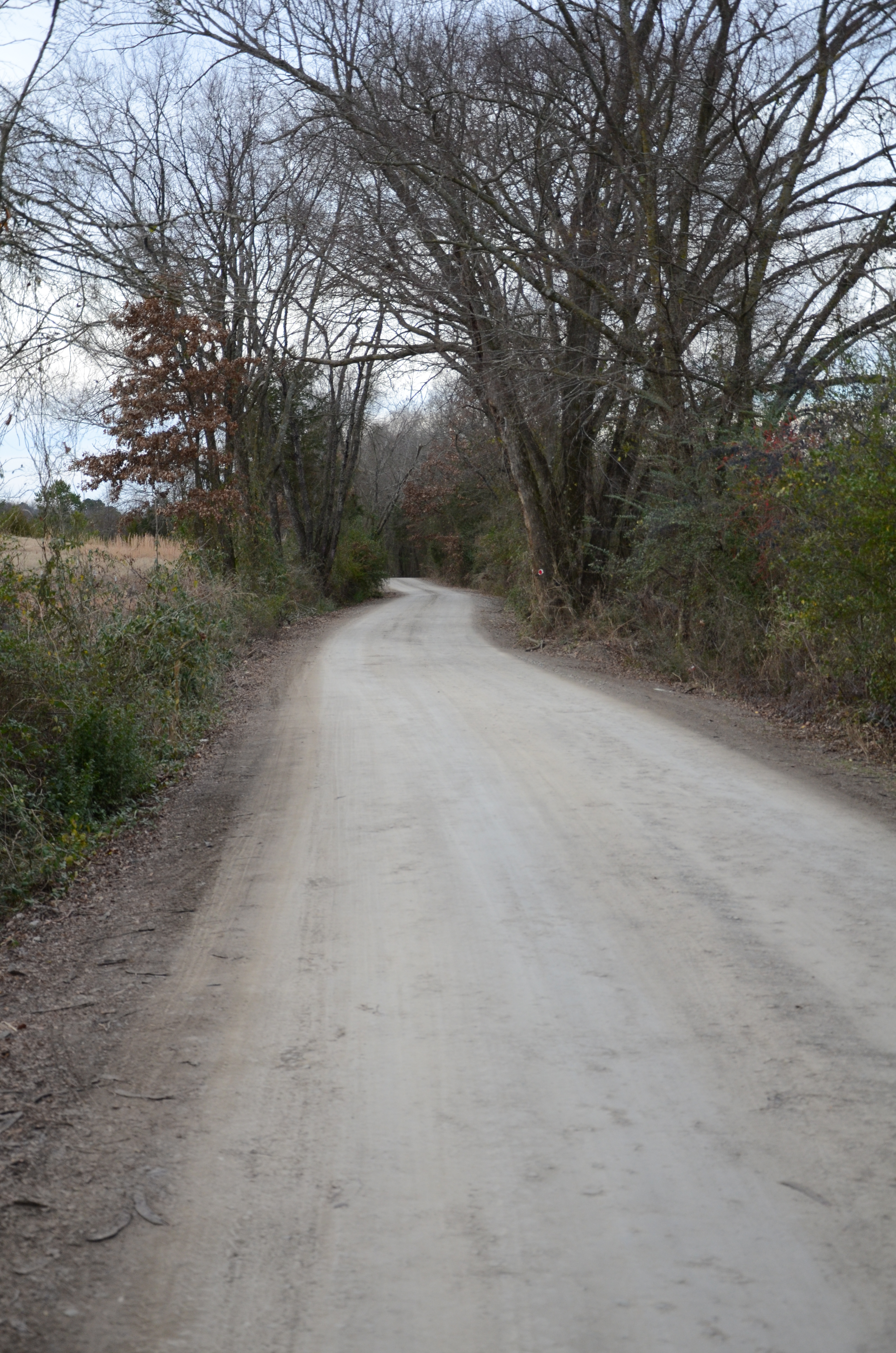

- Location within Arkansas Location within the United States
- Nearest city: Paris, Arkansas
- Coordinates: 35°18′41″N 93°44′39″W
- Area: 11 acres (4.5 ha)
- Built: 1826
- Built by: Hixson, Thomas
- NRHP reference No.: 07001429
- Added to NRHP: January 24, 2008

The Little Rock to Cantonment Gibson Road-Short Mountain Segment is a historic 19th-century road section in Logan County, Arkansas. It is located northwest of Paris, consisting of 3.7 miles (6.0 km) of Short Mountain Road, extending westward from its crossing with Short Mountain Creek. The roadbed is about 12 feet (3.7 m) wide, and is heavily banked for much of its length. Built in 1828, it was originally part of the military road connecting Little Rock, Arkansas to what is now Gibson, Oklahoma (then just a military base). The road has been documented to be part of the Trail of Tears migration route.

The road section was listed on the National Register of Historic Places in 2008.

== See also ==
- National Register of Historic Places listings in Logan County, Arkansas
