= Paris Commercial Historic District (Paris, Arkansas) =

Historic district in Arkansas, United States

- U.S. National Register of Historic Places
- U.S. Historic district
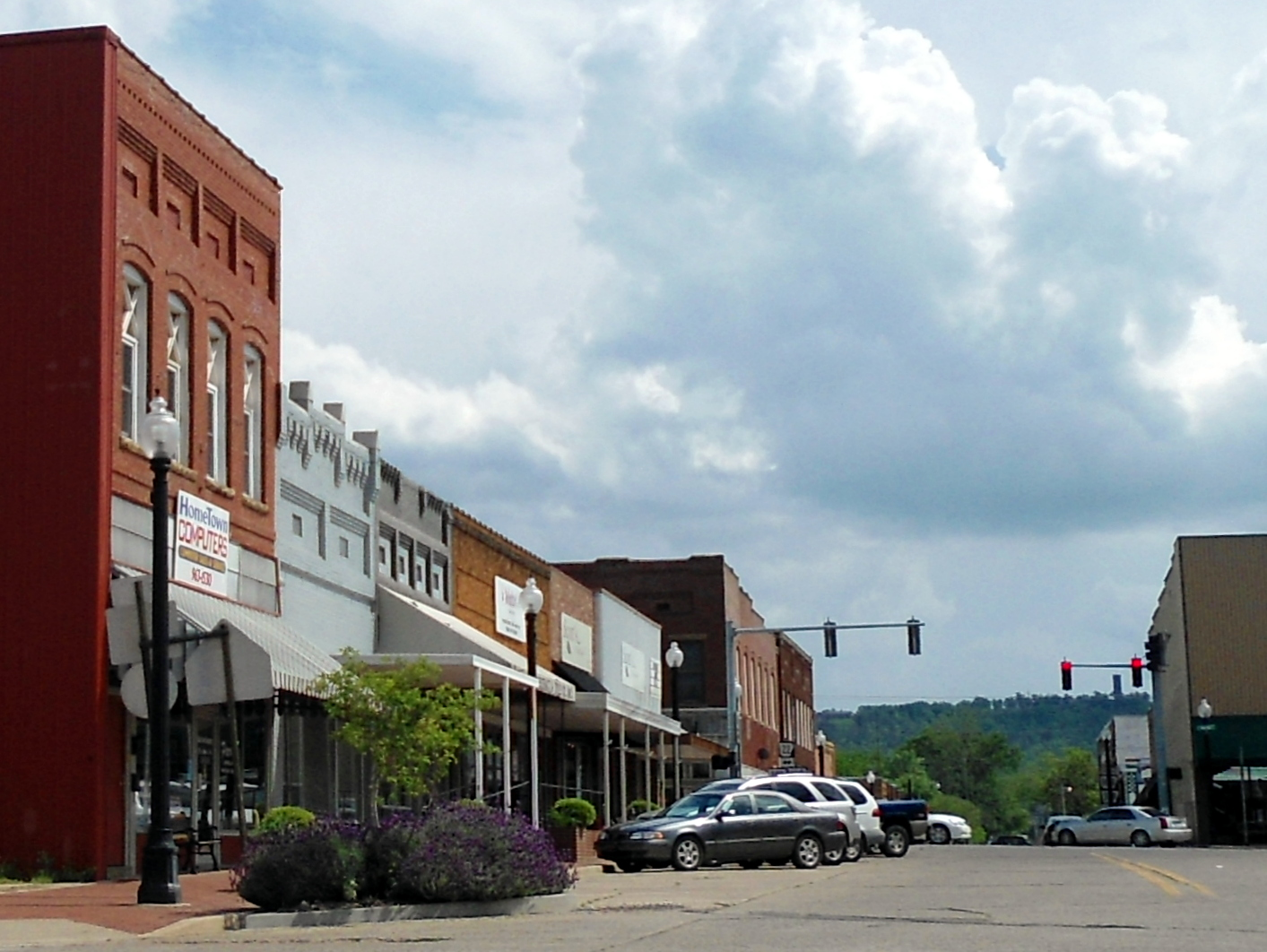

- Location within Arkansas Location within the United States
- Location: roughly bounded by N. Express, Short Mountain, N. First, E. Pine, E. and W. Academy Sts., Paris, Arkansas
- Coordinates: 35°17′31″N 93°43′48″W
- Area: 13 acres (5.3 ha)
- Built: 1879
- Architectural style: Romanesque, Classical Revival
- NRHP reference No.: 09000314
- Added to NRHP: May 12, 2009

The Paris Commercial Historic District encompasses much of the commercial heart of downtown Paris, Arkansas. Centered on the courthouse square, where the Logan County Courthouse, Eastern District is located, the district contains a well-preserved collection of mainly commercial architecture from the turn of the 20th century. The district includes the buildings facing the courthouse square, as well as additional buildings extending down South Express and South Elm Streets, and the cross streets between them.

The district was listed on the National Register of Historic Places in 2009.

== See also ==
- National Register of Historic Places listings in Logan County, Arkansas
