= Mount Salem Church and School =

Historic church in Arkansas, United States

- U.S. National Register of Historic Places
- Location within Arkansas Location within the United States
- Location: 553 Mt. Salem Rd. #101, southwest of Paris, Arkansas
- Coordinates: 35°12′52″N 93°34′57″W
- Built: 1909
- NRHP reference No.: 100002452
- Added to NRHP: May 22, 2018

The Mount Salem Church and School is a historic building at 553 Mt. Salem Rd. #101 in rural Logan County, Arkansas, about 15 miles (24 km) southwest of Paris. It is a single-story wood-frame structure, with a gabled roof and clapboarded exterior. Along with the adjacent cemetery, it is the only major surviving element of the Mount Salem community, which flourished in the late 19th and early 20th centuries. This building was constructed by the community in 1909–10, and was the third building on the site. All of them served as both a church and local school.

The building was listed on the National Register of Historic Places in 2018.

== See also ==
- National Register of Historic Places listings in Logan County, Arkansas
