= John Gabriel Fort House =

Historic house in Arkansas, United States

- U.S. National Register of Historic Places
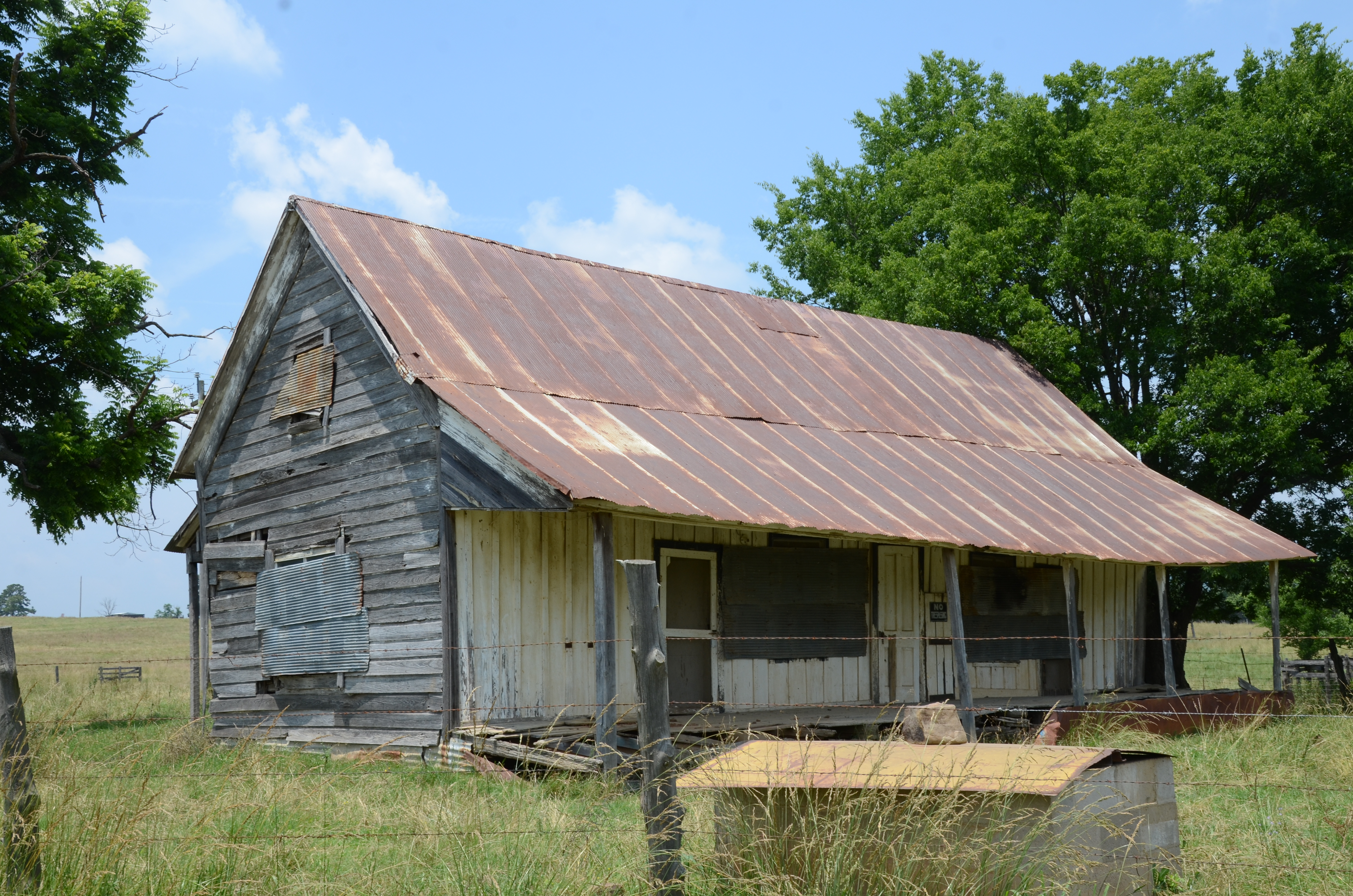

- Location within Arkansas Location within the United States
- Nearest city: Driggs, Arkansas
- Coordinates: 35°12′26″N 93°44′5″W
- Area: less than one acre
- Built: 1848
- Architectural style: Saddlebag
- NRHP reference No.: 96000331
- Added to NRHP: March 28, 1996

The John Gabriel Fort House is a historic house in rural Logan County, Arkansas. It is located at a bend in Reveille Valley Road, roughly midway between Paris and Magazine. It is a single-story structure, consisting of two log pens joined by a side gable roof, with a frame addition extending to the rear. The logs have been hand-hewn square, and are joined by dovetail notches. Built about 1848, it is one of the county's oldest buildings, and is its best example of a "saddlebag" style house.

The house was listed on the National Register of Historic Places in 1996.

== See also ==
- National Register of Historic Places listings in Logan County, Arkansas
