= Booneville Methodist Episcopal Church South =

Historic church in Arkansas, United States

- U.S. National Register of Historic Places
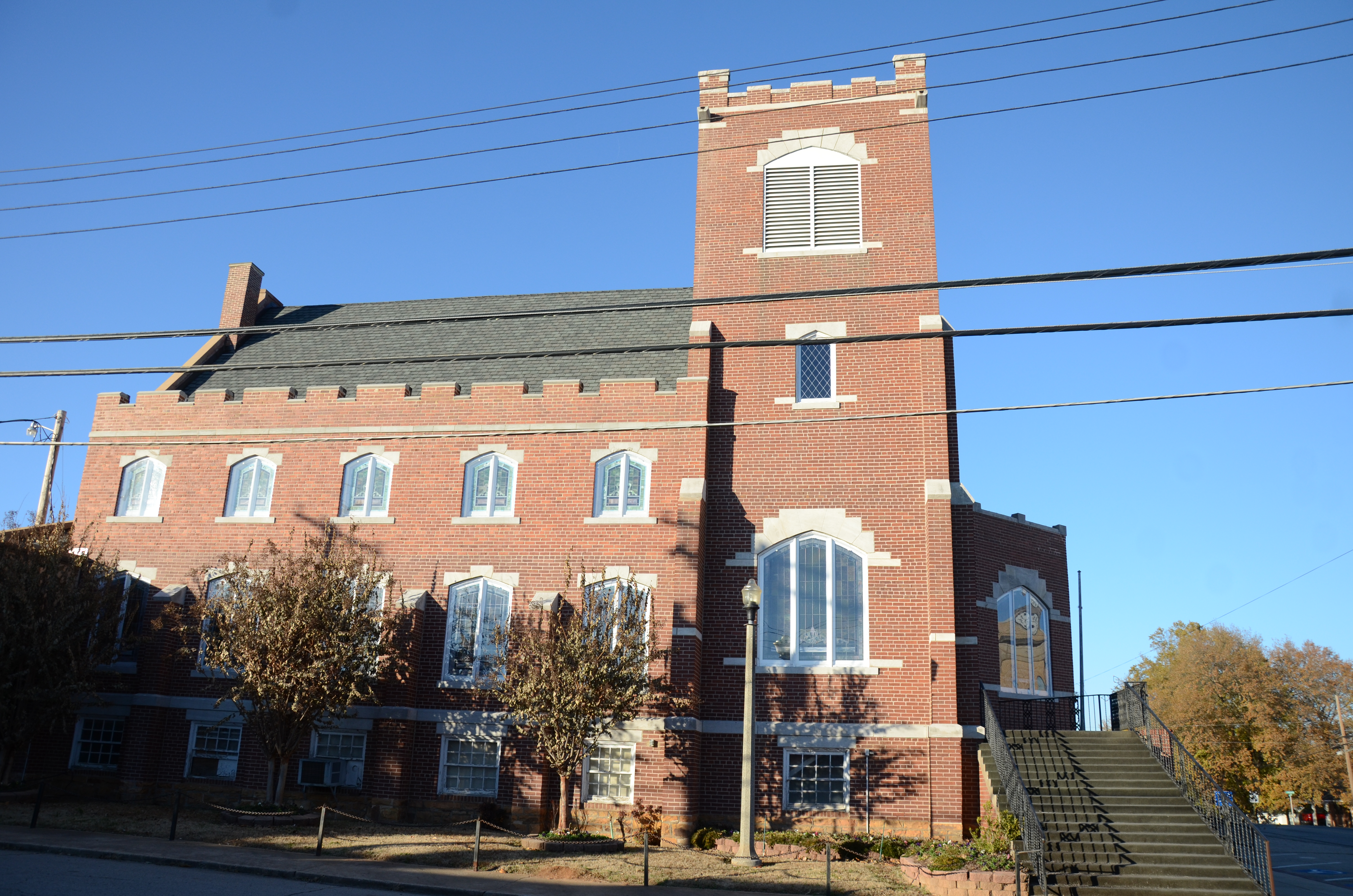

- Location within Arkansas Location within the United States
- Location: 355 N. Broadway, Booneville, Arkansas
- Coordinates: 35°8′38″N 93°55′20″W
- Area: Less than one acre
- Built: 1910
- Architectural style: Late Gothic Revival
- NRHP reference No.: 11000301
- Added to NRHP: May 25, 2011

The First United Methodist Church, originally the Booneville Methodist Episcopal Church South, is a historic church building at 355 North Broadway Avenue in Booneville, Arkansas. It is a two-story brick building with Late Gothic Revival styling, built between 1910 and 1911 for a congregation founded in 1868. It has a gabled roof with a crenellated parapet and a buttressed tower topped by crenellated parapets.

The church was listed on the National Register of Historic Places in 2011.

== See also ==
- National Register of Historic Places listings in Logan County, Arkansas
