= Hillpark =

Hillpark or Hill Park may refer to:

- Hillpark, Glasgow, Scotland
- Hillpark, Auckland, New Zealand
- Hill Park, Karachi, park in Pakistan
- Hill Park, Tatsfield, park in England

== See also ==
- Park Hill (disambiguation)
