= New Liberty School (Liberty, Arkansas) =

- U.S. National Register of Historic Places
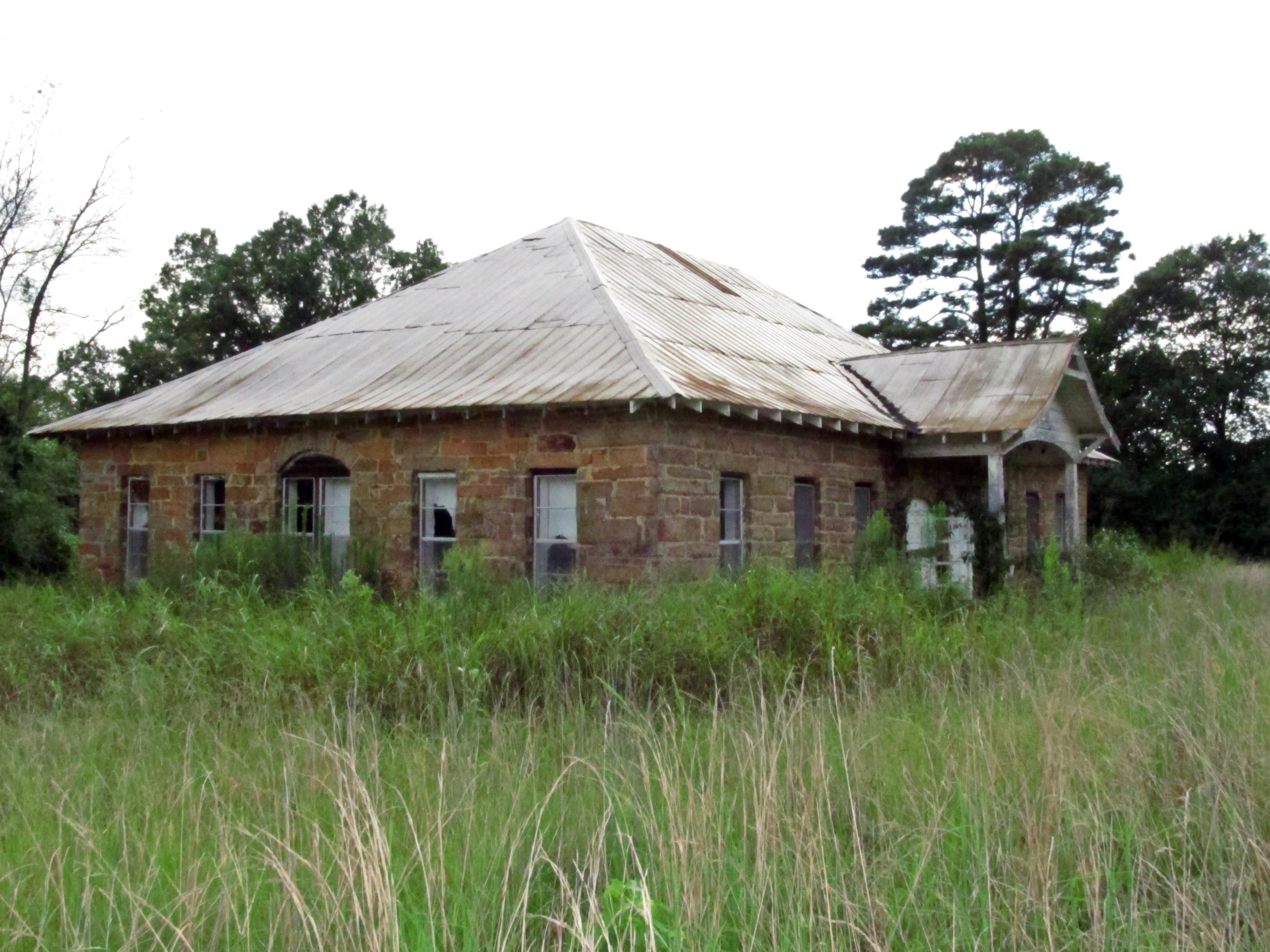

- Location within Arkansas Location within the United States
- Location: S side of AR 22, Liberty, Arkansas
- Coordinates: 35°16′53″N 93°21′43″W
- Area: less than one acre
- Architectural style: Bungalow/craftsman, Plain Traditional
- MPS: Public Schools in the Ozarks MPS
- NRHP reference No.: 92001220
- Added to NRHP: September 10, 1992

The New Liberty School is a historic school building in rural Logan County, Arkansas. It is located east of New Blaine, on the south side of Arkansas Highway 22 east of the New Liberty Church. It is a single-story masonry structure, built of coursed stone and covered by a metal hip roof. Its front entrance is sheltered by a gabled portico supported by simple square posts set on brick piers. It was built in 1922, and is a well-preserved example of an early 20th-century school, built before Arkansas instituted significant reforms in school building standards.

The building was listed on the National Register of Historic Places in 1992. The building now stands vacant.

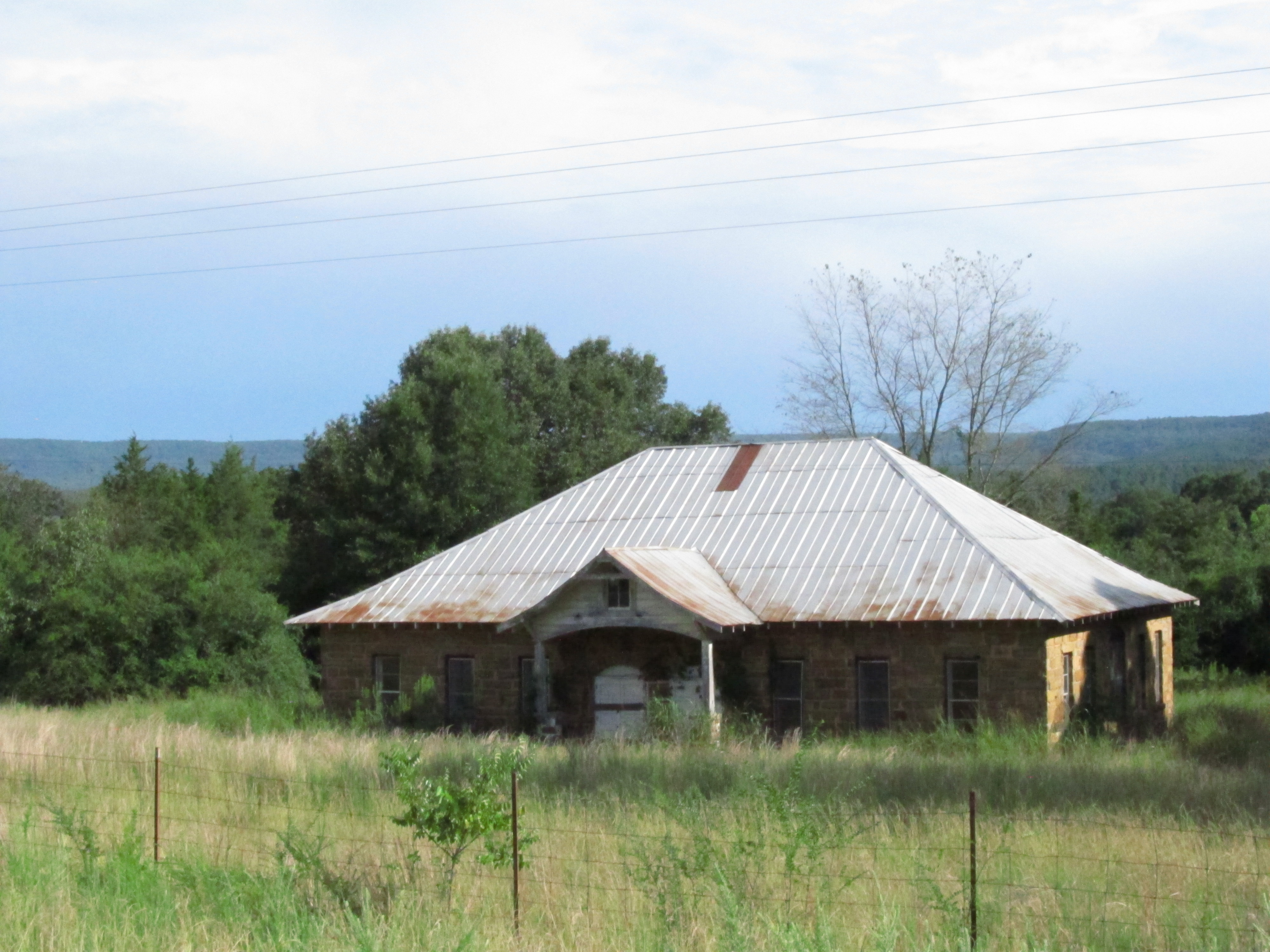

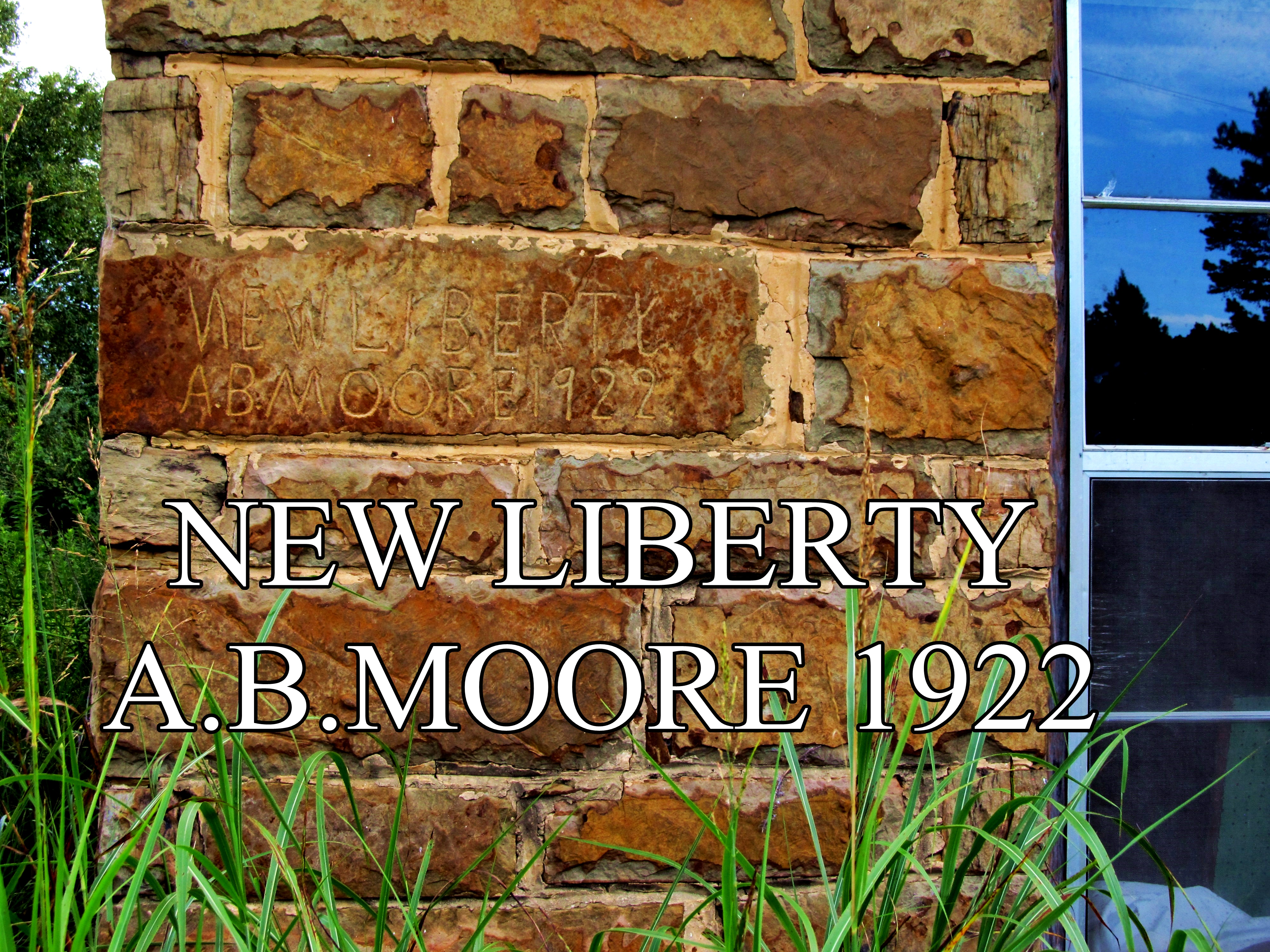

== See also ==
- National Register of Historic Places listings in Logan County, Arkansas
