= Park Hill (Paris, Arkansas) =

Historic house in Arkansas, United States

- U.S. National Register of Historic Places
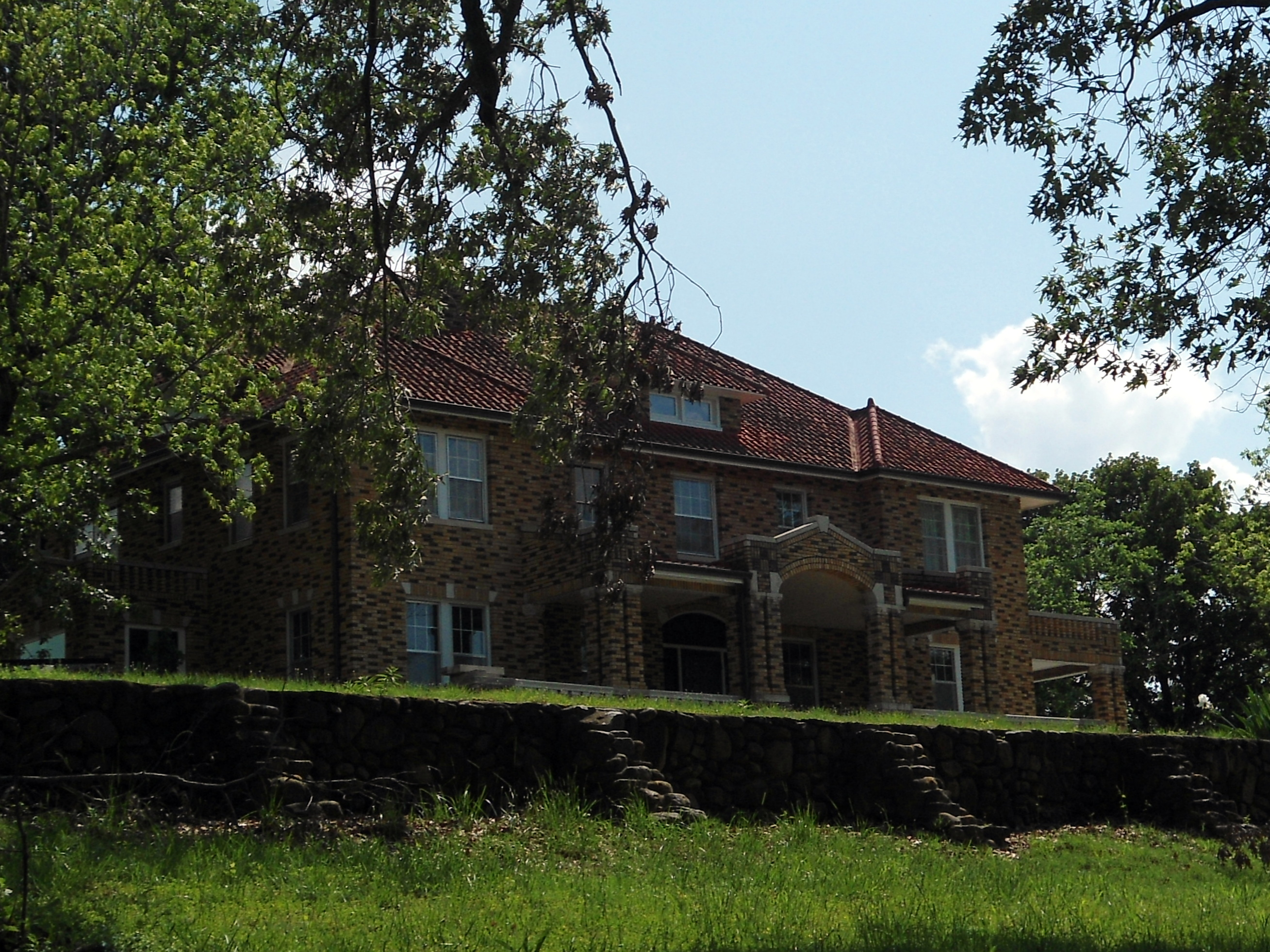

- Location within Arkansas Location within the United States
- Location: 400 E. Wahl St., Paris, Arkansas
- Coordinates: 35°17′5″N 93°43′35″W
- Built: 1930
- Architect: Bassham & Wheeler
- Architectural style: Mission Revival
- NRHP reference No.: 12001233
- Added to NRHP: January 29, 2013

Park Hill is a historic house at 400 East Wahl Street in Paris, Arkansas. It is a large two-story brick building, with Mediterranean style. It has a red tile hip roof, with a three-bay porch projecting from its five-bay facade, and a porte cochere on the west side. The house was built in 1929–30 as a wedding present from Charles Wahl to his wife, and was designed by Bassham & Wheeler of Fort Smith, Arkansas. It is a distinctive local example of the Mediterranean Revival style.

The house was listed on the National Register of Historic Places in 2013.

== See also ==
- National Register of Historic Places listings in Logan County, Arkansas
