= Liberty Schoolhouse =

Historic school building in Arkansas, United States

- U.S. National Register of Historic Places
- Location within Arkansas Location within the United States
- Nearest city: Corley, Arkansas
- Coordinates: 35°12′1″N 93°30′34″W
- Area: less than one acre
- Built: 1897
- Architectural style: Plain Traditional
- NRHP reference No.: 09001252
- Added to NRHP: January 21, 2010

The Liberty Schoolhouse, also known as the Mt. Grove School, is a historic schoolhouse in a remote part of Ozark-St. Francis National Forest in Logan County, Arkansas. It is east of Corley, Arkansas, near the junction of Valentine Spring and Copper Spring Roads. It is a single-story vernacular wood-frame structure, with a gabled roof, weatherboard siding, and a foundation of concrete block piers. It was built in 1897, and was used by the community as both a school and church. It served as a school until 1944, and also hosted civic meetings and social events.

The building was listed on the National Register of Historic Places in 2010.

It is a one-room schoolhouse.

== See also ==
- National Register of Historic Places listings in Logan County, Arkansas
