= Jack Creek Bathhouse =

- U.S. National Register of Historic Places
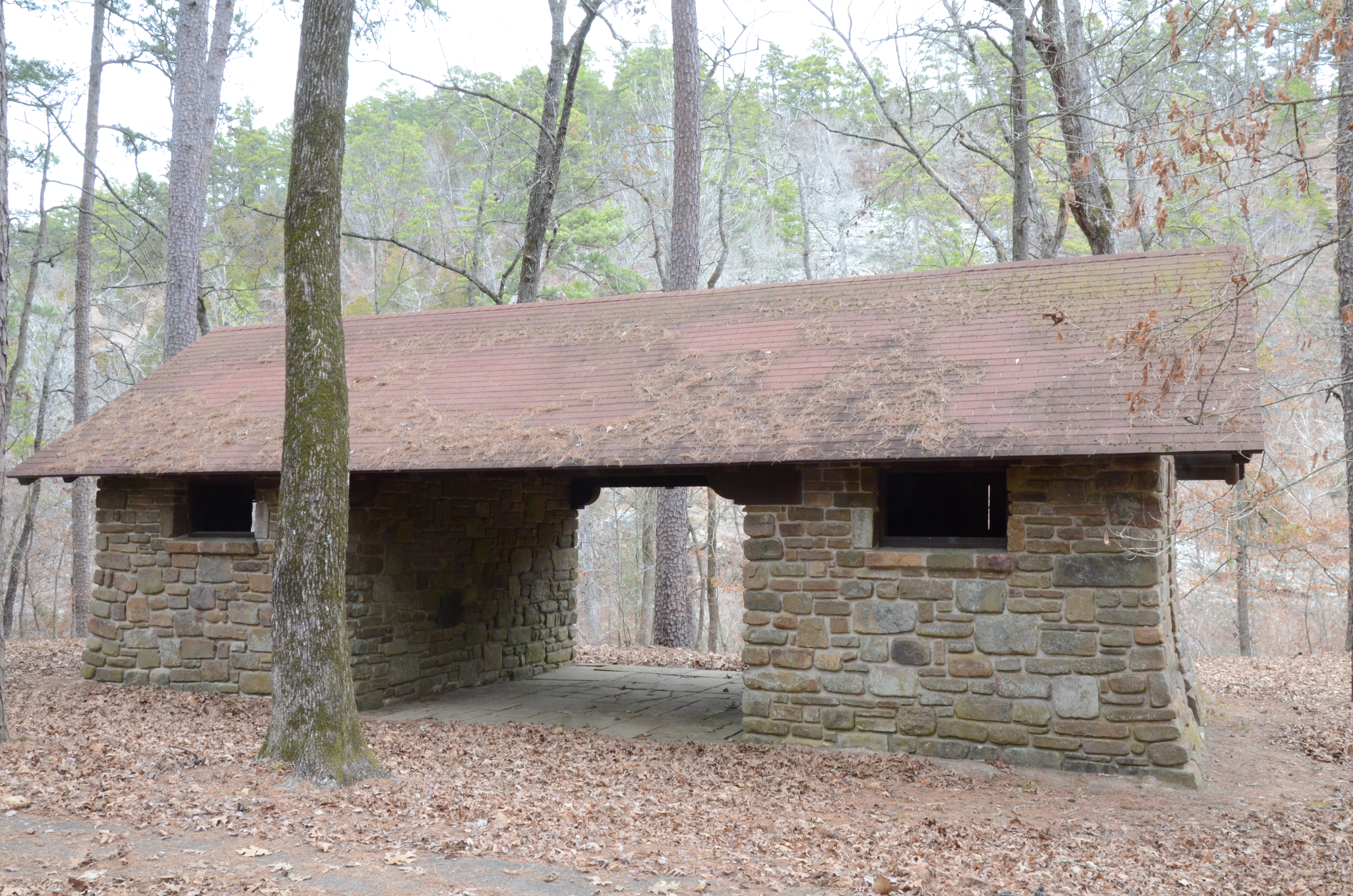

- Location within Arkansas Location within the United States
- Location: Jack Creek Recreation Area, Ouachita National Forest, near Sugar Grove, Arkansas
- Coordinates: 35°2′4″N 93°50′44″W
- Area: 1.5 acres (0.61 ha)
- Built: 1936
- Built by: Civilian Conservation Corps
- Architectural style: Rustic
- MPS: Facilities Constructed by the CCC in Arkansas MPS
- NRHP reference No.: 93001093
- Added to NRHP: October 21, 1993

The Jack Creek Bathhouse is a historic recreational facility in Ouachita National Forest, Logan County, Arkansas. It is located south of Booneville, at the Jack Creek Recreation Area in the northern part of the national forest. It is a single-story masonry structure, built out of rustic stone, with a gabled roof supported by logs. It has two dressing rooms, separated by an open breezeway. It was built in 1936 by a crew of the Civilian Conservation Corps, and is a well-preserved example of the Rustic architecture the CCC is well known for producing.

The building was listed on the National Register of Historic Places in 1993.

== See also ==
- National Register of Historic Places listings in Logan County, Arkansas
