= Magazine City Hall-Jail =

- U.S. National Register of Historic Places
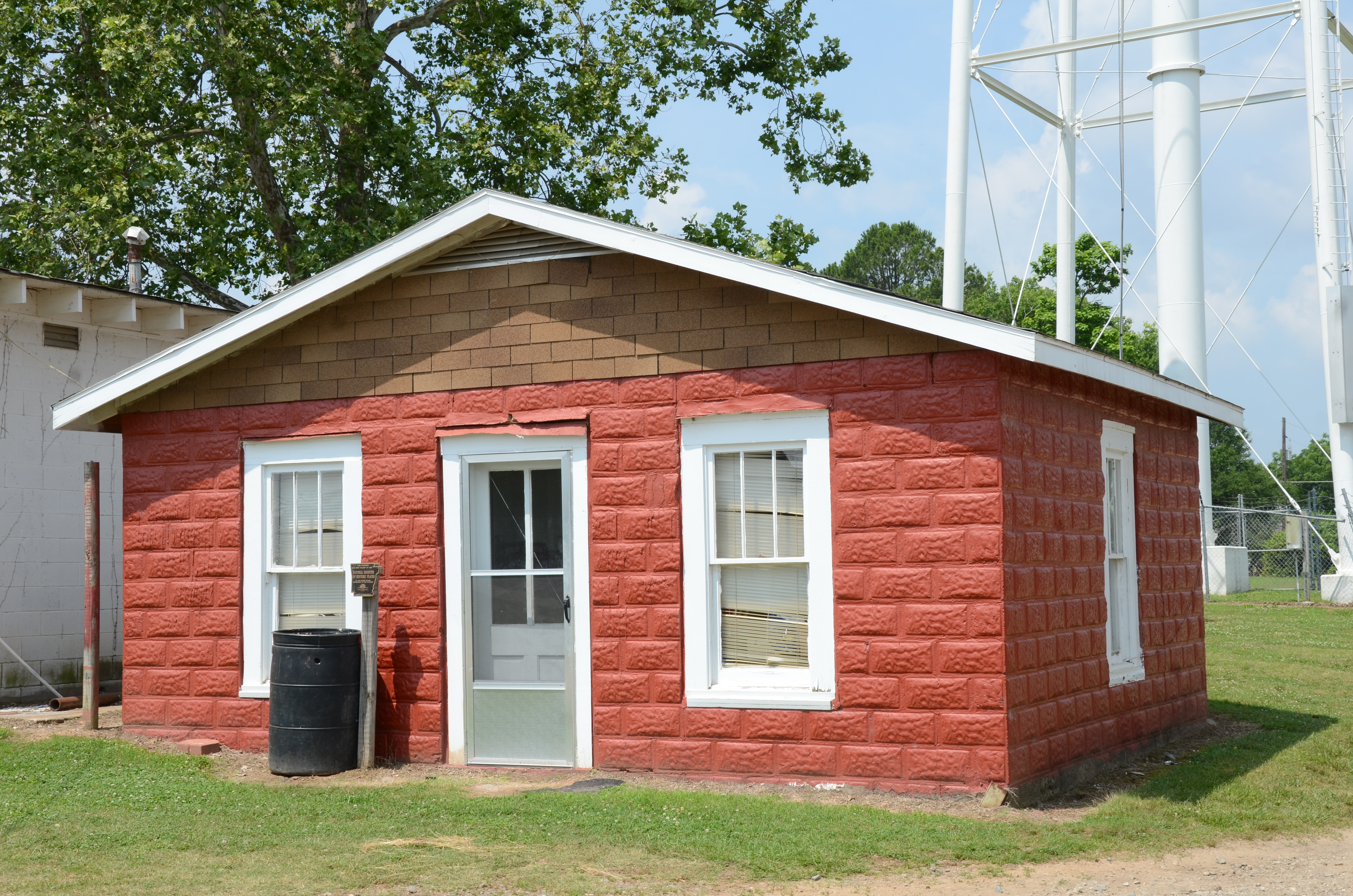

- Location within Arkansas Location within the United States
- Location: NW of jct. of Garland and Priddy Sts., Magazine, Arkansas
- Coordinates: 35°9′1″N 93°48′32″W
- Area: less than one acre
- Built: 1934
- Built by: J. Arless Jenkins
- Architectural style: Vernacular, Plain Traditiona
- NRHP reference No.: 93000483
- Added to NRHP: June 8, 1993

The Magazine City Hall-Jail is a historic government building at the northwest corner of Garland and Priddy Streets in Magazine, Arkansas. It is a single-story masonry structure, built out of rusticated concrete blocks and covered by a gable roof. The gable ends are framed in wood. The rear portion of the building, housing the jail cells, has a flat roof. It was built in 1934, with the concrete blocks formed by a local mason to resemble ashlar stone. It is the only local municipal building built out these materials, and was used for its original purposes into the 1980s.

The building was listed on the National Register of Historic Places in 1993.

== See also ==
- National Register of Historic Places listings in Logan County, Arkansas
