= Logan County Courthouse, Eastern District =

- U.S. National Register of Historic Places
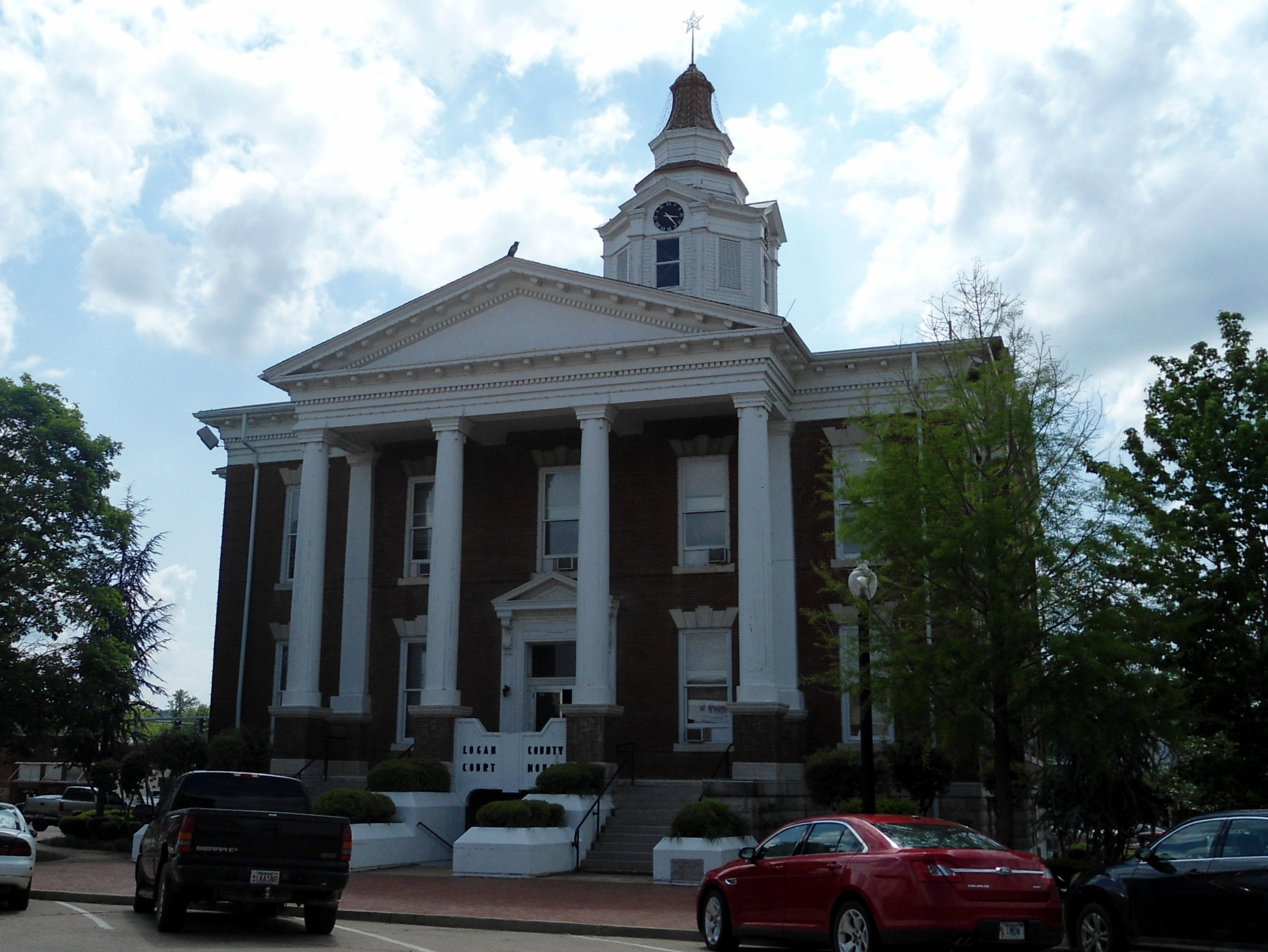

- Location within Arkansas Location within the United States
- Location: Courthouse Sq., Paris, Arkansas
- Coordinates: 35°17′32″N 93°43′48″W
- Area: less than one acre
- Built: 1908
- Architect: Alonzo Klingensmith
- NRHP reference No.: 76000429
- Added to NRHP: July 30, 1976

The Logan County Courthouse, Eastern District is located at Courthouse Square in the center of Paris, one of two county seats for Logan County, Arkansas. It is a handsome two story Classical Revival building, built out of brick and set on a foundation of cut stone. It has classical temple porticos on three sides, and is topped by an octagonal tower with clock and belfry. It was built in 1908, and is one of the city's most architecturally imposing buildings.

The building was listed on the National Register of Historic Places in 1976.

== See also ==
- National Register of Historic Places listings in Logan County, Arkansas
