= Schriver House =

Historic house in Arkansas, United States

- U.S. National Register of Historic Places
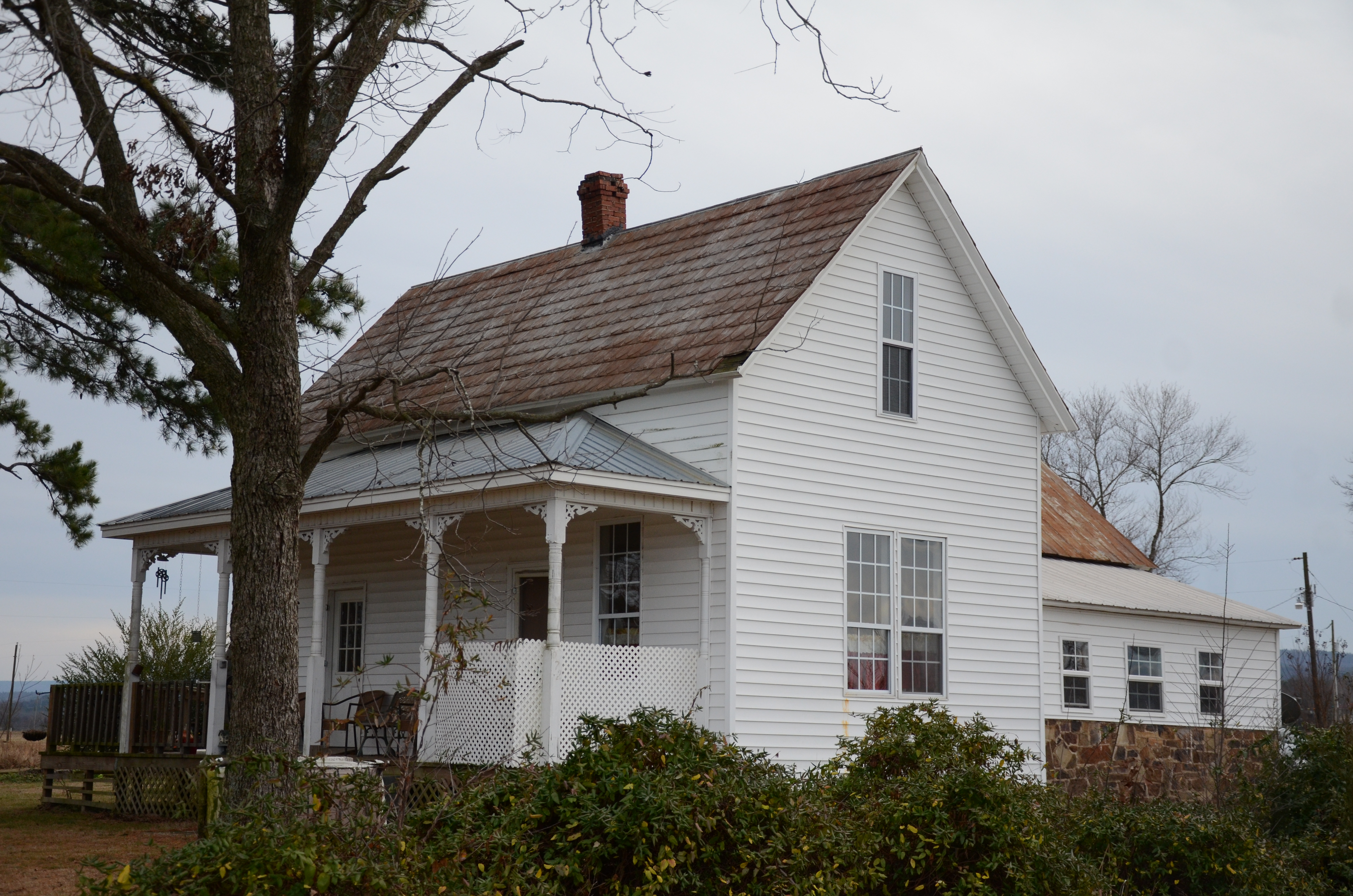

- Location within Arkansas Location within the United States
- Location: Carter Ln., Subiaco, Arkansas
- Coordinates: 35°18′8″N 93°39′1″W
- Area: 2 acres (0.81 ha)
- Built: 1885
- Architect: Martin Schriver
- Architectural style: Queen Anne
- NRHP reference No.: 95001125
- Added to NRHP: September 22, 1995

The Schriver House is a historic house on the east side of Carter Lane in Subiaco, Arkansas. It is a 1 1/2-story wood-frame structure, with a side gable roof and weatherboard siding. It is a vernacular version of a double pen, whose front porch has been ornamented with Queen Anne-style gingerbread brackets and turned posts. Built about 1885, it is one of the small community's finer examples of Queen Anne architecture, and one of the last surviving elements of the defunct community of Spielerville, which was located to the north.

The house was listed on the National Register of Historic Places in 1995.

== See also ==
- National Register of Historic Places listings in Logan County, Arkansas
