= Bank of Booneville Building =

- U.S. National Register of Historic Places
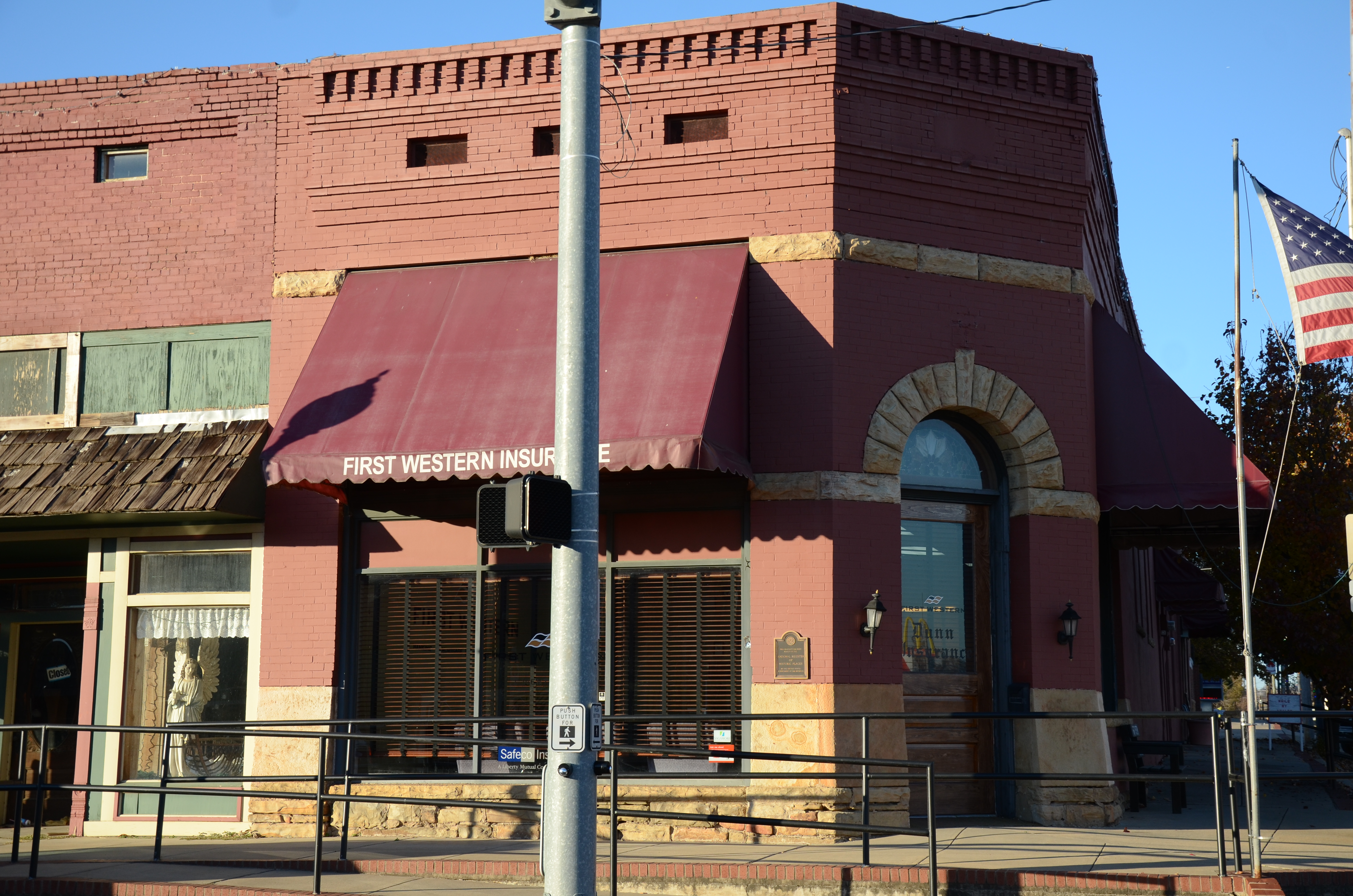

- Location within Arkansas Location within the United States
- Location: 1 W. Main St., Booneville, Arkansas
- Coordinates: 35°8′26″N 93°55′17″W
- Area: less than one acre
- Built: 1902
- NRHP reference No.: 78000608
- Added to NRHP: April 26, 1978

The Bank of Booneville Building is a historic commercial building at 1 West Main Street in downtown Booneville, Arkansas. Built in 1902, this brick two-story building was one of the first buildings to be built in what is now the commercial heart of the city. The Bank of Booneville was chartered in 1899, and this was its home until its closure in 1934. The building's modest Renaissance features include a rusticated stone arch entrance on the corner, and brick corbelling and dentil work on the cornice.

The building was listed on the National Register of Historic Places in 1978.

== See also ==
- National Register of Historic Places listings in Logan County, Arkansas
