= National Register of Historic Places listings in Logan County, Arkansas =

Location of Logan County in Arkansas

This is a list of the National Register of Historic Places listings in Logan County, Arkansas.

This is intended to be a complete list of the properties and districts on the National Register of Historic Places in Logan County, Arkansas, United States. The locations of National Register properties and districts for which the latitude and longitude coordinates are included below, may be seen in a map.

There are 44 properties and districts listed on the National Register in the county. One additional listing has been removed from the Register.

Contents: Counties in Arkansas
- Arkansas
- Ashley
- Baxter
- Benton
- Boone
- Bradley
- Calhoun
- Carroll
- Chicot
- Clark
- Clay
- Cleburne
- Cleveland
- Columbia
- Conway
- Craighead
- Crawford
- Crittenden
- Cross
- Dallas
- Desha
- Drew
- Faulkner
- Franklin
- Fulton
- Garland
- Grant
- Greene
- Hempstead
- Hot Spring
- Howard
- Independence
- Izard
- Jackson
- Jefferson
- Johnson
- Lafayette
- Lawrence
- Lee
- Lincoln
- Little River
- Logan
- Lonoke
- Madison
- Marion
- Miller
- Mississippi
- Monroe
- Montgomery
- Nevada
- Newton
- Ouachita
- Perry
- Phillips
- Pike
- Poinsett
- Polk
- Pope
- Prairie
- Pulaski (Little Rock)
- Randolph
- St. Francis
- Saline
- Scott
- Searcy
- Sebastian
- Sevier
- Sharp
- Stone
- Union
- Van Buren
- Washington
- White
- Woodruff
- Yell

This National Park Service list is complete through NPS recent listings posted June 6, 2026.

== Current listings ==
	Name on the Register	Image	Date listed	Location	City or town	Description
1	American Legion Post No. 121	American Legion Post No. 121	June 20, 1995 (#95000758)	Legion Hut Rd., off Highway 107; 35°16′33″N 93°44′03″W	Paris	
2	Anhalt Barn	Anhalt Barn	February 25, 1993 (#93000087)	County Road 68; 35°17′56″N 93°28′46″W	New Blaine	
3	Arkansas Tuberculosis Sanatorium Historic District	Arkansas Tuberculosis Sanatorium Historic District	October 5, 2006 (#06000414)	Eastern end of Highway 116; 35°05′48″N 93°54′54″W	Booneville	
4	Bank of Booneville Building	Bank of Booneville Building	April 26, 1978 (#78000608)	1 W. Main St. 35°08′26″N 93°55′17″W	Booneville	
5	Booneville Commercial Historic District	Booneville Commercial Historic District	June 4, 2013 (#13000351)	East side of 100 and 200 blocks of North Broadway Avenue; 35°08′22″N 93°55′18″W	Booneville	
6	Booneville Methodist Episcopal Church South	Booneville Methodist Episcopal Church South	May 25, 2011 (#11000301)	355 N. Broadway; 35°08′28″N 93°55′20″W	Booneville	
7	Burnett Springs	Burnett Springs	September 22, 1995 (#95001126)	End of County Road 704, approximately 1 mile (1.6 km) east of Corley; 35°12′58″N 93°38′34″W	Corley	
8	Chicago, Rock Island, and Pacific Railroad Depot		February 14, 1978 (#78000607)	Off Highway 10; 35°07′47″N 93°42′34″W	Blue Mountain	
9	Dr. Stephen N. Chism House	Dr. Stephen N. Chism House	August 16, 1994 (#94000853)	Eastern side of Highway 23, south of its junction with Highway 217; 35°13′03″N 93°56′23″W	Booneville	
10	Cove Creek Bridge	Cove Creek Bridge	May 26, 1995 (#95000645)	Highway 309 over Cove Creek; 35°11′35″N 93°37′24″W	Corley	
11	Cove Creek Tributary Bridge	Cove Creek Tributary Bridge	May 26, 1995 (#95000644)	Highway 309 over a tributary of Cove Creek; 35°14′31″N 93°38′22″W	Corley	
12	Cove Lake Bathhouse	Cove Lake Bathhouse	September 11, 1995 (#94001617)	Forest Service Rd. 1608A in the Ozark-St. Francis National Forest; 35°13′44″N 93°37′45″W	Corley	
13	Cove Lake Spillway Dam-Bridge	Cove Lake Spillway Dam-Bridge	September 11, 1995 (#94001618)	Highway 309, 9 miles (14 km) south of Paris in the Ozark-St. Francis National Forest; 35°13′58″N 93°37′45″W	Corley	
14	Elizabeth Hall	Elizabeth Hall	May 4, 1976 (#76000428)	Off Highway 22; 35°17′03″N 93°24′32″W	New Blaine	
15	Farmer's State Bank	Farmer's State Bank	July 11, 2002 (#02000757)	100 Seallars St. 35°17′24″N 93°25′16″W	New Blaine	
16	Farmers and Merchants Bank-Masonic Lodge	Farmers and Merchants Bank-Masonic Lodge	November 19, 1993 (#93001257)	288 N. Broadway; 35°08′24″N 93°55′17″W	Booneville	
17	First Christian Church	First Christian Church	June 30, 1995 (#95000791)	120 E. Walnut St. 35°17′29″N 93°43′41″W	Paris	
18	John Gabriel Fort House	John Gabriel Fort House	March 28, 1996 (#96000331)	Reveille Valley Rd., southeast of Driggs; 35°12′26″N 93°44′05″W	Driggs	
19	Tolbert E. Gill House	Tolbert E. Gill House	September 30, 1993 (#93001024)	Highway 22 west of its junction with Highway 109; 35°17′31″N 93°44′00″W	Paris	
20	Jack Creek Bathhouse	Jack Creek Bathhouse	October 21, 1993 (#93001093)	Forest Service Road 141, southwest of Sugar Grove, in the Ouachita National Forest; 35°02′04″N 93°50′44″W	Sugar Grove	
21	Freeborn T. Lasater House	Freeborn T. Lasater House	July 11, 2002 (#02000756)	494 Highway 197; 35°17′22″N 93°25′06″W	New Blaine	
22	Liberty Schoolhouse		January 21, 2010 (#09001252)	12682 Spring Lake Rd. 35°11′55″N 93°30′35″W	Corley	
23	Little Rock to Cantonment Gibson Road-Short Mountain Segment	Little Rock to Cantonment Gibson Road-Short Mountain Segment	January 24, 2008 (#07001429)	Short Mountain Rd. between Horseshoe Mountain and Short Mountain Creek; 35°18′41″N 93°44′39″W	Paris	
24	Logan County Courthouse, Eastern District	Logan County Courthouse, Eastern District	July 30, 1976 (#76000429)	Courthouse Sq. 35°17′32″N 93°43′48″W	Paris	
25	Logan County Courthouse, Southern Judicial District	Logan County Courthouse, Southern Judicial District	March 8, 1997 (#97000207)	Southeastern corner of the junction of 4th and N. Broadway Sts. 35°08′28″N 93°55′17″W	Booneville	
26	Magazine City Hall-Jail	Magazine City Hall-Jail	June 8, 1993 (#93000483)	Northwest of the junction of Garland and Priddy Sts. 35°09′01″N 93°48′32″W	Magazine	
27	Main Street Bridge	Main Street Bridge	July 11, 2002 (#02000755)	Sellers St. at Silver Smith Branch; 35°17′19″N 93°25′13″W	New Blaine	
28	Methodist Episcopal Church, South	Methodist Episcopal Church, South	June 20, 1995 (#95000757)	205 N. Elm St. 35°17′38″N 93°43′46″W	Paris	
29	Mount Salem Church and School		May 22, 2018 (#100002452)	553 Mt. Salem Rd. #101; 35°12′52″N 93°34′57″W	Paris vicinity	
30	New Blaine School	New Blaine School	August 18, 1992 (#92001007)	Junction of Highway 22 and Spring Rd. 35°17′06″N 93°25′17″W	New Blaine	
31	New Liberty School	New Liberty School	September 10, 1992 (#92001220)	South of Highway 22; 35°16′53″N 93°21′43″W	Liberty	
32	Old Arkansas Highway 22	Old Arkansas Highway 22	September 27, 2003 (#03000950)	Part of Highway 197, the Highway 197 Loop, and Rainwater Loop; 35°17′11″N 93°25′23″W	New Blaine	
33	Old Logan County Jail	Old Logan County Jail	November 19, 1993 (#93001254)	204 N. Vine St. 35°17′37″N 93°43′54″W	Paris	
34	Paris Commercial Historic District	Paris Commercial Historic District	May 12, 2009 (#09000314)	Roughly bounded by N. Express, Short Mountain, N. 1st, E. Pine, and E. and W. Academy Sts. 35°17′31″N 93°43′48″W	Paris	
35	Paris Post Office	Paris Post Office	August 14, 1998 (#98000923)	206 N. Elm St. 35°17′39″N 93°43′47″W	Paris	
36	Park Hill	Park Hill	January 29, 2013 (#12001233)	400 E. Wahl St. 35°17′05″N 93°43′35″W	Paris	
37	Petit Jean River Bridge		May 26, 1995 (#95000646)	Highway 109 over the Petit Jean River; 35°05′48″N 93°48′03″W	Sugar Grove	
38	Saint Anthony's Catholic Church	Saint Anthony's Catholic Church	August 21, 1986 (#86001885)	North of Highway 22; 35°18′48″N 93°52′55″W	Ratcliff	
39	Schriver House	Schriver House	September 22, 1995 (#95001125)	Leo Ave., north of its junction with Highway 22; 35°18′08″N 93°39′01″W	Subiaco	
40	Short Mountain Creek Bridge	Short Mountain Creek Bridge	September 24, 2004 (#04001039)	County Road 64; 35°18′41″N 93°44′37″W	Paris	
41	Smith Hospital	Smith Hospital	April 11, 1994 (#94000369)	Northern terminus of Express St. 35°17′53″N 93°43′50″W	Paris	
42	Troy Lasater Service Station	Troy Lasater Service Station	October 4, 2002 (#02001075)	Highway 197 Loop; 35°17′20″N 93°25′11″W	New Blaine	
43	Union Church and School	Union Church and School	June 1, 2005 (#05000497)	2158 Union Rd. 35°19′24″N 93°39′52″W	Paris	Now used as the Union School Heritage Center
44	Evelyn Gill Walker House	Evelyn Gill Walker House	September 16, 1993 (#93000985)	18 S. Spruce St. 35°17′30″N 93°44′00″W	Paris	

== Former listings ==
	Name on the Register	Image	Date listed	Date removed	Location	City or town	Description
1	Rock Island Railroad Depot-Booneville		June 11, 1992 (#92000603)	October 18, 2002	S of First St. and W of Broadway, at the N end of Rhyne Ave.	Booneville	Destroyed by fire

== See also ==
- List of National Historic Landmarks in Arkansas
- National Register of Historic Places listings in Arkansas
