= Ratcliff, Arkansas =

- City
- Location in Logan County, Arkansas
- Coordinates: 35°18′24″N 93°53′19″W
- Country: United States
- State: Arkansas
- County: Logan

Area
  - Total: 1.82 sq mi (4.72 km^{2})
  - Land: 1.81 sq mi (4.70 km^{2})
  - Water: 0.0077 sq mi (0.02 km^{2})
- Elevation: 400 ft (120 m)

Population (2020)
  - Total: 167
  - Estimate (2025): 163 ▼
  - Density: 92.0/sq mi (35.54/km^{2})
- Time zone: UTC-6 (Central (CST))
  - Summer (DST): UTC-5 (CDT)
- ZIP code: 72951
- Area code: 479
- FIPS code: 05-58160
- GNIS feature ID: 2404593

Ratcliff is a city in Logan County, Arkansas, United States. As of the 2020 census, Ratcliff had a population of 167.

== Geography ==
Ratcliff is located in northwestern Logan County and is bordered to the east by the town of Caulksville. Arkansas Highway 22 passes through the center of Ratcliff, leading east through Caulksville 9 miles (14 km) to Paris and west 4 miles (6 km) to Branch.

According to the United States Census Bureau, Ratcliff has a total area of 1.8 square miles (4.7 km^{2}), of which 0.01 square miles (0.02 km^{2}), or 0.42%, are water. The town is on the north side of the valley of Little Creek, a tributary of Sixmile Creek which flows northeast to the Arkansas River.

== Demographics ==
Historical population
Census	Pop.	Note	%±
1910	175		—
1920	257		46.9%
1930	231		−10.1%
1940	337		45.9%
1950	213		−36.8%
1960	147		−31.0%
1970	184		25.2%
1980	197		7.1%
1990	180		−8.6%
2000	191		6.1%
2010	202		5.8%
2020	167		−17.3%
2025 (est.)	163	▼	−2.4%
U.S. Decennial Census

As of the census of 2000, there were 191 people, 76 households, and 57 families residing in the city. The population density was 103.2 inhabitants per square mile (39.8/km^{2}). There were 86 housing units at an average density of 46.5 per square mile (18.0/km^{2}). The racial makeup of the city was 98.43% White, 0.52% Native American, and 1.05% from two or more races. 1.57% of the population were Hispanic or Latino of any race.

There were 76 households, out of which 30.3% had children under the age of 18 living with them, 63.2% were married couples living together, 9.2% had a female householder with no husband present, and 23.7% were non-families. 19.7% of all households were made up of individuals, and 9.2% had someone living alone who was 65 years of age or older. The average household size was 2.51 and the average family size was 2.88.

In the city, the population was spread out, with 23.6% under the age of 18, 9.4% from 18 to 24, 27.7% from 25 to 44, 26.7% from 45 to 64, and 12.6% who were 65 years of age or older. The median age was 37 years. For every 100 females, there were 96.9 males. For every 100 females age 18 and over, there were 102.8 males.

The median income for a household in the city was $23,000, and the median income for a family was $27,500. Males had a median income of $27,500 versus $16,875 for females. The per capita income for the city was $13,530. About 15.5% of families and 20.5% of the population were below the poverty line, including 21.4% of those under the age of eighteen and 22.6% of those 65 or over.

== Notable person ==
- Rollie Stiles, former Major League Baseball player
