= Booneville Commercial Historic District =

Historic district in Arkansas, United States

- U.S. National Register of Historic Places
- U.S. Historic district
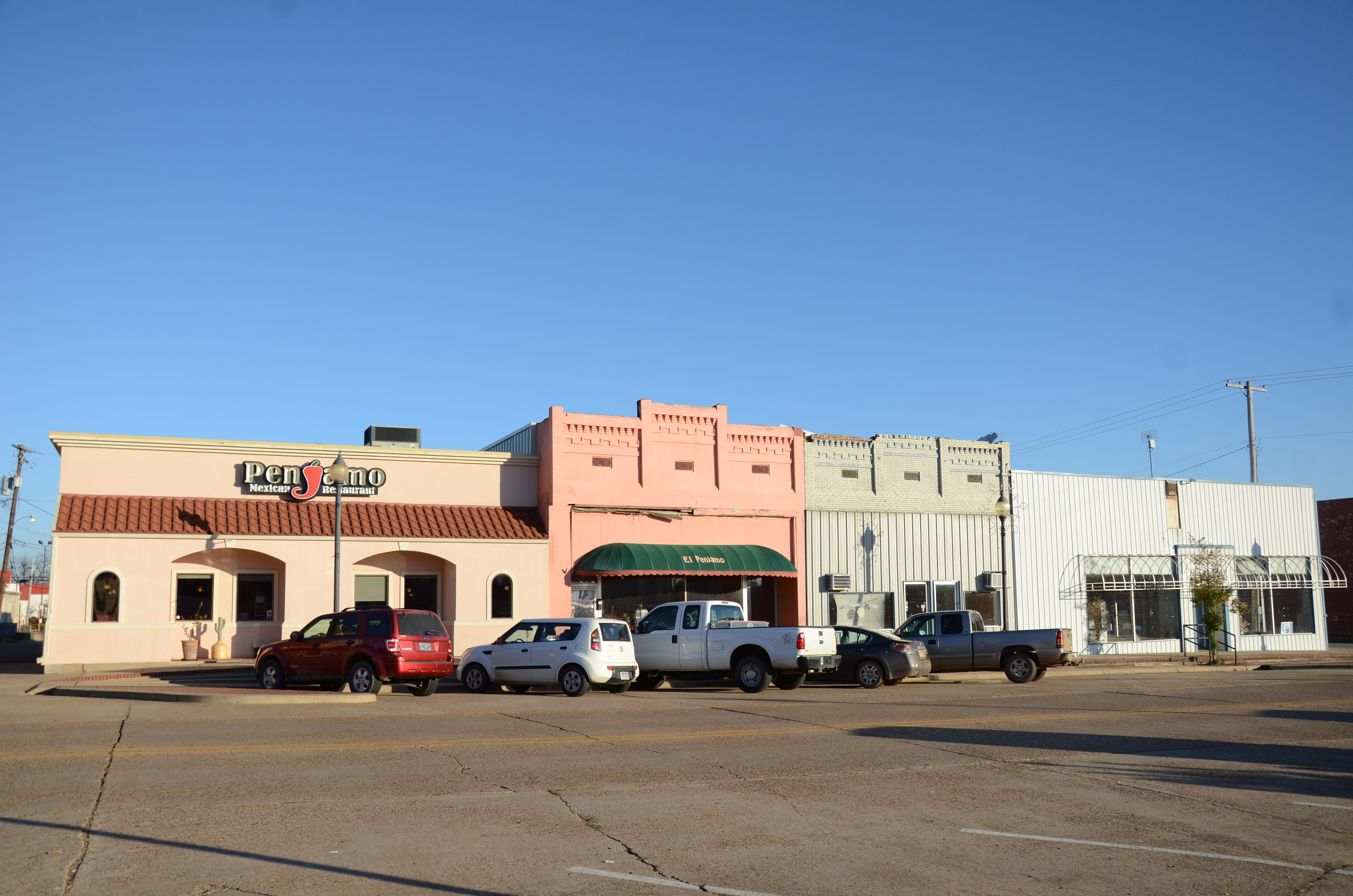

- Location within Arkansas Location within the United States
- Location: East side of 100 and 200 blocks of North Broadway Avenue, Booneville, Arkansas
- Coordinates: 35°8′22″N 93°55′18″W
- Area: 13 acres (5.3 ha)
- Built: 1906
- Architectural style: Moderne, 20th Century Vernacular Commercial
- NRHP reference No.: 13000351
- Added to NRHP: June 4, 2013

The Booneville Commercial Historic District encompasses the early 20th-century commercial heart of Booneville, Arkansas. Located on the east side of the 100 and 200 blocks of North Broadway Avenue are line with commercial buildings, most of which were built between about 1900 and 1920. The city had originally been located south of this location, but was relocated beginning in 1899 due to the arrival of the railroad joining Little Rock, Arkansas and McAlester, Oklahoma. Most of the buildings are in typical early 20th century vernacular commercial styling.

The district was listed on the National Register of Historic Places in 2013.

== See also ==
- National Register of Historic Places listings in Logan County, Arkansas
