= John Parkhill =

John Parkhill may refer to:

- John Parkhill, pseudonym of William R. Cox
- John Parkhill, owner of Parkhill Mill
- John Parkhill, a member of the Leon County Volunteers who was killed by Seminoles and has a monument on the grounds of the Florida State Capitol
