= Paris, Arkansas =

- City
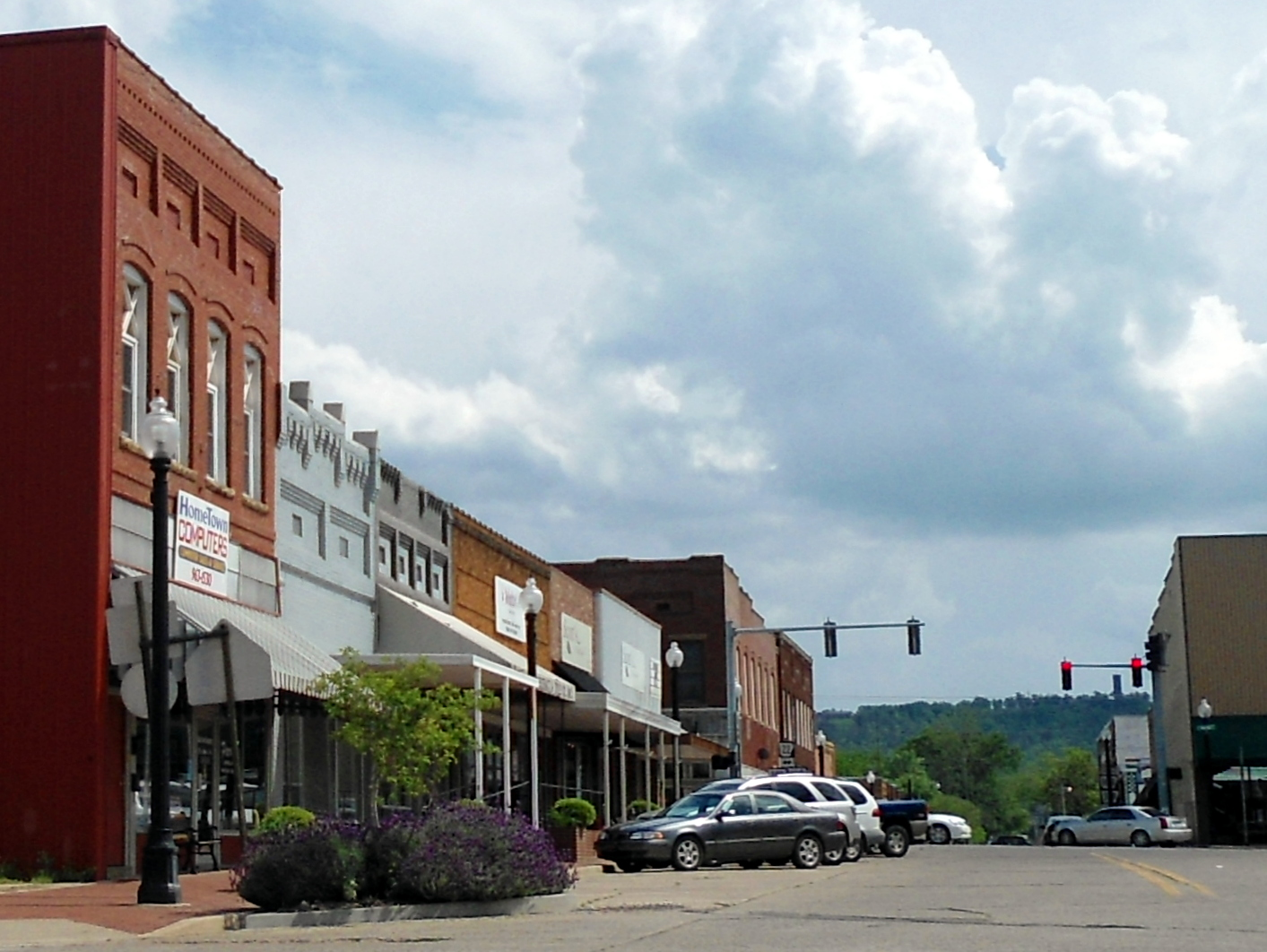

- Location in Logan County, Arkansas
- Coordinates: 35°17′22″N 93°43′30″W
- Country: United States
- State: Arkansas
- County: Logan

Government
  - Mayor: Daniel Rogers

Area
  - Total: 4.85 sq mi (12.56 km^{2})
  - Land: 4.57 sq mi (11.83 km^{2})
  - Water: 0.28 sq mi (0.73 km^{2})
- Elevation: 430 ft (130 m)

Population (2020)
  - Total: 3,176
  - Estimate (2025): 3,357 ▲
  - Density: 695.3/sq mi (268.46/km^{2})
- Time zone: UTC-6 (Central (CST))
  - Summer (DST): UTC-5 (CDT)
- ZIP code: 72855
- Area code: 479
- FIPS code: 05-53480
- GNIS feature ID: 2404472
- Website: www.paris-ar.us

Paris is a city in Logan County, Arkansas, United States, and serves as the county seat for the northern district of Logan County; its southern district counterpart is Booneville. Its population was 3,176 as of the 2020 U.S. Census.

== Geography ==
Paris is located in a valley near the Arkansas River in the Ozark Mountain region of northwest Arkansas. Its ZIP code is 72855.

According to the United States Census Bureau, the city has a total area of 4.8 square miles (12.4 km^{2}), of which 4.5 square miles (11.7 km^{2}) are land and 0.3 sq mi (0.8 km^{2}) (5.43%) is covered by water.

== Demographics ==
Historical population
Census	Pop.	Note	%±
1890	547		—
1900	836		52.8%
1910	1,497		79.1%
1920	1,740		16.2%
1930	3,234		85.9%
1940	3,430		6.1%
1950	3,731		8.8%
1960	3,007		−19.4%
1970	3,646		21.3%
1980	3,991		9.5%
1990	3,674		−7.9%
2000	3,707		0.9%
2010	3,532		−4.7%
2020	3,176		−10.1%
2025 (est.)	3,357	▲	5.7%
U.S. Decennial Census

=== 2020 census ===
As of the 2020 census, Paris had a population of 3,176. The median age was 43.9 years. 21.5% of residents were under the age of 18 and 23.6% of residents were 65 years of age or older. For every 100 females there were 85.8 males, and for every 100 females age 18 and over there were 81.6 males age 18 and over.

0.0% of residents lived in urban areas, while 100.0% lived in rural areas.

There were 1,380 households in Paris, of which 27.2% had children under the age of 18 living in them. Of all households, 35.6% were married-couple households, 20.1% were households with a male householder and no spouse or partner present, and 37.1% were households with a female householder and no spouse or partner present. About 38.0% of all households were made up of individuals and 19.7% had someone living alone who was 65 years of age or older.

There were 1,600 housing units, of which 13.8% were vacant. The homeowner vacancy rate was 2.1% and the rental vacancy rate was 10.1%.

There were 923 families residing in the city.

Paris racial composition
Race	Number	Percentage
White (non-Hispanic)	2,709	85.3%
Black or African American (non-Hispanic)	73	2.3%
Native American	32	1.01%
Asian	30	0.94%
Other/Mixed	192	6.05%
Hispanic or Latino	140	4.41%

Ancestry in Paris, AR
Ancestry	%
English	6.3
French (Excluding Basque)	1.4
German	10.8
Irish	8.2
Scottish	.7

=== 2010 census ===
As of the census of 2010, 3,532 people, 1,553 households, and 984 families were residing in the city. The population density was 818.1 inhabitants per square mile (315.9/km^{2}). The 1,713 housing units averaged 780 per square mile (146.0/km^{2}). The racial makeup of the city was 92.5% White, 2.4% African American, 0.40% Native American, 0.7% Asian, 1.11% from other races, and 1.29% from two or more races. About 2.16% of the population was Hispanic or Latino of any race.

Of the 1,553 households, 28.6% had children under the age of 18 living with them, 46.0% were married couples living together, 13.7% had a female householder with no husband present, and 36.6% were not families. About 33.4% of all households were made up of individuals, and 18.9% had someone living alone who was 65 years of age or older. The average household size was 2.29 and the average family size was 2.91.

In the city, the population was distributed as 23.8% under the age of 18, 7.6% from 18 to 24, 24.7% from 25 to 44, 22.1% from 45 to 64, and 21.7% who were 65 years of age or older. The median age was 40 years. For every 100 females, there were 86.5 males. For every 100 females age 18 and over, there were 79.5 males.

The median income for a household in the city was $25,424, and for a family was $32,409. Males had a median income of $21,955 versus $17,015 for females. The per capita income for the city was $14,738. About 15.0% of families and 18.5% of the population were below the poverty line, including 27.7% of those under age 18 and 18.7% of those age 65 or over.

== History ==
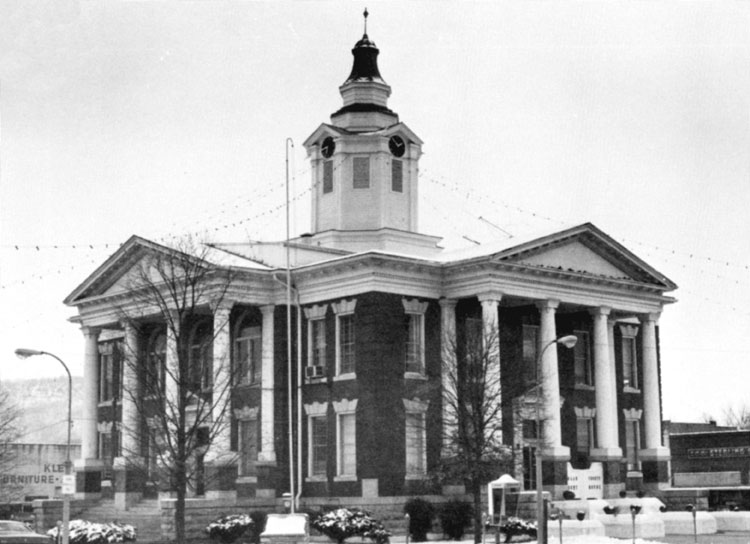
Logan County Courthouse

Pioneers settled the area about 1820. The village of Paris was formed on the Old Military Road between Little Rock and Fort Smith, and 5 miles (8 km) south of the Arkansas River. The Logan County seat, Paris, was named after the French capital in 1874. Paris was incorporated on February 18, 1879.

The villagers constructed a one-story frame courthouse. The town prison was constructed nearly three blocks from the courthouse, and remained the town's prison for many years. The prison now serves as the Logan County Museum.

Coal mining flourished. In the 1890s, Paris was a bustling city of 800 people. Citizens boasted of two newspapers, a bottling-works company, nine general stores, and the Paris Academy. Coal mining was the community's main industry by 1917, but had declined by the '60s. As a result, community leaders sought to diversify the town's economic base. Today, the economy of Paris is benefitting from the presence of manufacturing facilities producing parts for the automotive and aerospace industries. Farming and ranching remain among the largest industries in the county, and tourism got a boost with the construction and opening of a 60-room lodge and guest cabins on the top of Mount Magazine, which is 18 miles (29 km) south of Paris. An estimated 400,000 people a year travelled to Mount Magazine State Park in 2008.

Paris' schools have seen a steady increase in enrollment. The high school and middle school switched campuses to complete a promise to the patrons that was made in 1988.

Several interests have been made in the area by bauxite mining companies looking to reduce the costs of aluminum foil production.

=== Last hanging in Arkansas ===
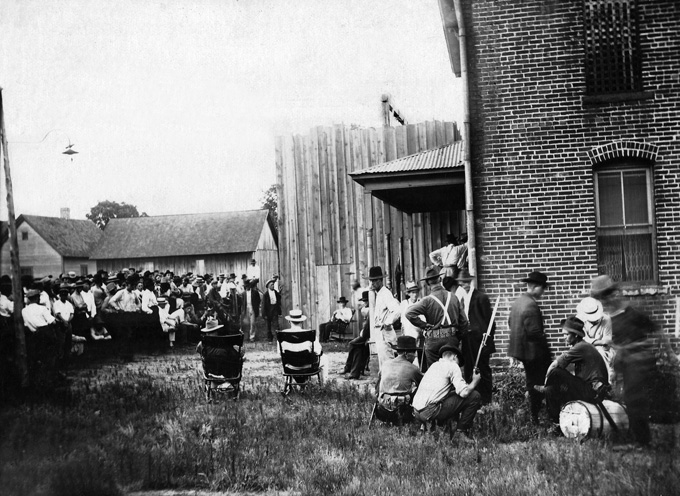
Arthur Tillman at the gallows

Paris was the site of the last public hanging in Arkansas before the first electric chair came into use, in Little Rock.

In 1914, Paris was thrown into turmoil from the murder of a young girl from Delaware, Arkansas. A young man named Arthur Tillman was courting a girl named Amanda Stevens. She disappeared one evening from her home and was found about eight days later, partly submerged in water in a well on the farm of Ambrose Johnson. She was found with a large stone tied around her neck with telephone wire, a bullet through her head, and about a wagon load of rocks covering her body. The girl was believed to be alive when she was put into the well because her hands were filled with dirt that could only result from a struggle or attempting to free herself. On July 15, 1914, Arthur Tillman was hanged for the murder of his girlfriend, Amanda.

Today, the jail is a museum dedicated to Logan County history. Where spectators were located is now a road, joining to the main road, Highway 22. Visitors can tour through the entire building, jail keeper's living quarters side and the jail side. It has many relics of Paris' past, such as farming equipment, clothing, and everyday objects from the settlers' lives, and exhibits of Native American, Civil War, and coal-mining artifacts.

=== Paris Express ===
The Paris Express was founded in 1880, one year after the community of Paris was established, and it is the oldest, continually operating business in the city. J.T. Perryman was the first publisher, and W.H.H. Harley was the first editor. During the next five years of its existence, it had several owners.

In 1885, the weekly Express was purchased from Charles Noble by William M. Greenwood, former publisher of the Chismville Star and an associate with the Fort Smith Daily Tribune. Greenwood published the Paris Express for 46 years until his death in 1929.

Hugh and J.C. Park of the Van Buren Press-Argus purchased the Express from the Greenwood estate and then sold it a few months later to Wallace D. Hurley. Hurley published the paper until 1939, when it was purchased by John Guion and Robert Breeden. Guion was editor and publisher of the Express and a sister paper, the Paris Progress, and in 1946 served as president of the Arkansas Press Association. At that time, the Paris company began publishing the Charleston and Greenwood papers.

The Progress was launched in 1910 and started out as a semiweekly. In 1920, it was renamed the Paris Progress and in 1927 became a weekly. The Paris Commercial Press, which was only in business during 1937, became consolidated with the Progress. It was also a weekly.

The papers were purchased in 1976 by Harte-Hanks Communications, Inc., of San Antonio, Texas. The Paris Express and the Paris Progress were combined into a biweekly bearing the name of Paris Express Progress in January 1977. The Paris Express Progress was sold in April 1988 to Westward Communications, a Dallas-based company.

The biweekly Paris Express Progress combined into a "super" weekly issue on May 17, 1989, called the Paris Express. In July 1997, Westward Communications sold to Westward Communications, LLC based out of The Woodlands, Texas.

Stephens Media Group purchased the Paris Express in March 2000. The company is based in Las Vegas, Nevada. During that timeframe The Paris Express had six full-time employees and a circulation of 3,600.

== Area schools ==
=== Paris school district ===
Paris School District, the area school district, has three public schools:

- Paris Elementary
- Paris Middle School
- Paris High School

Private school:

- Saint Joseph Catholic School

=== Subiaco ===
Subiaco preparatory academy:

- Subiaco Abbey Academy

== Points of interest ==
- Mount Magazine State Park has the highest point in the state of Arkansas.
- Logan County Museum is the restored jail and the site of the last state-sanctioned hanging in Arkansas. Prisoners were kept in an iron cage upstairs, while the jailor and his family lived downstairs. Displays on permanent exhibit at the museum include the history of local mining, the development and demise of the county's railroads, the history and impact of the Smith family of doctors, numerous Indian artifacts, and vintage quilts and other needlework. Main-entrance exhibit themes change monthly.
- Cove Lake Recreation Area is near Mount Magazine.

== Local festivals ==
- Frontier Day - held on the first Saturday of October, Frontier Day celebrates the founding members of the city.
- Butterfly Festival - held the next-to-last weekend in June, it honors the multitudes of butterflies (both rare and common) found in the bluff region of Mount Magazine, founded in 1997. The initiative for the festival was spearheaded by June Gilbreath (fundraising and awareness) after the discovery of a rare species of butterfly — the Diana fritillary butterfly that was previously thought to be extinct, but is found in abundance on the mountain summit. The species has since been designated as the official state butterfly of Arkansas. The festival is celebrated at two sites, atop Mount Magazine and in downtown Paris. Attendance has steadily climbed since 2002 with the 2007 event topping 10,000 people.
- Farmers Market - beginning in May, farmers bring fresh produce to the square for sale.

== Notable people ==
- James Bridges, screenwriter and director of numerous films
- Jon Eubanks, Republican member of Arkansas House of Representatives from Paris since 2011
- Paul Gibson, NFL football player and NCAA hurdles champion
- Zilphia Horton, community organizer, educator, and folklorist
- R. H. Sikes, professional golfer, winner of two PGA Tour events
- Bill Walters, lawyer and legislator
- James Lee Witt, director of FEMA under President Bill Clinton
- Bob Wootton, guitarist for Johnny Cash and the Tennessee Three
