= Climate change in Arkansas =

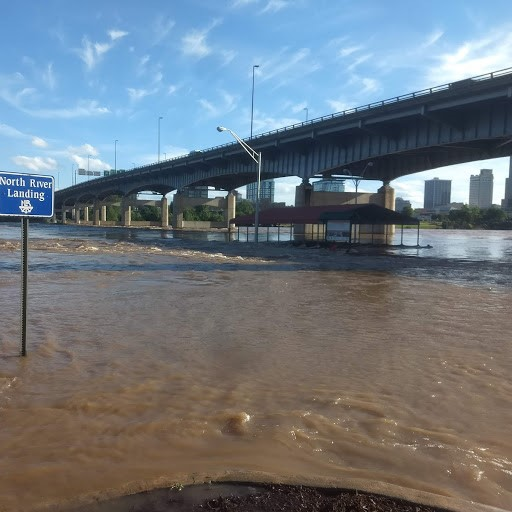
Arkansas River flooding, North Little Rock, May 2019

In contrast to other parts of the United States, Arkansas has not seen a significant increase in temperature over the last 50–100 years. In fact, some parts of the state have cooled. However, the state does receive more annual rainfall and more frequent downpours than other states. Over the next few decades, Arkansas is expected to warm, experiencing an increased severity of flooding and droughts. It is also expected to suffer more storm damage, reduced agricultural yields, and harm to livestock. Arkansas might also have to contend with a heightened risk of heat-related illnesses. In addition, there has been an increase in the number of tornadoes observed in the central United States, including Arkansas.

== Environmental impacts ==
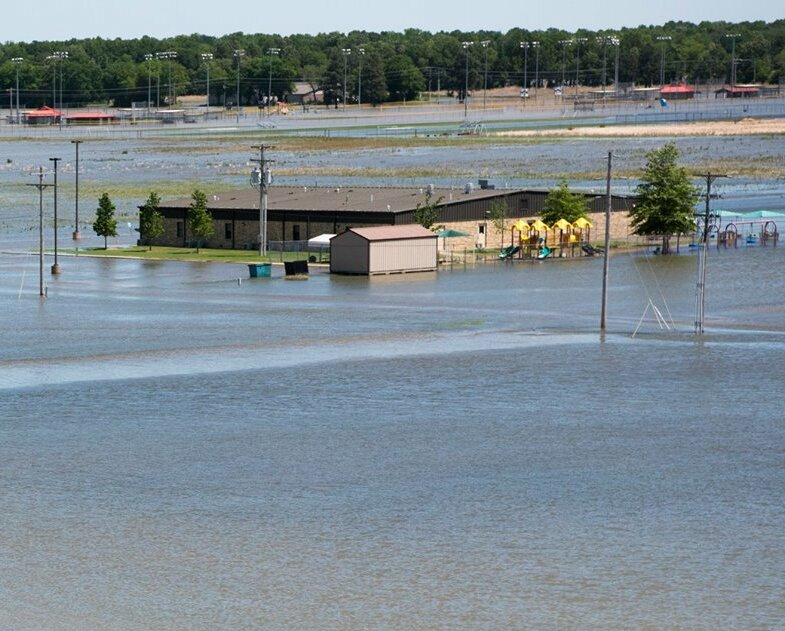
Flood in Pocahontas, 2017

=== Heavy precipitation and flooding ===
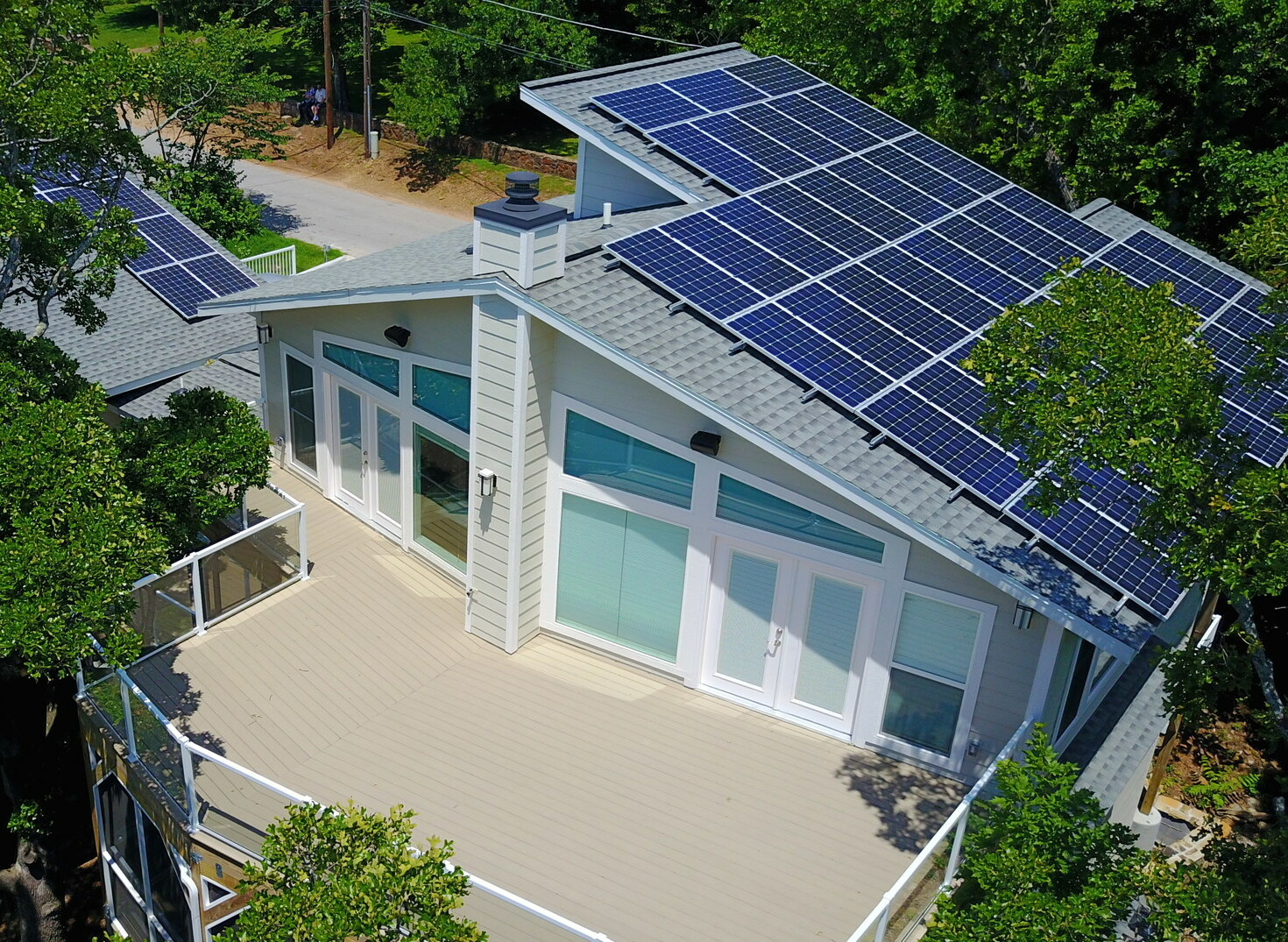
Solar panels on a rooftop in, Fayetteville, Arkansas

Inland flooding, especially near major rivers, is reported to increase due to climate change. The southeast region of the state has experienced a 27% increase in precipitation during heavy rainstorms since 1958, and this trend is expected to continue. The flood risk near the Mississippi River may rise due to increased precipitation and stream flows in the Midwestern watersheds of the Mississippi. Reservoirs and dams managed by the U.S. Army Corps of Engineers are used to mitigate flooding, but have been unable to prevent all flooding.

=== Impact of climate change on water levels ===
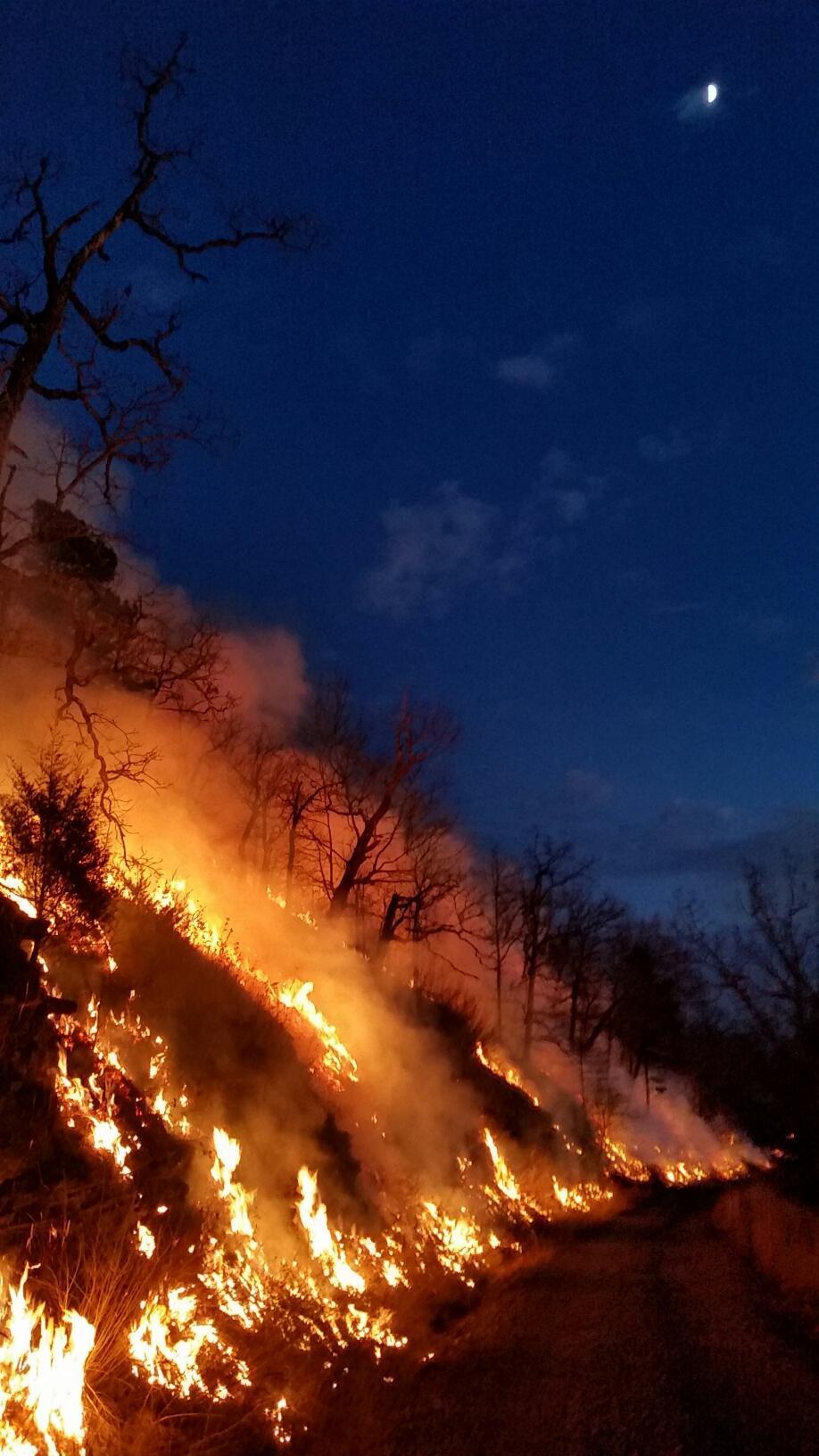
Tom's Mill Fire, 2017

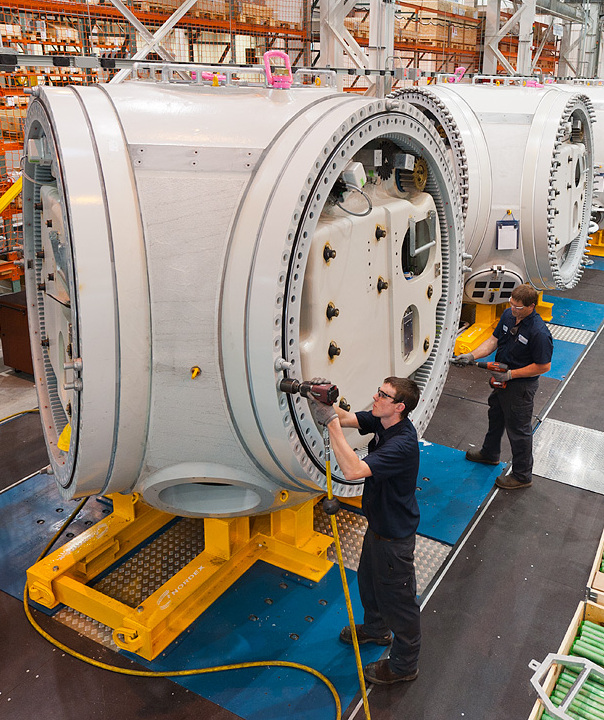
Wind turbine factory, Jonesboro

There are concerns about the impact climate change will have on water levels in the state. According to the United States Environmental Protection Agency (EPA), droughts pose challenges for water management and river transportation; if the spring is unexpectedly dry, reservoirs may have too little water during summer. During droughts, the Corps of Engineers releases water from dams to maintain navigation on the Arkansas River, where barges carry freight worth more than $4 billion during a typical year. The Corps of Engineers tries to keep channels at least nine feet deep, as low water levels increase transportation costs by forcing boats to carry smaller loads. Increased drought severity is expected to exacerbate this problem, potentially affecting shipping on the Mississippi River. According to the EPA, a drought in 2012 restricted channels and cost the region over $275 million. This drought not only affected Arkansas but affected many other states in the U.S as well. In the year of 2012 several states experienced the worst drought to date. According to the U.S Drought Monitor, the week of August 14, 2012 about 53.6% of Arkansas land was affected by D4 or exceptional drought.

== Economic and social impacts ==
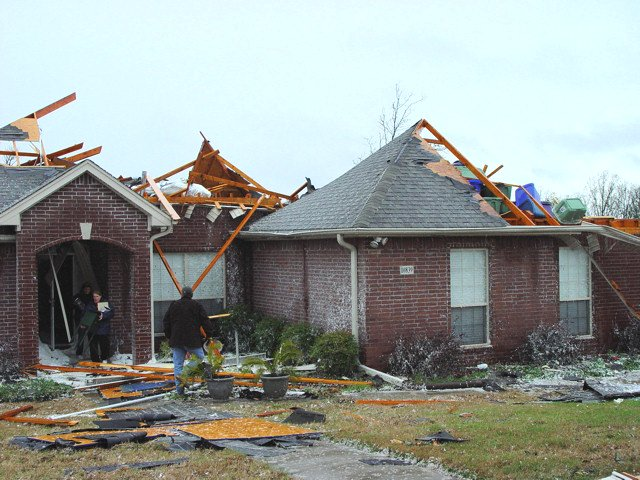
Tornado damage, Little Rock, Arkansas April 2008

=== Agriculture ===
According to the United States Environmental Protection Agency, changing the atmosphere may have both harmful and beneficial effects on farming. They project that 70 years from now, Arkansas is likely to have 30 to 60 days per year with temperatures above 95 °F (35 °C), compared with 15 to 30 days today. Hot weather causes cows to eat less and grow more slowly, and it can threaten their health. They note that even during the next few decades, hotter summers are likely to reduce yields of corn and rice. However, the EPA also notes that higher concentrations of atmospheric carbon dioxide will increase crop yields, and that fertilizing effect is likely to offset the harmful effects of heat on soybeans and cotton, assuming that adequate water remains available. On farms without irrigation, however, increasingly severe droughts could cause more crop failures.

In addition, more frequent and intense heavy-rainfall events may result in increased soil erosion as well as flooding.

=== Forests ===
According to the EPA, higher temperatures and changes in rainfall are unlikely to substantially reduce forest cover in Arkansas, although the composition of those forests may change. More droughts would reduce forest productivity, and climate change is also likely to increase the damage from insects and diseases, as well as increase the intensity and frequency of forest fires. They note that longer growing seasons and increased carbon dioxide concentrations could more than offset the losses from those factors. In northern Arkansas, forests are likely to have more pine and fewer hickory trees.

== Responses ==
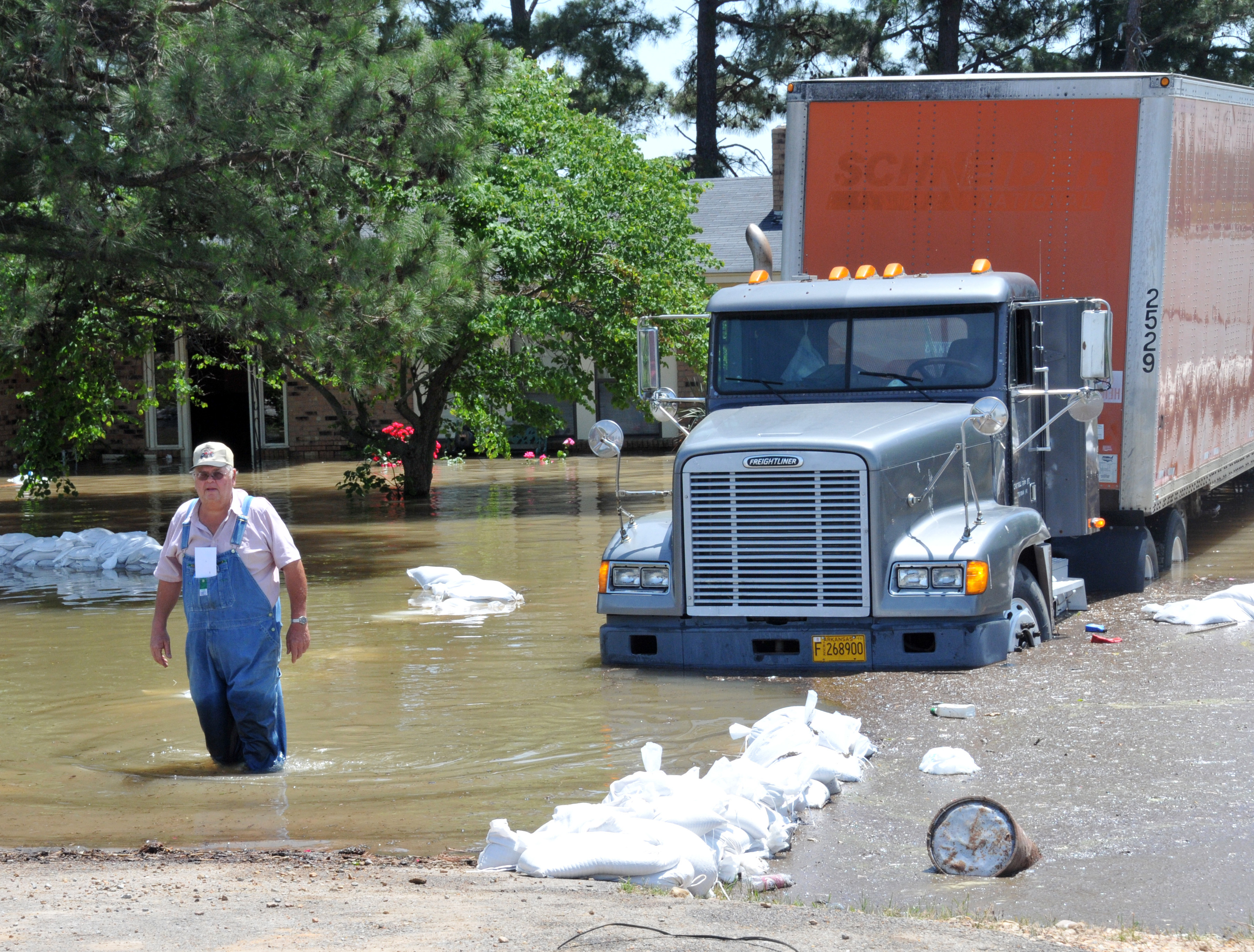
Flooding near Jonesboro, Arkansas 2011

=== Climate adaptation and climate action plans ===
Climate action plans have been developed by the City of Fayetteville and the Arkansas Game and Fish Commission.

The Southern Climate Impacts Planning Program released its Simple Planning Tool for Arkansas Climate Hazards in 2018.

== See also ==
- Climate of Arkansas
- Plug-in electric vehicles in Arkansas
- Solar power in Arkansas
- Wind power in Arkansas
- List of U.S. states and territories by carbon dioxide emissions
