= Leatherwood Wilderness =

Wilderness area

Leatherwood wilderness
- IUCN category Ib (wilderness area)

- Location within the United States
- Location: Baxter County, Arkansas USA
- Nearest city: Big Flat, Arkansas
- Coordinates: 36°03′31″N 92°21′30″W
- Area: 16,838 acres (68.14 km^{2})
- Established: 1984
- Governing body: U.S. Forest Service

The Leatherwood Wilderness, a 16,838 acres (68.14 km^{2}) federally designated wilderness area, is located within the Ozark-St. Francis National Forest in Arkansas is the largest wilderness area in Arkansas. The US Congress designated the Leatherwood Wilderness in 1984 and the US Forest Service manages the land.

The Leatherwood Wilderness Area takes its name from Leatherwood Creek, the largest waterway that runs through this wilderness area, and from the Dirca palustris plant, locally known as the leatherwood plant, which is common in streamside zones in the region.

== Terrain ==
The Leatherwood Wilderness Area contains some of the most broken and rugged terrain within the Ozarks. In several locations, sheer cliffs over 1,200 feet (370 m) rise about creek drainage areas. Backpacking and camping are allowed in the entire wilderness area, but no pre-made trails exist and, because of the secluded nature of the terrain, caution is advised.

Hikers will occasionally run onto old roads, farms, and cabins from before the area was designated as a wilderness area that are returning to nature.

Many caves exist within the wilderness area, but all of them are closed to human entrance to prevent the spread of white nose syndrome among bat populations.

== Wildlife ==
The Leatherwood Wilderness is home to white-tailed deer, wild turkeys, black bears, as well as various bat species.

Besides Dirca palustris, the Leatherwood Wilderness is home to a wide variety of trees, including oak, hickory, and gum trees. The wilderness also has several cedar glades and pine stands, some of them old-growth. Other common plants include spicebush.

== See also ==
- List of U.S. Wilderness Areas
- List of old growth forests
