= Eastern leatherwood =

Eastern leatherwood is a common name for several plants and may refer to:

- Eucryphia moorei, a tree native to Australia
- Dirca palustris, a shrub native to North America
