= North Sylamore Creek Bridge =

- U.S. National Register of Historic Places
- Location within Arkansas Location within the United States
- Nearest city: Fifty-Six, Arkansas
- Coordinates: 35°59′51″N 92°12′46″W
- Area: less than one acre
- Built: 1931
- Architect: Lyle & McWilliam
- Architectural style: Baltimore Deck Truss
- MPS: Historic Bridges of Arkansas MPS
- NRHP reference No.: 10000034
- Added to NRHP: February 24, 2010

The North Sylamore Creek Bridge is a historic bridge in the Ozark-St. Francis National Forest in northern Stone County, Arkansas. It is a Baltimore deck truss bridge, carrying Forest Service Road 1102 over North Sylamore Creek near the Gunner Pool Recreation Area. The bridge has two spans, each 110 feet (34 m) long, with a total structure length of 357 feet (109 m). It rests on concrete piers and abutments. The bridge was built in 1931, and is the only known example of this type of truss (a variant of the more-common Pratt truss) in the state.

The bridge was listed on the National Register of Historic Places in 2010.

== See also ==
- National Register of Historic Places listings in Stone County, Arkansas
- List of bridges on the National Register of Historic Places in Arkansas
