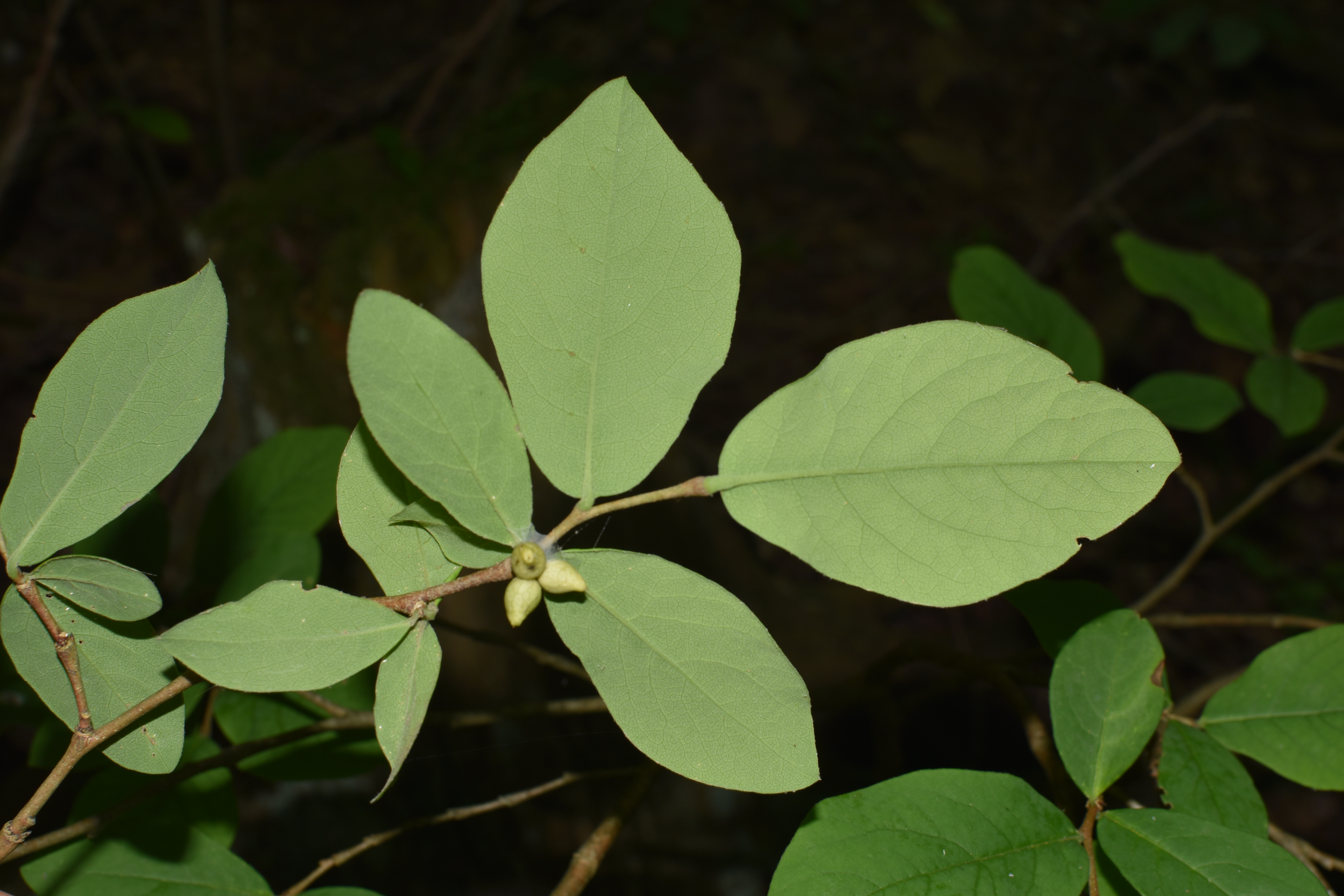
- Leaves and fruits, Eureka Springs, Arkansas

Conservation status
- Critically Imperiled (NatureServe)

Scientific classification
- Kingdom: Plantae
- Clade: Tracheophytes
- Clade: Angiosperms
- Clade: Eudicots
- Clade: Rosids
- Order: Malvales
- Family: Thymelaeaceae
- Genus: Dirca
- Species: D. decipiens

Binomial name
- Dirca decipiens A.J.Floden

= Dirca decipiens =

Species of flowering plant

Dirca decipiens, the Ozark leatherwood, is a deciduous shrub endemic to northwestern Arkansas, southeastern Kansas, and southwestern Missouri. It is distinguished from the more widespread eastern leatherwood by its sessile fruits and finely hairy leaves and stems.
