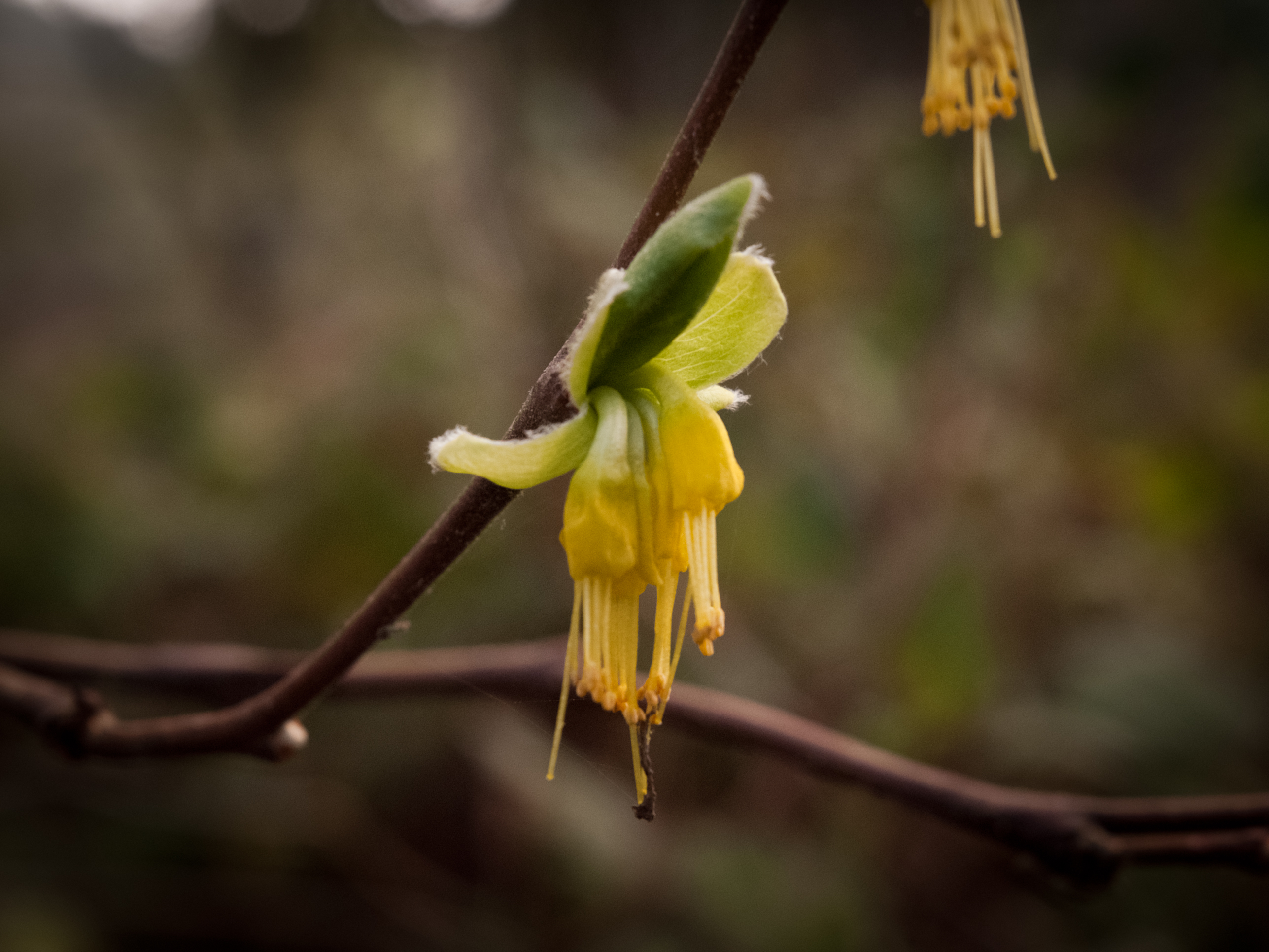

Conservation status
- Imperiled (NatureServe)

Scientific classification
- Kingdom: Plantae
- Clade: Tracheophytes
- Clade: Angiosperms
- Clade: Eudicots
- Clade: Rosids
- Order: Malvales
- Family: Thymelaeaceae
- Genus: Dirca
- Species: D. occidentalis

Binomial name
- Dirca occidentalis A.Gray

= Dirca occidentalis =

Species of flowering plant

Dirca occidentalis, the western leatherwood, is a deciduous shrub with leaves three to seven centimeters in length. Yellow flowers emerge prior to leafing. It grows on moist and shaded slopes. It is rare and endemic to the San Francisco Bay area of California. Its closest relative, Dirca palustris, lives in the eastern half of North America.

== Gallery ==
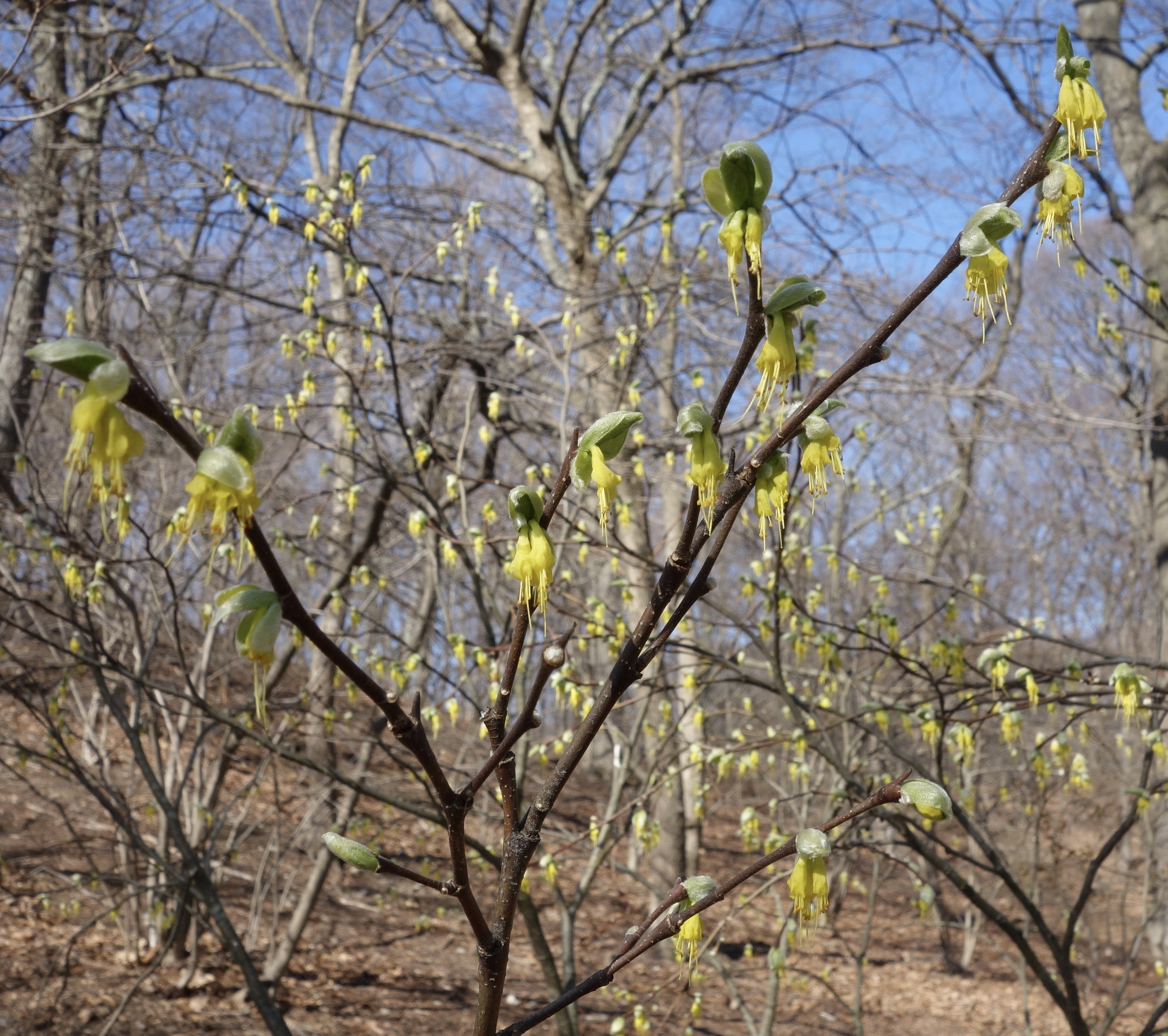
In flower, Arnold Arboretum of Harvard University accession #311-86*A

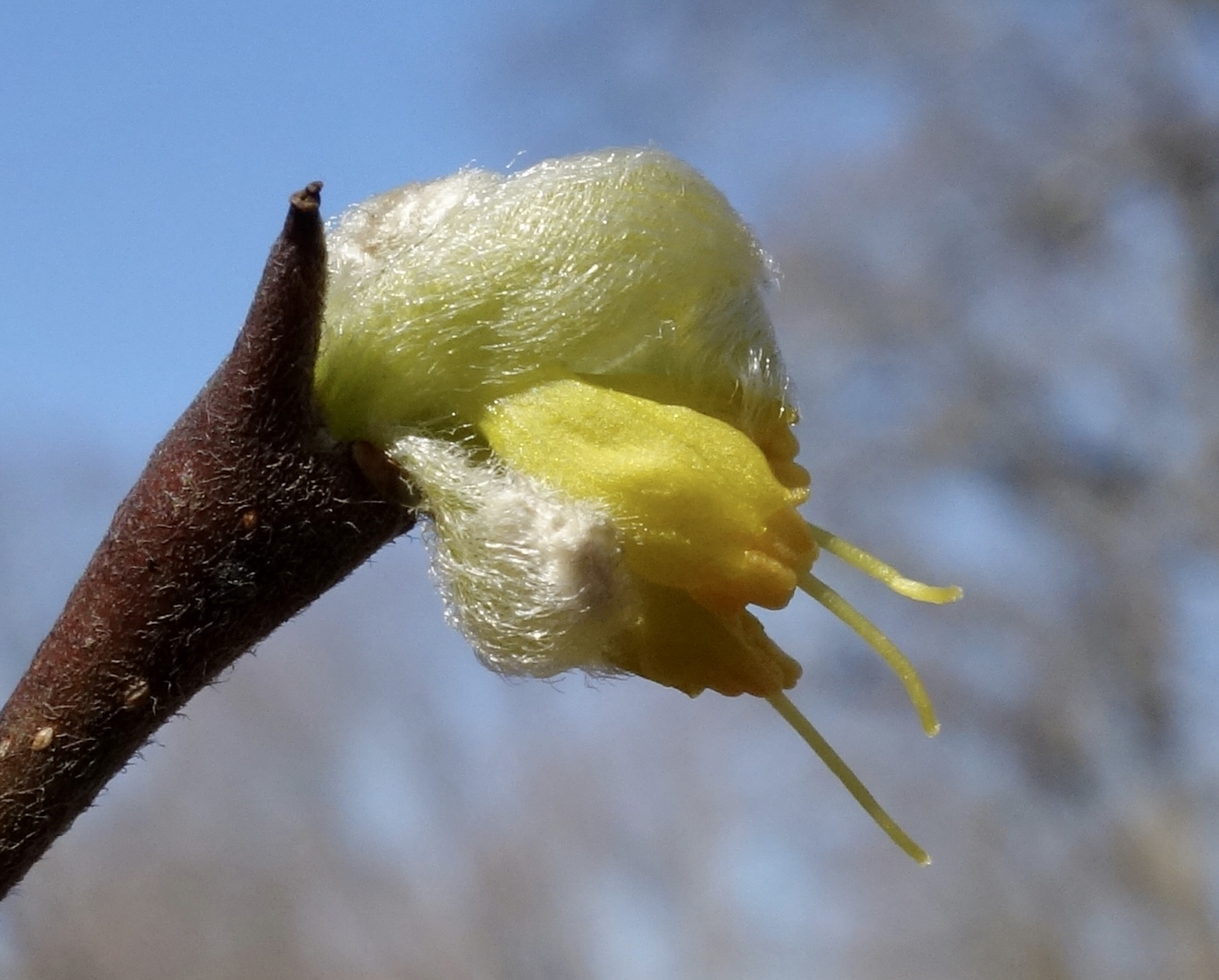
Flower detail

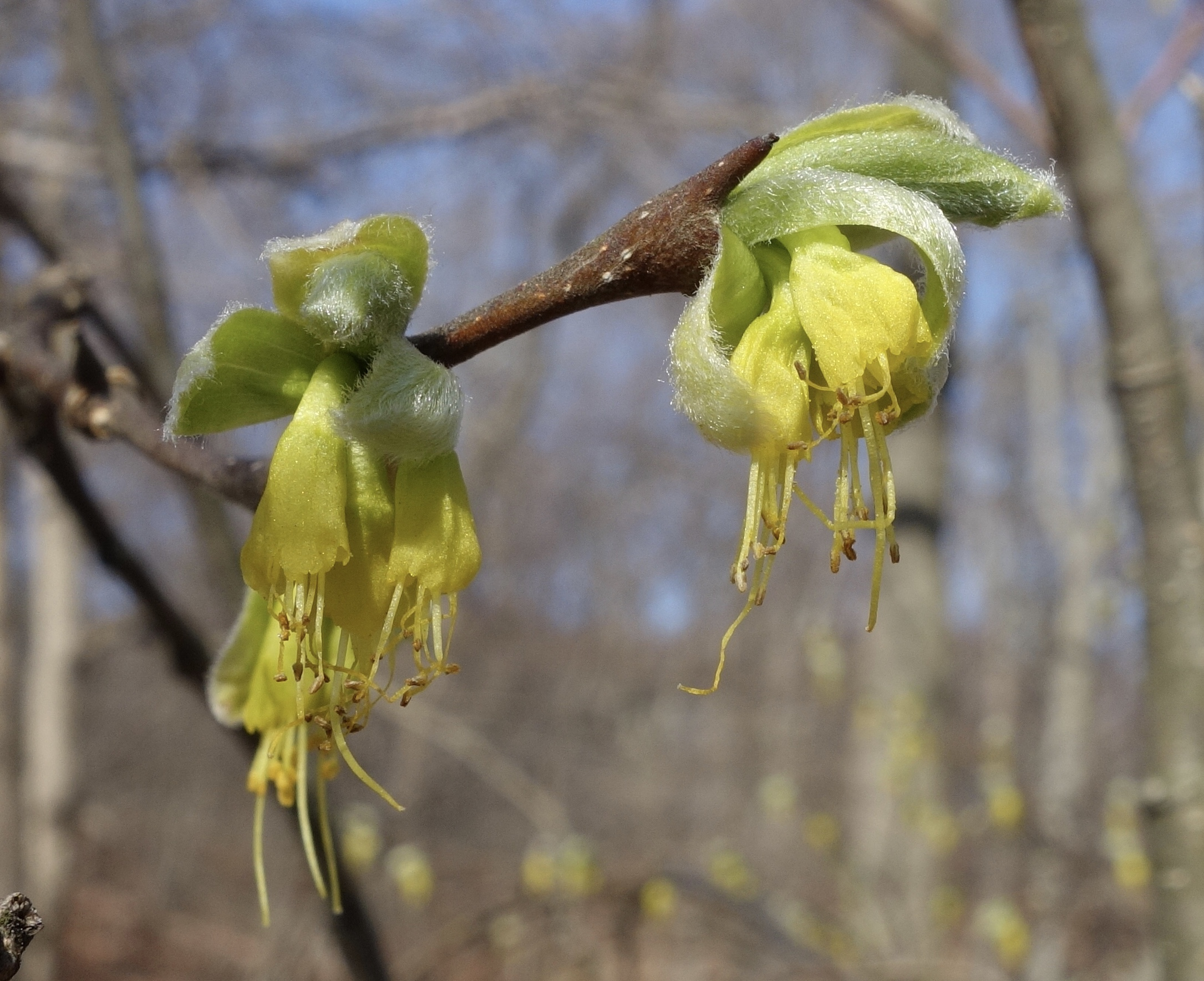
Flowers
