= Richland Creek Wilderness =

Wilderness area in Arkansas, United States

- IUCN category Ib (wilderness area)
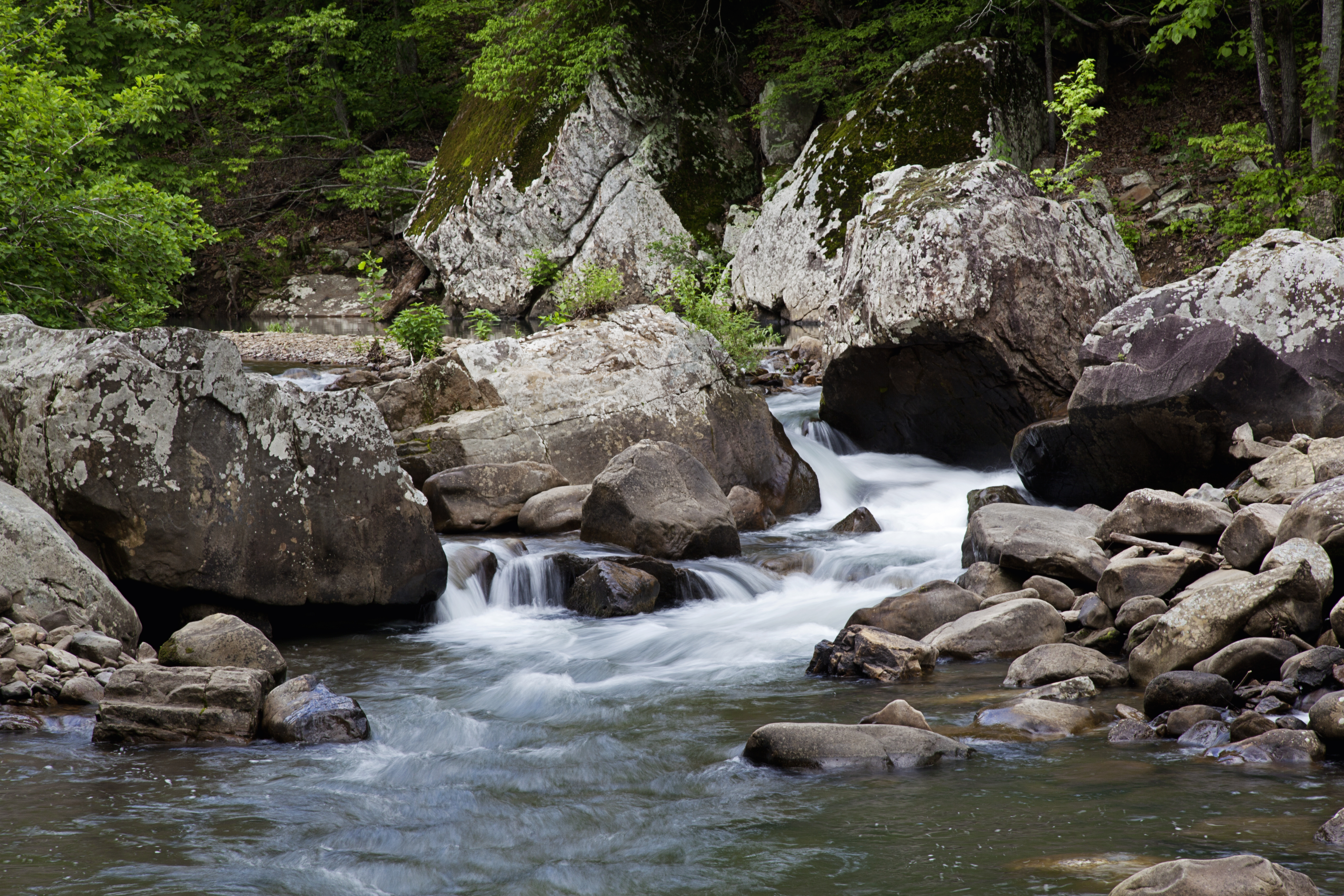
- Richland Creek

- Location within the United States
- Location: Newton and Searcy counties Arkansas, USA
- Nearest city: Russellville
- Coordinates: 35°53′50″N 93°27′26″W
- Area: 11,801 acres (4,776 ha)
- Established: 1984
- Governing body: U.S. Forest Service

Richland Creek Wilderness is located in the U.S. state of Arkansas. Created by an act of Congress in 1984, the wilderness covers an area of 11,801 acres (48 km²). Contained within Ozark-St. Francis National Forest, the wilderness is managed by the U.S. Forest Service.

== Description ==
This infrequently visited wilderness is composed of second and third growth oak-hickory forest with intermittent portions of shortleaf pine. Richland Creek and Long Devil's Fork Creek intersect within the area, both are surrounded by steep sandstone bluffs. The area was formerly used for logging, and many trails consist of former logging roads. Black bears are known to inhabit the wilderness, along with White-tailed deer, wild turkey, skunks, opossums, minks and pheasants.

U.S. Wilderness Areas do not allow motorized or mechanized vehicles, including bicycles. Although camping and fishing are usually allowed with a proper permit, no roads or buildings are constructed and there is also no logging or mining, in compliance with the 1964 Wilderness Act. Wilderness areas within National Forests and Bureau of Land Management areas also allow hunting in season.

== See also ==
- List of U.S. Wilderness Areas
