= North Sylamore Creek =

Waterway in Arkansas, USA

Coordinates: 35°56′26″N 92°07′13″W

National Wild and Scenic River
- Type: Scenic
- Designated: April 22, 1992

North Sylamore Creek is a tributary of South Sylamore Creek in Stone County, Arkansas in the United States.

== Description ==
The northern branch of Sylamore Creek in the Sylamo Valley Region is a wild and scenic river managed by the US Forest Service. It runs through the easternmost portion of the Boston Mountains ecoregion, and is well known for its beautiful, crystal clear waters and biodiversity. The free-flowing stream is located entirely within the Sylamo District of the Ozark-St. Francis National Forest.

== Recreation ==
The North Sylamore Creek is most commonly used for floating and swimming, when the levels of the creek allow. As a wild and scenic river, the water levels of the creek often vary wildly and unpredictably. More recently, the North Sylamore Creek Trail was built through the area. It is a fork of the Ozark Highlands Trail, and the future Trans-Ozark Trail. The trail is 22.8 miles long, and is often used for backpacking and other recreation opportunities.

== Crossings ==
- North Sylamore Creek Bridge
