= Dirca mexicana =

Scientific classification
- Kingdom: Plantae
- Clade: Tracheophytes
- Clade: Angiosperms
- Clade: Eudicots
- Clade: Rosids
- Order: Malvales
- Family: Thymelaeaceae
- Genus: Dirca
- Species: D. mexicana

Binomial name
- Dirca mexicana G.L.Nesom & Mayfield, 1995

Species of flowering plant

Dirca mexicana, the Mexican leatherwood, is a low shrub with a very restricted population in Tamaulipas, Mexico. However, it does surprisingly well in the much colder environment of Ames, Iowa. Like most Dirca species, it blooms in early spring.

== Habitat ==
Mexican leatherwood grows in forested karstic limestone terrain at an elevation of about 1800 meters. It is shaded mainly by large Douglas-fir, shagbark hickory, Mexican weeping pine and laurinate oak. Some musclewood and American sweetgum are also present.
