= Hurricane Creek (Arkansas) =

Tributary of Big Piney Creek in Arkansas, US

Coordinates: 35°41′52″N 93°14′40″W

Hurricane Creek

Hurricane Creek is a tributary to the Big Piney Creek, a river in Ozark-St. Francis National Forest in the state of Arkansas, which is a tributary of the Arkansas River and which is, in turn, part of the Mississippi River System. It is managed by the United States Forest Service and categorized as one of the Wild and Scenic Rivers of the United States.

== Location ==
Hurricane Creek is in Johnson and Newton counties of northwestern Arkansas, on the Buffalo Ranger District, in Ozark National Forest. Deer, Corwell, and Pelsor are the unincorporated communities in the region. It is about 40 miles to the north of Russelville and 3 miles west of Pelsor. Hurricane Creek has a mean discharge of 342 cubic feet per second.

=== Access ===
FDR 1208 west of Scenic Byway 7, north of Pelsor/Sand Gap provides primary access to Hurricane Creek. Another access is FDR 1202/1209 from the community of Deer east and south of Highway 16. This goes to the old community of Chancel where Buck Branch enters Hurricane. It is also accessible via FDR 1002 coursing north from the Fort Douglas bridge to the junction of Hurricane and Big Piney Creek.

== Hurricane Creek Wilderness ==
The creek is 15.5 miles in length, of which 2.4 miles is classified as wild and 13.1 miles as scenic. It flows through the Hurricane Creek Wilderness, established by the 1984 Arkansas Wilderness Act. It comprises 15,177 acres of land in the Boston Mountains.

The mountains in the area are all actually plateaus, with elevation of 2,200 feet and above. The bluffs, some over 100 feet high, are made of limestone and sandstone.

Trees include second and third-growth oak and hickory, and shortleaf pine. The shrubbery consists mainly of dogwood, serviceberry, and witch hazel.
