= Solar power in Arkansas =

Overview of solar power in the U.S. state of Arkansas

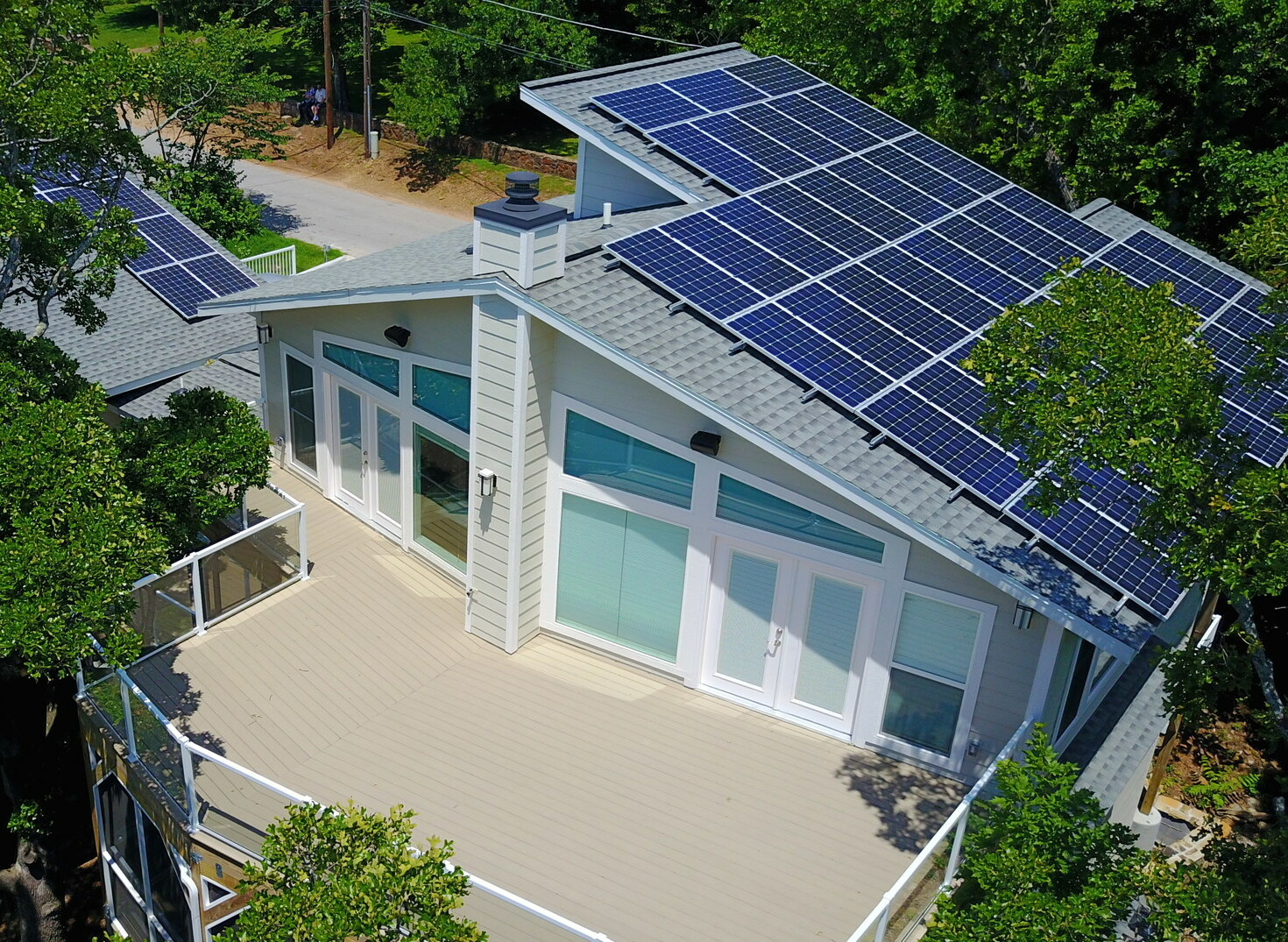
Home solar installation, Fayetteville

Solar power in Arkansas on rooftops can provide 33.3% of all electricity used in Arkansas from 12,200 MW of solar panels.

Net metering is available to all residential consumers up to 25 kW and 300 kW for non-residential users, but is lost once a year at the end of the 12 month billing cycle, which needs to be in the spring to avoid losing excess summer generation. IREC best practices, based on experience, recommends no limits to net metering, individual or aggregate, and perpetual roll over of kWh credits. A rebate program is available for systems up to 25 kW, which pays $1.50/kWh generated during the first year of operation. A 5 kW system, costing $17,500 after receiving a 30% federal tax credit, would produce about 6484 kWh/year, providing a rebate of approximately $9,726. The federal tax credit is available through 2021.

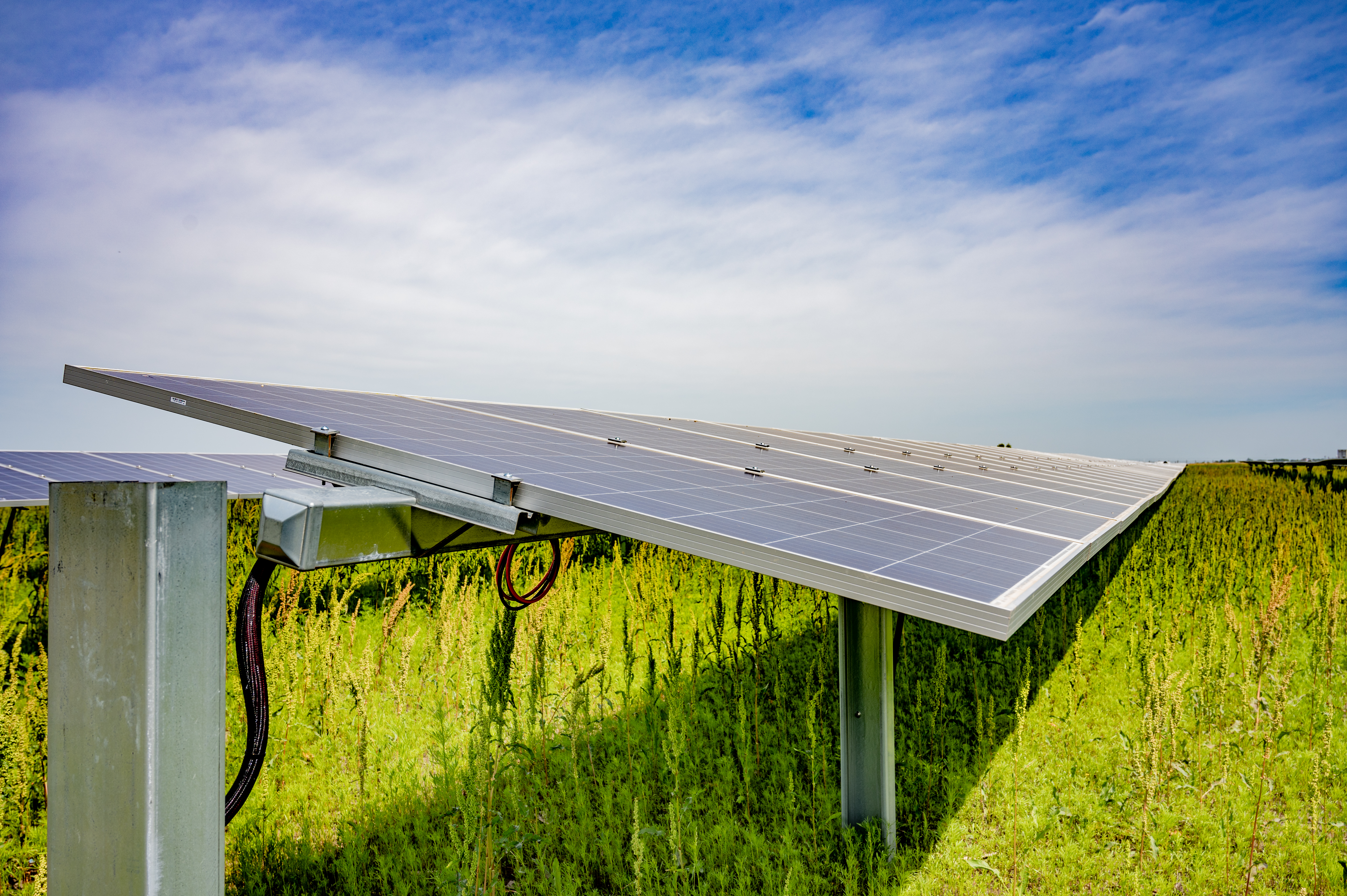
Solar array near Hope

In 2010 the Fayetteville Public Library installed a 13.5 kW solar array, and received a rebate of $30,821.10 for the 20,547 kWh generated.

The largest company in Arkansas, and occasionally the world, Walmart, set a goal in 2005 of being powered 100% by renewable energy. By April 2012 they were generating 4% locally, mainly from rooftop solar panels, and overall using 22% renewable energy.

== Currently operating (Note: As of December 31, 2025) ==
=== The Arkansas River Valley region ===
Solar Facilities in Arkansas (The Arkansas River Valley Region)
#	Plant Name	Utility Name	County	Capacity (MW)	Operating Year
1	Arkansas Valley	Today's Power, Inc.	Franklin	1.0	2023
2	Branch Solar Farm	Oklahoma Gas & Electric Co	Franklin	5.0	2021
3	City of Clarksville	Today's Power, Inc.	Johnson	10.0	2025
4	City of Paris Solar	Today's Power, Inc.	Logan	1.5	2020
5	Fayetteville Public Schools (SWEPCO)	Nabholz Solar FPS, LLC	Logan	4.0	2023
6	LRWRA	Entegrity Solar LRWRA, LLC	Logan	4.0	2023
7	NLRED 2MW	Today's Power, Inc.	Pulaski	2.0	2024
8	NLRED 5MW	Today's Power, Inc.	Pulaski	5.0	2024
9	Scenic Hill Solar III	Scenic Hill Solar III LLC	Johnson	5.0	2017
10	Scenic Hill Solar IV, LLC	Greenbacker Renewable Energy Corporation	Johnson	2.2	2019
11	Southside SD	Entegrity Solar Southside SD, LLC	Pulaski	1.0	2023
12	Zeuber	Today's Power, Inc.	Pulaski	4.6	2023

=== The Capital region ===
Solar Facilities in Arkansas (The Capital Region)
#	Plant Name	Utility Name	County	Capacity (MW)	Operating Year
1	NLRED 2MW	Today's Power, Inc.	Pulaski	2.0	2024
2	NLRED 5MW	Today's Power, Inc.	Pulaski	5.0	2024
3	Southside SD	Entegrity Solar Southside SD, LLC	Pulaski	1.0	2023
4	Zeuber	Today's Power, Inc.	Pulaski	4.6	2023

=== The Delta / Mississippi Alluvial Plain region ===
Solar Facilities in Arkansas (The Delta / Mississippi Alluvial Plain Region)
#	Plant Name	Utility Name	County	Capacity (MW)	Operating Year
1	ADC Varner	Entegrity Solar ADC, LLC	Lincoln	4.9	2024
2	Ashley-Chicot Solar	Today's Power, Inc.	Ashley	1.0	2018
3	Big Cypress Solar, LLC	Big Cypress Solar, LLC	Crittenden	180.0	2023
4	C&L	Today's Power, Inc.	Lincoln	1.0	2020
5	Chicot Solar	Chicot Solar, LLC	Chicot	100.0	2020
6	Clay County Electrical Cooperative	Today's Power, Inc.	Clay	1.0	2020
7	Craighead Electric Solar One	Today's Power, Inc.	Craighead	1.0	2018
8	Crooked Lake Solar, LLC	Crooked Lake Solar, LLC	Mississippi	175.0	2024
9	Crossett SD	Entegrity Solar Crossett SD, LLC	Ashley	1.0	2022
10	Crossett Solar	Cubico USA, LLC	Ashley	100.0	2024
11	Driver Solar	Entergy Arkansas LLC	Mississippi	150.0	2024
12	Farmers Electric Cooperative	Today's Power, Inc.	Jackson	1.0	2019
13	Flat Fork Solar	Flat Fork Solar, LLC	St Francis	200.0	2025
14	Forgeview Solar	Forgeview Solar, LLC	Mississippi	200.0	2025
15	Forrest City- Eldridge Road	Greenbacker Renewable Energy Corporation	St Francis	1.0	2021
16	Forrest City- Prison Site	Greenbacker Renewable Energy Corporation	St Francis	1.0	2021
17	Jonesboro CWL Solar Park	City Water and Light Plant - (AR)	Craighead	10.0	2022
18	Long Lake Solar, LLC	Long Lake Solar, LLC	Phillips	200.0	2025
19	Newport Solar Project	Newport Solar, LLC	Jackson	180.0	2023
20	Prairie Mist Solar	Prairie Mist Solar Project, LLC	Ashley	109.2	2024
21	Quartz Solar, LLC	RWE Clean Energy	Cross	135.0	2025
22	Rivercrest SD	Entegrity Solar Rivercrest SD, LLC	Mississippi	1.0	2022
23	Star City School District	Today's Power, Inc.	Lincoln	1.0	2021
24	Stuttgart Solar	Stuttgart Solar, LLC	Arkansas	81.0	2018
25	Walnut Bend Solar Station PV	Entergy Arkansas LLC	Lee	100.0	2024
26	West Memphis Solar Station	Entergy Arkansas LLC	Crittenden	180.0	2024
27	White River Medical Center	Entegrity Solar WRMC, LLC	Jackson	2.9	2023
28	Woodruff County Solar	Arkansas Electric Coop Corp	Woodruff	122.0	2024
29	Woodruff Electric Cooperative	Today's Power, Inc.	St. Francis	1.0	2019

=== The Ouachitas region ===
Solar Facilities in Arkansas (The Ouachitas Region)
#	Plant Name	Utility Name	County	Capacity (MW)	Operating Year
1	ACC	Entegrity Solar ACC, LLC	Howard	2.0	2023
2	Hot Springs 2020	Greenbacker Renewable Energy Corporation	Garland	1.0	2021
3	Rich Mountain Electric Cooperative	Today's Power, Inc.	Polk	1.0	2020
4	South Central Electric Cooperative	Today's Power, Inc.	Clark	1.0	2019
5	UADA	Entegrity Solar UA AG, LLC	Howard	2.8	2023
6	Veolia (Gum Springs)	Today's Power, Inc.	Clark	5.0	2024

=== The Ozarks region ===
Solar Facilities in Arkansas (The Ozarks Region)
#	Plant Name	Utility Name	County	Capacity (MW)	Operating Year
1	Arkansas Valley	Today's Power, Inc.	Franklin	1.0	2023
2	Berryville School District Solar	Today's Power, Inc.	Carroll	1.0	2018
3	Branch Solar Farm	Oklahoma Gas & Electric Co	Franklin	5.0	2021
4	City of Clarksville	Today's Power, Inc.	Johnson	10.0	2025
5	City of Green Forest (Carroll)	Entegrity Solar Green Forest, LLC	Carroll	1.2	2022
6	Fayetteville Public Schools (Ozarks)	Nabholz Solar FPS Ozarks, LLC	Washington	1.0	2023
7	Hindsville	Today's Power, Inc.	Madison	5.0	2025
8	Noland Wastewater Treatment Plant Hybrid	Today's Power, Inc.	Washington	5.0	2019
9	North Arkansas Electric Cooperative	Today's Power, Inc.	Fulton	1.0	2021
10	Ozark Solar Park	Today's Power, Inc.	Washington	2.4	2021
11	Ozarks Natural Energy Community Solar	Ozarks Electric Coop Corp - (AR)	Washington	1.0	2016
12	Scenic Hill Solar III	Scenic Hill Solar III LLC	Johnson	5.0	2017
13	Scenic Hill Solar IV, LLC	Greenbacker Renewable Energy Corporation	Johnson	2.2	2019
14	Springdale School District	Today's Power, Inc.	Washington	2.9	2022
15	Westside Wastewater Treatment Plant Hybr	Today's Power, Inc.	Washington	5.0	2019
16	XNA (NW AR Natnl Airport)	Today's Power, Inc.	Benton	3.0	2025

=== The Timberlands region ===
Solar Facilities in Arkansas (The Timberlands Region)
#	Plant Name	Utility Name	County	Capacity (MW)	Operating Year
1	ACC	Entegrity Solar ACC, LLC	Howard	2.0	2023
2	El Dorado AR	Entegrity Solar El Dorado SD, LLC	Union	1.8	2024
3	General Dynamics	Today's Power, Inc.	Ouachita	2.0	2020
4	SAU Tech	Today's Power, Inc.	Ouachita	1.0	2019
5	SR Camden	SR Camden, LLC	Calhoun	12.0	2015
6	South Central Electric Cooperative	Today's Power, Inc.	Clark	1.0	2019
7	Southwest Arkansas Electric	Today's Power, Inc.	Miller	1.0	2020
8	UADA	Entegrity Solar UA AG, LLC	Howard	2.8	2023
9	Veolia (Gum Springs)	Today's Power, Inc.	Clark	5.0	2024

== Statistics ==
Source: NREL

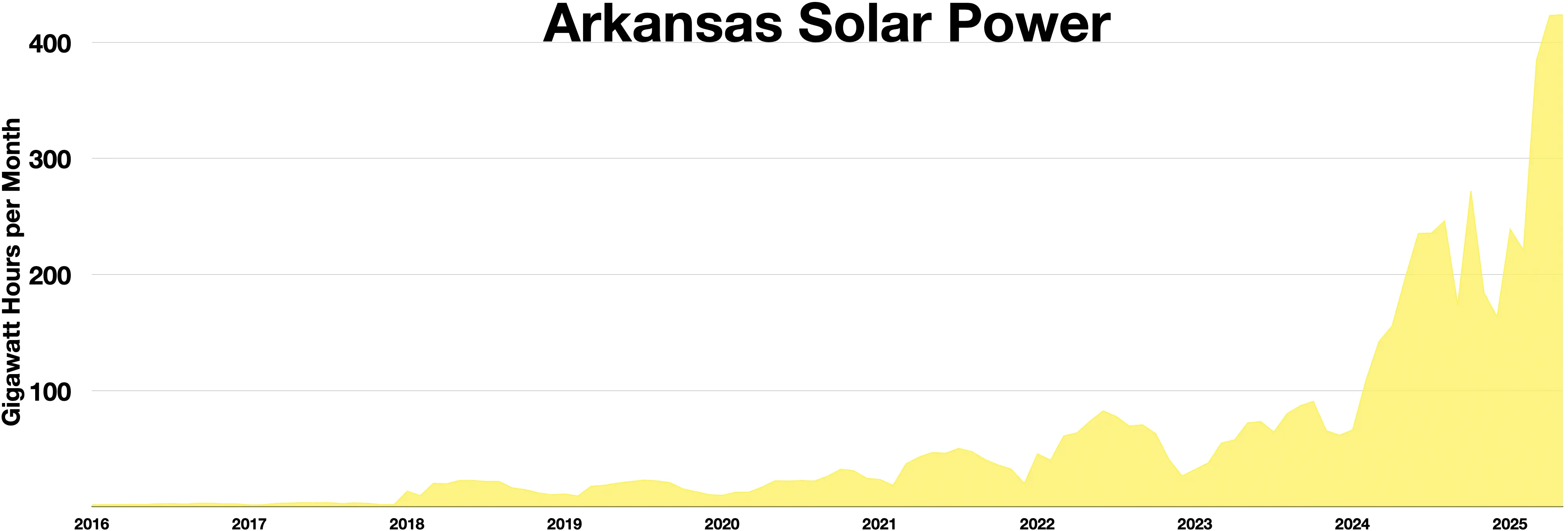
Arkansas solar power

Grid-connected PV capacity (MWp)
Year(s)	Capacity	Installed	% change
2009	0.2	0.2	
2010	1.0	0.6	400%
2011	1.1	0.1	10%
2012	1.5	0.6	55%
2013	1.8	0.2	13%
2014	3.8	2	111%
2015	20.1	16.3	429%
2016	24.1	4	19.9%
2017	30.1	6	24.9%
2018	180	170.9	498%
2019	220	40	22.2%
2020	381.1	161.1	73.2%
2021	553.4	172.3	%
2022	632	78.6	%

Utility-scale solar generation in Arkansas (GWh)
Year	Total	Jan	Feb	Mar	Apr	May	Jun	Jul	Aug	Sep	Oct	Nov	Dec
2015	1	0	0	0	0	0	0	0	0	0	0	0	1
2016	26	1	2	2	2	2	2	3	2	3	3	2	2
2017	31	1	2	3	3	3	3	3	3	3	3	2	2
2018	205	13	9	20	20	23	23	22	22	16	15	12	10
2019	209	11	9	17	18	20	21	25	24	22	17	14	11
2020	274	11	14	14	19	25	24	25	24	28	33	32	25
2021	328	24	20	39	45	49	49	52	50				

== See also ==
- Wind power in Arkansas
- Solar power in the United States
- Renewable energy in the United States
