= Tom's Mill Fire =

2017 wildfire in Arkansas, United States

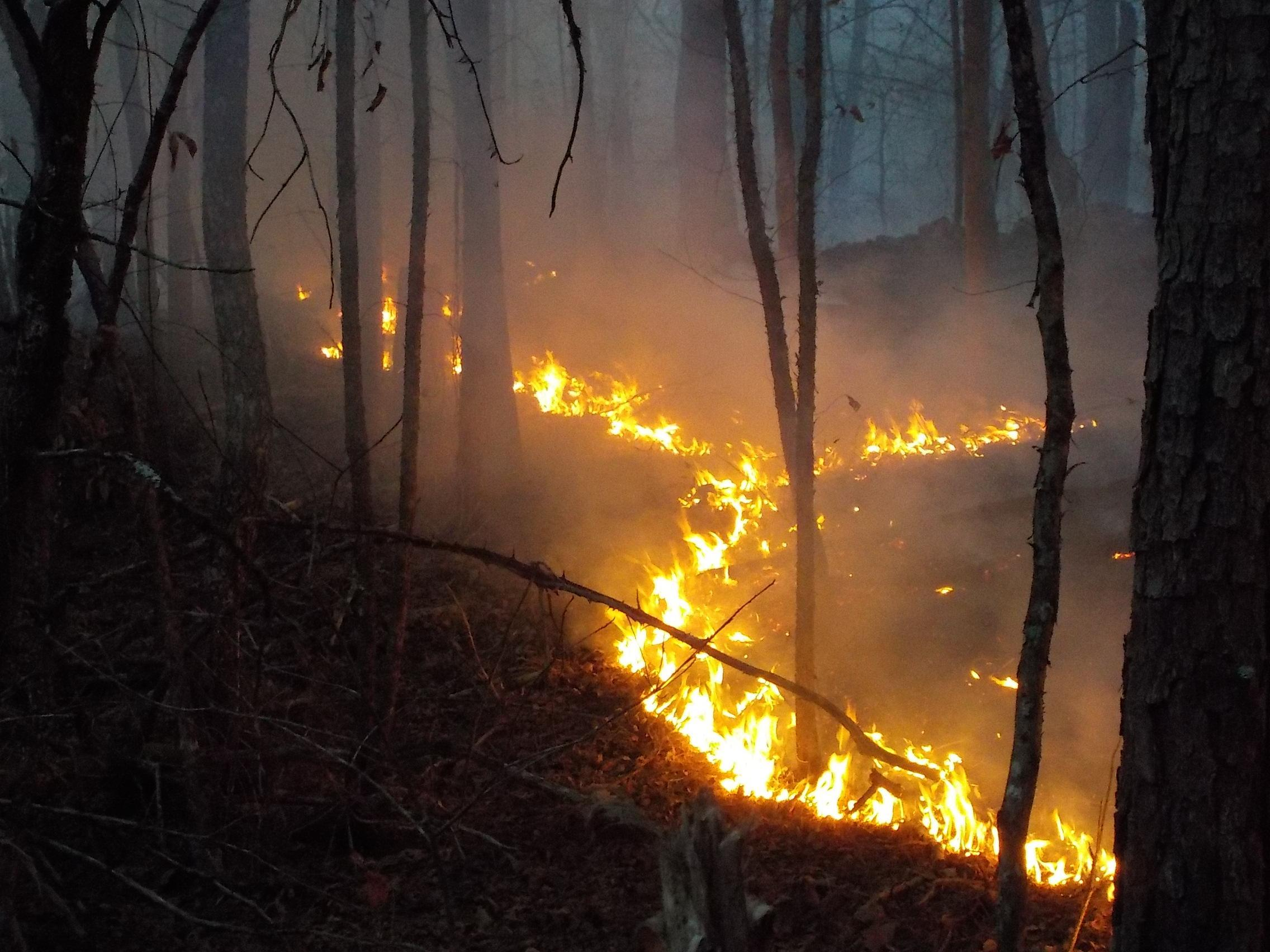
- Flames from the Tom's Mill Fire back down the mountain during burnout operations on November 28, 2017
- Date: November 25, 2017 – November 29, 2017
- Location: Ozark–St. Francis National Forest, Arkansas, United States
- Coordinates: 35.558°N 93.251°W

Statistics
- Burned area: 2,000 acres (8 km^{2})

Ignition
- Cause: Unknown

Map
- Location of fire in Arkansas.

The Tom's Mill Fire was a wildfire that burned in the Ozark–St. Francis National Forest, 3.5 miles north of Lees Chapel, Arkansas in the United States. The fire, which was first reported on November 25, 2017, burned a total of 2,000 acres (8 km^{2}). The cause of the fire remains unknown.

== Events ==
The Tom's Mill Fire was reported on November 25, 2017, at 2:45 PM in the Ozark–St. Francis National Forest, approximately 3.5 miles north of Lees Chapel. The cause of the fire is unknown. It was fueled by hardwood litter and timber. Fire crews struggled to fight the fire, which grew to 2,000 acres (8 km^{2}) by November 29, due to the steep and rugged terrain in the area. The United States Forest Service stopped reporting on the fire on November 29, 2017, at 90 percent containment.
