= Plug-in electric vehicles in Arkansas =

As of June 2022, there were about 3,000 electric vehicles in Arkansas.

== Government policy ==
As of 2022, the state government charges a $200 annual registration fee for electric vehicles.

== Charging stations ==
As of May 2022, there were about 160 public charging stations in Arkansas.

The Infrastructure Investment and Jobs Act, signed into law in November 2021, allocates US$54 million to charging stations in Arkansas.

== Manufacturing ==
Arkansas has been proposed as a potential hub for electric vehicle manufacturing.
