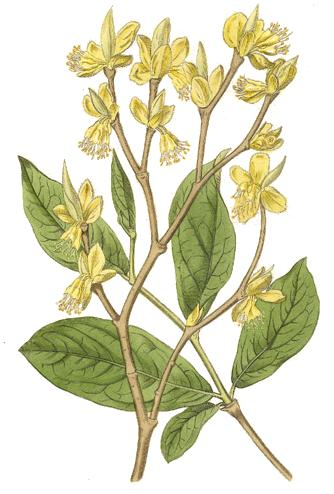
- Dirca palustris

Scientific classification
- Kingdom: Plantae
- Clade: Tracheophytes
- Clade: Angiosperms
- Clade: Eudicots
- Clade: Rosids
- Order: Malvales
- Family: Thymelaeaceae
- Subfamily: Thymelaeoideae
- Genus: Dirca; L. (1753)

Type species
- Dirca palustris

Species
- Dirca decipiens Floden; Dirca mexicana G.L.Nesom & Mayfield; Dirca occidentalis A.Gray; Dirca palustris L.

Synonyms
- Dofia Adans. (1763)

= Dirca =

Genus of flowering plants

Dirca is a genus of three or four species of shrubby flowering plants in the family Thymelaeaceae, native to North America. The genus is named after Dirce in Greek mythology. The general common name for this deciduous shrub is leatherwood; other names include moosewood, ropebark and the Powhatan-derived name wicopy, referring to its use as a fiber, wigub in the Algonquin languages. The stems of Dirca are exceptionally pliable and the bark is difficult to tear by hand; for this reason, its stems were used by Native Americans in eastern North America as thongs or ropes. The inner bark has cross-linked fibers that are short but strong and flexible. Members of the genus can grow to a maximum height of about three meters, and are often associated with rich, moist woods or slopes above creeks or streams.

D. palustris is a widespread species that grows in scattered populations throughout eastern North America, from Nova Scotia west to North Dakota and Oklahoma, and south to Florida. D. occidentalis grows in several counties in the San Francisco Bay area of California. D. mexicana was described in 1995 from one population in northeastern Mexico. In 2008, a fourth species, D. decipiens, was described from several populations in Kansas and Arkansas, at the southwestern limits of the range of D. palustris.

Dirca palustris is occasionally cultivated, although its slow growth seems to prevent its widespread use in horticulture. The shrub can be difficult to recognize because the flowers are small (less than one cm), displayed for only a short period in the early spring, and may be an undistinguished greenish-yellow. In the central part of its range, D. palustris is often found growing with the much more frequent spicebush, which also has small yellow flowers that appear before the leaves at a similar time.

Although it is listed as poisonous in some publications because its stems and leaves contain calcium oxalate crystals, its toxicity is not well understood. Caution must be used handling the plant, especially its bark, which causes severe contact dermatitis, with redness, blistering and sores according to ethnobotanists Drs. Steven Foster and James A. Duke, likewise the berries may have narcotic properties, although this claim remains unsubstantiated. Native Americans including the Ojibwe used the inner bark tea as a laxative, however minute doses cause burning of the tongue and salivating. Dirca has phenolic glycosides unique to this plant, which are chemical compounds with an aromatic phenol ring attached to a structure that splits apart in water into a sugar (glyco) and an aglycan (another compound).
