= Wind power in Arkansas =

Electricity from wind in one U.S. state

Wind power in Arkansas remains nearly untapped, with just a single wind turbine in the state. Arkansas does not have a renewable portfolio standard. Studies have concluded that while Arkansas is generally considered to have low wind resources, there are significant pockets of it throughout the state.

== Import by transmission ==
The Arkansas Electric Cooperative Corporation (AECC) purchases electrical power from wind farms outside the state, including 51MW from Flat Ridge 2 Wind Farm in Kansas. In 2013 AECC entered a long-term agreement to buy 150 megawatts of wind energy from Oklahoma from the RES Americas-built Origin Wind Farm, which has 75 turbines in Murray County and Carter County, Oklahoma, and came on line at the end of 2014. It was taken over by Enel.

=== Wind Catcher project ===
In 2018, SWEPCO, an Arkansas utility, faced opposition to its $4.5 billion Wind Catcher project, and indicated that ads opposing the project were being sponsored by an unknown non-profit, "Protect Our Pocketbooks".

SWEPCO entered a settlement in which it agreed to "provide a number of guarantees, including a cap on construction costs, qualification for 100 percent of the federal Production Tax Credits, [and] minimum annual production from the project."

The Wind Catcher project involved "acquisition of a 2,000-megawatt wind farm under construction in the Oklahoma Panhandle and construction of a 360-mile dedicated generation tie line to the Tulsa area, where the existing electrical grid ... [would] deliver the wind energy to customers."

The Wind Catcher Energy Connection project was approved by the Arkansas Public Service Commission and the Louisiana Public Service Commission in 2018.

== Existing wind power capacity ==
Arkansas is home to one wind energy company, LM Windpower, which builds wind turbine blades at a plant in Little Rock, and to 12 facilities involved in the wind energy industry, such as PPG Industries and ABB.

A 100-foot wind turbine near Prairie Grove was the only turbine in the state.

== Potential ==
It is estimated that Arkansas could install 9,200 MW of wind generation capacity based on 80 meter hub height turbines. This could potentially generate 26.906 TWh of electricity each year. In 2015 Arkansas used 46.346 TWh of electricity. Raising the hub height to 110 meters, though, vastly increases the potential to 180,978 MW, capable of generating over 555 TWh of electricity each year.

== See also ==
- Solar power in Arkansas
- Energy in Arkansas
- Wind power in the United States
- Renewable energy in the United States
