= Ozark–St. Francis National Forest =

United States National Forest located in the state of Arkansas

Ozark-St. Francis National Forest

- Location within the United States
- Location: Arkansas, U.S.
- Nearest city: Russellville, AR
- Coordinates: 35°16′30″N 94°28′32″W
- Area: 1,159,801 acres (4,693.55 km^{2})
- Established: March 6, 1908; 118 years ago
- Governing body: U.S. Forest Service
- Website: Ozark-St. Francis National Forests

The Ozark – St. Francis National Forest is a United States National Forest that is located in the state of Arkansas. It is composed of two separate forests, Ozark National Forest in the Ozark Mountains; and St. Francis National Forest on Crowley's Ridge. Each forest has distinct biological, topographical, and geological differences.

Together, the two forests are home to 23 developed campgrounds, and include nine swimming areas, 395 miles (636 km) of hiking trails, and 370 miles (600 km) of streams for fishing. The majority of the trails in what are now the Ozark National Forest and St. Francis National Forest were constructed under the Works Progress Administration (WPA) and Civilian Conservation Corps (CCC).

The Forest contains 11,000 acres (45 km^{2}) of old-growth forests. The old-growth forests typically occur in the southern portion of the Forest on ridges and steep south-facing slopes and are dominated by Shortleaf Pine and various oaks, including Post Oak, Blackjack Oak, Eastern Black Oak, White Oak, and Northern Red Oak. The Forest is also home to six different endangered species.

== Ozark National Forest ==
The Ozark National Forest encompasses 1,200,000 acres (4,856 km^{2}) primarily in the Ozark Mountains in northern Arkansas. The forest includes the highest point in Arkansas, Mount Magazine, and Blanchard Springs Caverns. The southern section of the forest lies along the Arkansas River Valley south to the Ouachita Mountains.

=== History ===
The movement toward forest conservation in the United States started formally at the federal level when President of the United States Benjamin Harrison withdrew 13 million acres (53,000 km^{2}) of public land in the Western United States from availability for settlement to the public domain in 1891, eventually becoming forest reserves, later renamed National Forests. As requests for establishment of similar reserves in the Southern and Eastern U.S. grew, Arkansas's sparsely settled forested regions still contained large areas of public domain. President Theodore Roosevelt withdrew this area from further homesteading in the summer of 1907 and signed a proclamation on December 8, 1907 establishing Arkansas National Forest in the hilly, forested region south of the Arkansas River. Ozark National Forest was created as the second National Forest in Arkansas on March 6, 1908 by proclamation of President Roosevelt. An influential resident, Harry E. Kelley of Fort Smith, Arkansas, saw protection of the forest as a perpetual source of wood for the nascent furniture industry in Fort Smith. A joint headquarters for both forests was initially opened in Fort Smith, but was moved to Harrison by December 1908.

=== Description ===
Ozark National Forest is located in parts of 16 counties. In descending order of forestland they are Newton, Pope, Johnson, Franklin, Crawford, Logan, Baxter, Stone, Madison, Yell, Van Buren, Searcy, Washington, Benton, Conway, and Marion counties. There are local ranger district offices located in Clarksville, Hector, Jasper, Mountain View, Ozark, and Paris.

The forest is home to over 500 species of trees and woody plants. Hardwoods, predominantly oak and hickory, comprise the majority of the forest. The forest contains five designated wilderness areas and several Wildlife Management Areas.

Several National Scenic Byways cross the Ozark National Forest, including the Scenic 7 Byway which runs from Missouri to Louisiana, 60 miles (100 km) of which are within the Ozark National Forest. Scenic 7 Byway offers the greatest variety of Ozark topography and scenic vistas. The Ozark Highlands Byway provides access to the Mulberry River, Big Piney Creek, and Buffalo National River for fishermen and canoeists. The Mount Magazine Byway offers scenic overlooks of the Arkansas River Valley, and the Sylamore Scenic Byway offers a scenic drive to the Blanchard Springs Caverns. Forest headquarters are located in Russellville, Arkansas.

The Ozark Highlands Trail, built and maintained by over 3,000 volunteers, is the longest hiking trail in the forest and extends for 165 miles (270 km) from the Buffalo National River to Lake Fort Smith State Park in the far western portion of the state. The forest also contains several multi-use trails including the Pedestal Rock Trail and the Alum Cove Natural Bridge Trail and a few wheelchair-accessible trails.

The trail into Devil’s Canyon Scenic Area is about 10 miles north of Mulberry on State Highway 215.

In addition to the hiking trails, the forest provides trails designated for horseback riding, canoeing, mountain biking, and all-terrain vehicles. The longest horse trail is the Sylamore Trail with a length of 80 miles (130 km). This trail passes over rocky bluffs, into deep hollows, and across mountain streams. The Huckleberry Mountain Horse Trail has a stop at the Sorghum Hollow Horse Camp which was built and maintained by local horsemen.

=== Districts ===
Haw Creek Falls

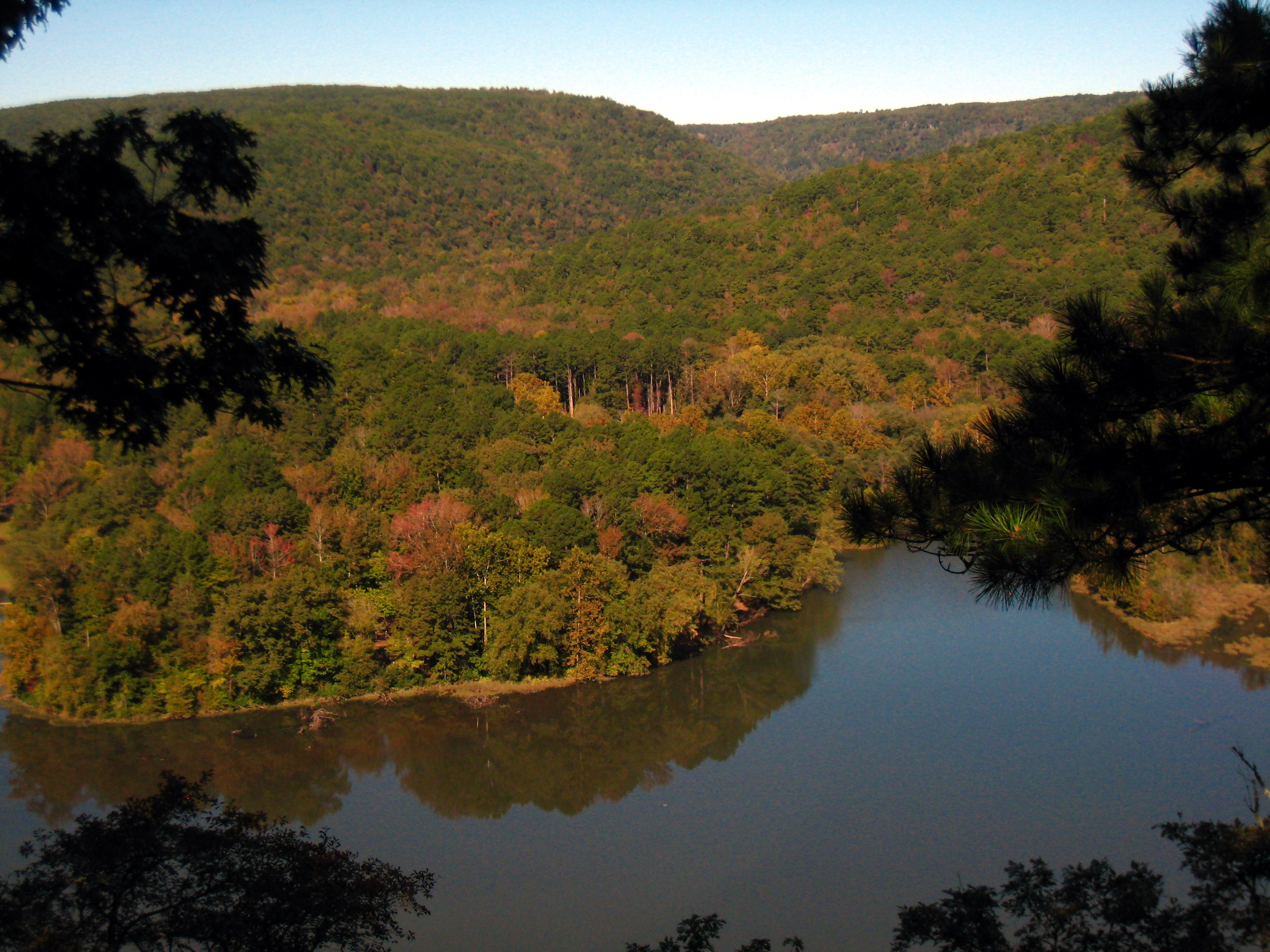
Shores Lake

The following are the six different ranger districts and some recreation areas or state parks within the Ozark National Forest:

- Pleasant Hill Ranger District

- Horsehead Lake Recreation Area
- Ozone Recreation Area
- Pleasant Hill Shooting Range
- Redding Campground
- Wolf Pen

- Mt. Magazine Ranger District

- Cove Lake Recreation Area
- Mount Magazine Complex
- Spring Lake

- Big Piney Ranger District

- Bayou Bluff
- Brock Creek
- Haw Creek Falls
- Long Pool Recreation Area
- Rotary Ann Roadside Rest Area

- Boston Mountain Ranger District

- Lake Wedington
- Natural Dam Picnic Area
- Gray's Spring
- Shores Lake Recreation Area (35°38′19″N 093°57′33″W) in Franklin County.
- Lake Fort Smith State Park
- White Rock Mountain

- Sylamore Ranger District

- Barkshed Campground
- Gunner Pool Campground
- Blanchard Springs Recreation Area and Campground
- Sylamore Shooting Range
- Syllamore Mountain Bike Trail
- Blanchard Springs Caverns

=== Special interest areas ===
Pedestal Rocks in Pope County

Sam's Throne as seen from top of Chicken Head Wall

Within National Forests, Special Interest Areas (SIAs) offer special geological, botanical, biological, zoological, scenic, or cultural features that are either distinctive enough to not be available across large parts of the forest, or are exemplary offerings of similar areas elsewhere in the forest. ONF has 21 SIAs, mostly designated on the basis of geological and scenic value.

- Alum Cove
- Blue hole
- Buzzard Roost
- City Rock Bluff
- Clifty Canyon
- Devils Canyon
- Devils Eyebrow
- Dismal Creek
- Eagles Gap
- Fern Gully
- Hare Mountain
- Jack’s Creek
- Mount Magazine
- North Twin
- Pedestal Rocks
- Penhook
- Sam's Throne
- Sandstone Hollow
- Stack Rocks
- Waldo/Wainscott
- White Rock

=== Wild and Scenic Rivers ===
The ONF contains six National Wild and Scenic Rivers with a total of 165 miles (266 km): the Buffalo River, Big Piney Creek, Hurricane Creek, Mulberry River, Richland Creek and North Sylamore Creek.

=== Wilderness areas ===
There are five officially designated wilderness areas lying within Ozark National Forest that are part of the National Wilderness Preservation System.

- East Fork Wilderness
- Hurricane Creek Wilderness
- Leatherwood Wilderness
- Richland Creek Wilderness
- Upper Buffalo Wilderness

== St. Francis National Forest ==
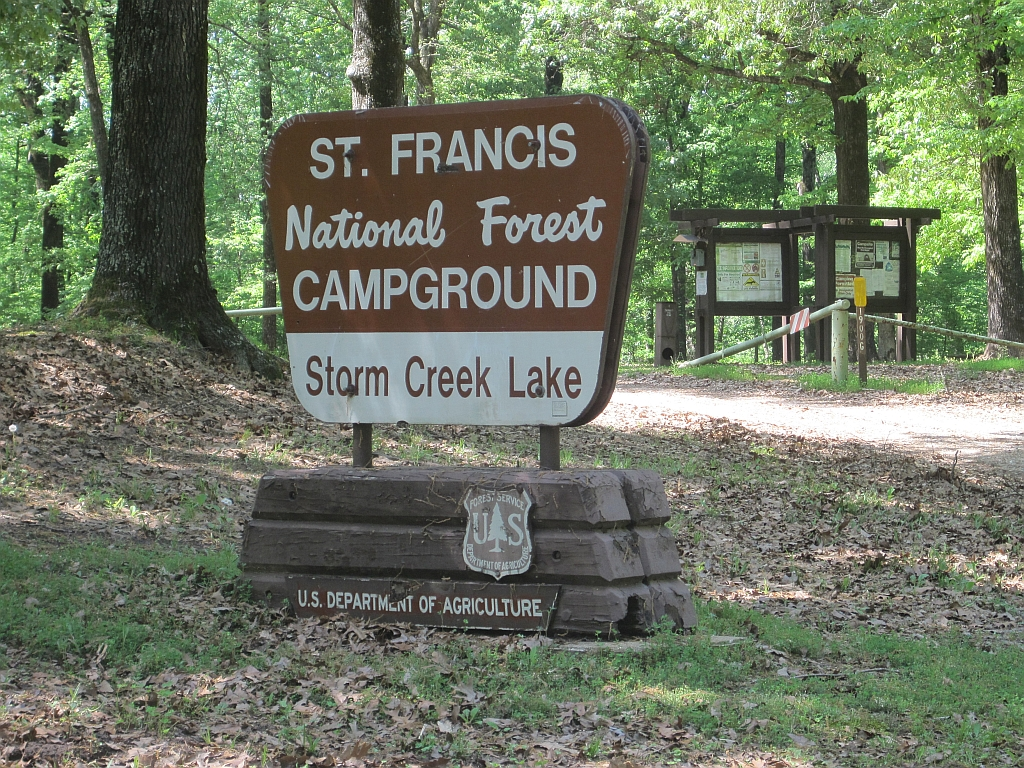

The St. Francis National Forest was established on November 8, 1960 by President Dwight D. Eisenhower. It covers 22,600 acres (91 km^{2}) in eastern Arkansas along the Mississippi River, in Lee and Phillips counties, and is one of the smallest national forests in the United States. There are local ranger district offices located in Marianna. The majority of the Forest is situated on Crowley's Ridge, but it extends into the low, flat lands along the Mississippi and St. Francis Rivers. St. Francis National Forest is the only place in the National Forest System where the public can enjoy the Mississippi River from the shoreline.

The small forest is contained within a single Ranger district, the St. Francis Ranger District. While lacking the broad range of recreational activity available in other national forests, St. Francis National Forest is known for its fishing. The two largest lakes, Bear Creek Reservoir and Storm Creek Lake, enjoy large populations of Largemouth bass, Crappie, Warmouth, and Channel catfish.

== See also ==
- List of national forests of the United States
- Ouachita National Forest
- Ozark Mountain forests
- Tom's Mill Fire
