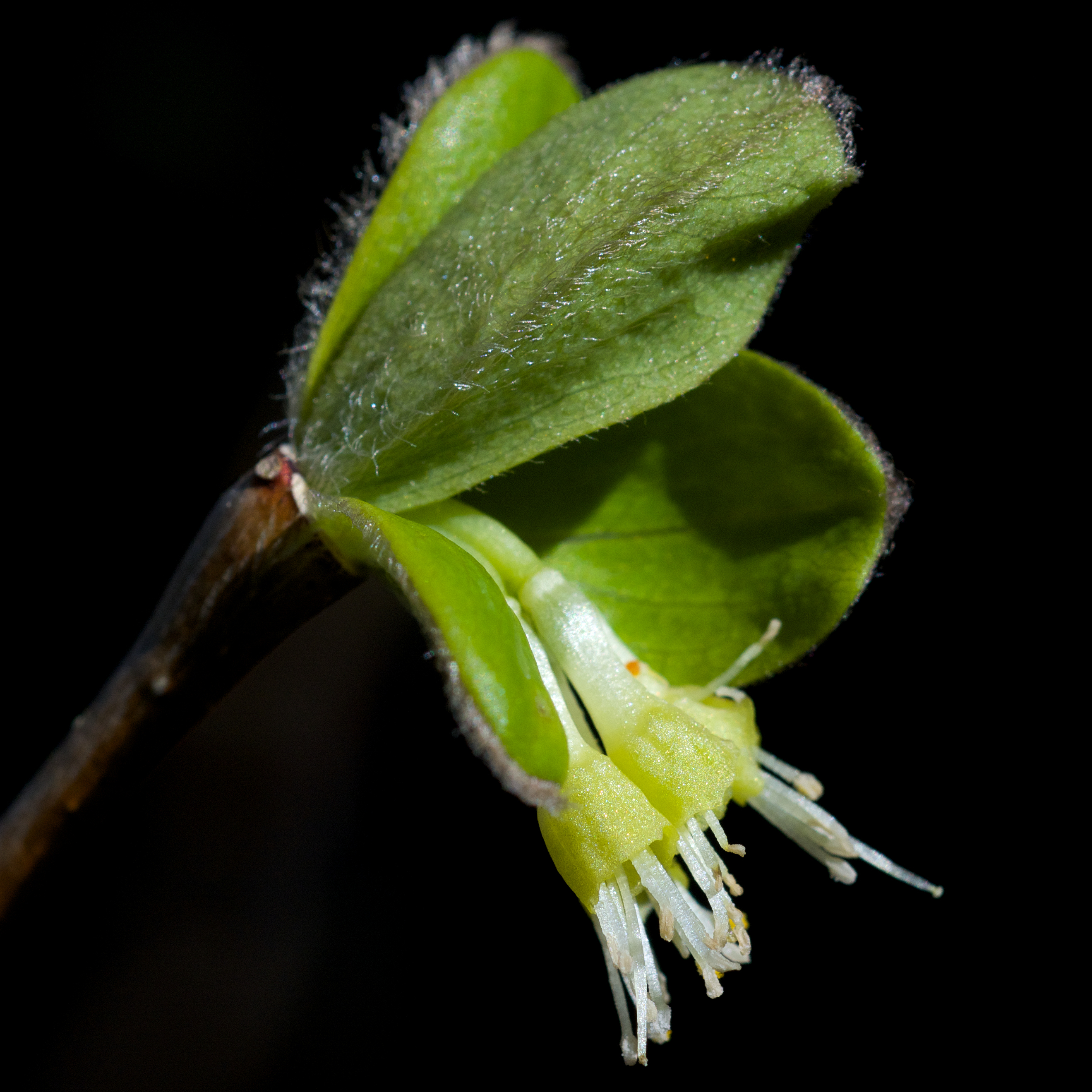
- Dirca palustris

Conservation status
- Apparently Secure (NatureServe)

Scientific classification
- Kingdom: Plantae
- Clade: Tracheophytes
- Clade: Angiosperms
- Clade: Eudicots
- Clade: Rosids
- Order: Malvales
- Family: Thymelaeaceae
- Genus: Dirca
- Species: D. palustris

Binomial name
- Dirca palustris L.

= Dirca palustris =

Eastern leatherwood

Species of flowering plant

Dirca palustris, or eastern leatherwood, is a flowering shrub in the family Thymelaeceae native to eastern North America. The name leatherwood refers to the toughness of its elastic and fibrous bark, which was used to make cordage by Native American tribes, and later, European settlers. Other common names include leatherbark, wicopee (or wicopy), rope-bark, moosewood, and bois de plomb in Canada.

The species epithet palustris means "of the marsh" in reference to the wet soils preferred by this species, though it may also occur in well-drained areas provided that the soils are moisture-retentive.

== Description ==
D. palustris is a widely branching, usually multi-stemmed woody shrub that reaches a vertical height of up to 3 m.

Leatherwood produces bisexual flowers, which contain both male (stamen) and female (pistil) reproductive organs. The pale, yellow, bell-shaped flowers consist of joined sepals without petals. They are born in axillary clusters of 2 to 7 flowers. There are 8 long stamens. The stalks of the flower clusters are 1/8–3/8 in (3–10 mm) long at flowering, elongating to about 1/4–1/2 in (6–13 mm) at fruiting time. The stalks of individual flowers are smooth and up to about 3/8 in (10 mm) long; sometimes 2 or more of these stalks are fused nearly to the tips. The flower buds are small and conical, with 4 distinct dark, silky bracts that persist after flowering. It blooms in late March–April, flowering before the leaves emerge. The flowers fall off when the leaves expand.

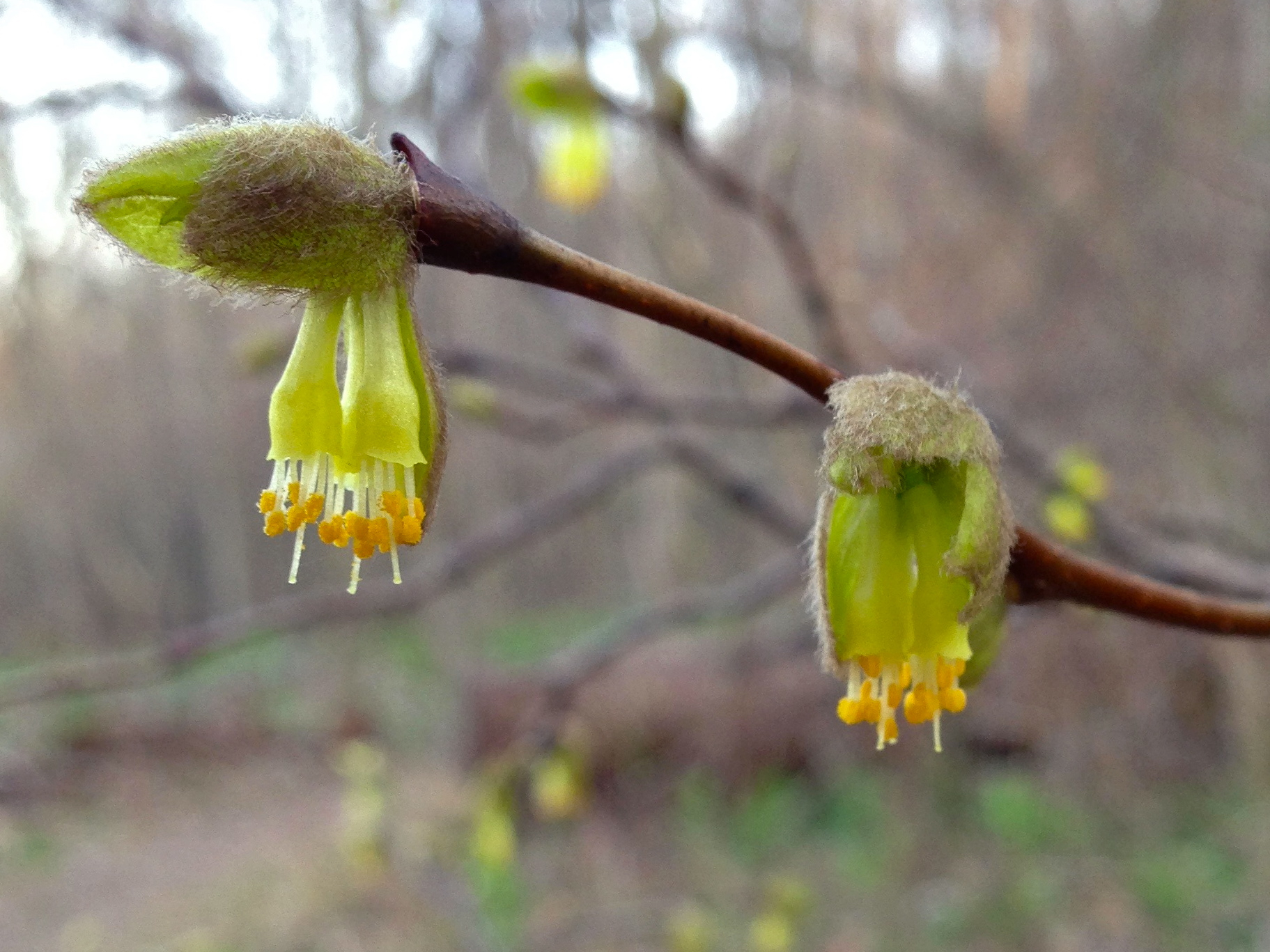
Flowers emerging in early Spring with notable silky bracts. In Fairfax County, Virginia.

Leatherwood fruits from May to June. The fruit is an oval to egg-shaped drupe, usually pale green or yellowish, sometimes strongly tinged with red or purple, often turning darker and redder with age. Each fruit bears a single, dark brown seed.

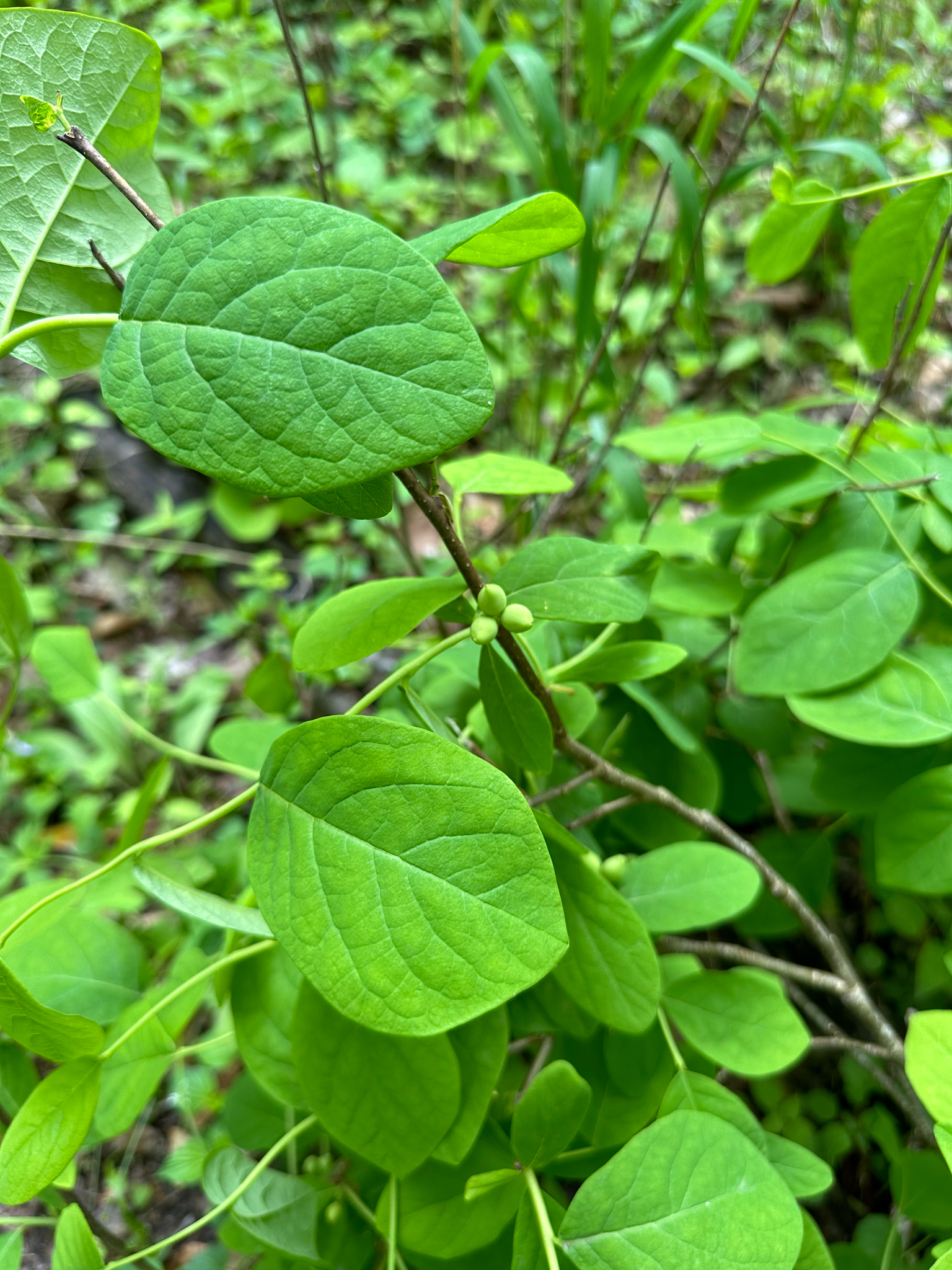
Cluster of three drupes. In Marne, Michigan.

The leaves are simple, alternately arranged, and 3.5–7 cm (1.4–2.8 in) long. The surface is hairy when immature, light green, becoming smooth as the leaf matures. The leaf stalks are short, hairy, and hollow. The next year's leaf buds are hidden and covered by the base of the leaf stalk.

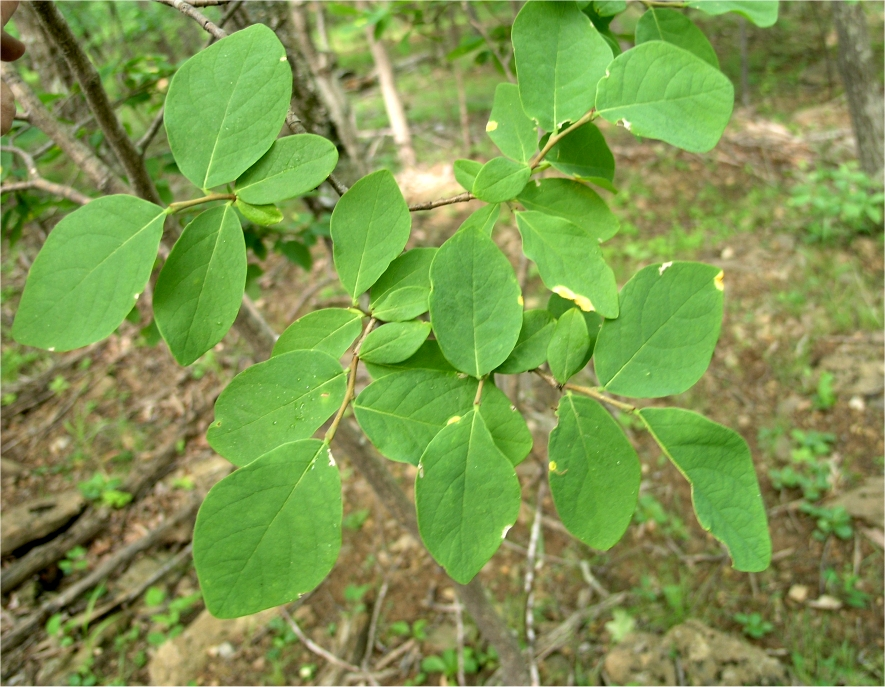
Branches and leaves. Near North Fork Mountain, West Virginia, USA

The bark is mostly smooth and gray on old stems and roughened at the base of old trunks, becoming very tough. The wood is soft, white, and brittle when dried.

The twigs are yellowish brown or reddish brown and smooth. The stems are ringed by circular scars at the beginning of the new growth. The twigs are very flexible and are capable of being bent or even tied into knots without breaking. They are enlarged at the joints.

D. palustris is a host plant of the leaf mining larvae of the moth species Leucanthiza dircella.

== Distribution and habitat ==
Its natural distribution extends from New Brunswick to Ontario in the north and from northern Florida to Louisiana in the south. Within this range, the distribution is restricted to very specific site conditions. As a result, the occurrence of the species is sporadic. It is found almost exclusively in mesic, relatively rich hardwood forests or mixed conifer-hardwood forests.

It is most likely to be encountered in the northern part of its range, and is a dominant shrub in some hardwood forests of the upper Great Lakes Region. Rich woods, swampy in some cases, provide its main habitat, and it is occasionally cultivated. It is often hard to recognize because the flowers, which come out just before leafing, last a very short time and D. palustris may be mixed in with the much more frequent Spicebush, which also has small yellow flowers that appear before the leaves and do so at just about the same time in the early spring. Its closest relative, the western leatherwood, lives across the continent in the San Francisco Bay Area.

== Taxonomy ==
"Dirca palustris, Dirca des marais". Watercolor by Pierre-Joseph Redouté originally published in Duhammel du Moncceau's 1806 Traité des arbres et arbustes que l'on cultive en France.

Existing scientific literature credits a plant collector named John Clayton with the first European discovery of the species in the 1730s when he sent dried specimens from the Virginia Colony to the Dutch botanist Jan Frederik Gronovius. Gronovius then sent some of the specimens he had received from Clayton to Carl Linnaeus in Sweden. In his 1751 dissertation, a student of Linnaeus named Leonhard Johan Chenon was the first to use the binomial Dirca palustris. While this accurately describes the assignment of the binomial name, Michel Sarrazin, the early Canadian field-naturalist, was the first to report on this species in 1700. Sarrazin had been a student of the French botanist Joseph Pitton de Tournefort, and once in North America, he began surveying the unnamed flora and fauna of the New World. In 1700, he wrote a letter to Tournefort describing the species. Sarrazin also sent living specimens of many species to France. A surviving catalog of these shipments confirms that D. palustris was transferred to the King's garden where it was initially misidentified as the tropical species known as princewood.

== Toxicity ==
The plant is known to be an emetic, laxative, and vesicant with some people developing severe skin irritation upon contact with the bark. The fruits are mildly poisonous to mammals.

Eight novel organic sulfur compounds, named dirchromones, have been isolated from dichloromethane extracts of the roots, bark, and wood. These compounds, the first sulfur-containing compounds to be identified in the family Thymelaceae, were found to have cytotoxic and mild antibacterial effects.
