= Cove Creek Bridge =

Cove Creek Bridge may refer to:

- Cove Creek Bridge (Corley, Arkansas), listed on the NRHP in Arkansas
- Cove Creek Bridge (Martinville, Arkansas), listed on the NRHP in Arkansas
- Cove Creek Tributary Bridge, Corley, Arkansas, listed on the NRHP in Arkansas
