= Arkansas Highway 309 =

State highway in Arkansas, United States

Highway 309
- Mount Magazine Scenic Byway

Route information
- Maintained by ArDOT

Section 1
- Length: 5.11 mi (8.22 km)
- West end: CR 28 at Blue Mountain Lake
- East end: AR 10 at Waveland

Section 2
- Length: 42.90 mi (69.04 km)
- West end: AR 10 at Havana
- East end: AR 23 at Webb City

Location
- Country: United States
- State: Arkansas
- Counties: Yell, Logan, Franklin

Highway system
- Arkansas Highway System; Interstate; US; State; Business; Spurs; Suffixed; Scenic; Heritage
← AR 308	→ AR 310

Arkansas Highway 309 (AR 309 and Hwy. 309) is a designation for two state highways in Western Arkansas. One route of 5.11 miles (8.22 km) runs from Yell County Route 28 (CR 28) at Blue Mountain Lake northeast to Highway 10 at Waveland. A second segment begins at Highway 10 in Havana and winds northwest through the Ozark National Forest to Highway 23 at Webb City via Paris. A portion of the second route is designated as the Mount Magazine Scenic Byway, one of eleven Arkansas Scenic Byways maintained by the Arkansas State Highway and Transportation Department (AHTD).

== Route description ==
=== Blue Mountain Lake to Waveland ===
Highway 309 begins at Yell County Route 28 near Blue Mountain Lake in Yell County. The route runs east and turns north to terminate at Highway 10. This alignment does not cross any other state highways. An average daily vehicle count from 2010 indicated that 630 vehicles per day use this segment of Highway 309.

=== Havana to Webb City ===
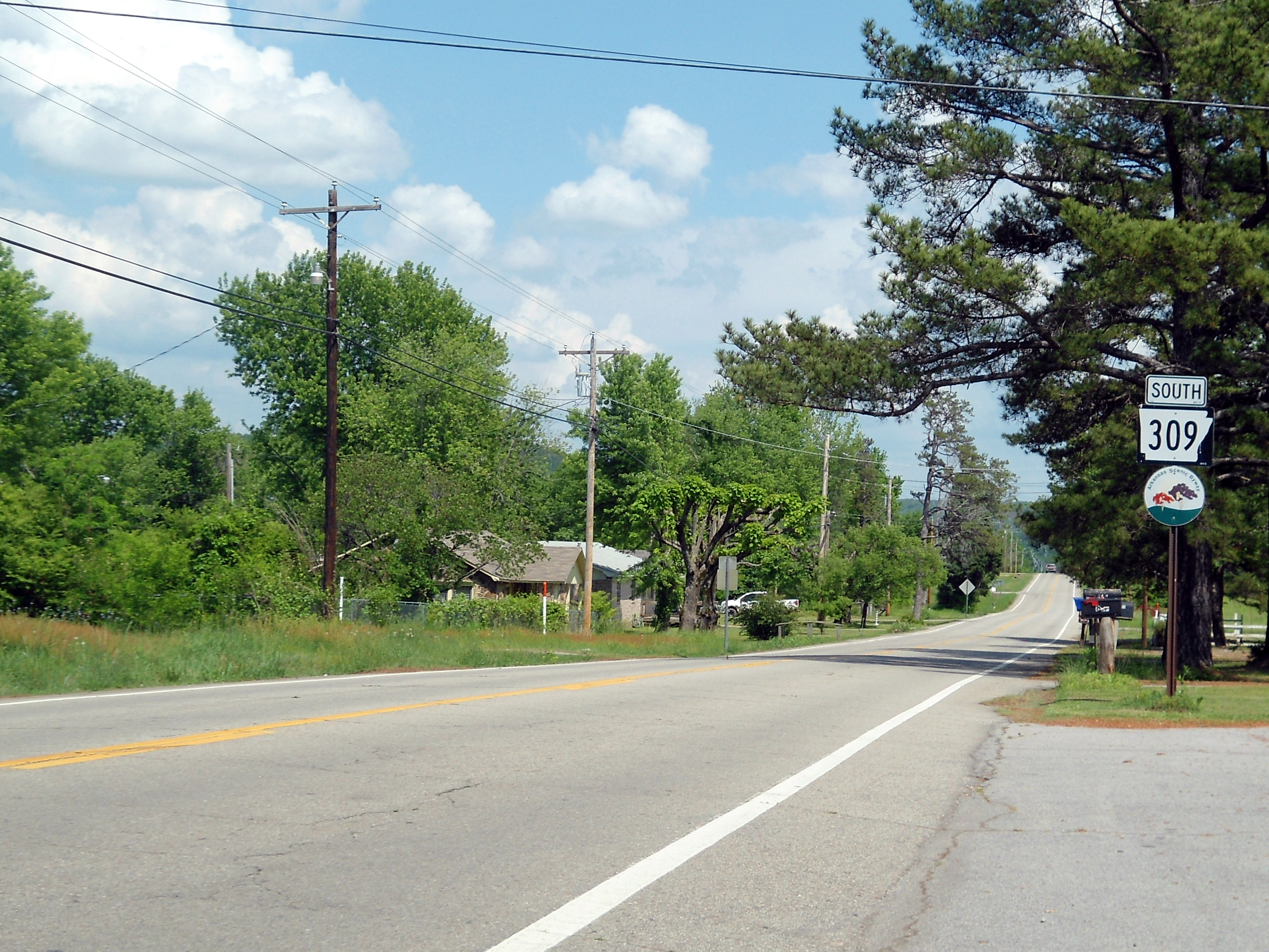
Highway 309 at Webb City

A second, longer routing of Highway 309 begins in Havana at Highway 10. The route begins north through the Ozark National Forest. The route runs near the Cove Creek Bridge, Burnett Springs, and the Cove Lake Bathhouse and Cove Lake Spillway Dam-Bridge near Cove Lake. The highway also passes over the Cove Creek Tributary Bridge prior to exiting the forest northbound to Paris. Along this route lies the small town of Roseville. According to local folklore Roseville missed out on being the capital of Arkansas by only one vote. Whither this is true or not has never been proven, but this story has been passed down from generation to generation and survives til this day.

Upon entering the northern county seat of Logan County Highway 309 forms a concurrency with Highway 109 in south Paris, continuing north to Highway 22. This junction also contains Logan County Courthouse and the Paris Commercial Historic District on the National Register of Historic Places. Highway 309 continues north past the Methodist Episcopal Church, and Paris Post Office to exit town heading north. The route runs north, briefly along the Arkansas River before it enters Franklin County. The route runs almost due north to Webb City, where it terminates at Highway 23.

=== Mount Magazine Scenic Byway ===
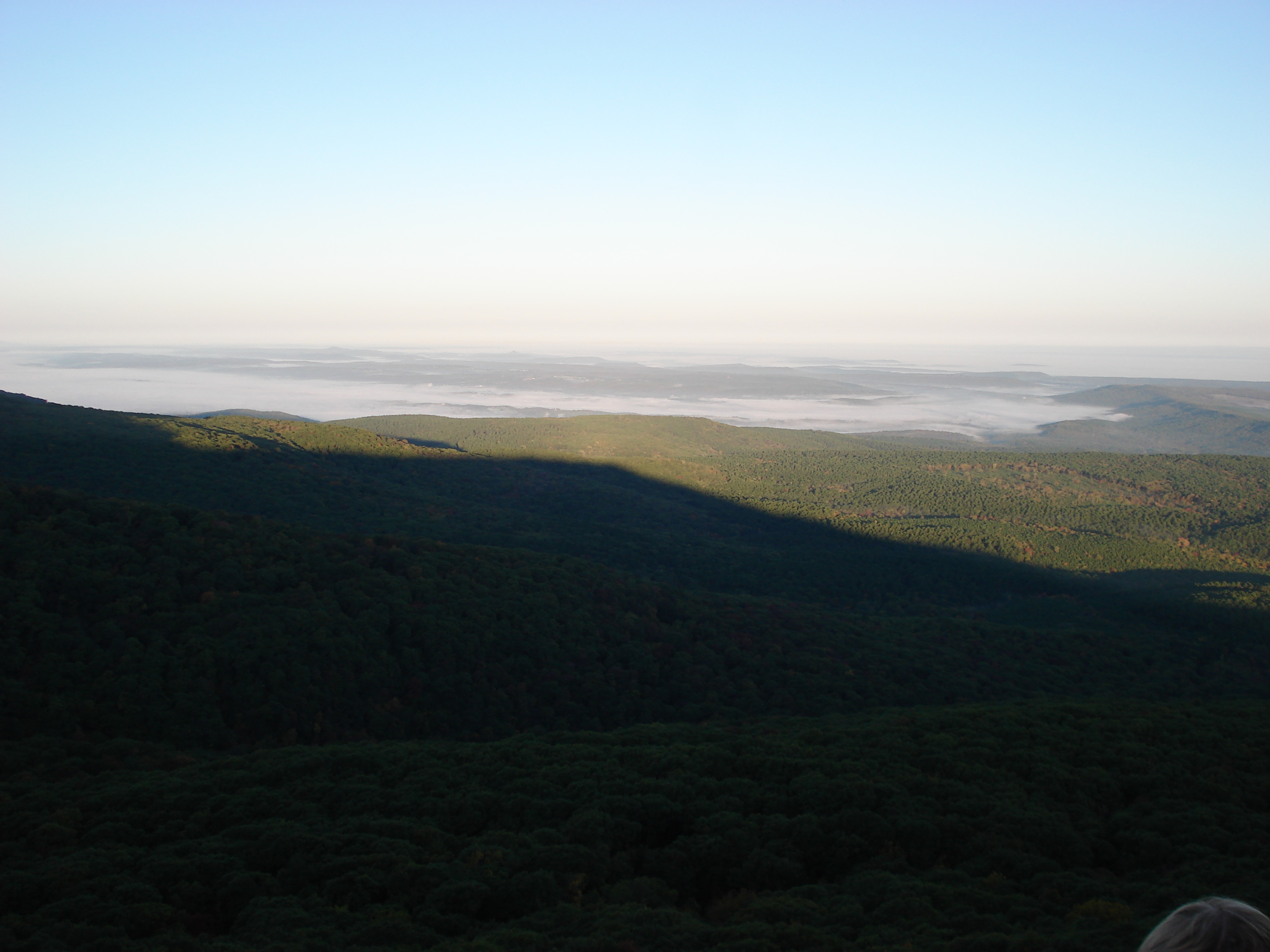
View facing northeast from atop Mount Magazine.

A segment of 20.4 miles (32.8 km) winds from Havana north through the Ozark National Forest to an area south of Paris. The route passes by Mount Magazine, which at 2,753 feet (839 m) is Arkansas's highest point. Recreation areas include Cove Lake and Mt. Magazine Recreation Areas, with views of Blue Mountain Lake available from an overlook. Many current camp sites are former home sites that were bought by the government during the depression.

== Major intersections ==
Mile markers reset at concurrencies.

County	Location	mi	km	Destinations	Notes
Yell	Blue Mountain Lake	0.00	0.00	CR 28	Western terminus
Yell	Waveland	5.11	8.22	AR 10 – Booneville, Danville	Eastern terminus
Yell	Gap in route				
Yell	Havana	0.00	0.00	AR 10 – Danville, Booneville	Western terminus
Logan	Paris	26.93	43.34	AR 109 – Magazine	
Logan	Paris	AR 109 concurrency north, 1.0 mile (1.6 km)			
Logan	Paris	0.00	0.00	AR 22 – Charleston, Fort Smith	
Logan	Roseville	7.43	11.96	AR 288 west	
Franklin	Webb City	15.97	25.70	AR 23 – Caulksville, Ozark	Eastern terminus
1.000 mi = 1.609 km; 1.000 km = 0.621 mi: Concurrency terminus

== Former route ==
Highway 309
- Location: Ozark
- Length: 1.84 mi (2.96 km)
- Existed: March 26, 1975–September 25, 1991

Highway 309 (AR 309, Ark. 309, and Hwy. 309) is a former route in Ozark. The route of 1.84 miles (2.96 km) began at Highway 23 and ran east to Highway 219. It was redesignated as Highway 96 in 1991 due to traveler confusion with the existing section of Highway 309.

=== History ===
Highway 309 was first added to the state highway system as a 0.5 miles (0.80 km) access road to the Ozark Municipal Airport by the Arkansas State Highway Commission on March 26, 1975. The Commission requested a study regarding extending the route east to Highway 219 on July 31, 1975, and requested an update to that study on March 22, 1978. Although the Commission requested the study's findings be reported at a later meeting, no record of the report's findings exist in subsequent meeting minutes between 1978 and June 1, 1991, when the Commission authorized the extension to Highway 219. Three months later, the Commission redesignated the highway as Highway 96 due to confusion between the two eastbound routes with junctions on Highway 23 within a few miles of each other.

=== Major intersections ===
The entire route was in Ozark, Franklin County.

mi	km	Destinations	Notes
0.00	0.00	AR 23 (18th St)	Southern terminus
1.84	2.96	AR 219 (3rd St)	Northern terminus
1.000 mi = 1.609 km; 1.000 km = 0.621 mi

== See also ==
- List of state highways in Arkansas
- Arkansas Scenic Byways
- Mount Magazine State Park
