= U.S. Interior Highlands =

Mountainous region in the Central United States

- Highland
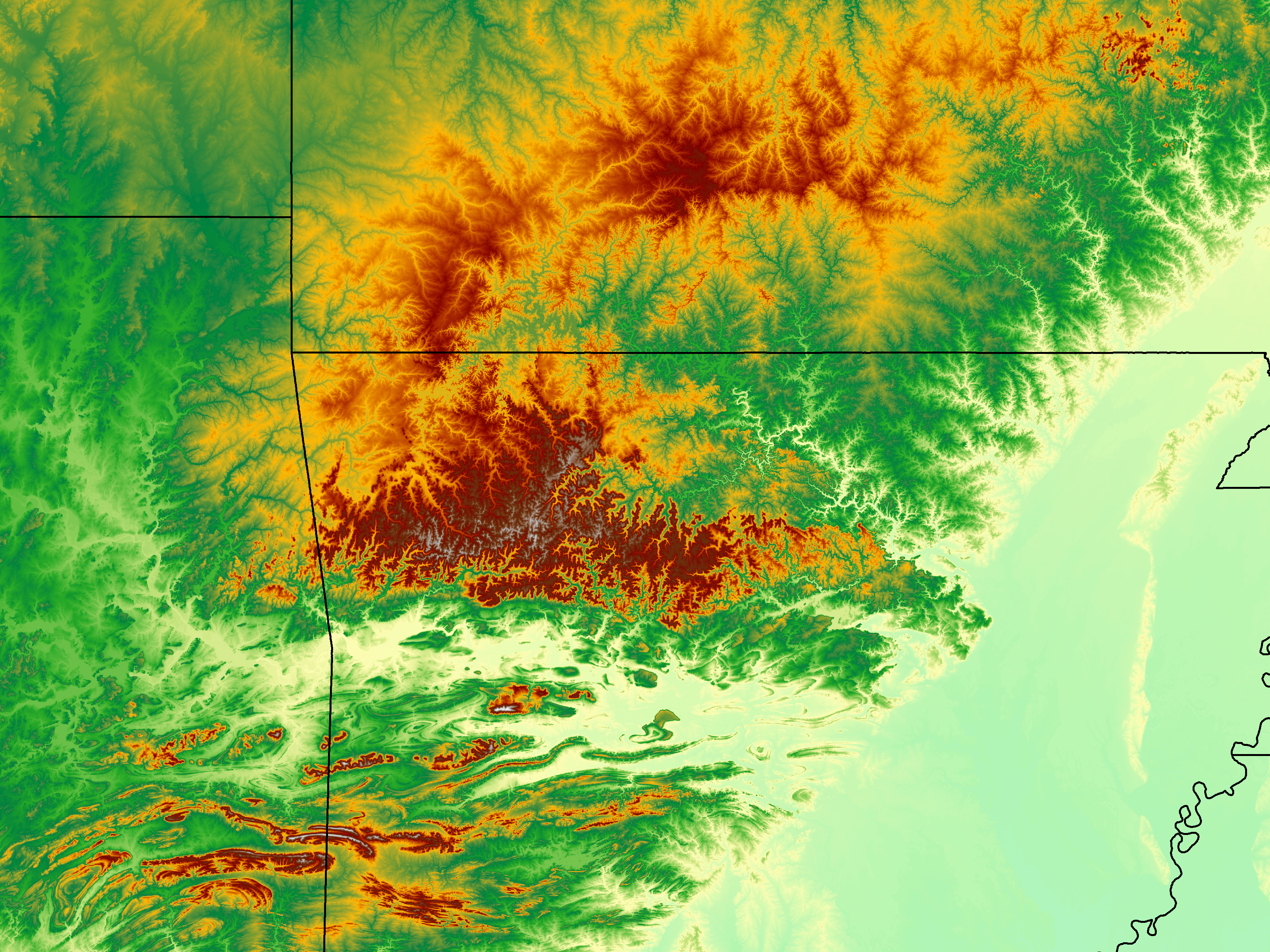
- 1:1000000 scale digital elevation model (DEM) of the U.S. Interior Highlands
- Interactive map of U.S. Interior Highlands
- Location: United States
- Highest elevation: 2,753 ft (839 m) (Mount Magazine)

The U.S. Interior Highlands is a mountainous region in the Central United States spanning northern and western Arkansas, southern Missouri, eastern Oklahoma, and southern Illinois. The name is designated by the United States Geological Survey to refer to the combined subregions of the Ouachita Mountains south of the Arkansas River and the Ozark Plateaus north of the Arkansas. The U.S. Interior Highlands is one of few mountainous regions between the Appalachians and Rockies.

== Geography ==
There are three distinct mountain ranges within the U.S. Interior Highlands:

- The Ouachita Mountains of Arkansas and Oklahoma, which can be divided into a number of subranges including the mountains of the Arkansas River Valley (called the Frontal Ouachita Mountains); the highest point is Mount Magazine at 2,753 ft (839 m).
- The Boston Mountains of the Arkansas and Oklahoma Ozark Plateaus; the highest point is Wahzhazhe Summit (formerly known as Buffalo Lookout), at 2,561 feet (781 m), 3.4 miles (5.5 km) east of Pettigrew, Newton County, Arkansas. Wahzhazhe is the Osage people’s name for themselves in the Dhegiha language.
- The St. Francois Mountains of the Missouri Ozark Plateaus; the highest point is Taum Sauk Mountain at 1,772 ft (540 m).

The U.S. Interior Highlands is dominated by temperate broadleaf and mixed forests. Three national forests are located here: The Ouachita National Forest in Arkansas and Oklahoma; the Ozark-St. Francis National Forest in Arkansas; and the Mark Twain National Forest in Missouri.

== Gallery ==
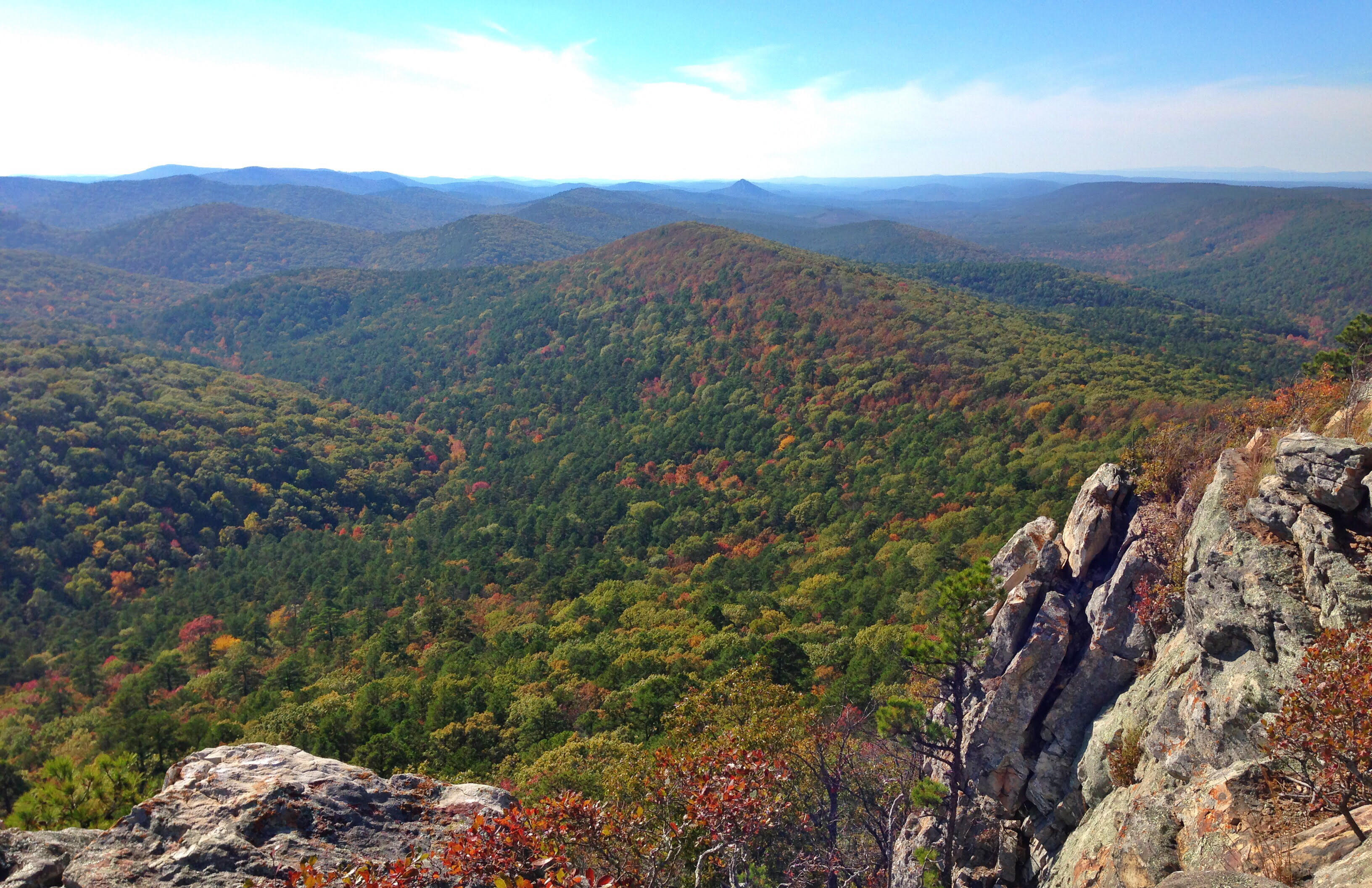
The Ouachita Mountains from Flatside Pinnacle (November 2013)

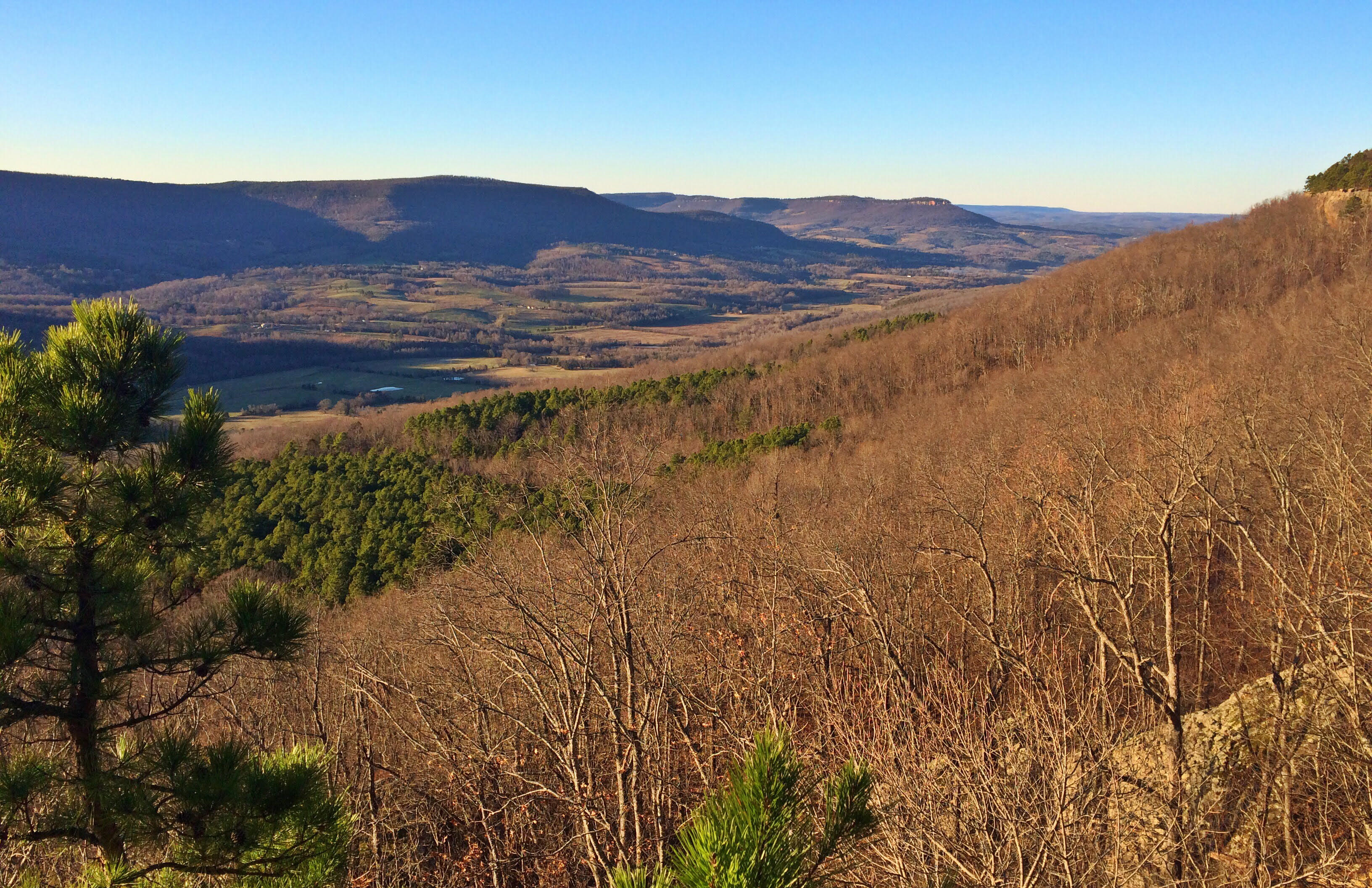
The Boston Mountains from Sam's Throne (December 2015)

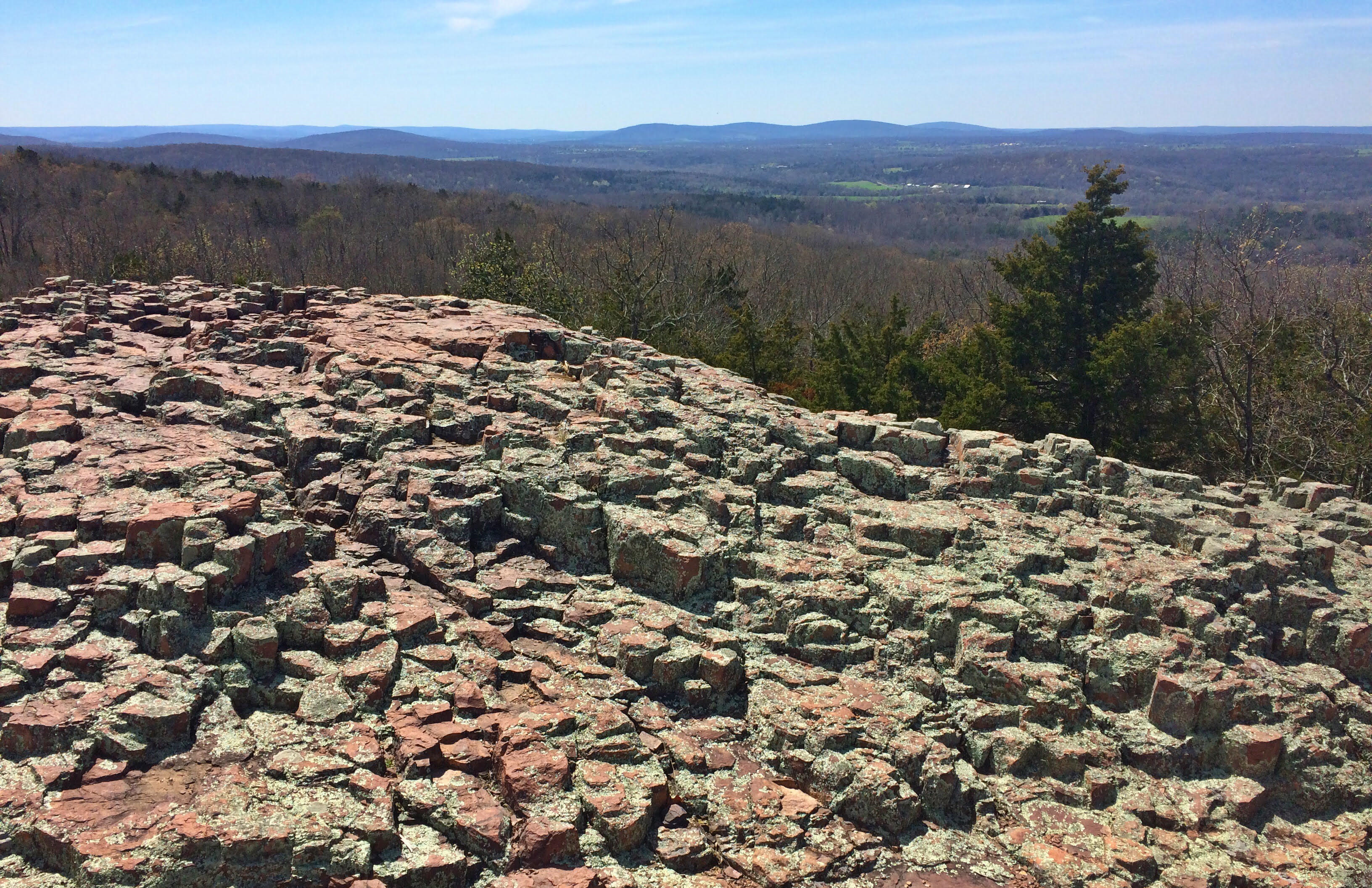
The St. Francois Mountains from Hughes Mountain (April 2017)

== See also ==
- Upland South
