= Blue Mountain Lake =

Blue Mountain Lake may refer to:

- Blue Mountain Lake (Arkansas), a reservoir in Arkansas
- Blue Mountain Lake (New York lake), a lake in Hamilton County in the central Adirondacks, New York
- Blue Mountain Lake (hamlet), New York, a hamlet in the Town of Indian Lake, Hamilton County, New York
