= Corley, Arkansas =

Unincorporated community in Arkansas, US

Coordinates: 35°12′48″N 93°38′05″W

Corley is an unincorporated community in Logan County, Arkansas, United States. It is the location of (or is the nearest community to) Burnett Springs, which is located at the end of County Road 704, Cove Creek Bridge, on AR 309 over Cove Creek, Cove Creek Tributary Bridge, on AR 309 over a tributary of Cove Creek, Cove Lake Bathhouse, located on Forest Service Rd. 1608A in the Ozark-St. Francis National Forest and Cove Lake Spillway Dam-Bridge located on AR 309 in the Ozark-St. Francis National Forest. All five of these places are listed on the National Register of Historic Places.
