= Mount Magazine =

Highest point in Arkansas, United States

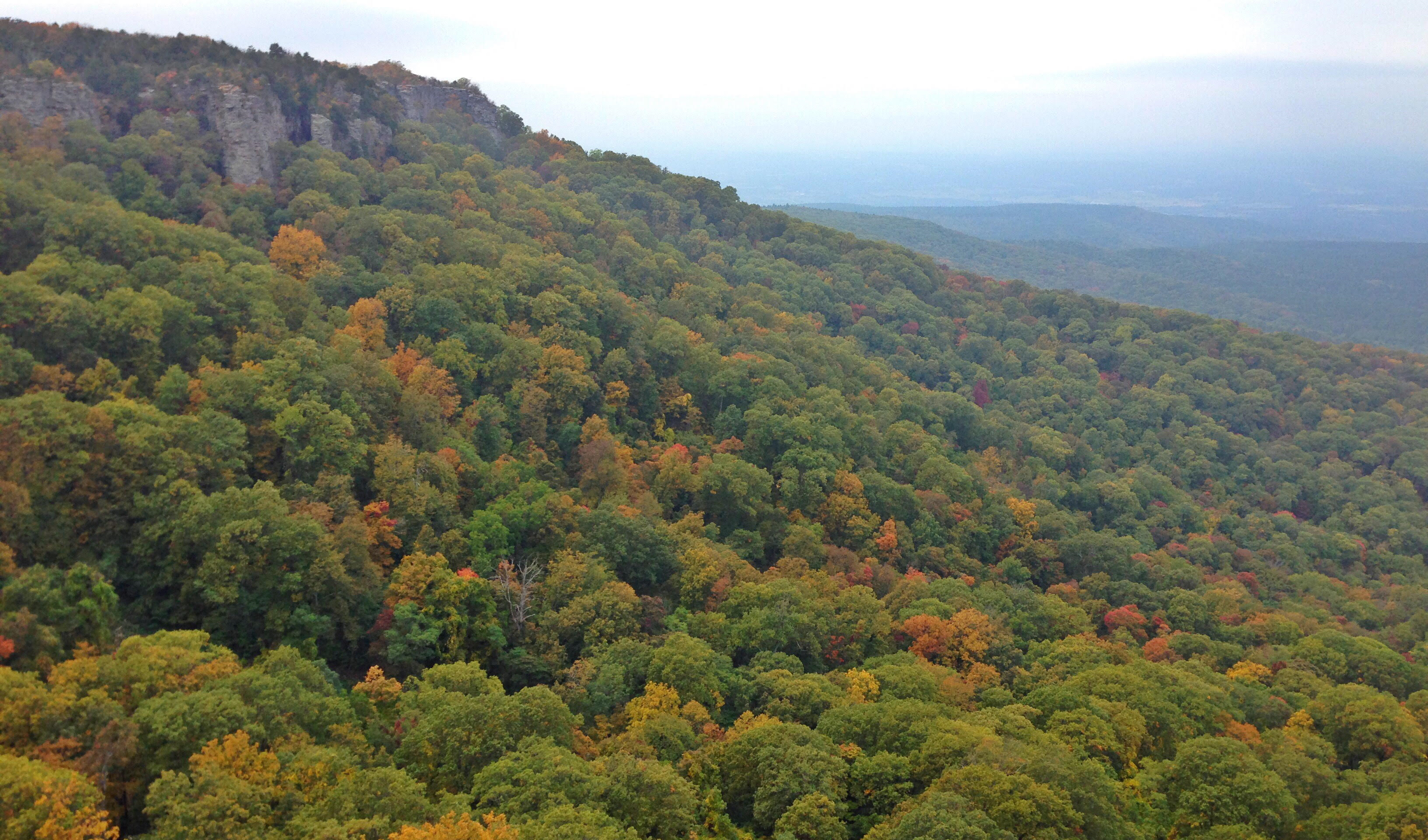
- Looking west from Mount Magazine's Cameron Bluff (October 2013)

Highest point
- Elevation: 2,753 ft (839 m) NAVD 88
- Prominence: 2,143 ft (653 m)
- Listing: Most isolated major summits of the United States (11th); Most isolated major summits of North America (23rd); U.S. states by elevation (34th)
- Coordinates: 35°10′01″N 93°38′41″W

Geography
- Location within Arkansas
- Location: Logan County, Arkansas, U.S.
- Parent range: Ouachita Mountains, U.S. Interior Highlands
- Topo map: USGS Blue Mountain

Climbing
- Easiest route: Paved road

Mount Magazine, officially named Magazine Mountain, is the highest point of the U.S. Interior Highlands and the U.S. state of Arkansas, and is the site of Mount Magazine State Park. It is a flat-topped mountain or mesa capped by hard rock and rimmed by precipitous cliffs. There are two summits atop the mountain: Signal Hill, which reaches 2,753 ft (839 m) and Mossback Ridge, which reaches 2,700 ft (823 m).

Mount Magazine is often called "the highest point between the Alleghenies and the Rockies" (there are mountains located in the Trans-Pecos region of far-west Texas which exceed Mount Magazine in elevation and prominence, although the Trans-Pecos region lies so far south of the Rockies, that region arguably lies not "between" the Allegheny Mountains and the Rocky Mountains). However, there are higher points in Kentucky, Tennessee, North Dakota, South Dakota, Oklahoma, Kansas, and Nebraska. The mountain is the tallest point in the vertical stretch between the Minnesota/Canada border and the Gulf of Mexico.

== Etymology ==
According to English botanist Thomas Nuttall, writing in 1819, French hunters named the mountain "Magazine" or "Barn" (French magasin) because of its "peculiar form". However, today some scholars believe Nuttall may have been writing about nearby Mount Nebo, and what is today called Mount Magazine was labeled "Castete Mt" on Nuttall's maps.

== Location ==
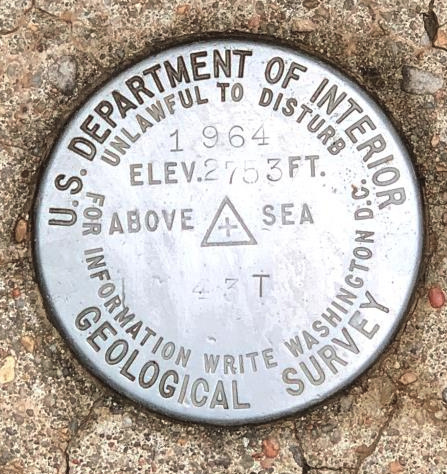
The U.S. Geological Survey elevation marker atop Mount Magazine.

Mount Magazine is located due north of Blue Mountain Lake in Logan County, Arkansas, approximately 45 mi (72 km) east of the Arkansas-Oklahoma border. The most scenic route to the top is a 10 mi (16 km) drive along Highway 309 (also known as the Mount Magazine Scenic Byway) from Havana.

Physiographically, Mount Magazine is part of the Frontal Ouachita Mountains, and is part of the Arkansas River Valley ecoregion. It lies within a southern extension of the Ozark National Forest close to the Ouachita National Forest.

== Climate ==
The climate is very different from the typical climate of Arkansas state as temperatures remain 10 degrees cooler than normal temperatures in the valleys. The annual average temperature is 56 °F. The park gets 54 inches of rainfall every year, and due to the low clouds, there is fog and limited visibility all year for eight days each month.

=== Summer ===
The summer temperature very rarely reaches 100 degrees Fahrenheit on the mountaintop and the hottest average temperature during the summer in the park is 90 degrees Fahrenheit.

=== Winter ===
The mountain has limited forest due to the harsh weather during the wintertime. Normal conditions like frost, sleet, hail, snow, and freezing rain can cause the limbs of trees to snap. Higher up on the mountain, frost flowers, ice crystals, hoarfrost, rime ice, and freezing fog can occur.

Climate data for Mount Magazine, 1948–1966 normals and extremes
Month	Jan	Feb	Mar	Apr	May	Jun	Jul	Aug	Sep	Oct	Nov	Dec	Year
Record high °F (°C)	76 (24)	71 (22)	80 (27)	89 (32)	94 (34)	100 (38)	104 (40)	105 (41)	98 (37)	92 (33)	78 (26)	76 (24)	105 (41)
Mean daily maximum °F (°C)	44.8 (7.1)	48.6 (9.2)	54.1 (12.3)	66.6 (19.2)	74.1 (23.4)	82.3 (27.9)	85.3 (29.6)	84.9 (29.4)	78.9 (26.1)	68.8 (20.4)	55.2 (12.9)	47.5 (8.6)	65.9 (18.8)
Mean daily minimum °F (°C)	27.3 (−2.6)	30.1 (−1.1)	34.7 (1.5)	46.7 (8.2)	56.7 (13.7)	63.9 (17.7)	66.9 (19.4)	66.4 (19.1)	59.8 (15.4)	50.5 (10.3)	37.5 (3.1)	30.8 (−0.7)	47.6 (8.7)
Record low °F (°C)	−9 (−23)	−7 (−22)	2 (−17)	21 (−6)	28 (−2)	43 (6)	53 (12)	51 (11)	39 (4)	21 (−6)	0 (−18)	−5 (−21)	−9 (−23)
Average precipitation inches (mm)	3.94 (100)	4.06 (103)	5.38 (137)	5.74 (146)	6.24 (158)	4.53 (115)	6.25 (159)	4.41 (112)	3.85 (98)	3.49 (89)	3.47 (88)	2.56 (65)	53.92 (1,370)
Average snowfall inches (cm)	2.2 (5.6)	2.5 (6.4)	0.7 (1.8)	0 (0)	0 (0)	0 (0)	0 (0)	0 (0)	0 (0)	0 (0)	0.7 (1.8)	0.7 (1.8)	6.8 (17.4)
Source: Western Regional Climate Center

== Geology ==
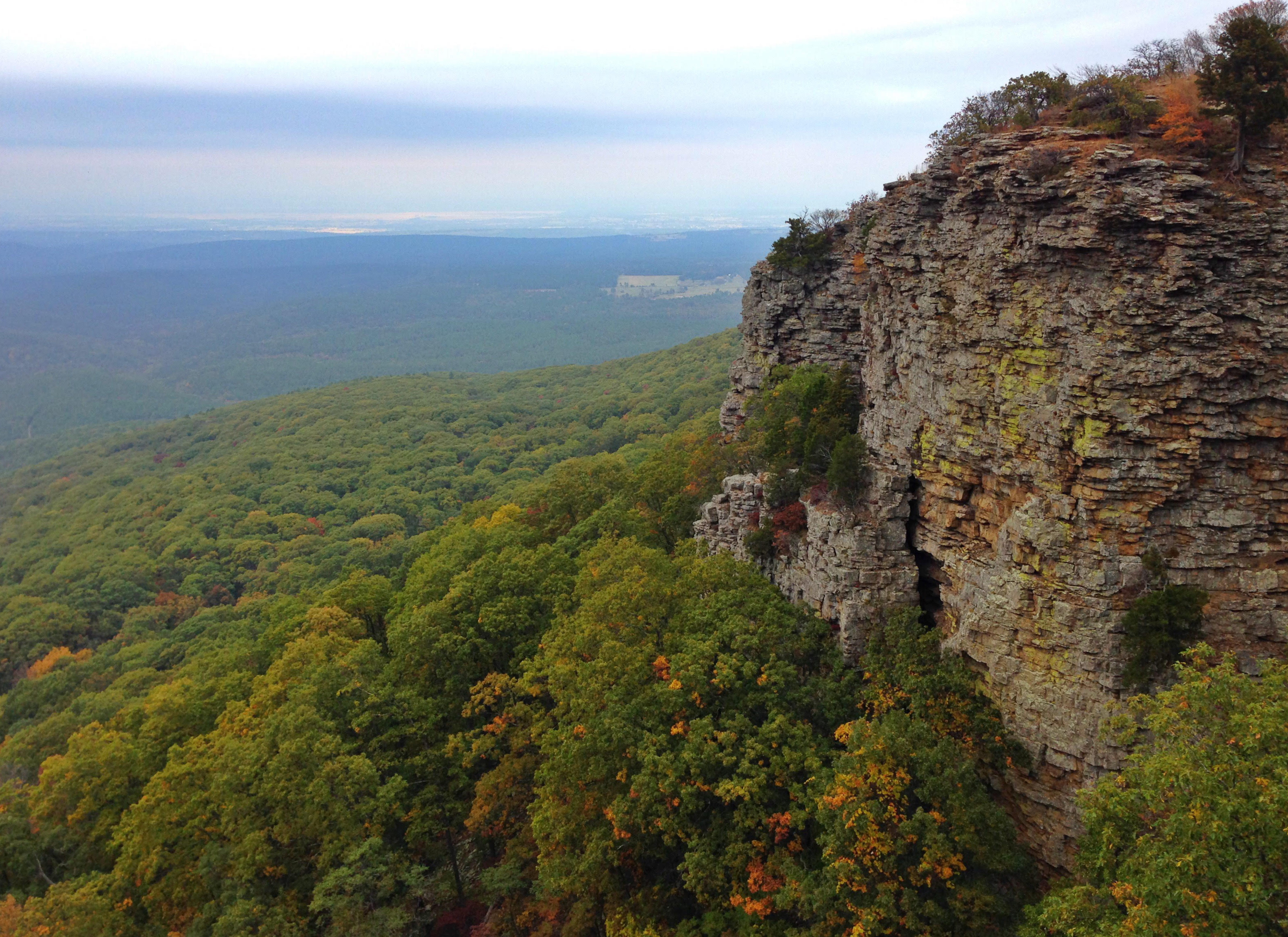
Looking north from Mount Magazine's Cameron Bluff, October 2013

As the South American plate collided with the North American plate during the late Paleozoic, a major foreland basin, the Arkoma Basin, developed north of the Ouachita Mountains. Small grains of sediment that had filled the Arkoma Basin were compacted and cemented into sedimentary rock. As the land rose above sea level, small streams developed that eventually merged into the Arkansas River. After millions of years of erosion, synclines like Mount Magazine have become the most positive topographic features; this phenomenon is the result of the rapid weathering of shales once sandstones were breached on the flanks of surrounding anticlines.

Mount Magazine is a broad mesa composed of Pennsylvanian sedimentary rocks deposited in various shallow-water environments. Like many mountains in the western Arkansas River Valley, Mount Magazine is capped by the Savanna Formation, a sequence of shale, siltstone, and sandstone; the upper portion of this sequence is missing throughout most of Arkansas. The Savanna Formation is conformable with the underlying McAlester Formation, a sequence of shale, siltstone, sandstone, and several coal beds. The McAlester Formation is conformable with the underlying Hartshorne Sandstone, a prominent ledge-former under favorable structural conditions. The Hartshorne Sandstone is unconformable with the underlying Atoka Formation. This unit has the largest areal extent of any of the Paleozoic formations in Arkansas, extending as far north as the Boston Mountains, and is divided into upper, middle, and lower members.

== Nature and attractions ==
Mount Magazine promotes environmental conservation as well as offering several nature activities. It also consists of 18 campsites. An annual butterfly festival used to be hosted at the park but has since been held each June in the Paris town square.

=== Animals ===
The park is home to many species including the white-tailed deer, gray squirrel, coyote, shagreen snail, black bear, rufous-crowned sparrows (rare), and 94 of the 134 butterfly species of Arkansas. The rarest butterfly species is the Diana fritillary. The park is home to around 100 bird species.

=== Activities ===
Activities include the following: hiking, biking, bird watching, horseback riding, hang gliding, rappelling, rock climbing, sightseeing, and photography. ATV riding is also allowed as there is a guide to the activity.

== See also ==
- List of mountains of Arkansas
- List of U.S. states by elevation
