= Arkansas River Valley =

- Region
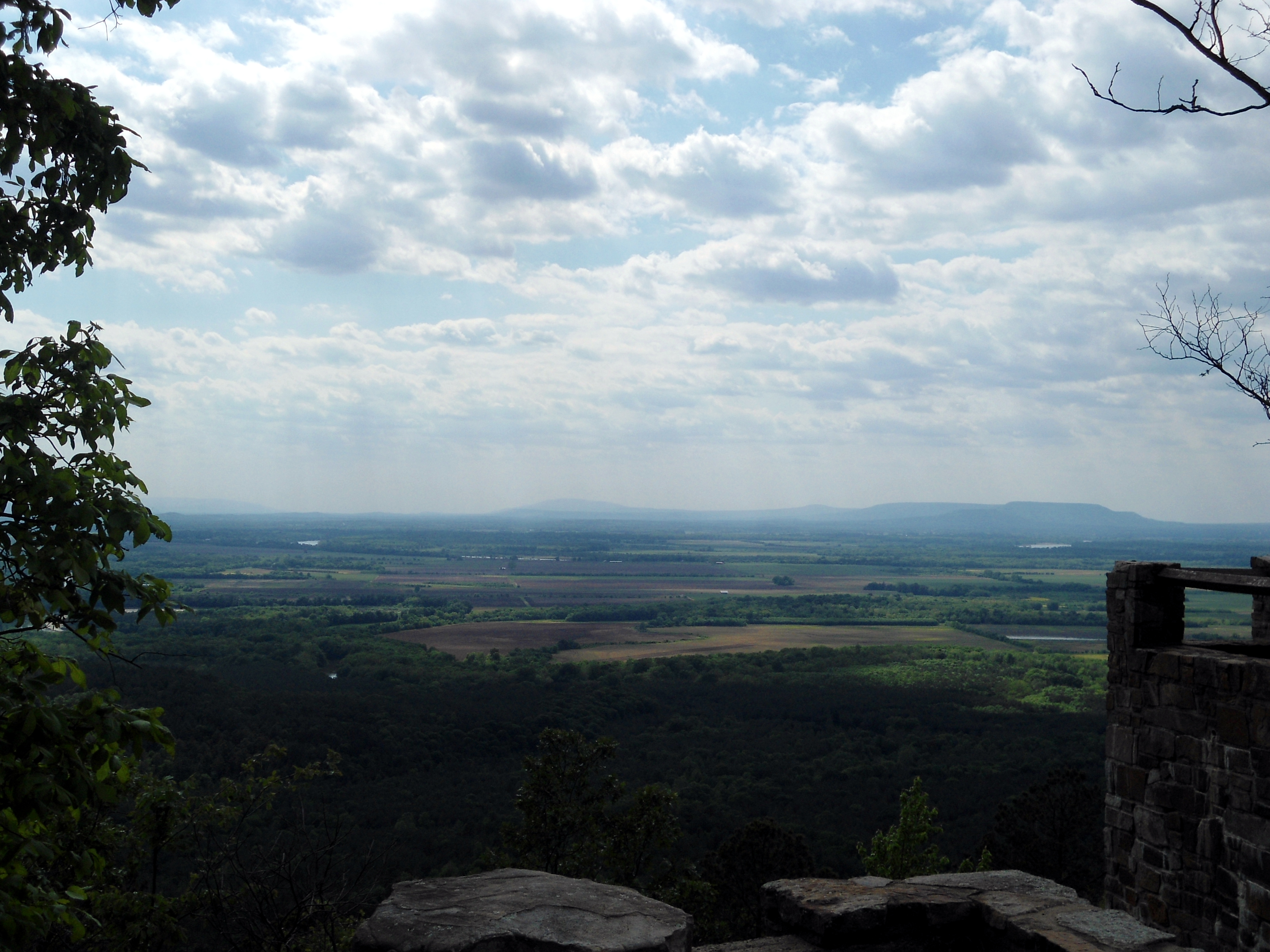
- The River Valley as seen from atop Petit Jean Mountain in Petit Jean State Park
- Etymology: The Arkansas River
- Interactive map of Arkansas River Valley
- Country: United States
- State: Arkansas
- Time zone: UTC−6 (CST)
  - Summer (DST): UTC−5 (CDT)
- Area codes: 479, 501

The Arkansas River Valley, also known as the Arkansas Valley or the River Valley by locals, is a region in Arkansas defined by the Arkansas River in the western part of the state. Generally defined as the area between the Ozark and Ouachita Mountains, the River Valley is characterized by flat lowlands covered in fertile farmland and lakes periodically interrupted by high peaks. Mount Magazine, Mount Nebo, and Petit Jean Mountain compose the Tri-Peaks Region, a further subdivision of the River Valley popular with hikers and outdoors enthusiasts. In addition to the outdoor recreational activities available to residents and visitors of the region, the River Valley contains Arkansas's wine country as well as hundreds of historical sites throughout the area. It is one of six natural divisions of Arkansas.

== Definition ==
The Arkansas River Valley is informally defined along county boundaries, including all of Logan and Sebastian counties and portions of Conway, Franklin, Johnson, Perry, Pope, and Yell counties.

=== Subdivisions ===
- Arkansas Valley Hills - North and east of the Arkansas River, sometimes associated with the Ozarks
- Bottomlands - Low swamps and prairies along the Arkansas River itself, 10 miles (16 km) wide in some places
- Fort Smith metropolitan area - Sebastian, Crawford, and Franklin counties in Arkansas (also includes Le Fore and Sequoyah counties in Oklahoma)
- Ozark National Forest - a small, discontinuous portion of the federally protected area is within the region
- Tri-peaks Region - Region punctuated by three steep mountains: Mount Magazine, Mount Nebo and Petit Jean Mountain
- Valley - south of the Arkansas River, level plains and gently rolling hills
- Wine Country - American Viticultural Area near Altus

== History ==
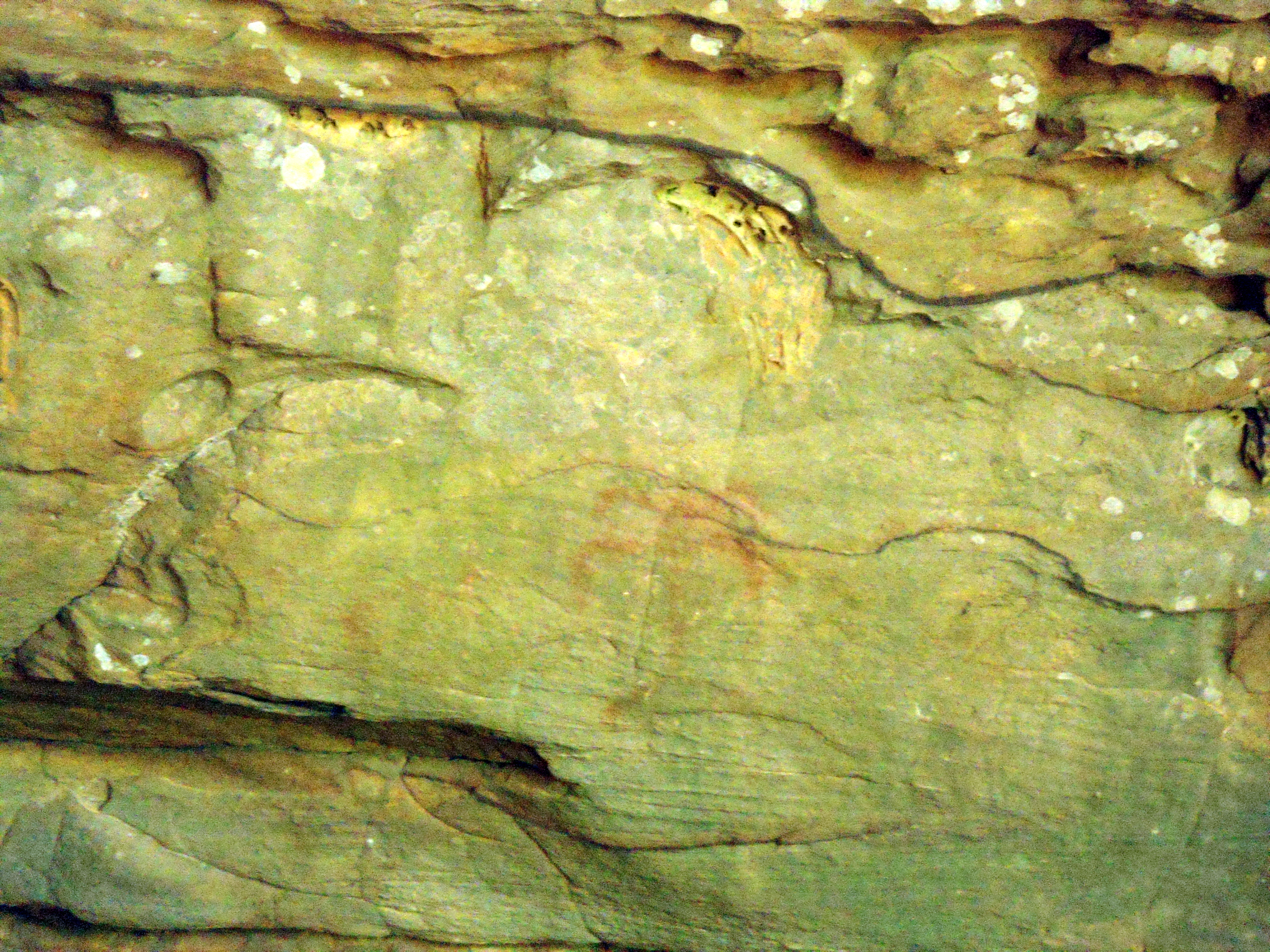
Anthropomorphic cave art in Rock House Cave at Petit Jean State Park

In the Pre-Colonial era, the River Valley was inhabited by Native American tribes, including Caddo, Cherokee, Choctaw, Osage, Tunica, and Quapaw tribes. Most first encounters describe scattered villages and individual farmsteads in the River Valley, unlike the organized "towns" and groves and orchards encountered in eastern Arkansas. Much of what is known about these early societies has been uncovered by the Arkansas Archaeological Survey and the Arkansas Archaeological Society at Carden Bottoms in Yell County near the Arkansas and Petit Jean Rivers. Research at the site has linked artifacts to cave art (pictured at right) in a cave on Petit Jean Mountain, as well as establishing links to the Caddo, Osage, and Quapaw tribes.

Hernando de Soto became the first European explorer to enter Arkansas in 1541. His expedition of 600 Spanish explorers searching for gold and riches crossed into Arkansas across the Mississippi River, and explored the state for the next two years. The expedition traveled to Tanico, an important city somewhere in the River Valley, in September 1542. The following month, the expedition fought with a tribe referred to as the Tula somewhere near Fort Smith. This fighting apparently caused de Soto to turn the expedition back east, leaving the River Valley.

=== Reconstruction through New South ===
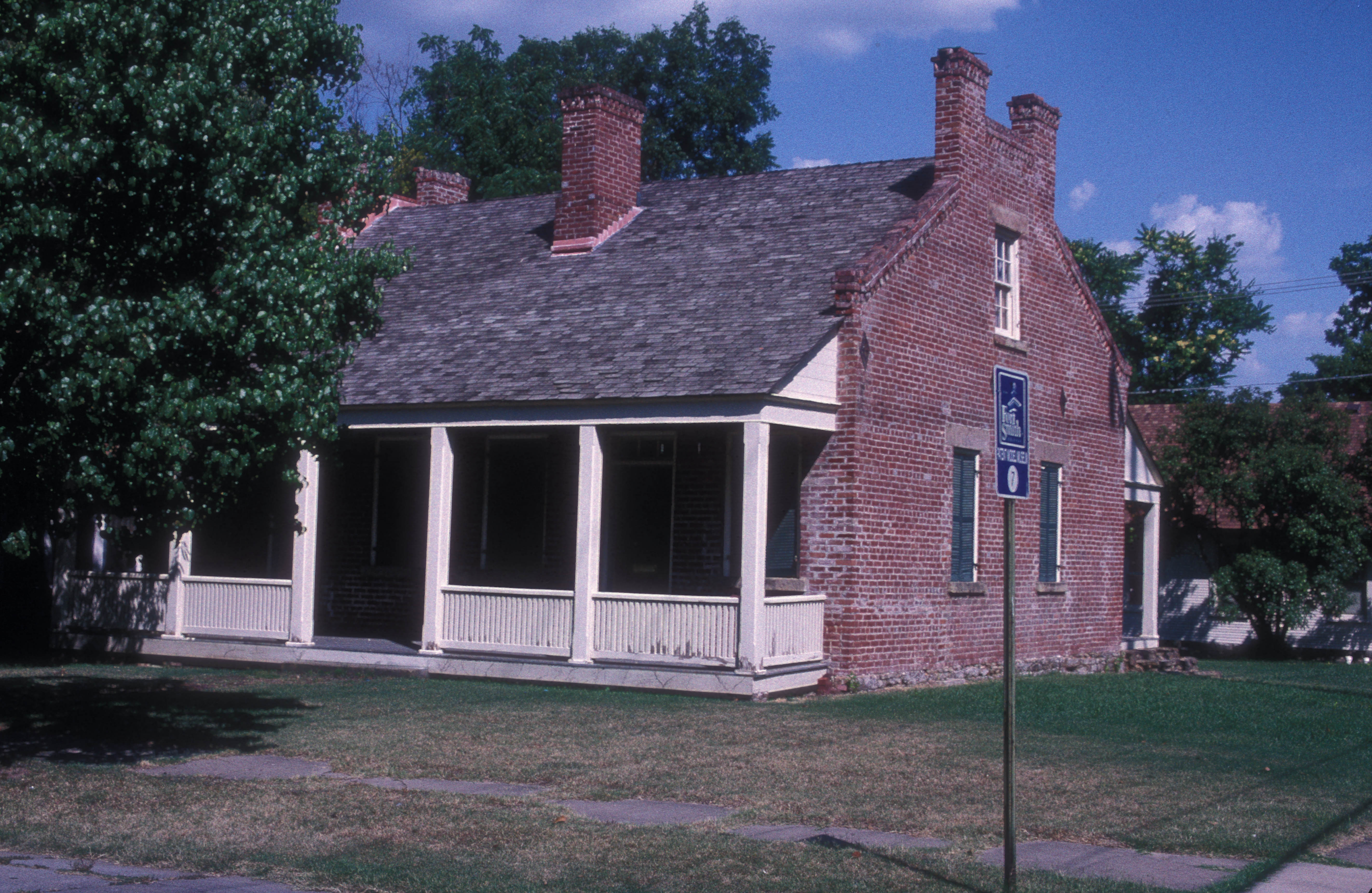
Fort Smith began to develop following Reconstruction, including the Belle Grove Neighborhood. Pictured here is the c. 1840 John Rogers House

Following the war, the Southern economy was in shambles, including Arkansas. The cost of the war effort, loss of human capital, and Confederate currency losing value were serious issues for the South in addition to the destruction of property, infrastructure, and crops. Many parts of Arkansas had descended into lawlessness and violence between whitecapping groups (including the Ku Klux Klan), freedmen, Republicans, and unaffiliated bandits taking advantage of the chaos. Indicative of the disarray, Radical Republican Governor Powell Clayton declared martial law in ten counties following reelection in 1868. Although no River Valley counties were initially subject to the proclamation, Clayton added four more counties, including one partial-River Valley county, Conway County. Since settlement, the River Valley had been a largely cashless society with significantly less reliance on slave labor compared to plantation agriculture areas like the Arkansas Delta and elsewhere in the Deep South. The Klan had limited support, and much of the area was viewed steadily Re Due to its relatively strong position following the Civil War, the River Valley attracted new settlement throughout Reconstruction. Populations of Austrian Catholics, German Catholics, and Lutherans were relocating to the River Valley. Some immigrated directly from Europe, but most came from early settlements in the Ohio River Valley. The Lutherans generally immigrated in organized companies, where the Catholics came independently, although some Catholic settlements like Clarksville and Subiaco were founded by organized groups. These settlements received support from existing immigrant populations in Little Rock and Fort Smith, and groups of Protestant settlers also establishing settlements in the area. Several of the River Valley's small towns were founded by these groups, beginning as small clusters of immigrants and evolving into cohesive communities.

Many immigrants came to the River Valley searching for agricultural prosperity, particularly by farming cotton, which could fetch high prices at market and quickly turn a farm into a profitable enterprise. Upon arriving in the region, many found only densely forested upland to be the only property they could afford. River Valley soil and climate are much less conducive to cotton cultivation than the Arkansas Delta, and many settlers struggled. Eventually, a preference for mixed farming emerged, including potatoes and other garden vegetables, to protect against a poor cotton crop sending a farm into economic ruin.

==== Coal Mining ====
Coal mining was an important industry in the River Valley's early history.

Coal fields in Arkansas are found in the Arkansas River Valley, spanning about 33 miles wide and 60 miles long. The coal deposits generally attain a thickness of up to nine feet and tend to be smaller because of their lenticular shape and geological variations. Coal types range from low-volatile bituminous in the west to semianthracite in the east. Notable benefits of Arkansas coal include minimal smoke emissions and low sulfur content, which enhance its efficiency. Additionally, it boasts a higher carbon content, producing between 13,000 and 15,000 BTU, compared to just 7,500 BTU for Pennsylvania coal.

Coal in the Arkansas River Valley was identified as early as April 21, 1819, by preeminent and far-ranging field naturalist Thomas Nuttall when he wrote, "About six miles above Rocky Creek we passed the Charbonniere, so called from the occurrence of coal in its vicinity."

Until 1880, most coal was used locally for blacksmiths. From 1880 to 1920, coal became Arkansas's main mineral fuel, powering locomotives and heating homes. However, after 1920, the rise of oil and its byproducts led to a decline in coal mining. By 1922, oil surpassed coal in Arkansas’s mineral output, leading to a decline in coal production over the next 30 years. By 1967, production dropped to 189,000 tons from 2,400,000 tons in 1909. Currently, Arkansas has no active coal mines, with the last one closing in 2017.

Dangerous and demanding, the industry attracted Swiss and German immigrants who were unable to establish productive farms. Mining of semi-anthracite and lignite coal began near Spadra as early as 1840. Mining became prominent by 1873, especially around the Altus area. In 1939, Arkansas shipped 1.1 million short tons (1.00 Mt) worth more than $4 million ($93 million in 2025 dollars) throughout a radius from Oklahoma to St. Louis, with Sebastian County as the leading producer.

The Swiss and German immigrants found the rolling hills similar to the topography of their homeland. Due to the climate, fertile soil and immigrants accustomed to wine with their meals, several wineries were established in the River Valley. The German community thrived with coal mining and railroad work driving the local economy. The Central Collegiate Institute was established in Altus in 1876 (now known as Hendrix College in Conway) and Hiram and Lydia College in 1890 (which went defunct in 1906). However, the railroad's prominence declined during the Great Depression, shrinking Altus's economy and population. Today, the Altus Area Coal Miner's Memorial is a series of five sculptures paying homage to area coal miners, with the names of over 2,500 local miners engraved at the site. Greenwood also has a Coal Miner's Memorial near the town square, with a restored coal railroad car and names of Sebastian County coal workers engraved on site.

Elsewhere in the River Valley, cotton and timber had given way to strawberry, hay, and cattle. However, competition introduced into the market by the railroads allowed farmers in Texas and other states to undercut the prices offered by River Valley farmers. An exploration period for a new regional crop tested beans, legumes, and tomatoes before settling on mustard greens and spinach. The spinach and greens products allowed Alma to leverage its existing fruit canning facility owned by the Alma Canning and Evaporating Company, which had been in the area since 1888. In 1987, Alma claimed the title of "Spinach Capital of the World" and erected a Popeye statue in front of the Chamber of Commerce building.

== Geography ==
=== Cities ===
The most populous city within the River Valley is Fort Smith, the principal city of the Fort Smith metropolitan area that also includes Van Buren and Alma. Fort Smith is the third-largest city in Arkansas, and serves as a regional hub for culture, health care and transportation. Approximately 84 miles (135 km) east, Russellville was the 16th largest city in Arkansas at the 2010 Census. The city is an important economic, education and population center in the state. Other cities in the River Valley are mostly of county-level significance, gateways to nearby recreational sites or small rural settlements. Cities such as Booneville, Clarksville, Morrilton, Paris, and Perryville serve as cultural and economic centers within the rural counties of the River Valley.

=== Climate ===
The River Valley has generally mild winters and hot, humid summers. Temperatures are generally warmer than in the Ozarks and cooler than Central Arkansas, although the wide variance in elevation in the River Valley can create locally different climatic conditions. The western portion of the River Valley (i.e., around Fort Smith) is situated near an area known as Tornado Alley in the central United States.

== Culture ==
Vineyards and wineries around Altus have been in the same family for generations. The River Valley's first wineries date to the postbellum era, when they were founded to produce wine for the Swiss and German immigrants relocating to the area to work in coal mines. This culture lives on today in the five vineyards still in operation. The Chateau Aux Arc Vineyards and Winery is the largest US Chardonnay producer outside of California, and the largest Zinfandel producer in Arkansas. Mount Bethel Winery has been in operation for over 100 years, and offers a tasting, tour and gift shop for visitors. The Post Winery has been in the Post family for five generations. Visitors can buy wines, tour the winery and watch the production process.

=== Arts ===
The Alma Performing Arts Center is the largest and most popular performing arts venue in the River Valley. In Russellville, the Arkansas River Valley Arts Center offers visual arts as well as art classes and infrequent performances. The Greenwood Performing Arts Center has over 1,000 seats and is used for various performances in the city. In Clarksville, the Walton Fine Arts Center on the campus of the University of the Ozarks offers university theater, performers, and speakers to patrons. The Stephens Gallery hosts exhibits of glass and ivory carvings. In Van Buren, the King Opera House is a restored 1880s opera house, now holding various events throughout the year.

=== Annual cultural events ===
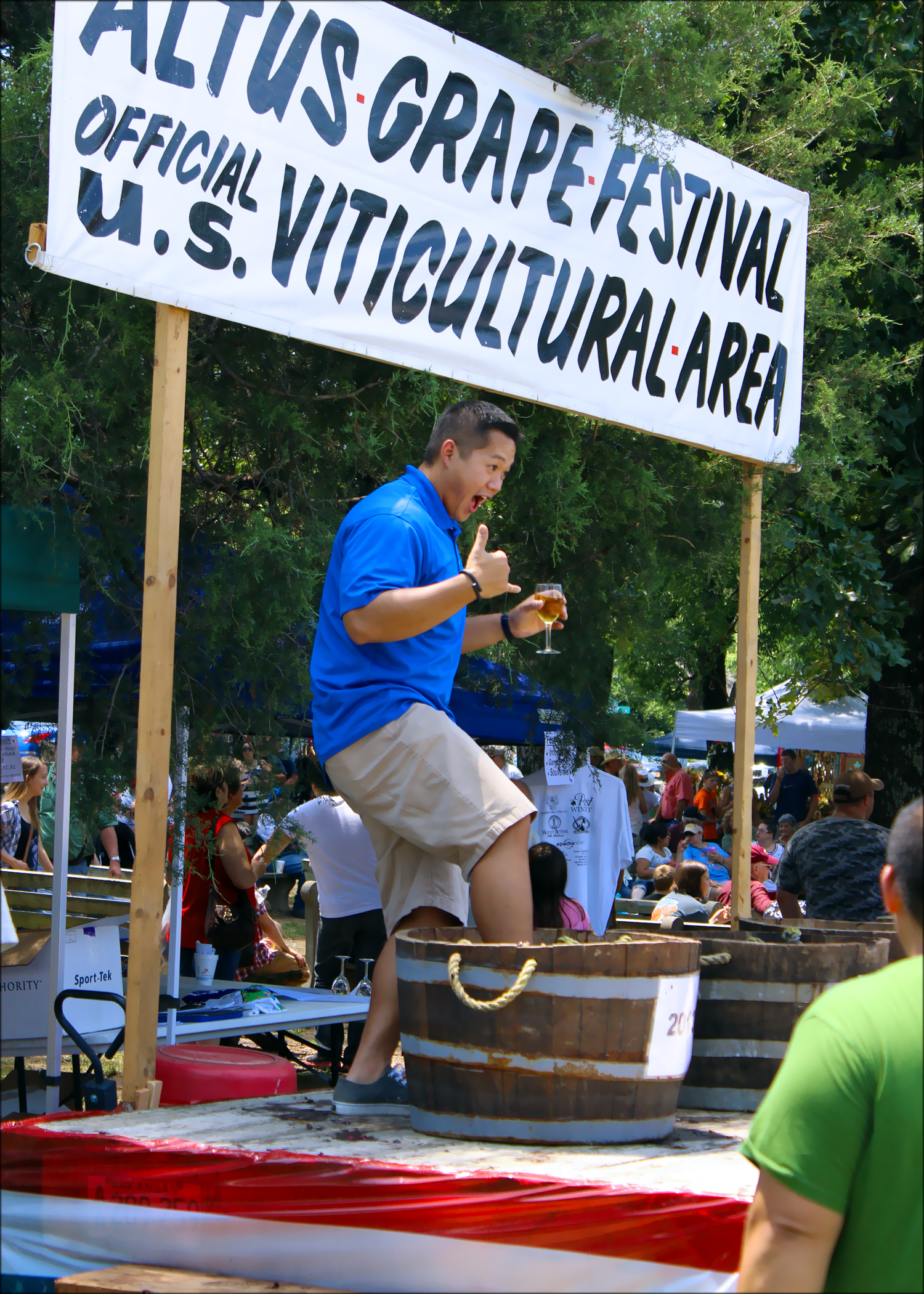
A festival attendee participates in traditional grape stomping at the 2013 Altus Grape Festival

The River Valley is home to several annual cultural events, including art, history, music, and traditional heritage festivals. Many events are held at the state parks and on town squares throughout the River Valley.

Petit Jean State Park hosts an annual Wildflower Weekend in April and a Rendezvous the weekend after Thanksgiving. The Museum of Automobiles atop Petit Jean Mountain hosts annual Antique Auto Show and Swap Meet events in June and September. Mount Magazine hosts an annual International Butterfly Festival in June, Frontier Days in October, and is the final destination on the Peak to Peak Poker Run, which begins at Queen Wilhelmina State Park in May.

- Adona Bluegrass Festival in Adona, second weekend in July
- Fourche River Days in Perryville, April. Car show and festival entertainment.
- Global Village Day at Heifer International, October.
- Jammers Reunion in Adona, April. Bluegrass festival.

The Alma Spinach Festival held on the third weekend in April pays homage to Alma's reputation as "Spinach Capital of the World".

In Clarksville, the Johnson County Peach Festival is the longest-running festival in Arkansas. Held annually in July, the festival offers peach pit spitting contest and a terrapin derby in addition to a parade and traditional food and craft vendors.

The Wiederkehr Weinfest in Wiederkehr Village, a winery founded by Johann Andreas Wiederkehr, is a free harvest festival held annually in October, including wine tasting, vineyard tours, music, polka dancing, traditional German cuisine and other festival entertainment. First held in 1963, Weinfest is one of the most popular festivals in the region.

Two major yard-sale events, Bargains Galore on Highway 64 and Big To Do on Highway 22, happen annually in the River Valley. Residents and businesses along the highways offer items for sale to visitors and residents traveling two of the main east–west highways in the River Valley.

==== County Fairs ====
- Conway County, September
- Johnson County, August
- North Franklin County, October
- North Logan County, August
- Perry County, September
- Pope County, September
- Sebastian County, August
- South Franklin County, September
- South Logan County, September
- Yell County, September
- Arkansas/Oklahoma State Fair (at Fort Smith), September–October

=== Museums ===
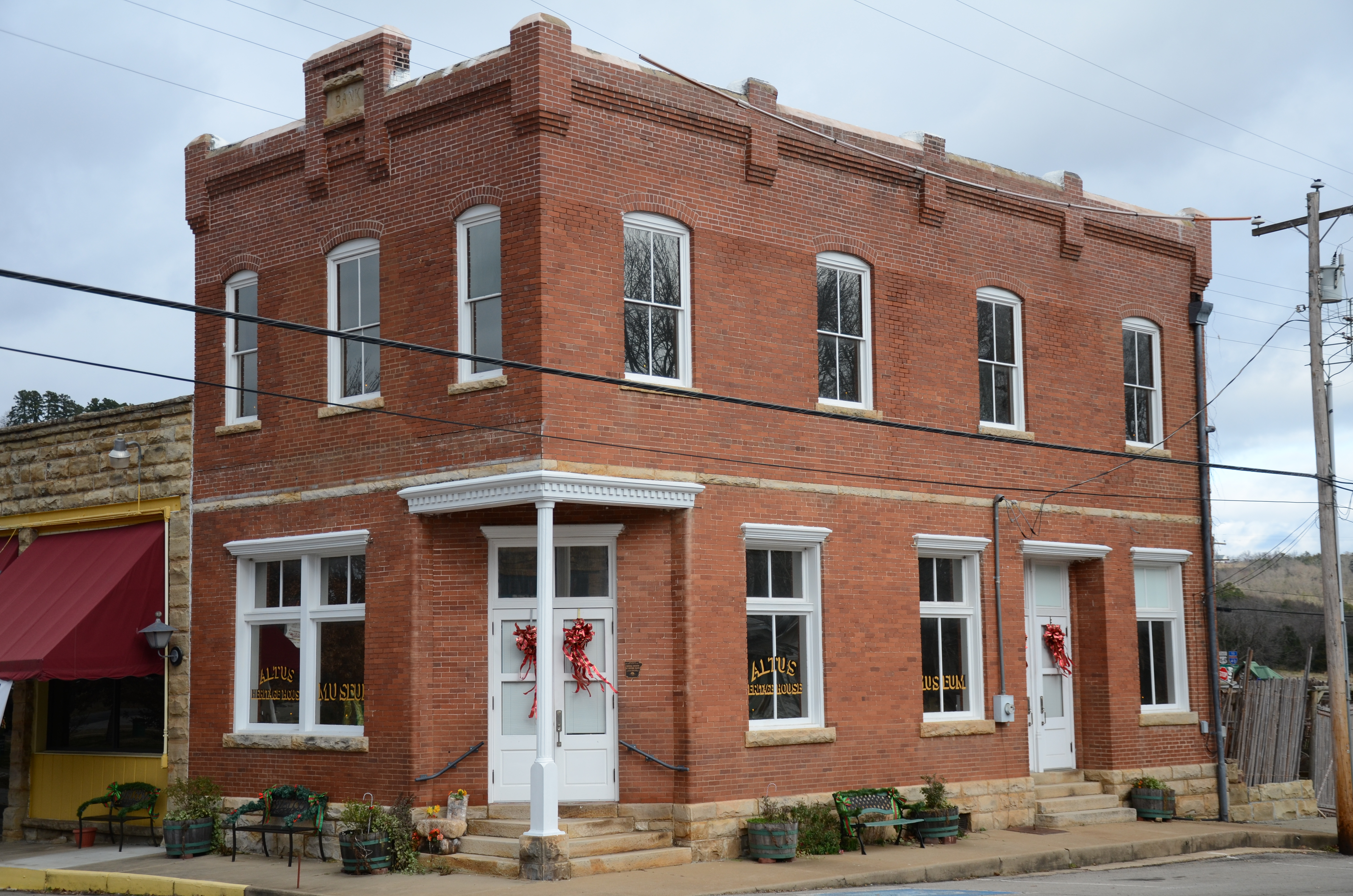
Built in 1905, the Altus Heritage House Museum resides in the restored German-American Bank in downtown Altus

A host of regional and local history museums preserve and interpret the history and culture of the River Valley's early settlers, small towns, historic events, and rural residents.

- Altus Heritage House Museum 106 N. Franklin in Altus. Pays homage to the early settlement history of Swiss and German immigrants to the region, with emphasis on the coal mining industry. Housed in an original German-American State Bank and is listed on the National Register of Historic Places
- Arkansas Historic Wine Museum, 101 N. Carbon City Rd in Paris. Museum preserves and interprets the history of the wine industry in Arkansas, including equipment for pressing, fermenting, storing, and labeling.
- Arkansas Tuberculosis Sanatorium Museum, 256 Carey Rd in Booneville. Preserves a 1910 tuberculosis treatment facility that became the largest in the US by 1940. Museum exhibits detail the history, research, patients, staff, and period medical implements.
- Belle Museum and Chapel, 322 E. Main Street in Charleston
- Charleston National Commemorative Site 125 W. Main Street in Charleston. Honors the Charleston School District as the first public school system to integrate within The South. Following the May 1954 U.S. Supreme Court decision in Brown v. Board of Education of Topeka, Kansas, the school board ordered the integration of grades 1–12 in August 1954. Successful integration without violence wasn't noticed by the press until three weeks after school began.
- Evans Museum, 6335 N. Highway 109 in Magazine
- Fort Smith National Historic Site, 301 Parker Avenue in Fort Smith. Contains two restored forts, a jail, and a former courtroom to tell the story of frontier life and justice in Fort Smith.
- John P. McConnell Exhibit, 419 N. Kennedy in Booneville. Exhibit honors the former United States Air Force Chief of Staff during the Vietnam War, who was born in Booneville
- Johnson County Historical Society Heritage Center, 131 W. Main Street in Clarksville
- Logan County Coal Miners Memorial and Museum, 804 S. Elm Street in Paris
- Logan County Museum, 202 N. Vine Street in Paris
- Old Jail Museum, 305 E. Center Street in Greenwood
- Ozark Area Depot Museum, 103 E. River Street in Ozark
- United States Marshals Museum, 14 N Third Street in Fort Smith

=== Protected areas ===
The River Valley contains a large quantity of protected areas, with broad diversity across the region and several different managing agencies.

Near Booneville, Blue Mountain Lake offers a variety of recreational opportunities. The Blue Mountain Wildlife Demonstration Area is a bird-dog field training center of international renown. The Jack Creek Recreation Area and Knopper's Ford Recreation Area offer well-known Arkansas swimming holes as well as hiking, camping and fishing.

Near Clarksville, the Spadra Waterfront Marina offers RV camping, boat rentals, and guided trips along Spadra Creek. North of Clarksville, Lake Ludwig offers swimming, boating and fishing to visitors.

South of Dardanelle, the Holla Bend National Wildlife Refuge protects over 7,000 acres (2,800 ha) of bottomland and wetland surrounded by a cutoff meander of the Arkansas River. Wintering waterfowl and other migrating species use the area as a safe haven during their journey. The NWR offers a driving tour with interpretative signs.

On the Fourche LaFave River near Ola, the Nimrod Lake is managed by the USACE as a crappie fishing destination and camping area.

Near Ozark, the Aux Arc Park offers boating access to the Arkansas River and RV sites.

Ozark Lake, formed on the Arkansas River southwest of Mulberry, is surrounded by a WMA

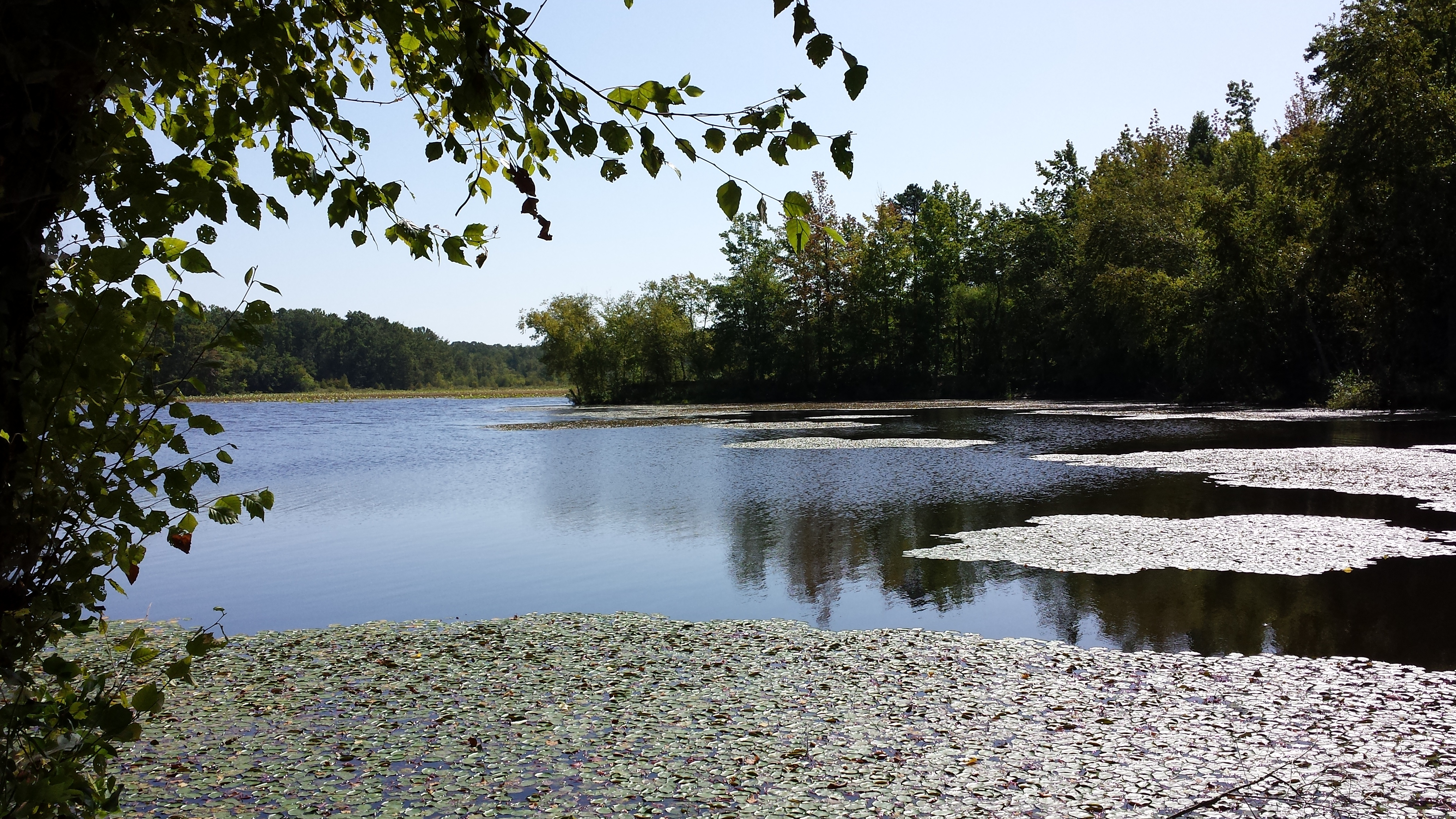
Lake Bailey at Petit Jean State Park

- Flatside Wilderness Area
- Illinois Bayou River
- Lake Dardanelle State Park
- Lake Overcup
- Mount Magazine State Park
- Mount Nebo State Park
- Mulberry River
- Ozark Highlands Trail
- Petit Jean State Park
- Shores Lake/White Rock Mountain
- Springhill Park Mountain Bike Trail

== Recreation ==
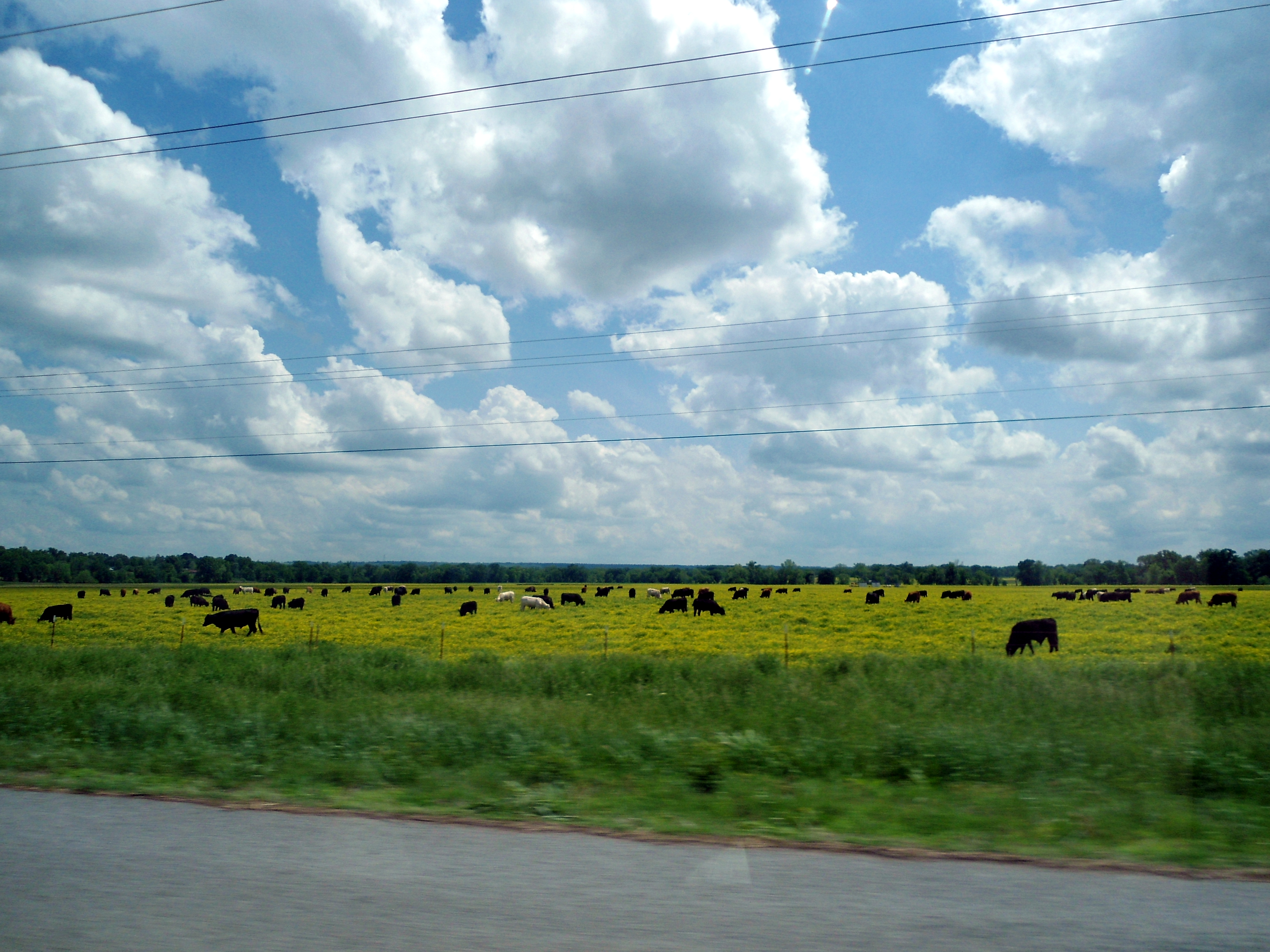
Livestock grazing in a flat, flowering pasture near Mulberry

The United States Forest Service operates both the Ouachita National Forest and the Ozark National Forest within the region, offering trails, camping, and fishing over thousands of acres of public land. The state operates four parks within the region: Lake Dardanelle State Park, Mount Magazine State Park, Mount Nebo State Park, and Petit Jean State Park.

== See also ==
- Arkansas Delta
- Arkansas Timberlands
- Central Arkansas
- Ouachita Mountains
- The Ozarks
