= Blue Mountain Lake (Arkansas) =

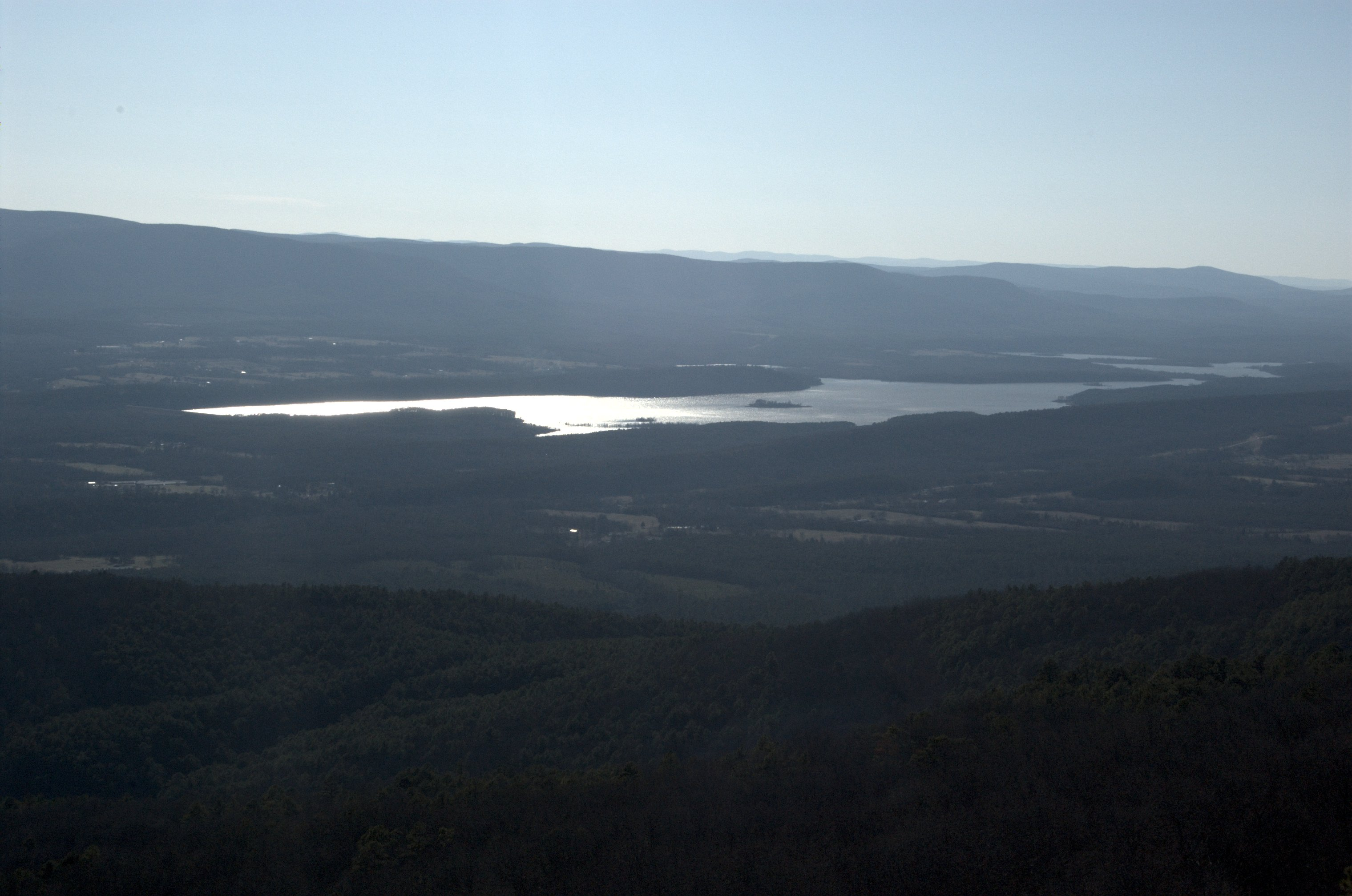
- Lake as viewed from an overlook

- Location within Arkansas
- Country: United States
- Location: Logan / Yell counties, Arkansas, United States
- Coordinates: 35.101372°N 93.70101°W
- Status: Open
- Construction began: June 1941, suspended November 1942, resumed April 1946
- Opening date: June 1947
- Construction cost: $4,770,000
- Owner: United States Army Corps of Engineers

Dam and spillways
- Type of dam: Earthen
- Impounds: Petit Jean River
- Height: 118 feet (36 m)
- Length: 2,800 feet (850 m)
- Elevation at crest: 452 feet (138 m)
- Spillways: 1
- Spillway type: 150 feet (46 m) ungated concrete

Reservoir
- Creates: Blue Mountain Lake
- Catchment area: 488 square miles (1,260 km^{2})
- Surface area: 2,890 acres (1,170 ha)
- Maximum water depth: 30 feet (9.1 m)
- Normal elevation: 384 ft (117 m)
- Website https://www.swl.usace.army.mil/Missions/Recreation/Lakes/Blue-Mountain-Lake/
- Blue Mountain WMA
- IUCN category V (protected landscape/seascape)
- Area: 3,400 ha (13 sq mi)
- Operator: Arkansas Game and Fish Commission
- Owner: USACE
- Website: www.agfc.com/wma/blue-mountain-wma/

Blue Mountain Lake is a reservoir in the Arkansas River Valley region near Mount Magazine just west of the small town of Havana, Arkansas, United States. The reservoir was created following completion of Blue Mountain Dam on the Petit Jean River by the United States Army Corps of Engineers in 1947. The project was primarily designed for flood control, with secondary recreation and fish and wildlife uses. Since completion, the lake has served as a popular outdoor recreation destination, including fishing, camping, boating, water skiing, sightseeing and hiking. Hunting is also available on the Blue Mountain Wildlife Management Area managed by the Arkansas Game and Fish Commission.

== History ==
The area surrounding Blue Mountain Lake contained an unincorporated community known as Patsie, several cemeteries, and a resort town known as Blue Mountain platted following construction of the Choctaw, Oklahoma and Gulf Railroad in 1899. The lake was one of many authorized by the Flood Control Act of 1938, proposed by the Corps of Engineers on the Petit Jean River to control flooding in Logan County. Construction began in June 1941, was suspended in November 1942 due to World War II, resumed April 1946, and was completed in June 1947.

== Environment ==
The lake is located in the Arkansas River Valley ecoregion. The immediate vicinity of Blue Mountain Lake is part of the Arkansas Valley Plains subregion, once covered by a distinctive mosaic of prairie, savanna, and woodland. Today, pastureland and hay land are extensive but remnants of prairie and woodland occur. The Corps manages bottomland hardwood forest, pine plantations, old growth pine stands, pine-oak-hickory mixed forest, wetlands and grasslands surrounding the lake.

Other tributaries contributing to the lake include Ashley Creek, Cedar Creek, Crow Creek, Lick Creek, and Sugar Creek.

== Recreation ==
The lake offers fishing, boating, swimming and camping; it is also the focal point of the view from the lodge atop Mount Magazine, home of Mount Magazine State Park. Blue Mountain Lake is accessible from Highway 10 west of Havana by turning south on Highway 309.

The Corps operates 15 recreation areas around Blue Mountain Lake, with another one operated by the City of Magazine (Magazine Ballpark). Waveland Park Recreation Area is the primary access point to the lake, with 51 campsites, a cypress tree-lined swimming beach, and pavilion. Campgrounds are also available Ashley Creek Recreation Area on the lake, Hise Hill Recreation Area on the upper Petit Jean River, and Outlet Area Park on the downstream side of the dam.

Primitive camping and water access are available at Persimmon Point and Persimmon Point East. Primitive camping only is available at Persimmon Point West, Crow Creek, Lease Three, Twin Coves, Pecan Grove, and Big Island. Water access only is available at, Narrows Bend Access, Hall Access, Lick Creek Access, and Third Bridge Access. Future accesses are planned at Kilburn Bridge and Highway 309.

=== Wildlife Management Area ===
The Blue Mountain Wildlife Management Area contains 8,300 acres (3,400 ha) on the north and south sides of the lake managed by the Arkansas Game and Fish Commission. Anglers seek largemouth bass, white bass, crappie, bluegill, and catfish. Hunters use the lake for waterfowl hunting, with the shoreline and surrounding woods used for deer hunting, as well as turkey and bear hunting.

The J. Perry Mikles Blue Mountain Special Use Area serves as a field trial area for sporting dogs.

== Bibliography ==
- Farquhar, Carley (1966). The Sportsman's Almanac. New York: Harper and Row.
- Sutton, Keith B (2000). Fishing Arkansas. Fayatteville: University of Arkansas Press.
