= Cove Lake Spillway Dam-Bridge =

- Cove Lake Spillway Dam/Bridge
- U.S. National Register of Historic Places
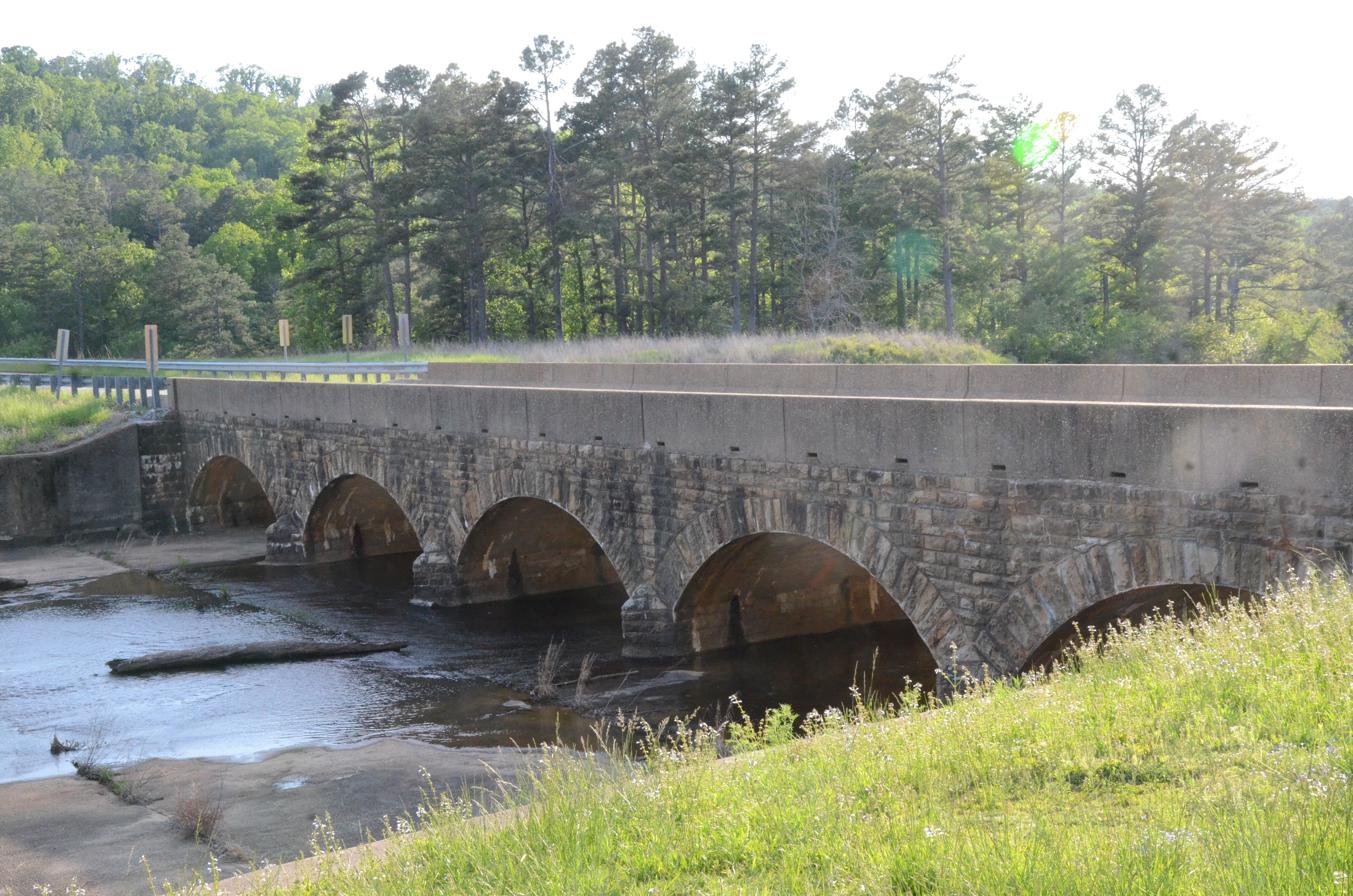

- Location within Arkansas Location within the United States
- Nearest city: Ozark-St. Francis National Forest, near Corley, Arkansas
- Coordinates: 35°13′58″N 93°37′45″W
- Area: 4 acres (1.6 ha)
- Built: 1937
- Architect: Works Progress Administration
- Architectural style: Rustic
- NRHP reference No.: 94001618
- Added to NRHP: September 11, 1995

The Cove Lake Spillway Dam and Bridge are historic structures in Ozark-St. Francis National Forest, north of Corley, Arkansas. The dam is built of earth and stone, and impounds Cove Lake, location of a recreation area in the national forest. The bridge is a five-span masonry arch structure, built across the dam spillway, where it carries Arkansas Highway 309. The dam and bridge were built in 1937 with funding from the Works Progress Administration, and is a fine example of the Rustic architecture WPA projects were known for.

The structures were listed on the National Register of Historic Places in 1995.

== See also ==
- Cove Creek Bridge (Corley, Arkansas)
- Cove Creek Bridge (Martinville, Arkansas)
- Cove Creek Tributary Bridge
- List of bridges documented by the Historic American Engineering Record in Arkansas
- List of bridges on the National Register of Historic Places in Arkansas
- National Register of Historic Places listings in Logan County, Arkansas
