= Cove Creek Tributary Bridge =

- U.S. National Register of Historic Places
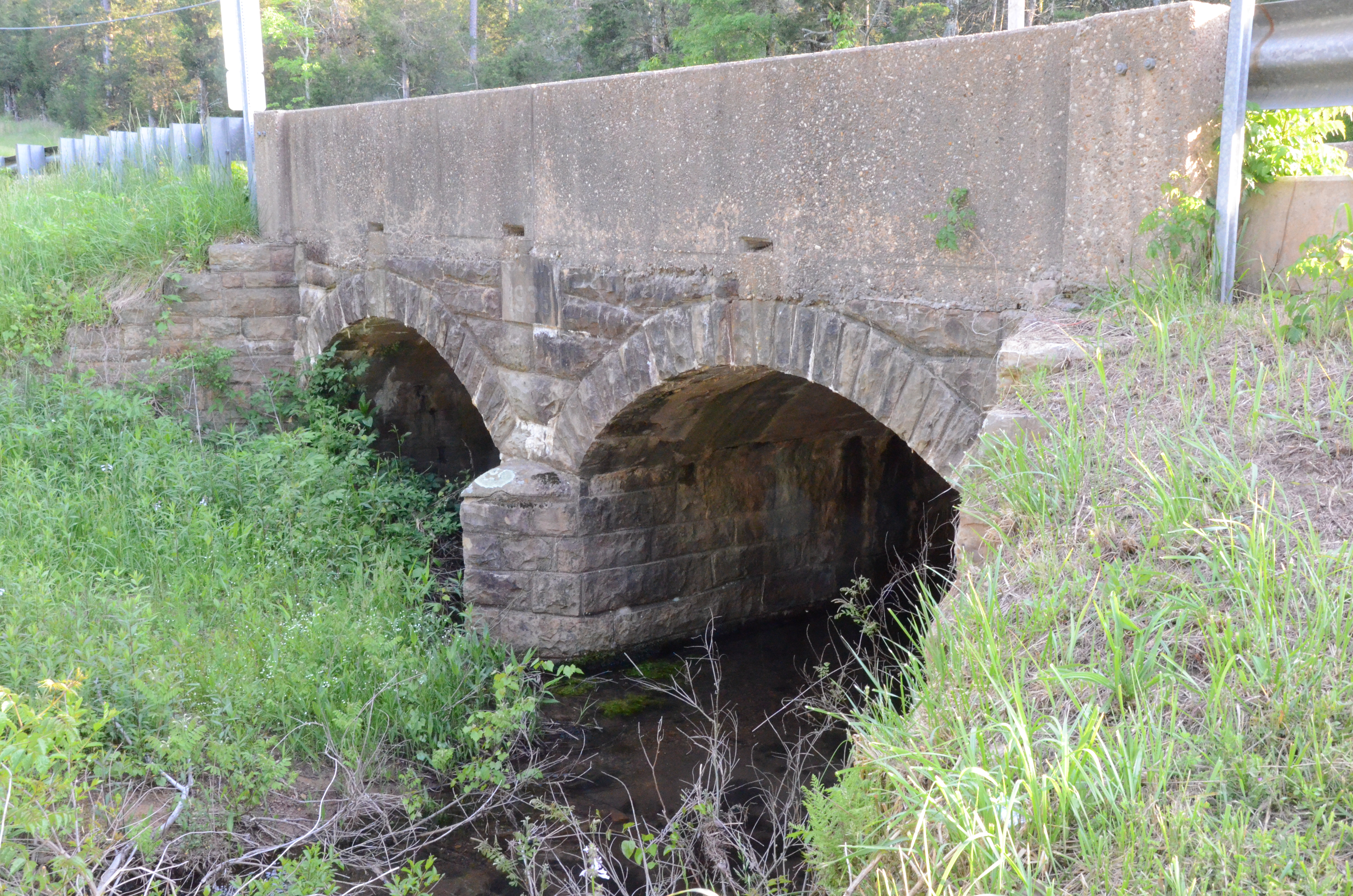

- Location within Arkansas Location within the United States
- Nearest city: Corley, Arkansas
- Coordinates: 35°14′31″N 93°38′22″W
- Area: less than one acre
- Built: 1936
- Architectural style: Closed-spandrel masonry arch
- MPS: Historic Bridges of Arkansas MPS
- NRHP reference No.: 95000644
- Added to NRHP: May 26, 1995

The Cove Creek Tributary Bridge is a historic bridge in rural Logan County, Arkansas. It is a two-span closed-spandrel stone arch bridge, carrying Arkansas Highway 309 across a tributary of Cove Creek north of Corley in Ozark-St. Francis National Forest. Each of its arches is 11 feet (3.4 m) long, and the structure is an overall 23 feet (7.0 m) in length. Concrete barriers form the sides of the bridge on either side of the roadway. The bridge was built in 1936 under the auspices of the Arkansas Highway Commission. The bridge was built in 1936 by the Works Progress Administration (WPA).

The bridge was listed on the National Register of Historic Places in 1995.

== See also ==
- Cove Creek Bridge (Corley, Arkansas)
- Cove Creek Bridge (Martinville, Arkansas)
- Cove Lake Spillway Dam-Bridge
- List of bridges documented by the Historic American Engineering Record in Arkansas
- List of bridges on the National Register of Historic Places in Arkansas
- National Register of Historic Places listings in Logan County, Arkansas
