= Cove Creek Bridge (Corley, Arkansas) =

- U.S. National Register of Historic Places
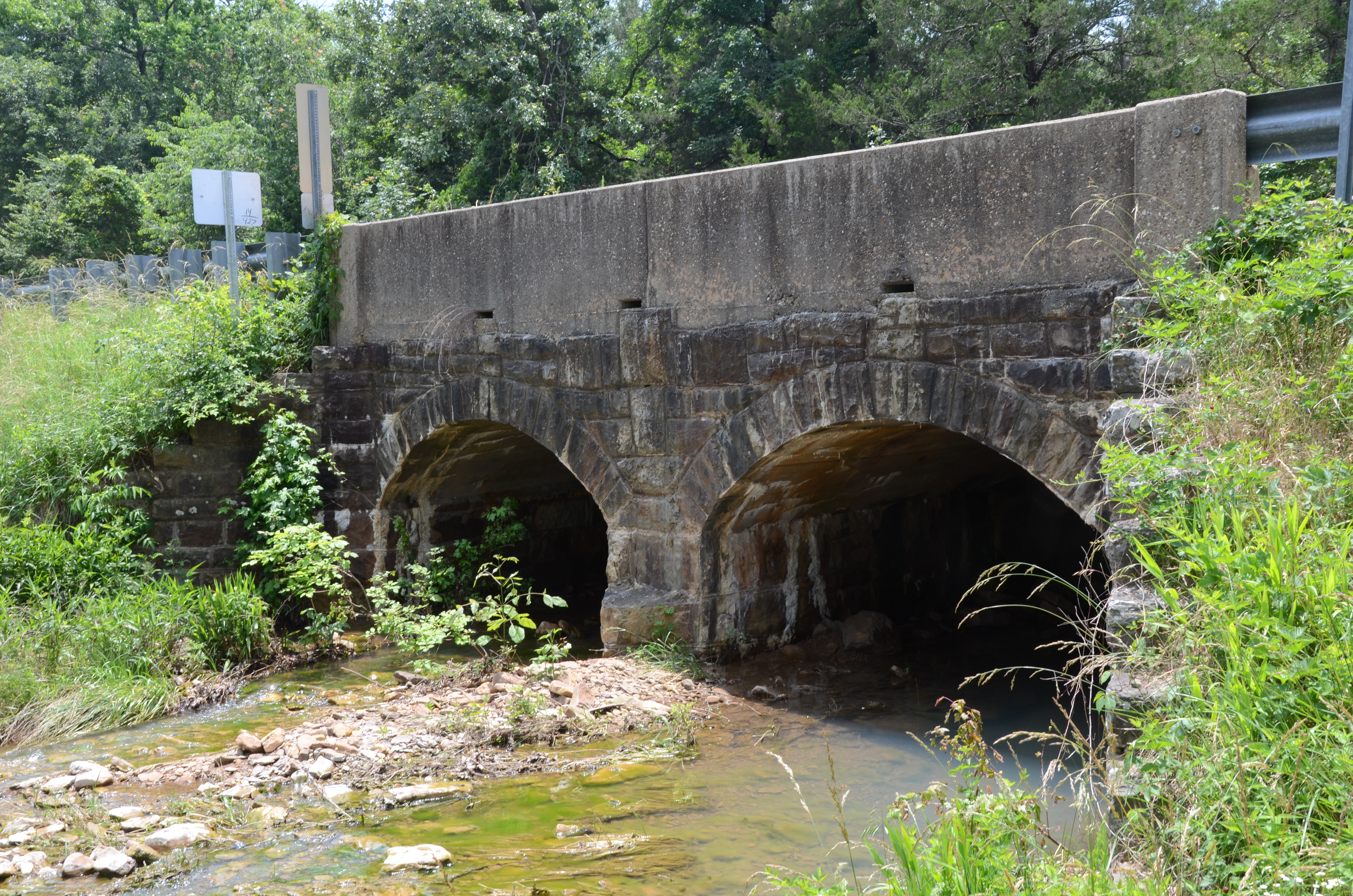

- Location within Arkansas Location within the United States
- Nearest city: Corley, Arkansas
- Coordinates: 35°11′35″N 93°37′24″W
- Built: 1936
- Architect: WPA
- Architectural style: Closed-spandrel masonry arch
- MPS: Historic Bridges of Arkansas MPS
- NRHP reference No.: 95000645
- Added to NRHP: May 26, 1995

The Cove Creek Bridge is a historic bridge, carrying Arkansas Highway 309 across Cove Creek, south of the hamlet of Corley, Arkansas in the Ozark-St. Francis National Forest. It is a two-span closed-spandrel masonry arch structure, with each span measuring 13 feet (4.0 m) and an overall structure length of 26 feet (7.9 m). It is built entirely out of stone, with a concrete and asphalt deck, and concrete barriers at the sides. It was built in 1936 with funding support from the Works Progress Administration.

The bridge was listed on the National Register of Historic Places in 1995.

== See also ==
- Cove Creek Bridge (Martinville, Arkansas)
- Cove Creek Tributary Bridge
- Cove Lake Spillway Dam-Bridge
- List of bridges documented by the Historic American Engineering Record in Arkansas
- List of bridges on the National Register of Historic Places in Arkansas
- National Register of Historic Places listings in Logan County, Arkansas
