= Belle Grove Historic District =

Historic district in Arkansas, United States

- Fort Smith's Belle Grove Historic District
- U.S. National Register of Historic Places
- U.S. Historic district
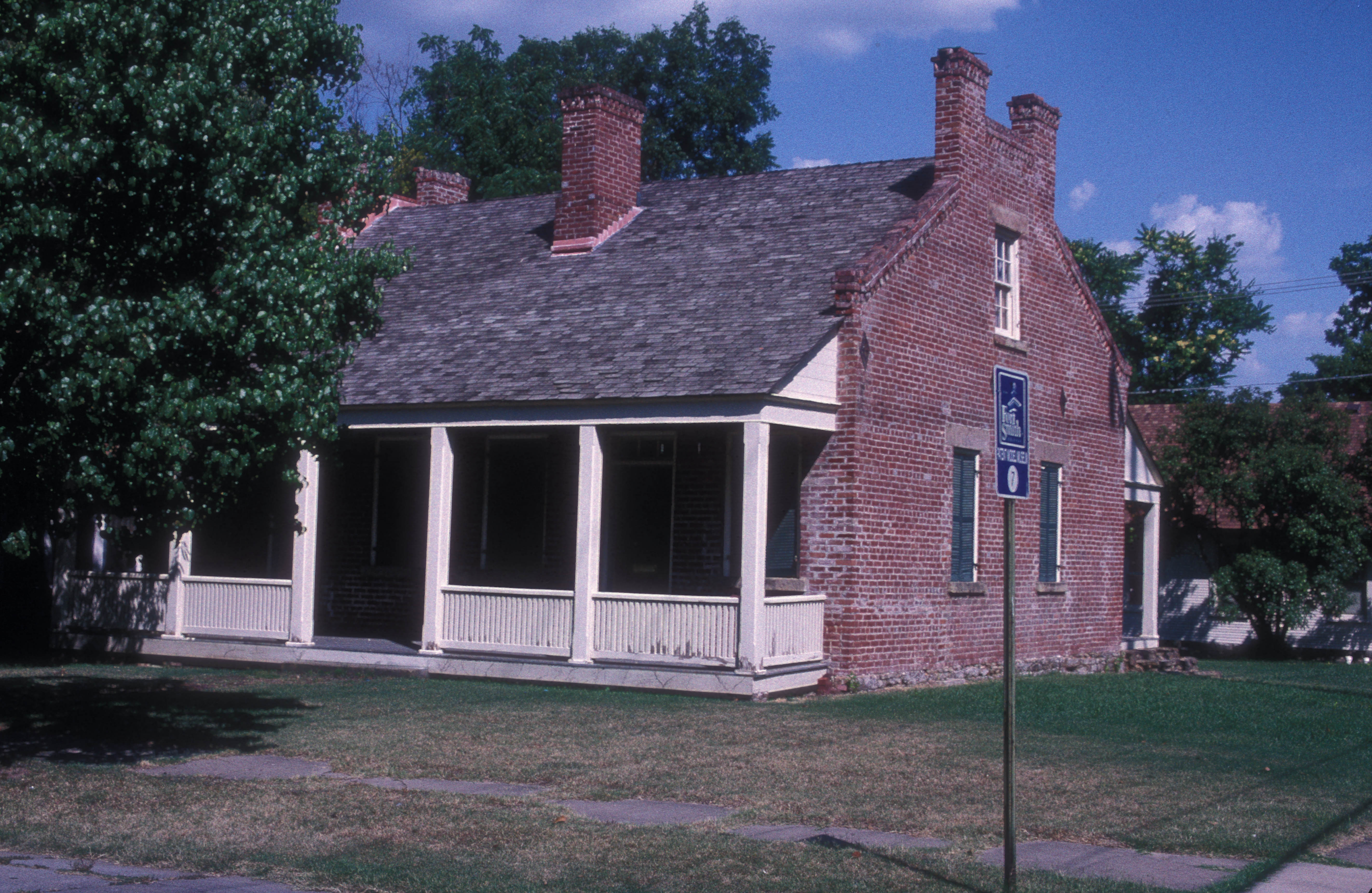

- Location within Arkansas Location within the United States
- Location: Bounded by N. 4th, N. 9th, N. B, and N. H Sts., Fort Smith, Arkansas
- Area: 65 acres (26 ha)
- Architect: Multiple
- Architectural style: Late Victorian
- NRHP reference No.: 73000392
- Added to NRHP: July 16, 1973

Belle Grove Historic District is a predominantly residential historic district north of the central business district of Fort Smith, Arkansas. This area became an affluent residential area not long after Fort Smith was established in 1842, and was most heavily developed between about 1870 and 1930. It is one of the oldest residential neighborhoods in the state. It includes a cross-section of architectural styles popular in the late 19th and early 20th centuries, although its oldest building, the c. 1840 John Rogers House (400 N 8th St), is Greek Revival in style. The district is roughly bounded by North 4th, North 9th, North "B", and North "H" Streets.

The district was listed on the National Register of Historic Places in 1973.

== See also ==
- National Register of Historic Places listings in Sebastian County, Arkansas
