= Cove Lake Bathhouse =

- U.S. National Register of Historic Places
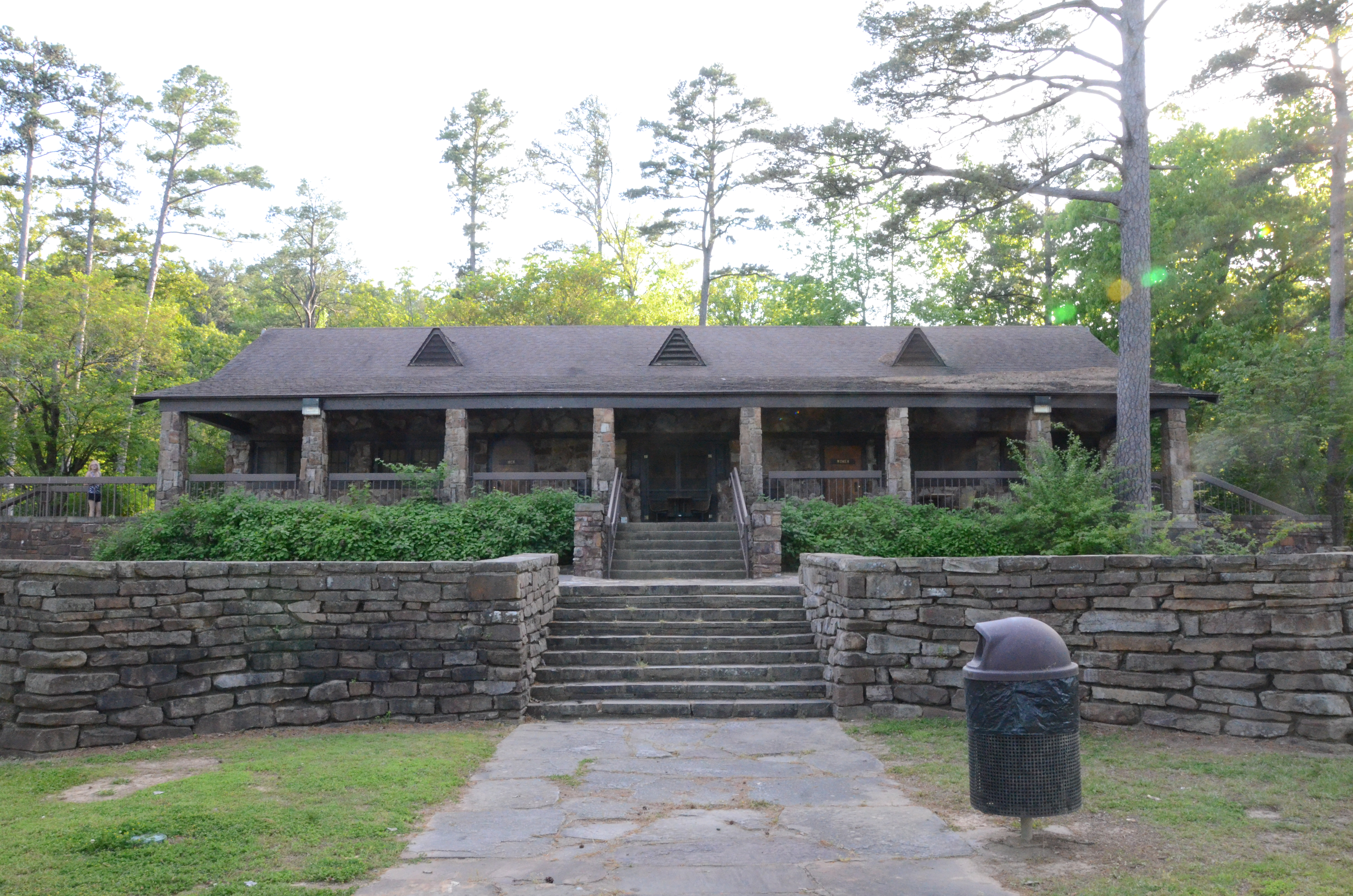

- Location within Arkansas Location within the United States
- Location: Forest Service Rd. 1608A in the Ozark-St. Francis National Forest, near Corley, Arkansas
- Coordinates: 35°13′44″N 93°37′45″W
- Area: 1.5 acres (0.61 ha)
- Built: 1937
- Built by: Works Progress Administration
- Architectural style: Rustic
- NRHP reference No.: 94001617
- Added to NRHP: September 11, 1995

The Cove Lake Bathhouse is a historic recreational facility at the Cove Lake Recreation Area, north of Corley, Arkansas in the Ozark-St. Francis National Forest. It is a T-shaped stone structure, built of fieldstone with a gabled roof. A porch extends across the front, supported by stone piers. The roof is pierced by three triangular dormers with vents in them. It was built in 1937 with funding from the Works Progress Administration, and represents a distinctive departure from the more typical Rustic architecture produced by WPA projects.

The building was listed on the National Register of Historic Places in 1995.

== See also ==
- National Register of Historic Places listings in Logan County, Arkansas
