= Cove Creek Bridge (Martinville, Arkansas) =

- Formerly listed on the U.S. National Register of Historic Places
- Location within Arkansas Location within the United States
- Nearest city: AR 124, Martinville, Arkansas
- Coordinates: 35°19′23″N 92°29′8″W
- Area: less than one acre
- Built: 1957
- Built by: Forsgren Brothers
- Architectural style: Pratt through truss
- NRHP reference No.: 04000499

Significant dates
- Added to NRHP: May 24, 2004
- Removed from NRHP: January 24, 2017

The Cove Creek Bridge was a historic bridge in rural eastern Conway County, Arkansas. It carried Arkansas Highway 124 across Cove Creek, just west of the hamlet of Martinsville, and west of the city of Twin Groves. It was a three-span steel structure with a total length of 267 feet (81 m). The main span was a Pratt through truss 101 feet (31 m), mounted on concrete piers, while the approach spans on either end were smaller pony trusses each 83 feet (25 m) long. The bridge was built in 1957, and was the one of few Pratt truss bridges in the state.

The bridge was listed on the National Register of Historic Places in 2004. It was replaced in 2011, and was delisted from the National Register in 2017.

== See also ==
- Cove Creek Bridge (Corley, Arkansas)
- Cove Creek Tributary Bridge
- Cove Lake Spillway Dam-Bridge
- National Register of Historic Places listings in Conway County, Arkansas
- List of bridges on the National Register of Historic Places in Arkansas
