= Mount Magazine State Park =

State park in Arkansas, United States

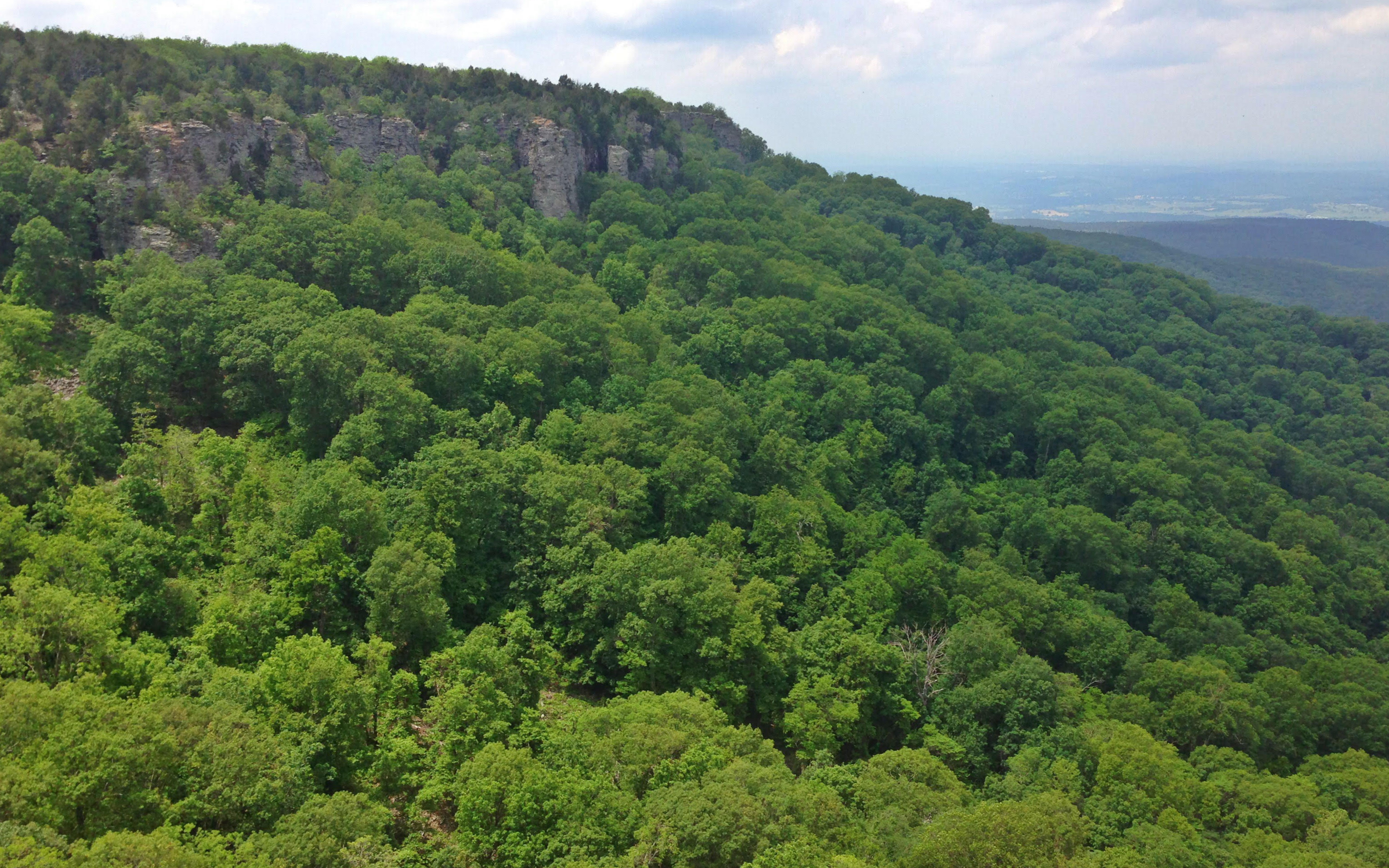
- Looking west from Mount Magazine's Cameron Bluff

- Location within Arkansas Location within the United States
- Interactive map of Mount Magazine State Park
- Location: Logan County, Arkansas, United States
- Coordinates: 35°10′29″N 93°37′07″W
- Area: 2,234 acres (904 ha)
- Elevation: 2,753 ft (839 m)
- Established: 1983
- Administrator: Arkansas Department of Parks, Heritage and Tourism, U.S. Forest Service
- Website: Official website
- Arkansas State Parks

Mount Magazine State Park is a 2,234-acre park located in Logan County, Arkansas. Inhabited since the 1850s, Mount Magazine first became part of the Ouachita National Forest in 1938, was re-designated as part of the Ozark National Forest in 1941, and became a state park after a 22-year conversion process from the U.S. Forest Service to the Arkansas Department of Parks and Tourism. Mount Magazine State Park is the highest in Arkansas. The park contains Mossback Ridge, including the peak of Mount Magazine (called Signal Hill) which contains The Lodge at Mount Magazine, cabins, trails, and a hang gliding area.

== History ==
Native Americans inhabited the mountain seasonally, often opting to permanently settle in the Arkansas River Valley surrounding the ridge. The Homestead Act of 1862 opened the mountain to settlers who began to populate the area, and the Summer Home School was opened in the late 1800s. The nearby town of Magazine was platted in 1900. The Great Depression forced many settlers off the mountain, with the Resettlement Administration eventually purchasing all private property on the mountain in 1934.

In 1938, Franklin Roosevelt reallocated the land to the U.S. Forest Service and the Works Progress Administration (WPA) began construction on a 27-room lodge the following year. In 1941, the area became a part of the Ozark National Forest, changing from the Ouachita National Forest designation received in 1938. The WPA and Civil Conservation Corps (CCC) also constructed a road to the mountain (which would become the Mount Magazine Scenic Byway), trails, two dams which created Cove Lake and Spring Lake, and an amphitheater. In 1971, the Mount Magazine Lodge burned and was a total loss.

After the lodge burned, tourism declined until new plans for a state park atop Mount Magazine came in the 1980s. The Arkansas Act 884 of 1983 allowed Arkansas State Parks to begin the process of a state park on Arkansas's highest point, and a partnership with the USDA Forest Service allowed the park to open in 1998 as Mount Magazine State Park.

== Recreation ==
The park offers a visitors center with interactive exhibits and a gift shop shortly after entering the park. Campers can choose from two class AAA campsites and 16 class AA tent-only campsites at Cameron Bluff Campground. Groups can rent the Greenfield Picnic Area, which is a large pavilion, or utilize the grills and tables at the Benefield, Brown Springs, or Cameron Bluff picnic areas for free. Hiking and horseback riding trails meander throughout the wooded areas of the park. Cycling is allowed throughout the park, and all paved routes feature bike lanes. Bike trails include the Huckleberry Mountain Horse Trail and the Will Apple's Road Trail. Blue Mountain Lake, Cove Lake, and Spring Lake all offer bream, catfish and largemouth bass in addition to free swimming. Cedar Piney Lake is also available for fishing but not swimming.

There also exist many opportunities for ATV riding, backpacking, hang gliding, mountain biking, rappelling, and rock climbing within the park. The park hosts the annual Mount Magazine International Butterfly Festival, and is a haven for many rare species of butterflies in Arkansas due to the special blend of altitude and temperature available. The state butterfly, the Diana fritillary, is found almost exclusively in the Arkansas River Valley and the Petit Jean River Valley.

The mountain is also home to black bear, whitetail deer, bobcat, and coyote as well as other species.

== The Lodge at Mount Magazine ==
In 2006, the multimillion-dollar Lodge at Mount Magazine and 13 cliffside cabins were opened. The 66,617-square-foot (6,189 m^{2}) rustic-style lodge offers 60 guest rooms, a grand lobby, a conference center, a business center, an indoor swimming pool, a fitness center, a gift shop, and panoramic views from every guest room. The Skycrest Restaurant offers traditional Southern cuisine, a two-story fireplace, and a view of the Petit Jean River Valley and distant Blue Mountain Lake.
