= Burnett Springs =

- U.S. National Register of Historic Places
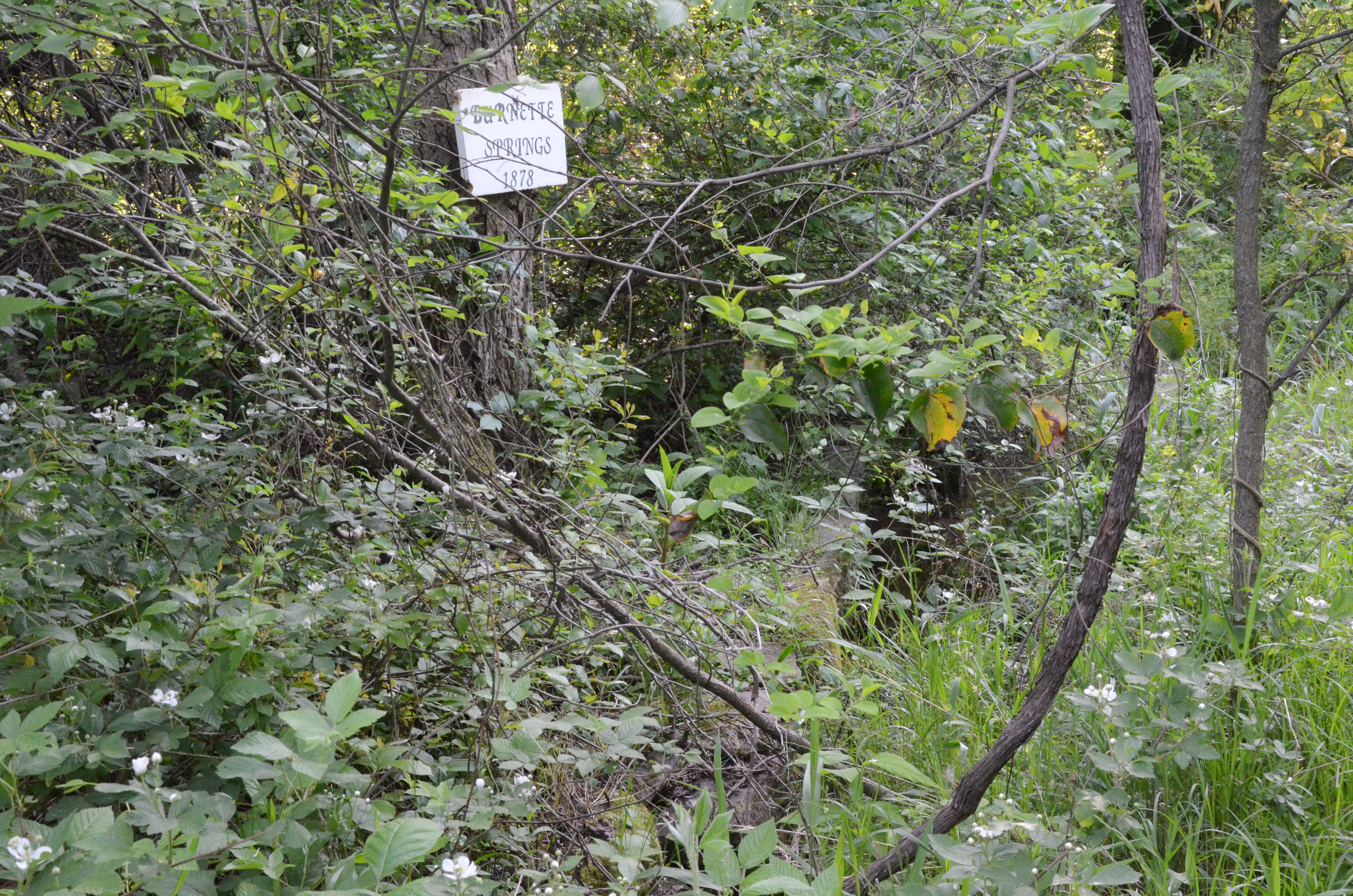

- Location within Arkansas Location within the United States
- Nearest city: End of County Road 704, approximately 1 mile (1.6 km) west of Corley, Arkansas
- Coordinates: 35°12′58″N 93°38′34″W
- Area: less than one acre
- Built: 1878
- Built by: Burnette, Captain John
- NRHP reference No.: 95001126
- Added to NRHP: September 22, 1995

Burnett Springs is the site of a former resort community in rural Logan County, Arkansas. It is located at the end of County Road 704, about 1 mile (1.6 km) west of the community of Corley. The area was developed as a spring-based spa resort by Captain John Burnette in the 1870s. A small town sprang around a three-story spa hotel, which fell into decline after 1915. The hotel burned in 1930, and all of the other buildings have succumbed to the elements. The only surviving above-ground feature is one of the spring sites, which is set in a stone reservoir box shelter from erosion by stone walls.

The site was listed on the National Register of Historic Places in 1995.

== See also ==
- National Register of Historic Places listings in Logan County, Arkansas
