= National Register of Historic Places listings in Dent County, Missouri =

Location of Dent County in Missouri

This is a list of the National Register of Historic Places listings in Dent County, Missouri.

This is intended to be a complete list of the properties and districts on the National Register of Historic Places in Dent County, Missouri, United States. Latitude and longitude coordinates are provided for many National Register properties and districts; these locations may be seen together in a map.

There are 8 properties and districts listed on the National Register in the county.

This National Park Service list is complete through NPS recent listings posted March 14, 2025.

== Current listings ==
	Name on the Register	Image	Date listed	Location	City or town	Description
1	Dam and Spillway in the Hatchery Area at Montauk State Park	Dam and Spillway in the Hatchery Area at Montauk State Park	February 26, 1985 (#85000528)	Off Route 119; 37°27′19″N 91°41′05″W	Salem	
2	Dent County Courthouse	Dent County Courthouse	February 23, 1972 (#72000711)	Main and 4th Sts. 37°38′44″N 91°32′08″W	Salem	
3	Lower Parker School	Lower Parker School	May 31, 1991 (#91000604)	Eastern bank of the Current River at Parker Hollow, Ozark National Scenic Riverways; 37°26′22″N 91°37′24″W	Salem	
4	Montauk State Park Open Shelter	Montauk State Park Open Shelter	February 28, 1985 (#85000529)	Off Route 119; 37°27′01″N 91°41′16″W	Salem	
5	Nichols Farm District	Nichols Farm District	December 27, 1989 (#89002129)	West of County Road V, north of the Current River; 37°26′31″N 91°37′13″W	Cedar Grove	
6	Nova Scotia Ironworks Historic District		August 25, 2003 (#03000793)	Mark Twain National Forest; 37°30′47″N 91°19′47″W	Salem	
7	Old Mill at Montauk State Park	Old Mill at Montauk State Park	June 27, 1985 (#85001478)	Off Route 119; 37°27′02″N 91°41′00″W	Salem	
8	W.A. Young House		March 30, 1989 (#88000147)	County Road 513; 37°37′02″N 91°27′25″W	Salem	

== See also ==
- List of National Historic Landmarks in Missouri
- National Register of Historic Places listings in Missouri
