= Razor Hollow =

Valley in the American state of Missouri

Razor Hollow is a valley in northwest Shannon County in the U.S. state of Missouri. The intermittent stream in the hollow flows northeast and enters the Current River about two miles southeast of Cedargrove and the confluence of Big Creek with the Current.

The source area for the stream is at 37°22′39″N 91°36′36″W and the confluence with the Current is at 37°23′54″N 91°35′33″W at an elevation of 814 feet (248 m). The ridges on either side of the narrow valley are at 1,100 to 1,200 feet (340 to 370 m) in elevation.

Razor Hollow was so named on account of sharp rocks in the valley.
