= Big Creek (Current River tributary) =

Stream in the U.S. state of Missouri

Coordinates: 37°24′49″N 91°36′21″W

Big Creek is a stream in Shannon and Texas counties in the Ozarks of southern Missouri. It is a tributary of the Current River.

The stream headwaters are in Texas County at and the confluence with the current is in the northwest corner of Shannon County at . Cedargrove lies just north of the confluence. Razor Hollow flows parallel to the lower reaches of Big Creek and enters the Current about two miles southeast of Big Creek's confluence.

Big Creek was so named on account of its size.

== See also ==
- List of rivers of Missouri
