= Ozarks =

Highland region in central-southern United States

The Ozarks
- Region
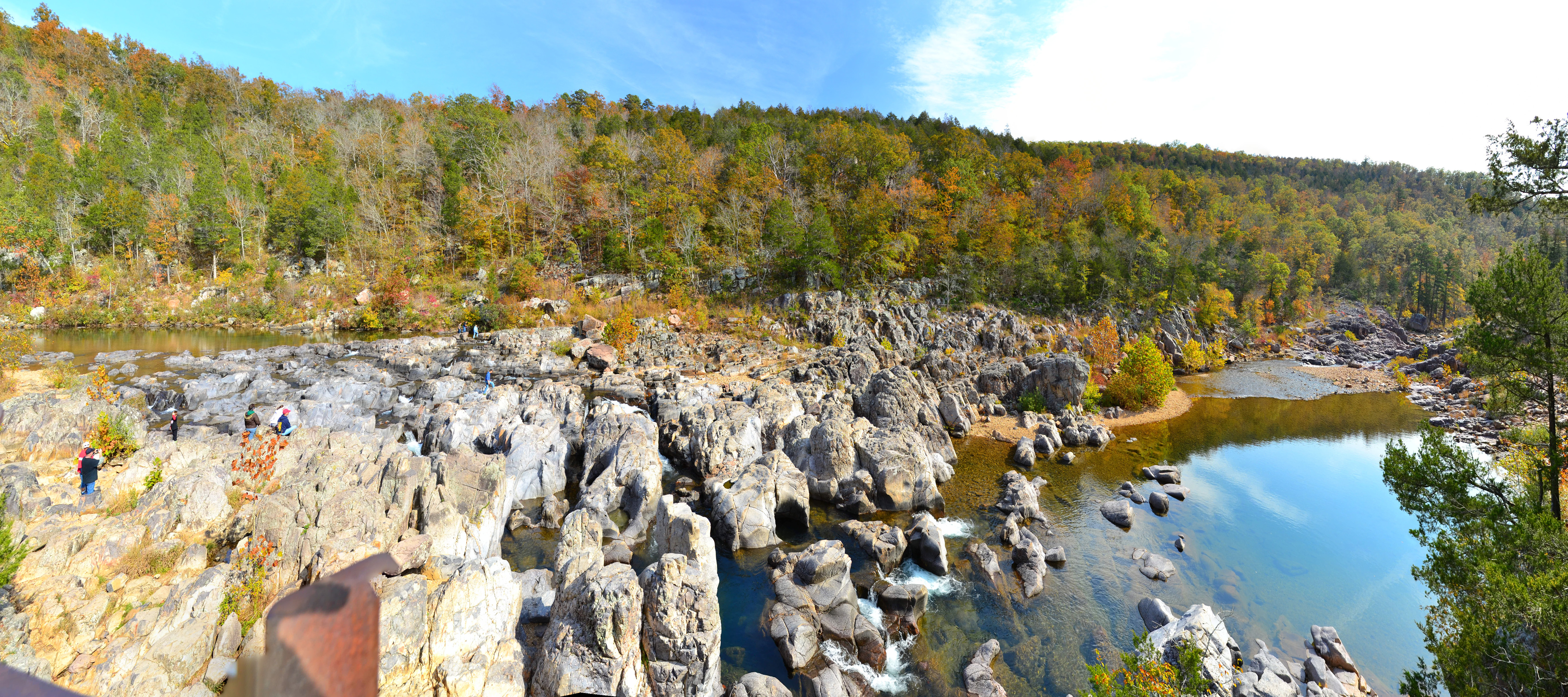
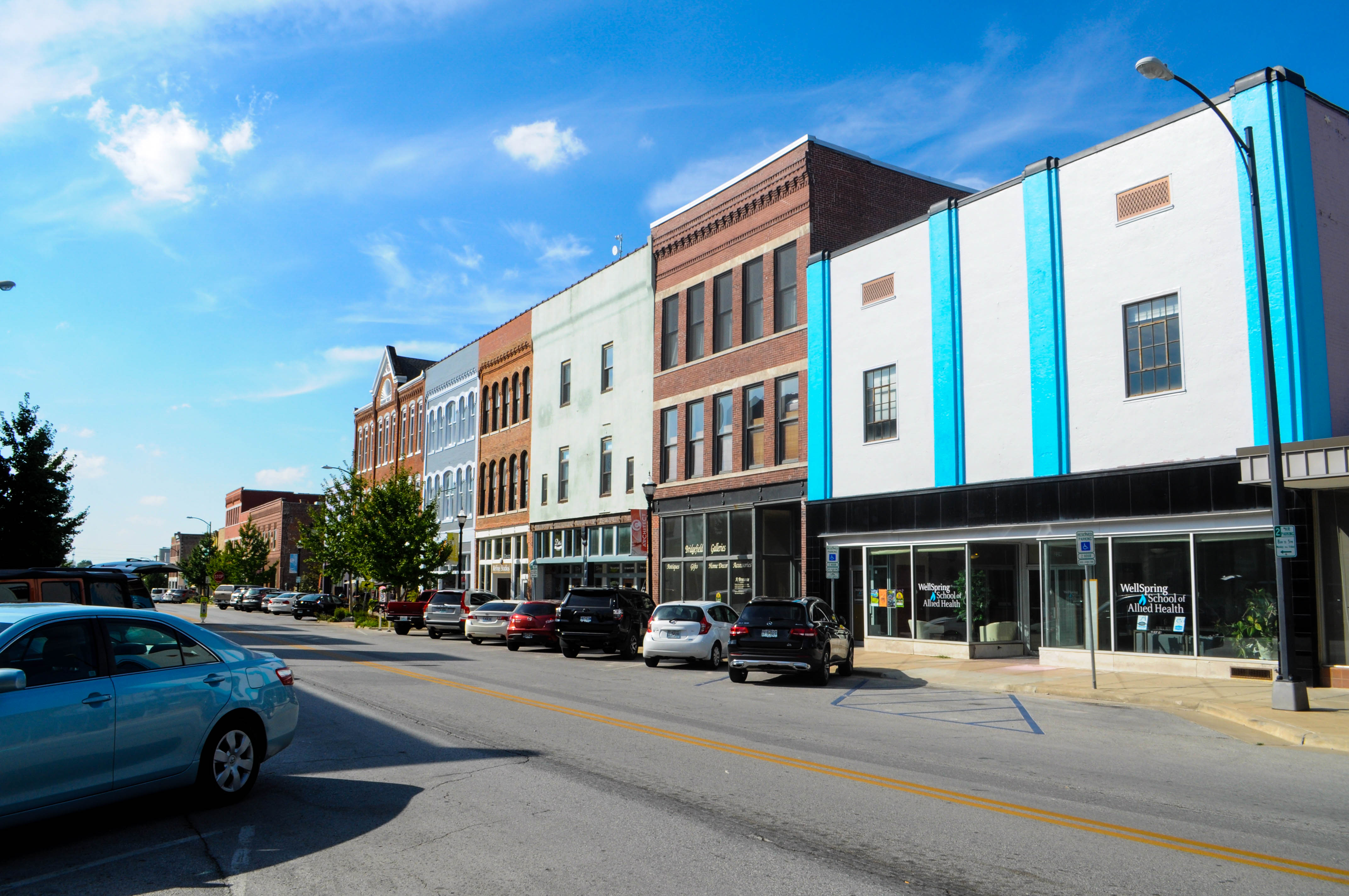
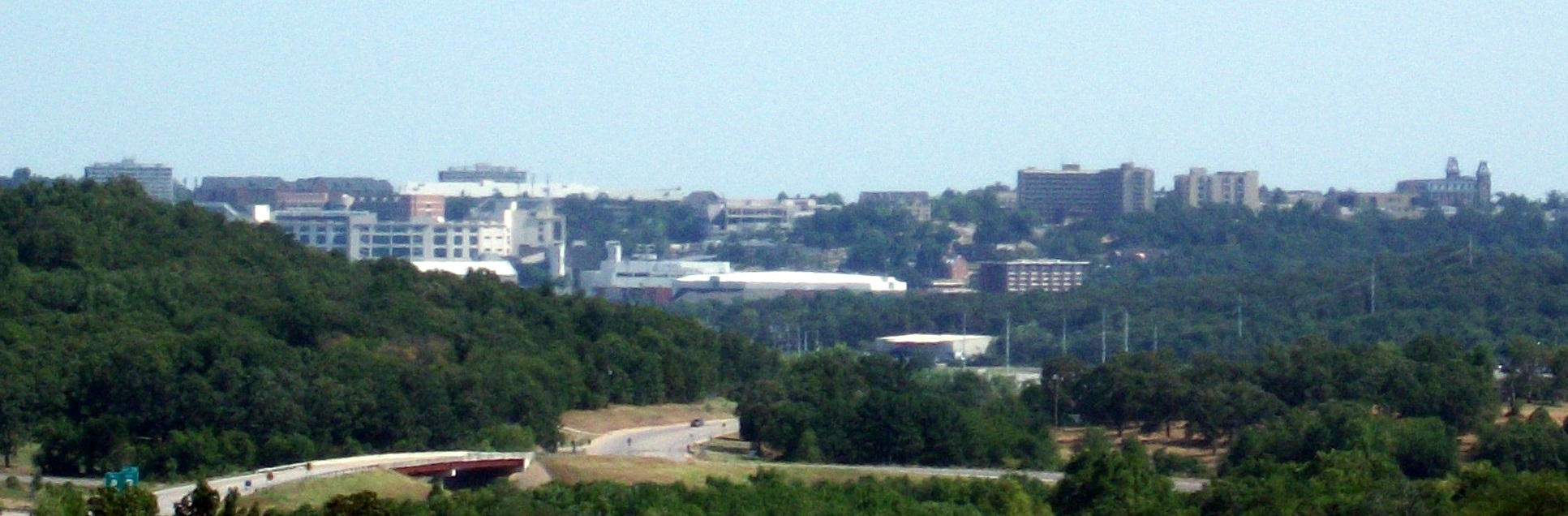
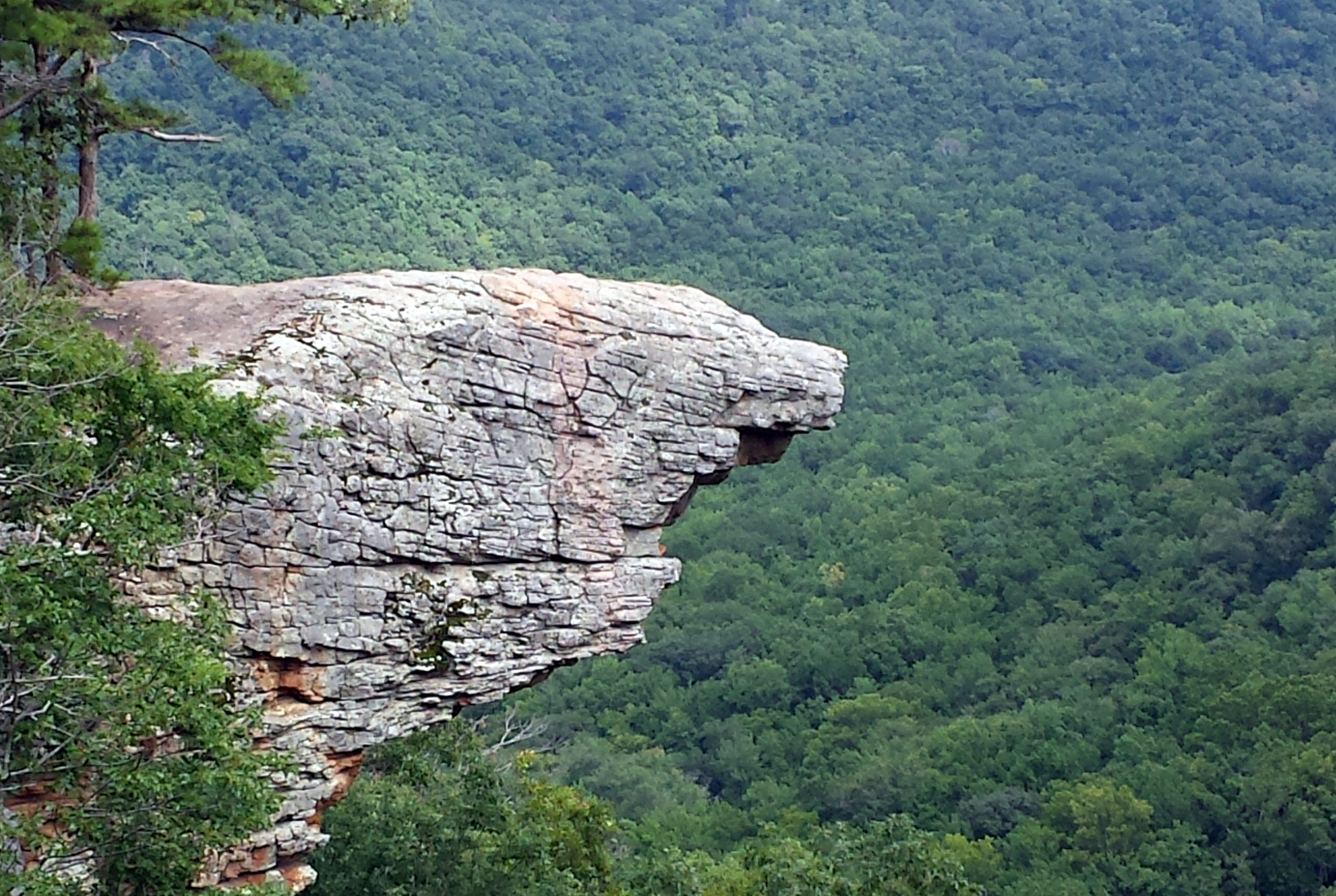
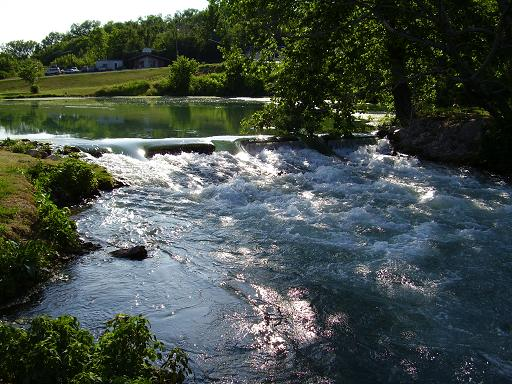
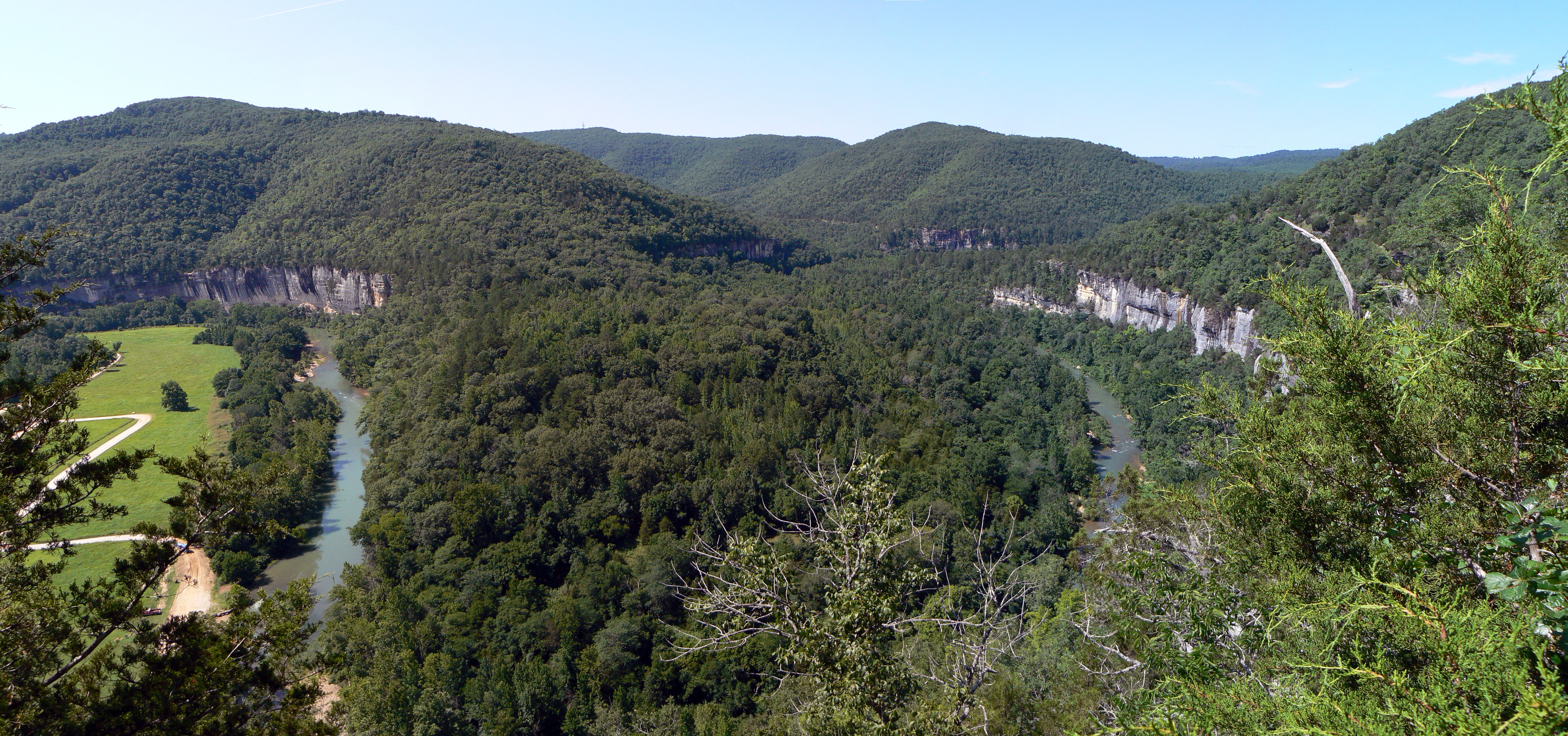
- Left–right from top: Johnson's Shut-Ins State Park; Commercial Street, Springfield, MO; Meramec Caverns; Fayetteville, Arkansas; Hawksbill Crag in the Upper Buffalo Wilderness; Mammoth Spring State Park; Buffalo National River in Newton County, AR

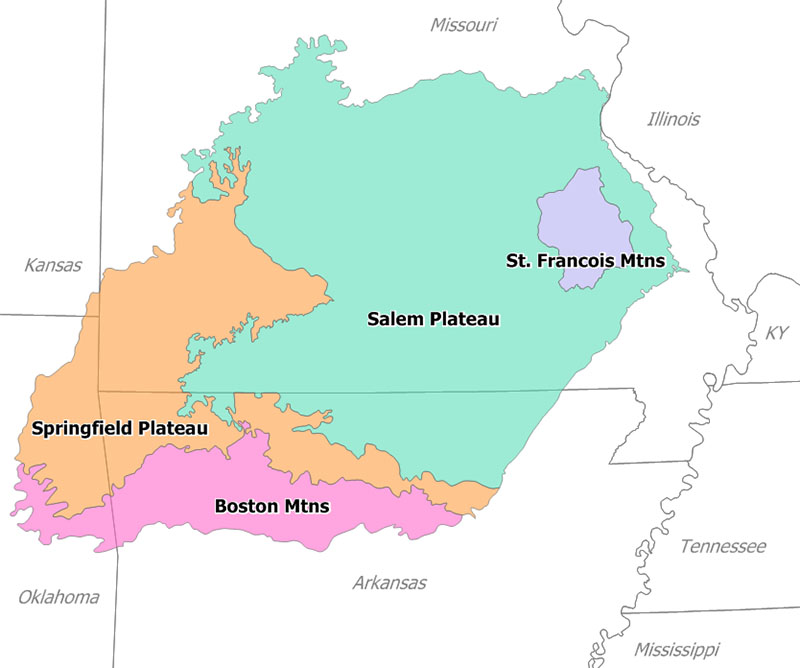
- Major sections of the Ozarks Ozarks Plateaus (17) within map of physiographic provinces in the lower 48 states
- Coordinates: 37°10′N 92°30′W
- Country: United States of America
- Counties: 90
- States: 4
- Largest city: Springfield, Missouri

Area
  - Total: 47,000 sq mi (120,000 km^{2})
- Demonym: Ozarker

The Ozarks, also known as the Ozark Mountains, Ozark Highlands or Ozark Plateau, is a geo-cultural region located in the Midwest and South Central United States. The Ozarks cover a significant portion of northern Arkansas and most of the southern half of Missouri, with small segments in Oklahoma and Kansas. Part of the Upland South, the Ozarks shares some history and culture with Appalachia and the Ouachita Mountains regions, maintaining distinction from the adjacent Deep South and Great Plains.

There are two mountain ranges in the Ozarks: the Boston Mountains of Arkansas and Oklahoma, as well as the St. Francois Mountains of Missouri. Wahzhazhe Summit (formerly known as Buffalo Lookout), is the highest point in the Ozarks at 2,561 feet (781 m), and is located in the Boston Mountains, in the westernmost part of Newton County, Arkansas, 6.2 miles (10.0 km) east of Boston, Madison County, Arkansas. Geologically, the area is a broad dome with the exposed core in the ancient St. Francois Mountains. The Ozarks cover nearly 47,000 square miles (120,000 km^{2}), making it the most extensive highland region between the Appalachians and Rockies. Together with the Ouachita Mountains, the area is known as the U.S. Interior Highlands.

The Salem Plateau, named after Salem, Missouri, makes up the largest geologic area of the Ozarks. The second largest is the Springfield Plateau, named after Springfield, Missouri, nicknamed the "Queen City of the Ozarks". On the northern Ozark border are the cities of St. Louis and Jefferson City, Missouri. Significant Ozark cities in Arkansas include Fayetteville, Springdale, Rogers, Bentonville, Harrison, Mountain Home, Batesville, and Eureka Springs. Branson, just north of the Arkansas–Missouri border, is a tourist destination where Ozark culture is popularized.

== Etymology ==
The toponym Ozarks derives from an English-language adaptation of the French abbreviation aux Arcs (short for French: aux Arcansas, meaning "of/at/to the Arkansas (Quapaw) [plural]"). In the decades prior to the French and Indian War of 1754 to 1763, aux Arkansas referred to France's trading post at Arkansas Post, located in the wooded Arkansas Delta lowland area above the confluence of the Arkansas River with the Mississippi River, outside the present-day Ozark Mountains.

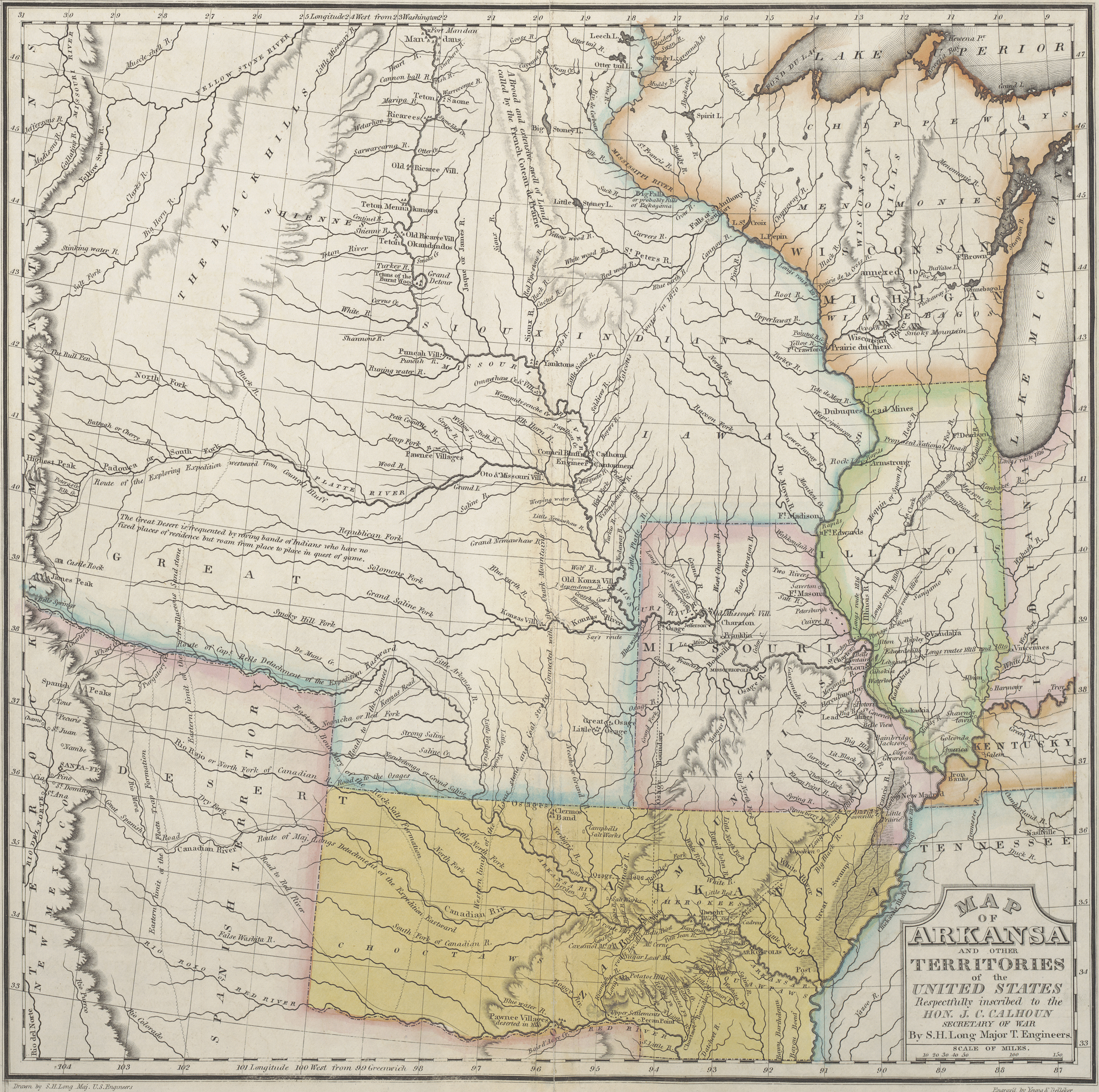
"Map of Arkansa and Other Territories of the United States" (1822) showing Ozark Mountains label reaching from Texas to St. Louis

When the Spanish took control of the region, Arkansas Post was referred to as "Spanish Ozark", with a British post located across the Mississippi River (near Concordia, Mississippi) as "British Ozark", indicating continuing use of the place name after French control ended. In 1818, Thomas Nuttall wrote that the remnants of Quapaw referred to themselves as "Osark". The highlands accessed via the Arkansas River (sometimes called the Ozark River during the period) and its tributaries were viewed as the post's hinterlands; this combined with the adoption of the name by the Quapaw who also used the area helped transfer the name Ozarks to the upland region, which had not been widely explored and did not have an established English name.

Over time, the word came to mean the highland area broadly between St. Louis and Texas (i.e., including the Ouachita Mountains and the Arkansas River Valley). Stephen Long explored the area and produced the first known map using the name "Ozark Mountains" for this region in 1822 (at right). Expedition botanist and geologist Edwin James said, "We were now at the western base of that interesting group of hills, to which we have attempted to give the name of the almost extinct tribe of Ozarks [Quapaws]." The term was adopted by explorers and other visitors to the previously lightly explored region, including Missouri Senator Lewis Linn addressing Congress in 1836, George Engelmann in 1837, Josiah Gregg in Commerce of the Prairies in 1844, and George Featherstonhaugh in 1844.

By the early 20th century, the term "Ozarks" had entered common parlance.

== Geology ==
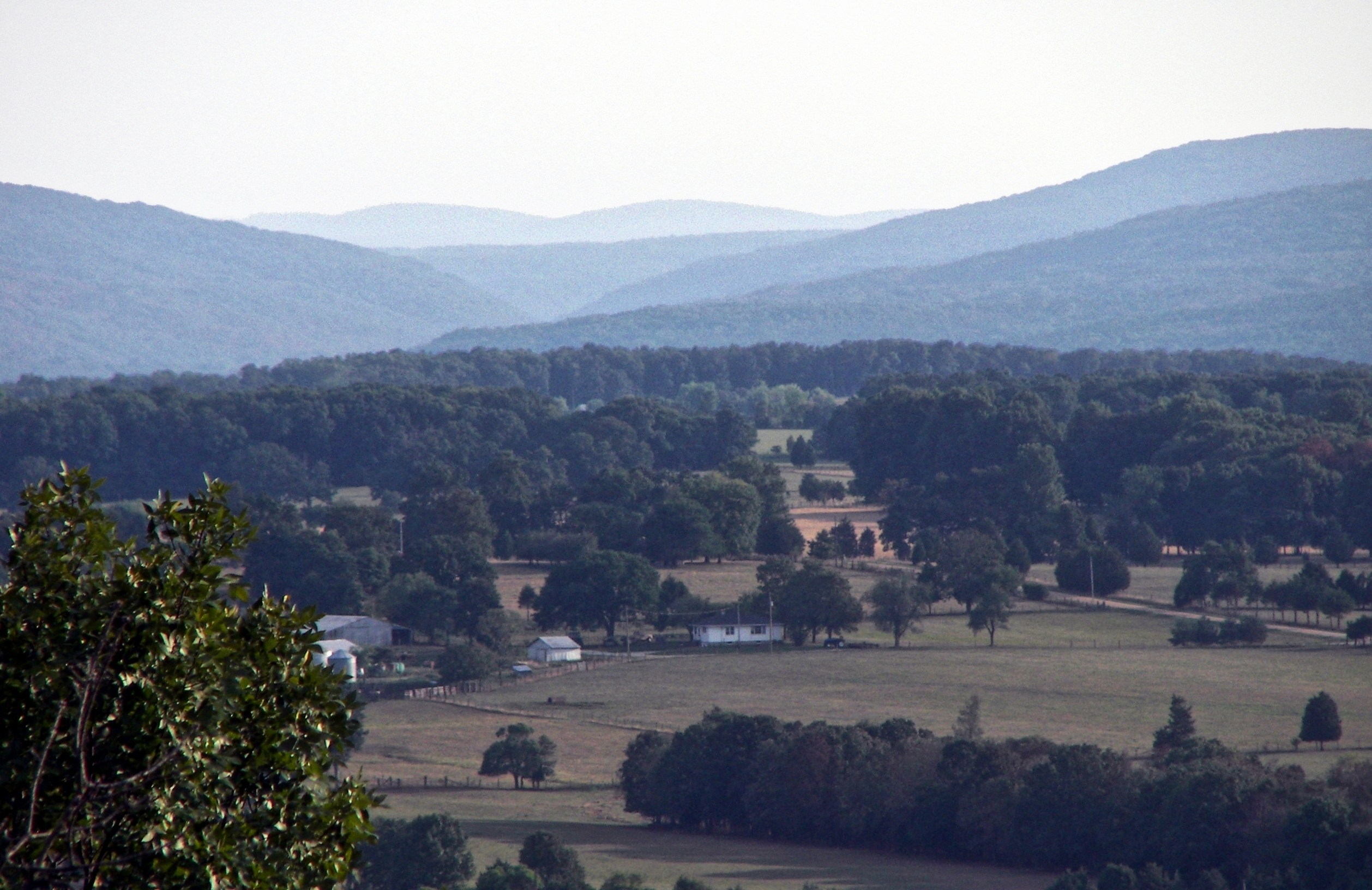
The Saint Francois Mountains, viewed from Knob Lick Mountain, are the exposed geologic core of the Ozarks.

The Ozark Plateau is a physiographic province of the United States. At 47,000 square miles (120,000 km^{2}), it is the most extensive highland region between the Appalachians and Rockies. When coupled with the Ouachita Mountains, the region is designated as the U.S. Interior Highlands physiographic region by the United States Geological Survey.

Though often called the Ozark Mountains, the region is geologically a dissected plateau of limestone and dolomite, with some shale, sandstone and chert. Only the St. Francois Mountains subrange, a mountain range of Precambrian igneous rock, are true mountains in geologic terms. The Boston Mountains of Arkansas and Oklahoma is a deeply dissected plateau with the steepest relief in the region. The remainder of the Ozarks are within two broad sections with more rolling terrain: Salem Plateau and Springfield Plateau.

== Ecology and conservation ==
Formal conservation in the region began when the Ozark National Forest was created by proclamation of President Theodore Roosevelt in 1908 to preserve 917,944 acres (3,714.79 km^{2}) across five Arkansas counties. Another 608,537 acres (2,462.66 km^{2}) were added the following year. The initial forest included area as far south as Mount Magazine and as far east as Sylamore.

In 1939, Congress established Mark Twain National Forest at nine sites in Missouri. Wildlife management areas were founded in the 1920s and 1930s to restore populations to viable numbers. In the 1930s and 1940s Aldo Leopold, Arthur Carhart and Bob Marshall developed a "wilderness" policy for the Forest Service. Their efforts bore fruit with The Wilderness Act of 1964 which designated wilderness areas "where the earth and its community of life are untrammeled by men, where man himself is a visitor and does not remain", though this included second growth public forests like the Mark Twain National Forest.

Land was also added to Ozark National Forest during this period, with over 544,000 acres (2,200 km^{2}) in total additions. Some land was reclaimed by the government through the Resettlement Administration during the Great Depression. In 1976, Congress established the Hercules Glades Wilderness, the first of 13 designated wilderness areas in the Ozarks. In 1986, Congress established the Ozark Plateau National Wildlife Refuge in northeast Oklahoma. Protected areas ensure the recovery of endangered and threatened species of animals and plants, including the red wolf, Ozark big-eared bat, Indiana bat, eastern small-footed bat, southeastern bat, southeastern big-eared bat; longnose darter, Ozark cavefish, Ozark cave crayfish, Bowman's cave amphipod, Ozark cave amphipod, bat cave isopod; and Ozark chinquapin. It is a habitat of migratory birds and contains geological, archeological, historical, and paleontological resources.

Commercial farms and processing operations are known to raise levels of chemical and biological contaminants in Ozark streams, threatening water supplies, recreational use and endangered native species.

== Lakes and streams ==
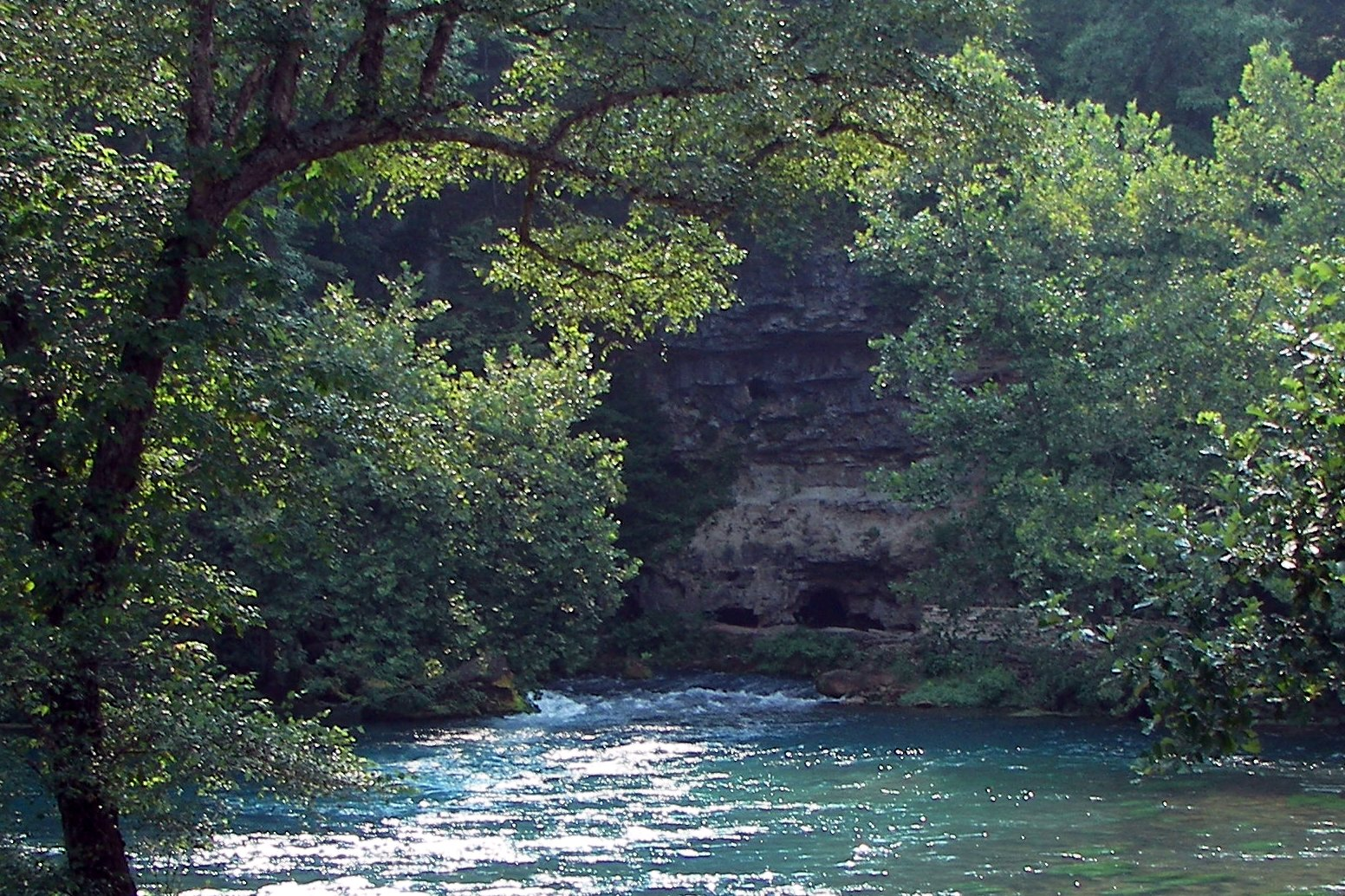
Big Spring, the largest freshwater spring in the Ozarks, discharges 304 million US gallons (1,150,000 m^{3}) of water per day into the Current River.

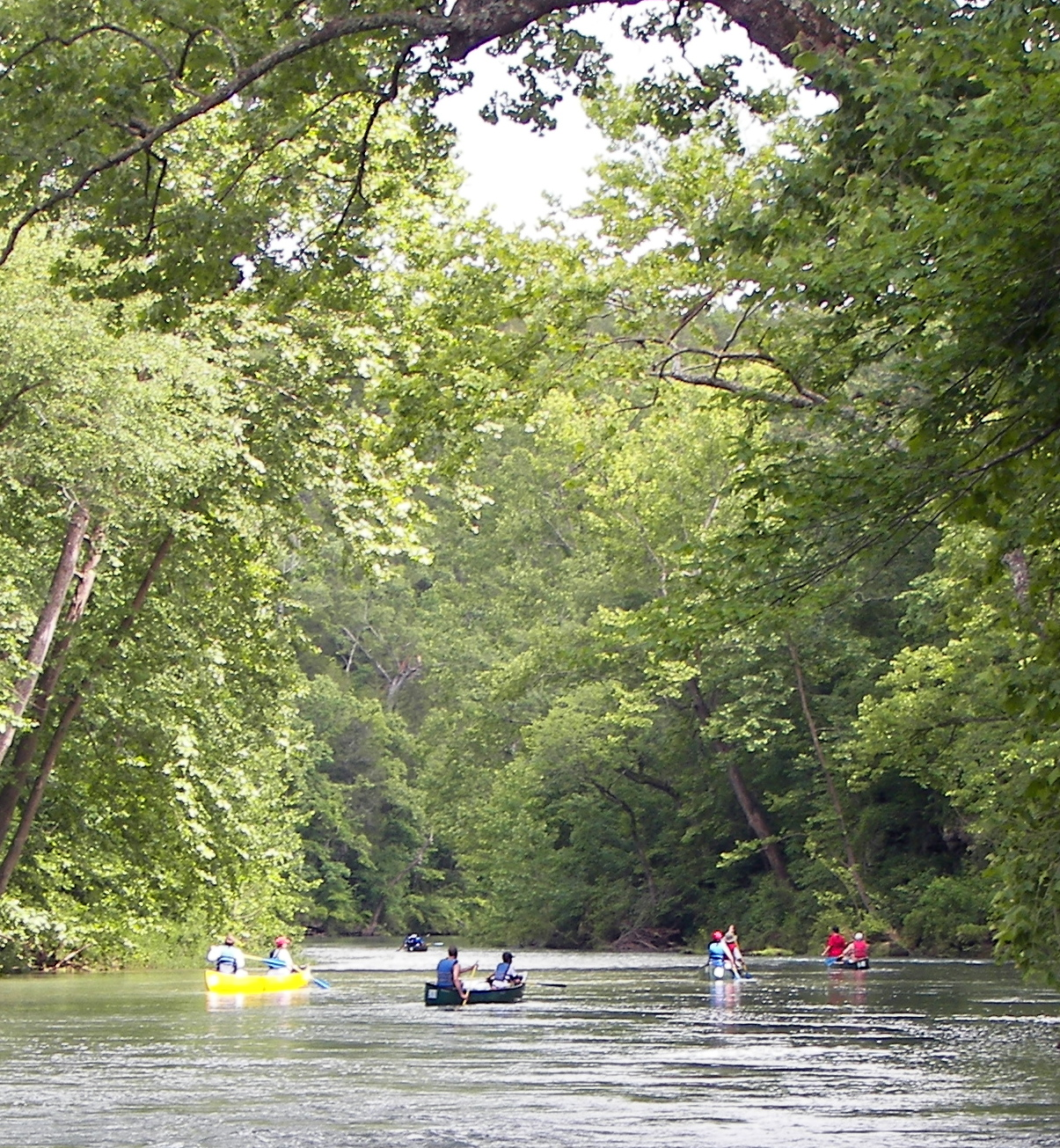
Canoers on the Current River in the Ozark National Scenic Riverways

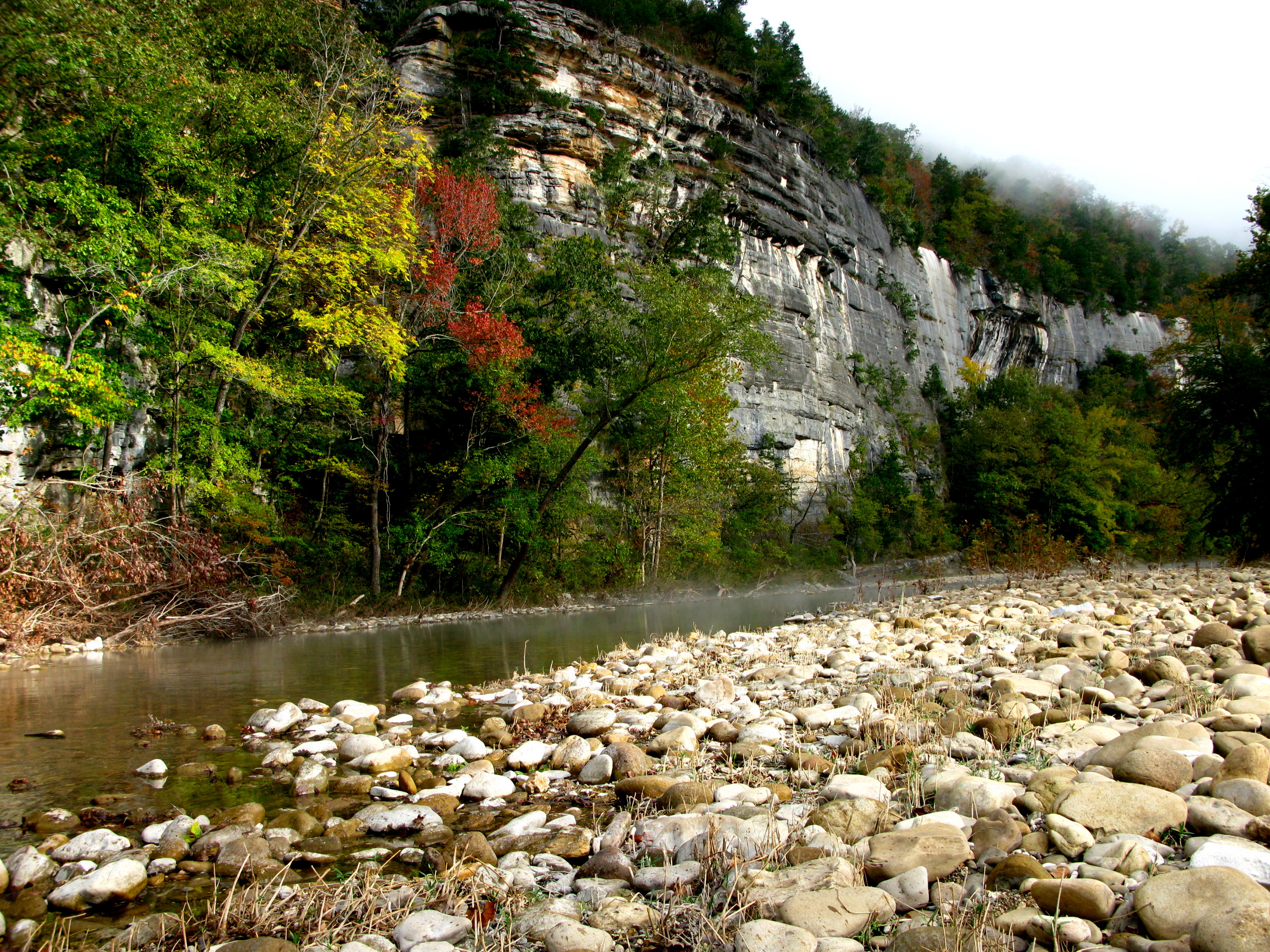
Roark Bluff on the Buffalo National River

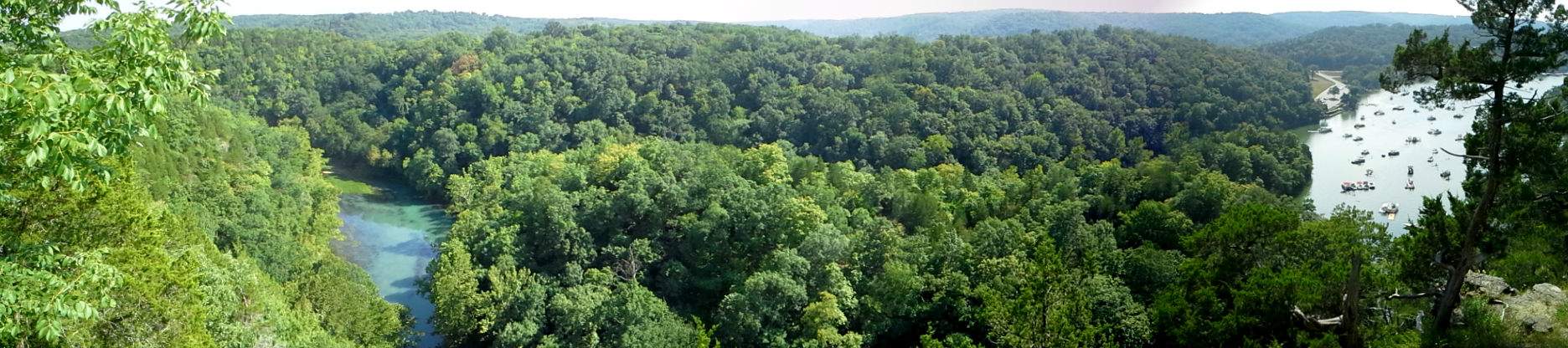
View of the Ozarks from Ha Ha Tonka State Park on Lake of the Ozarks, Camden County, Missouri

Many of the rivers and streams in the Ozarks have been dammed. Most of the dams in the region were initially built for the dual purpose of flood control and hydropower generation but have also become major economic drivers through recreational use in places such as Branson, Missouri, and Mountain Home, Arkansas.

The Army Corps of Engineers among others, operates multiple dams in the Ozarks region. Some of the largest lakes created by these dams are on the White River. Beginning in 1911 with the construction of Powersite Dam on the White River near Branson, Missouri and the impoundment of Lake Taneycomo the Ozarks rivers have been harnessed for electrical power, recreation, and flood control. After President Franklin D. Roosevelt signed the Flood Control Act of 1938, six large flood control dams were constructed on the White River and its tributaries.

- Beaver Dam on the White River – Beaver Lake
- Table Rock Dam on the White River – Table Rock Lake
- Bull Shoals Dam on the White River – Bull Shoals Lake
- Norfork Dam on the North Fork River – Norfork Lake
- Greers Ferry Lake on the Little Red River – Greers Ferry Lake
- Clearwater Dam on the Black River – Clearwater Lake

Multiple smaller lakes have been created by dams in the White River basin from 1911 through 1960. These smaller lakes include Lake Sequoyah, a small recreational fishing lake east of Fayetteville, Arkansas, formed in 1961; Sequoyah is the uppermost impoundment on the White River. Below Sequoyah (northeast of Fayetteville) is Beaver Lake, formed in 1960. The White River continues northeasterly into Table Rock Lake (1958) in Missouri, which feeds directly into Lake Taneycomo, where the river zigzags southeasterly into Arkansas forming Bull Shoals Lake along the Arkansas-Missouri line. Completed in 1952, Bull Shoals is the furthest downstream lake on the White River proper. Norfork Lake was formed by damming the North Fork River, a tributary of the White River, in 1941.

Additional large lakes in the Ozarks region include Lake of the Ozarks, Pomme de Terre Lake, and Truman Lake in the northern Ozarks. These three lakes were formed by impounding the Osage River and its tributary the Pomme de Terre River in 1931, 1961 and 1979 respectively.

Grand Lake o' the Cherokee in northeast Oklahoma, on the western portion of the Ozark Plateau, was created in 1940 with the damming of the Grand River. Stockton Lake was formed in 1969 by damming the Sac River near the city of Stockton, Missouri, and supplements the water supply of Springfield in nearby Greene County.

The creation of the lakes significantly altered the Ozark landscape and affected traditional Ozark culture through displacement. The streams provided water and power to communities, farms and mills concentrated in the valleys prior to impoundment. Many cemeteries, farm roads, river fords and railways were lost when the lakes came, disrupting rural culture, travel and commerce. Baxter County, Arkansas, alone saw nearly 400 people displaced to make way for the reservoir created by Norfork Dam. The town of Forsyth, Missouri, was relocated in its entirety to a spot 2 miles (3 km) from its previous location. Prior to damming, rivers and streams in the White and Osage River basins were of similar character to the current conditions of the Buffalo, Elk, Niangua, Gasconade, Big Piney, Current, Jacks Fork, Eleven Point and Meramec rivers.

Because of the success of the Army Corps efforts to dam the large rivers in the Ozarks, the Ozarks Society began protests to keep the other rivers in the Ozarks free flowing. The Buffalo National River was created by an Act of Congress in 1972 as the nation's first National River, administered by the National Park Service. The designation came after over a decade of battling a proposed Army Corps dam in the media, legislature, and courts to keep the Buffalo River free flowing. The Ozark Society, the main force behind the dam protest, still leads the fight to keep the Buffalo River pristine and protected. Today, the Buffalo River sees approximately 800,000 visitors camping, canoeing, floating, hiking, and tubing annually. In Missouri, the Ozark National Scenic Riverways was established in 1964 along the Current and Jacks Fork rivers as the first US national park based on a river system. The Eleven Point River is included in the National Wild and Scenic Rivers System established in 1968. These parks and rivers are a major economic driver for some of the least populated counties in Arkansas and Missouri, attracting up to 1.5 million tourists annually.

Many other waterways and streams have their headwaters in the Boston Mountains portion of the Ozarks such as the Mulberry River, the White River, War Eagle Creek, Little Mulberry Creek, Lee Creek, Big Piney Creek, and the Little Red River. To the south, the Arkansas River valley separates the Boston Mountains from the Ouachita Mountains.

Missouri Ozark rivers include the Gasconade, Big Piney, and Niangua rivers in the north central region. The Meramec River and its tributaries Huzzah Creek and Courtois Creek are found in the northeastern Ozarks. The Black and St. Francis rivers mark the eastern crescent of the Ozarks. The James, Spring and North Fork rivers are in south-central Missouri. Forming the west central border of the Ozarks from Missouri through Kansas and into Oklahoma are the Spring River and its tributary, Center Creek. Grand Falls, Missouri's largest natural waterfall, a chert outcropping, includes bluffs and glades on Shoal Creek south of Joplin. All these river systems see heavy recreational use in season, including the Elk River in southwestern Missouri and its tributary Big Sugar Creek.

Ozark rivers and streams are typically clear water, with baseflows sustained by many seeps and springs, and flow through forests along limestone and dolomite bluffs. Gravel bars are common along shallow banks, while deep holes are found along bluffs. Except during periods of heavy rain or snow melt — when water levels rise quite rapidly — their level of difficulty is suitable for most canoeing and tubing.

Fish hatcheries are common due to the abundance of springs and waterways. The Neosho National Fish Hatchery was built in 1888; it was the first federal hatchery. The Arkansas Game and Fish Commission, Missouri Department of Conservation and U.S. Fish and Wildlife Service operate numerous warm and cold water hatcheries and trout parks; private hatcheries such as at Rockbridge are found throughout the region.

== Regional economy ==
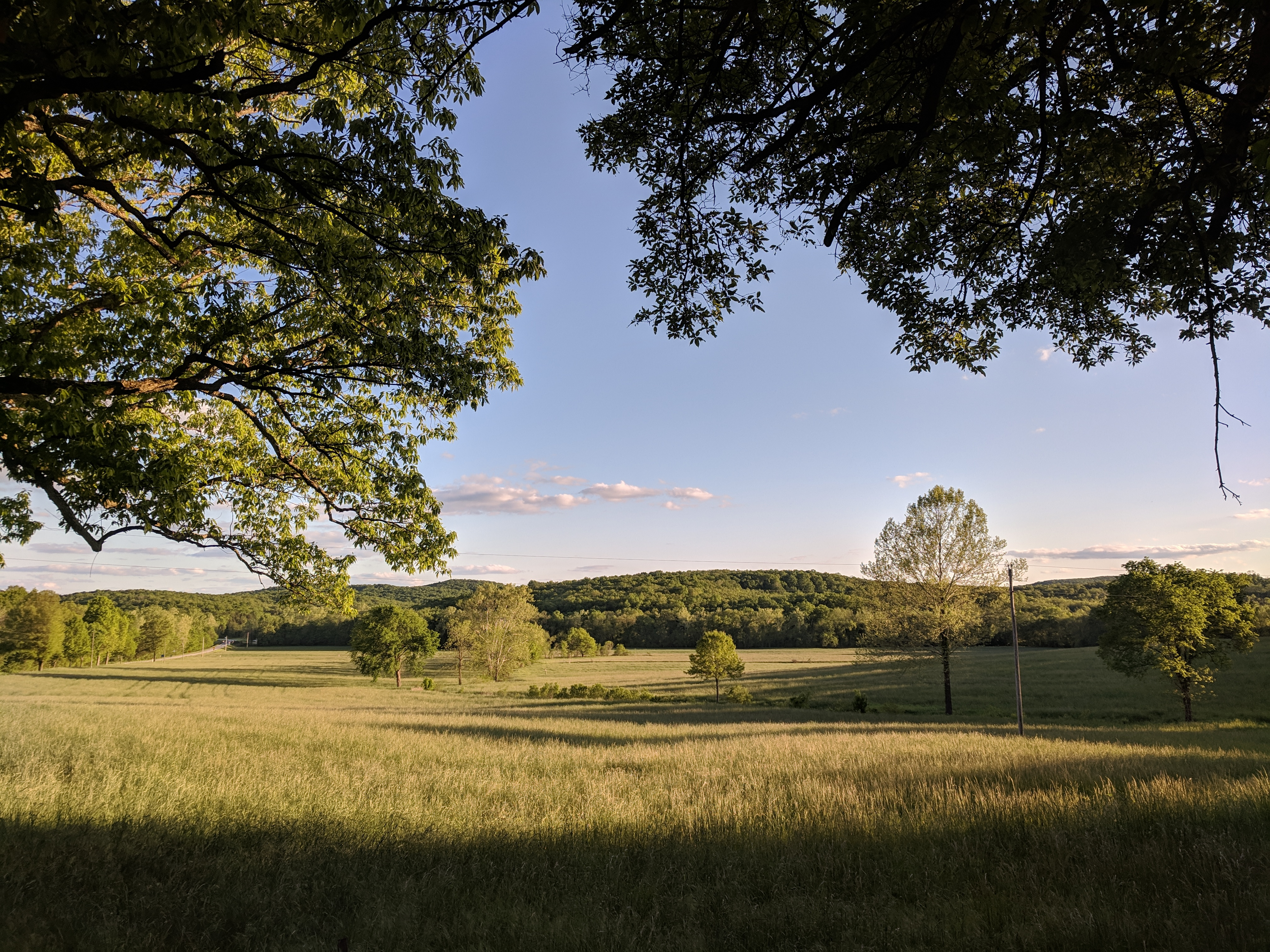
A rural Ozarks scene. Phelps County, Missouri

=== Traditional economic activity ===
Following Indian removal in the Ozarks, white settlement was slow due to transportation and isolation challenges in the region. Migration to Arkansas through 1850 was predominantly from four nearby states: Tennessee, Alabama, Missouri and Mississippi accounting for a total of 74% of white family migration. These settlers generally eschewed the lowlands of east Arkansas for the uplands of the Ozarks and Ouachitas, seeking familiar topography and climate to establish small subsistence farms on prairies and wooded hills, as well as in the Arkansas River Valley. Settlers initially arrived from transportation routes in the Arkansas River Valley to the south and accessed the region along waterways such as Big Piney Creek, Mulberry River and White River, generally establishing isolated settlements along these waterways. By 1844, settlements had reached higher Ozark plateaus where soil was thin and poor. However, transportation remained difficult, trading posts were often distant, and few crops grew on the thin soil with sufficient value to make the journey to market worthwhile.

The majority of the Ozarks is forested. Oak-hickory is the predominant type; eastern junipers are common, with stands of pine often seen in the southern range. Less than a quarter of the region has been cleared for pasture and cropland. Forests that were heavily logged during the early-to-mid-20th century have recovered; much of the remaining timber in the Ozarks is second-growth forest. However, deforestation of frontier forest contributed through erosion to increased gravel bars along Ozark waterways in logged areas; stream channels have become wider and shallower, and deepwater fish habitat has been lost.

The numerous rivers and streams of the region saw hundreds of water-powered timber and grist mills. Mills were important centers of culture and commerce; dispersed widely throughout the region, mills served local needs, often thriving within a few miles of another facility. Few Ozark mills relied on inefficient water wheels for power; most utilized a dam, millrace and water turbine.

Parts of the Ozarks contain ore deposits of lead, zinc, iron and barite. Many of these deposits have been depleted by historic mining activities, but much remains and is currently being mined in the Lead Belt of southeastern Missouri. Historically, the lead belt around the Saint Francois Mountains and the Tri-State district lead-zinc mining area around Joplin, Missouri, have been important sources of metals. Mining practices common in the early 20th century left significant abandoned underground mine problems and heavy metal contamination in topsoil and groundwater in the Tri-State district.

Much of the area supports beef cattle ranching, and dairy farming is common across the area. Dairy farms are usually cooperative affairs, with small farms selling to a corporate wholesaler, who packages product under a common brand for retail sales. Petroleum exploration and extraction also takes place in the Oklahoma portion of the Ozarks, as well as in the east half of the Boston Mountains in Arkansas. Logging of both softwood and hardwood timber species on both private land and in the National Forests has long been an important economic activity.

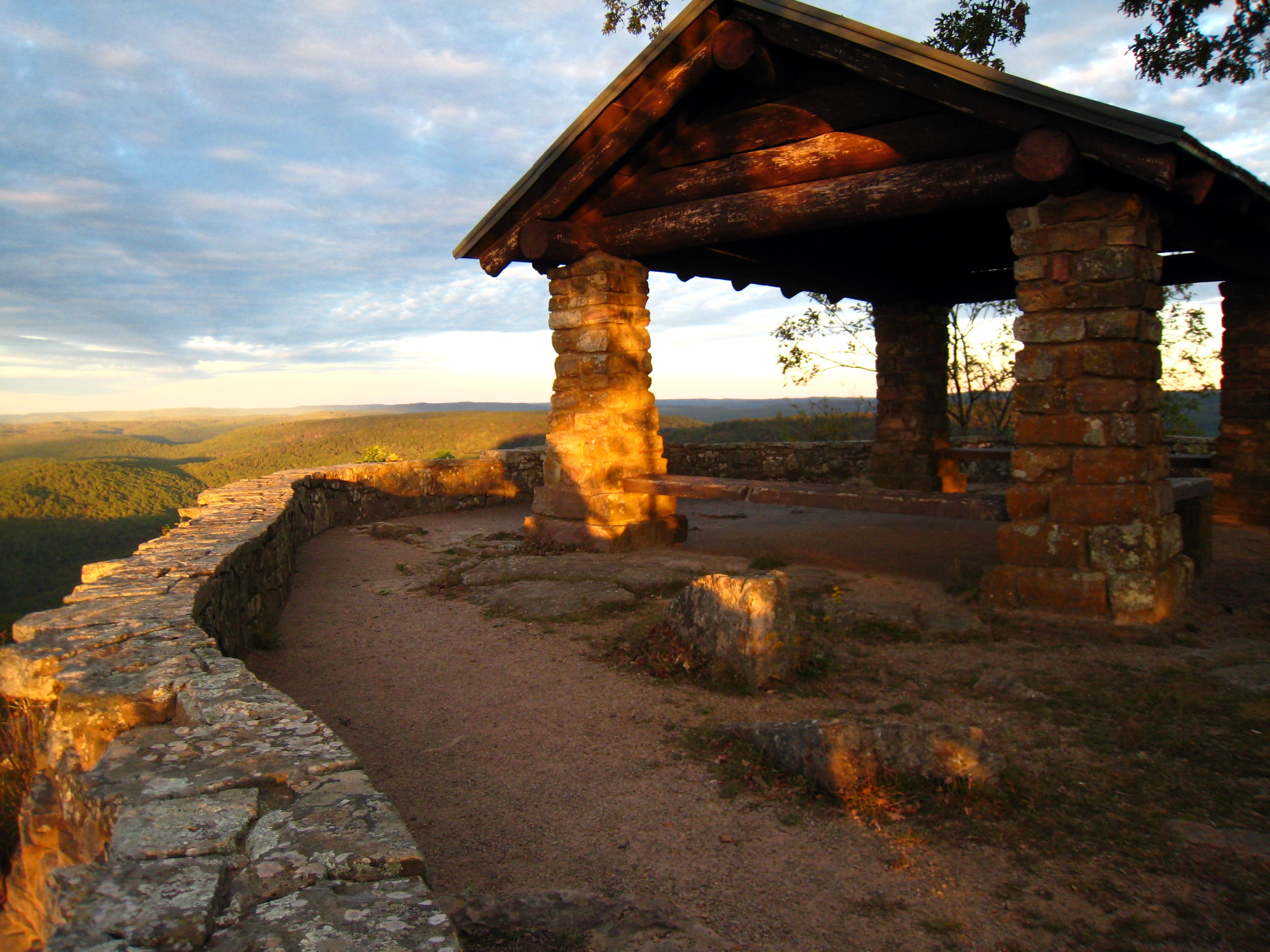
CCC lookout on White Rock Mountain, Franklin County, Arkansas

During the New Deal, the Civilian Conservation Corps employed hundreds in the construction of nearly 400 fire lookouts throughout the Ozarks at 121 known sites in Arkansas and 257 in Missouri. Of those lookouts, about half remain, and many of them are in use by the U.S. Forest Service. A 2007 report by the National Trust for Historic Preservation deemed these fire lookouts and related structures as one of America's 11 Most Endangered Historic Places.

In the 1960s, federal activity promoted modernization, especially through better transportation and tourism. The Ozarks Regional Commission sponsored numerous projects.

=== Current economic activities ===
Tourism is the growth industry of the Ozarks as evidenced by the growth of the Branson, Missouri, entertainment center celebrating traditional Ozark culture. The rapidly growing Northwest Arkansas metropolitan area has also become a tourist hub, drawing nationwide attention for the Crystal Bridges Museum of American Art in Bentonville, Arkansas.

Poultry farming and food processing are significant industries throughout the region. The Tyson Foods corporation and ConAgra Foods each operates several hundred poultry farms and processing plants throughout the Ozarks. Schreiber Foods has operations throughout southern Missouri.

The trucking industry is important to the regional economy, with national carriers based there including J. B. Hunt, ABF, and Prime, Inc. Springfield remains an operational hub for the BNSF Railway. Logging and timber industries are also significant in the Ozark economy, with operations ranging from small family-run sawmills to large commercial concerns. Fortune 500 companies such as Wal-Mart, Leggett & Platt, Bass Pro Shops, and O'Reilly Auto Parts are based in the Ozarks.

The area is home to several Missouri wine and spirit regions, including the Ozark Highlands and Ozark Mountain American Viticultural Areas, and the Ozark Highland Spirits Region. There are a number of microbreweries throughout the region.

== Cities ==
The table below includes metropolitan statistical areas and micropolitan statistical areas (MSAs) per the 2020 census which include one or more Ozark counties in their United States Census Bureau definition. Ozark counties are as defined as containing any part of the Ozark Plateaus physiographic province by the United States Geological Survey (USGS, see map). For example, the entire Greater St. Louis metro population is included by virtue of the exurban Crawford County, Missouri and Franklin County, Missouri, which are wholly within the Ozark Plateaus province, as are Ozark border counties partially located on the province: Jefferson County, Missouri, St. Charles County, Missouri, St. Louis County, Missouri, and Warren County, Missouri. As a result of the methodology, this table overestimates the population considered to be included in the Ozarks.

The core-based statistical areas of the Ozarks
2025 rank	Core-based statistical area	Population				
2025 rank	Core-based statistical area	2025 estimate	Change	2020 Census	Change	2010 Census
1	St. Louis, MO-IL MSA	2,814,421	−0.21%	2,820,253	+1.17%	2,787,701
2	Fayetteville-Springdale-Rogers, AR MSA	622,177	+13.80%	546,725	+24.22%	440,121
3	Springfield, MO MSA	500,694	+5.31%	475,432	+8.87%	436,712
4	Fort Smith, AR-OK MSA	234,140	+3.05%	227,213	−1.25%	230,083
5	Columbia, MO MSA	219,062	+3.89%	210,864	+10.76%	190,387
6	Joplin, MO-KS MSA	208,796	+4.00%	200,771	+1.85%	197,121
7	Jefferson City, MO MSA	152,712	+1.60%	150,309	+0.34%	149,807
8	Cape Girardeau, MO-IL MSA	99,215	+1.74%	97,517	+1.29%	96,275
9	Russellville, AR μSA	84,932	+1.54%	83,644	−0.35%	83,939
10	Farmington, MO μSA	67,809	+1.33%	66,922	+2.39%	65,359
11	Branson, MO μSA	57,001	+1.67%	56,066	+8.50%	51,675
12	Fort Leonard Wood, MO μSA	54,442	+0.90%	53,955	+3.22%	52,274
13	Tahlequah, OK μSA	49,196	+4.50%	47,078	+0.19%	46,987
14	Harrison, AR μSA	45,654	+2.37%	44,598	−1.40%	45,233
15	Rolla, MO μSA	45,247	+1.36%	44,638	−1.15%	45,156
16	Sedalia, MO μSA	44,254	+2.96%	42,980	+1.85%	42,201
17	Mountain Home, AR μSA	42,982	+3.26%	41,627	+0.27%	41,513
18	Poplar Bluff, MO μSA	41,904	−0.54%	42,130	−1.55%	42,794
19	West Plains, MO μSA	40,798	+2.64%	39,750	−1.61%	40,400
20	Batesville, AR μSA	38,785	+2.23%	37,938	+3.52%	36,647
21	Lebanon, MO μSA	36,943	+2.51%	36,039	+1.32%	35,571
22	Miami, OK μSA	30,438	+0.51%	30,285	−4.91%	31,848

Legend:

Contains counties not included in the Ozarks

== Culture ==
The term Ozark also refers to the distinctive culture, architecture, and dialect shared by the residents of the plateau. Early settlers in Missouri were pioneers who came west from the Southern Appalachians at the beginning of the 19th century, followed in the 1840s and 1850s by Irish and German immigrants. Much of the Ozark population is of English, Scots-Irish, and German descent, and the Ozark families from which the regional culture derived tend to have lived in the area since the 19th century.

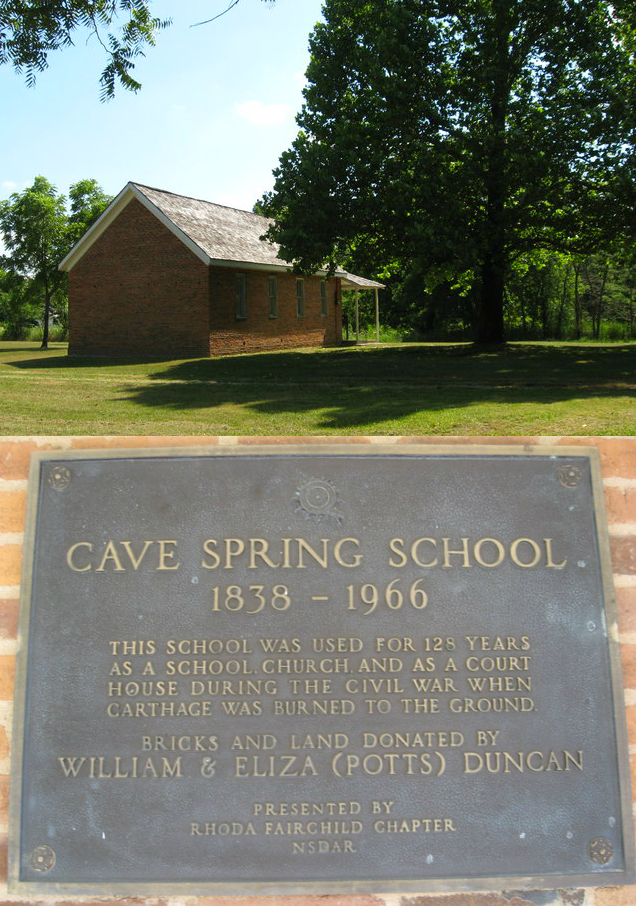
The first public school in Jasper County, Missouri

Early settlers relied on hunting, fishing, trapping, and foraging to supplement their diets and incomes. Today hunting and fishing for recreation are common activities and an important part of the tourist industry. Foraging for mushrooms (especially morels) and for ginseng is common and financially supported by established buyers in the area. Other forages include poke, watercress, persimmons, and pawpaw; wild berries such as blackberry, black raspberry, raspberry, red mulberry, black cherry, wild strawberry, and dewberry; and wild nuts such as black walnut and even acorns. Edible native legumes, wild grasses and wildflowers are plentiful, and beekeeping is common.

Print and broadcast media have explored Ozark culture broadly. Books set in the Ozarks include Where the Red Fern Grows, The Shepherd of the Hills, and As a Friend. The 1999 film Ride with the Devil, based on the book Woe to Live On, depicts conflict in southwest Missouri during the Civil War. Winter's Bone, a novel by Daniel Woodrell (author of Woe to Live On), reflects on contemporary methamphetamine culture and its impact on families on the plateau. Released as a feature film in 2010, Winter's Bone received the Grand Jury Prize at the Sundance Film Festival, as well as other awards. Several early and influential country-music television and radio programs originated from Springfield in the 1950s and '60s, including ABC-TV's Ozark Jubilee and The Slim Wilson Show on KYTV. The Clampett clan of The Beverly Hillbillies TV show provide a stereotypical depiction of Ozark people. Ozark musicians include Porter Wagoner and old-time fiddler Bob Holt. Netflix drama series Ozark takes place in Osage Beach, Missouri and revolves around the well-to-do Byrde family as their lives are uprooted and they are forced to move from Chicago to the Ozarks after a money laundering scheme goes wrong. The series focuses on the Byrdes' dealings in the Ozarks, as well as their interactions with local Ozark crime families. The series premiered on July 21, 2017.

Examples of commercial interpretations of traditional Ozark culture include the two major family theme parks in the region, Silver Dollar City and the now defunct Dogpatch USA, and the resort entertainment complex in Branson. Ozark Folkways in Winslow, Arkansas, and Ozark Folk Center State Park in Mountain View, Arkansas, interpret regional culture through musical performance and exhibitions of pioneer skills and crafts.

Traditional Ozark culture includes stories and tunes passed orally between generations through community music parties and other informal gatherings. Many of these tunes and tales can be traced to British origins and to German folklore. Moreover, historian Vance Randolph attributes the formation of much Ozark lore to individual families when "backwoods parents begin by telling outrageous whoppers to their children and end by half believing the wildest of these tales themselves." Randolph collected Ozark folklore and lyrics in volumes such as the national bestseller Pissing in the Snow and Other Ozark Folktales (University of Illinois Press, 1976), Ozark Folksongs (University of Missouri Press, 1980), a four-volume anthology of regional songs and ballads collected in the 1920s and 1930s, and Ozark Magic and Folklore (Courier Dover Publications, 1964). Evidenced by Randolph's extensive field work, many Ozark anecdotes from the oral tradition are often bawdy, full of wild embellishments on everyday themes. In 1941–42, commissioned by Alan Lomax of the Archive of Folk Culture, Randolph returned to the Ozarks with a portable recording machine from the Library of Congress and captured over 800 songs, ballads and instrumentals. Selected from among these several hundred recordings, 35 tracks were released on Various Artists: Ozark Folksongs (Rounder Records) in 2001.

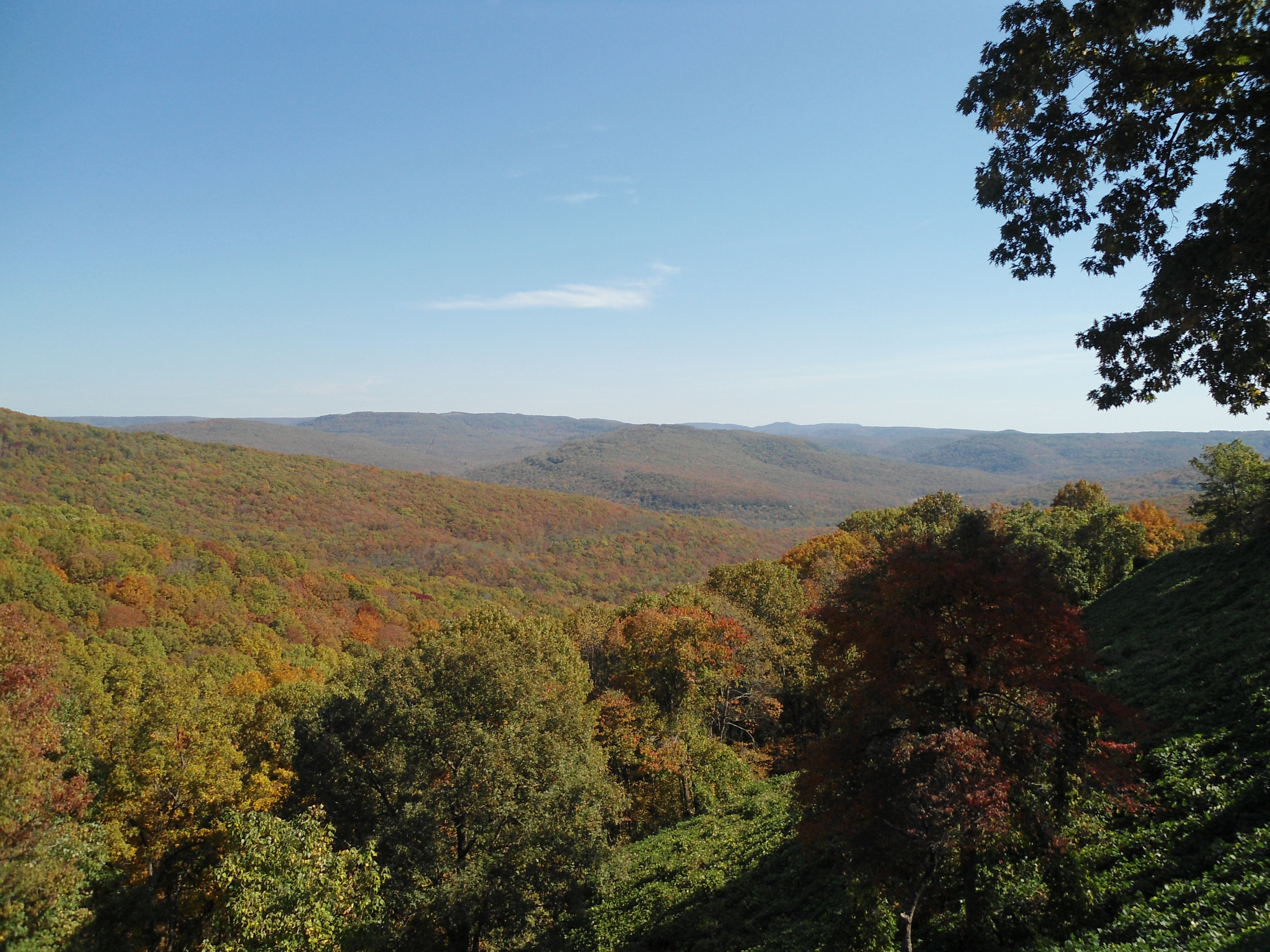
Artist's Point, located along the Boston Mountains Scenic Loop in Crawford County, Arkansas

Square dances were an important social avenue throughout the Ozarks into the 20th century. Square dances sprang up wherever people concentrated around mills and timber camps, springs, fords, and in towns small and large. Geographically isolated communities saw their own local dance tunes and variations develop. Of all the traditional musicians in the Ozarks, the fiddler holds a distinct place in both the community and folklore. Community fiddlers were revered for carrying local tunes; regionally, traveling fiddlers brought new tunes and entertainment, even while many viewed their arrival as a threat to morality. In 2007, Gordon McCann, a chronicler of Ozarks folklife and fiddle music for over four decades, donated a collection of audio recordings, fieldnotes and photographs to Missouri State University in Springfield. The collection includes more than 3,000 hours of fiddle music and interviews recorded at jam sessions, music parties, concerts and dances in the Ozarks. Selected audio recordings along with biographical sketches, photographs and tune histories were published in Drew Beisswenger and Gordon McCann's 2008 book/37-track CD set Mel Bay Presents Ozarks Fiddle Music: 308 Tunes Featuring 30 Legendary Fiddlers With Selections from 50 Other Great Ozarks Fiddlers.

In the 2024 Missouri Amendment 3, counties in the Ozarks voted strongly against legal abortion.

From 1973 to 1983, the Bittersweet project, which began as an English class at Lebanon High School in Missouri, collected 476 taped and transcribed interviews, published 482 stories, and took over 50,000 photographs documenting traditional Ozark culture.

Population influx since the 1950s, coupled with geographically lying in both the Midwest and Upper South, proximity to the Mississippi embayment, the Osage and Northern Plains, contributes to changing cultural values in the Ozarks. Theme parks and theatres seen to reflect regional values have little in common with traditional Ozark culture. Community tradition bearers remain active, in decreasing numbers, far afield of commercial offers.

=== Religion ===
Ozark religion, like that of Appalachia, was predominantly Baptist and Methodist during periods of early settlement; it tends to the conservative or individualistic, with Episcopalians, Assemblies of God, Baptists including Southern Baptists, Church of Christ, Pentecostals, and other Protestant denominations present, as well as Catholics. Religious organizations headquartered in the Ozarks include the Assemblies of God and Baptist Bible Fellowship International in Springfield and the General Association of General Baptists in Poplar Bluff.

== See also ==
- Pre-Columbian history of Ozarks

National Forests of the Ozarks

- Mark Twain National Forest – United States historic center
- Ozark–St. Francis National Forest – United States National Forest located in the state of Arkansas

Ozark National Rivers and Wild Scenic Riverways

- Buffalo National River
- Ozark National Scenic Riverways – National recreational area in the Ozark, Missouri, USA
- Eleven Point National Wild and Scenic River – National scenic river in the Ozarks of Missouri, USA

Hiking Trail Systems of the Ozarks

- Ozark Trail – Multi-use trail in Missouri and Arkansas, United States
- Ozark Highlands Trail – Trail in Arkansas, U.S.
U.S. Wilderness Areas in the Ozarks
  - Bell Mountain Wilderness – Protected area in Missouri, US
  - Devils Backbone Wilderness – Wilderness area in Missouri, United States
  - Hercules Glades Wilderness – Wilderness area in Missouri
  - Irish Wilderness – Wilderness in Missouri, United States
  - Leatherwood Wilderness – Wilderness area
  - Paddy Creek Wilderness – Wilderness area in Missouri, United States
  - Piney Creek Wilderness – Wilderness area in Missouri, United States
  - Richland Creek Wilderness – Wilderness area in Arkansas, United States
  - Rockpile Mountain Wilderness – Wilderness area in Missouri, United States
  - Upper Buffalo Wilderness – Protected area in Arkansas, United States
- Ozark Highlands (ecoregion) – Level III ecoregion in four U.S. states
- List of U.S. multistate regions
- Missouri Ozark Forest Ecosystem Project – Ecological organization in Missouri, USA
- The Old Ozark Auto Trail – Former highway network in the south-central U.S.
- Green Country – Area of Oklahoma, US
- Cookson Hills – Hills in Oklahoma, United States
- Carthage Underground – Mine in the United States of America

Ships named Ozark

- USS Ozark (1863) – American river monitor
- USS Ozark (BM-7) – U.S. Navy ship built launched in 1900
- USS Ozark (LSV-2) – WW II warship
