= Nichols Farm District =

Historic district in Missouri, United States

- U.S. National Register of Historic Places
- U.S. Historic district
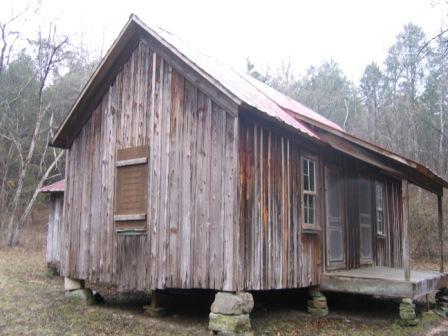
- Nichols Cabin, March 2006

- Location within Missouri Location within the United States
- Location: West of County Road V, north of the Current River, near Cedar Grove, Missouri
- Coordinates: 37.441944°N 91.620278°W
- Area: 3.6 acres (1.5 ha)
- Built: c. 1910
- Built by: Nichols, John
- NRHP reference No.: 89002129
- Added to NRHP: December 27, 1989

Nichols Farm District, also known as the Susie Nichols Cabin site, is a historic farm and national historic district located near Cedar Grove, Dent County, Missouri. The district encompasses a house (c. 1910), barn, corn crib, associated landscape features, and refuse dump. It is representative of a late-19th and early-20th century Ozark farmstead.

It was added to the National Register of Historic Places in 1989.
