= Pre-Columbian history of Ozarks =

People first arrived in the Ozarks sometime between the 11th millennium BC and the 8th millennium BC. The population began to grow in the region during the Dalton period.

== Paleo-Indians ==
The first people in the Ozarks arrived in the region sometime between the 11th millennium BC and the 8th millennium BC. These people were nomadic and small in numbers. They were hunter and gathers, they gathered nuts and berries and used stone tools to hunt whitetail deer, smaller animals, and at times larger animals like mastodon.

== Dalton period ==
According to historian Brooks Blevins, during the Dalton period, the population in the Ozarks likely began to increase. Blevins also says that during this time the people might have increased their activities in gathering, especially for walnuts and hickory nuts. However, their diet mainly relied on whitetail deer meat which eventually got replaced by the consumption of raccoons, beavers, rabbits, squirrels, turtles, fish, and birds.

The Dalton period also shown material culture such as adz and tools for grinding plants. They also had societal advancements such as trade and burials for the dead.

== Archaic period ==
The Early Archaic people in the Ozarks had no pottery, no bow and arrow, and no agriculture. But during this time there was an increase in weapons and tools used for hunting, harvesting, and processing raw materials; this included projectile points such as the Rice Lobed and the Rice Contracting Stemmed projectile. Like previous periods the people in the Ozarks during this time were primarily hunters and foragers; their hunting methods include hunting with a spear or a atlatl with a notched projectile point at the end, they also fished and collected food from the nearby woods. These people camped near spots where these elements were present, sometimes all three were present in a single spot. Sometimes they made seasonal trips for hunting and gathering and other times they would spend the winter in one spot and then move to another spot in the spring. However, long distant travels were usually unnecessary for these people.

During the later part of this period, projectile points such as the Afton dart point and Table rock stemmed appeared in the Ozarks.

== Woodland period ==
During this period, trade networks increased causing the natives of the Ozarks to have better connections with people from as far as the Rocky Mountains to the Gulf of Mexico.
