= Missouri Ozark Forest Ecosystem Project =

Ecological organization in Missouri, USA

- Formation: 1991
- Location: Missouri
- Key people: Missouri Department of Conservation; U.S. Forest Service; University of Missouri; Missouri Department of Natural Resources; Faculty and staff from other Missouri universities
- Website: mofep.mdc.mo.gov

The Missouri Ozark Forest Ecosystem Project (MOFEP) is a century-long ecological experiment to assess logging practices in the Missouri Ozark forest. Its goal is to find out a logging method that best balances the demand for wood products with forest preservation. Researchers from the Missouri Department of Conservation, the U.S. Forest Service, and Missouri universities are participating in the project.

The project uses 9,000 acres (36 km^{2}) of state forest land as experimental tracts. That land is divided into nine compartments. One group of three compartments is a control group and experiences no logging. The second group is logged in an "even-aged" manner, with swaths comprising ten percent of each compartment logged every ten years. The third group is logged in an "uneven-aged" manner, with selective logging of trees throughout the three compartments in that group. The uneven-aged management style creates a forest with trees of various ages and sizes. In the two groups that are cut, 10% of trees are left uncut, to preserve them as old growth forest. In both groups, researchers expect all tracts of cut forest to regenerate by the end of the project. The uncut control group, of course, remains unaffected.

The project has spawned twelve studies to assess the flora and fauna of the forest as it reacts to various logging methods. Although the project only started in 1995, researchers have already released some preliminary results of the study. The project's expected completion date is 2095.
