= W.A. Young House =

Historic house in Missouri, United States

- W. A. Young House
- U.S. National Register of Historic Places
- Location within Missouri Location within the United States
- Location: County Road 513, near Salem, Missouri
- Coordinates: 37.61722°N 91.45637°W
- Area: 2 acres (0.81 ha)
- Built: c. 1871
- Built by: Dye, A.E.; Dye, E.
- Architectural style: Late Victorian, Folk Victorian
- NRHP reference No.: 88000147
- Added to NRHP: March 30, 1989

W. A. Young House, also known as the Young Place, is a historic home located near Salem, Dent County, Missouri. It was built about 1871, and is an eclectic cruciform plan Late Victorian dwelling. It features a Greek Revival style interior woodwork and 34 large, symmetrically arranged windows.

It was listed on the National Register of Historic Places in 1989.
