= Salem, Missouri =

- City
- City of Salem
- Location of Salem, Missouri
- Coordinates: 37°38′24″N 91°32′05″W
- Country: United States
- State: Missouri
- County: Dent
- Township: Spring Creek East, Spring Creek West

Government
  - Type: Mayor–council government
  - Mayor: Greg Parker

Area
  - Total: 3.48 sq mi (9.01 km^{2})
  - Land: 3.48 sq mi (9.01 km^{2})
  - Water: 0 sq mi (0.00 km^{2})
- Elevation: 1,168 ft (356 m)

Population (2020)
  - Total: 4,608
  - Density: 1,324.5/sq mi (511.41/km^{2})
- Time zone: UTC-6 (Central (CST))
  - Summer (DST): UTC-5 (CDT)
- ZIP code: 65560
- Area code: 573
- FIPS code: 29-65234
- GNIS feature ID: 2396528
- Website: https://www.salemmo.com/

Salem is a city in and the county seat of Dent County, Missouri, United States. The population was 4,608 at the 2020 census, which allows Salem to become a Class 3 city in Missouri; however, the city has chosen to remain a Class 4 city under Missouri Revised Statutes. Salem is located a few miles north of the Ozark Scenic Riverways and close to Montauk State Park, which contains the headwaters of the Current River.

The name Salem is derived from the Hebrew word Shalom, meaning "peace".

== History ==
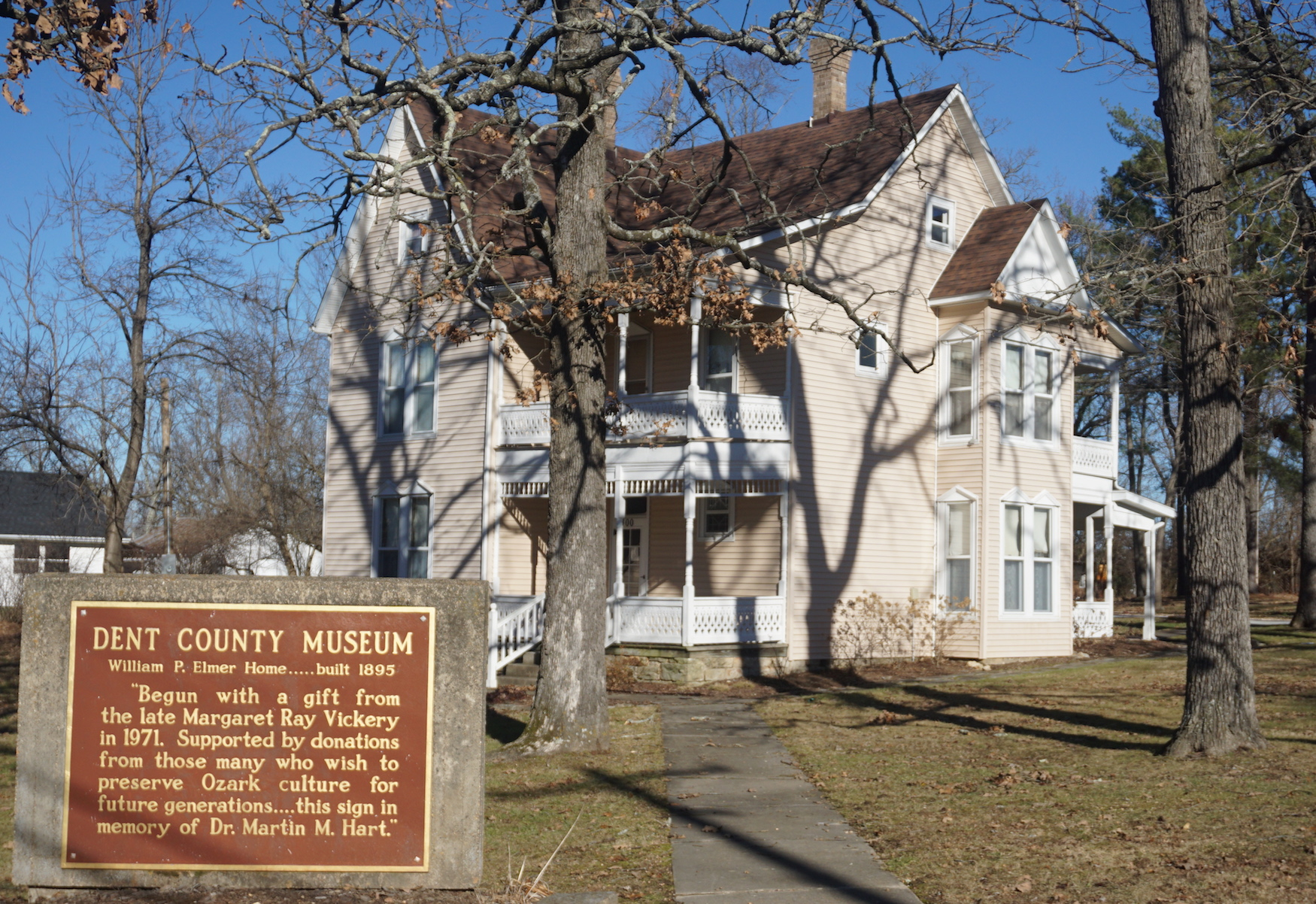
Dent County Museum (former home of W. P. Elmer)

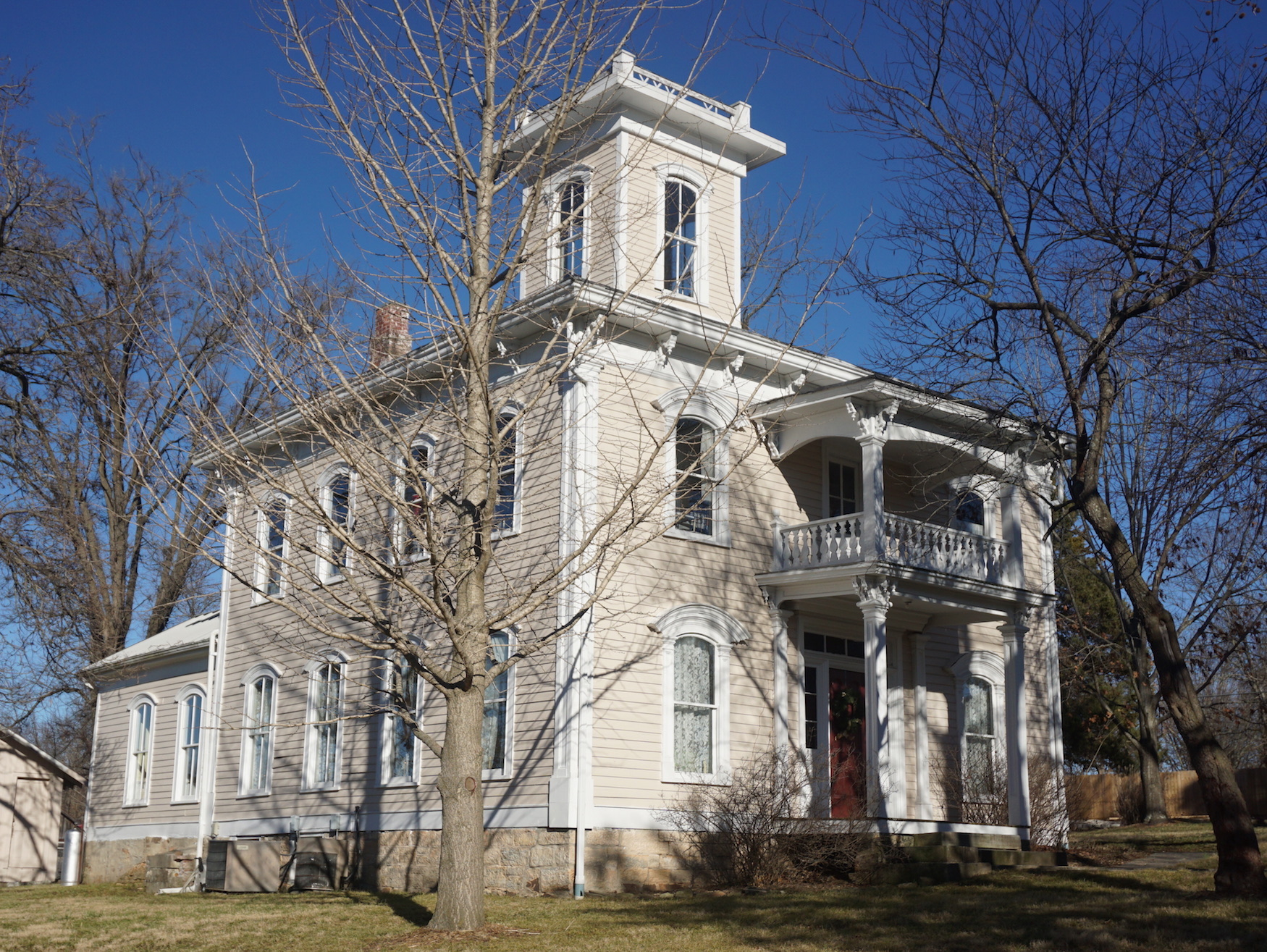
Bonebrake Center of Nature and History

Dent County was first explored by Dustin Counts and settled between 1818 and 1829. In 1851, the Missouri Assembly created Dent County from portions of Crawford Shannon and Texas counties. It was named for early settler Lewis Dent, who served as the first representative. A log courthouse, built c. 1851–1852, was Dent County's first and was located on the Wingfield farm northeast of Salem. W. P. Williams became the first mayor of Salem in 1860, just after the Missouri State Legislature passed laws regarding the administration of village government. During the American Civil War, units of the 5th Missouri State Militia would sometimes garrison in Salem. Village governments were suspended during the Civil War. In 1881, Salem was incorporated as a town.

The town's museums include the Dent County Museum, the Ozark Natural & Cultural Resource Center, the Bonebrake Center of Nature and History, and a historic Downtown Walking Tour.

The Dam and Spillway in the Hatchery Area at Montauk State Park, Dent County Courthouse, Lower Parker School, Montauk State Park Open Shelter, Nova Scotia Ironworks Historic District, Old Mill at Montauk State Park, and W.A. Young House are listed on the National Register of Historic Places.

== Geography ==
According to the United States Census Bureau, the city has a total area of 3.18 square miles (8.24 km^{2}), all land.

=== Climate ===
Salem has a humid subtropical climate (Köppen climate classification Cfa). It has cool winters and warm summers with consistent rainfall year-round.

Climate data for Salem, Missouri (1991–2020 normals, extremes 1903–present)
Month	Jan	Feb	Mar	Apr	May	Jun	Jul	Aug	Sep	Oct	Nov	Dec	Year
Record high °F (°C)	84 (29)	85 (29)	92 (33)	93 (34)	97 (36)	112 (44)	111 (44)	112 (44)	106 (41)	93 (34)	86 (30)	79 (26)	112 (44)
Mean daily maximum °F (°C)	42.6 (5.9)	47.9 (8.8)	57.3 (14.1)	68.0 (20.0)	75.5 (24.2)	83.2 (28.4)	87.6 (30.9)	86.8 (30.4)	79.5 (26.4)	68.8 (20.4)	55.7 (13.2)	45.2 (7.3)	66.5 (19.2)
Daily mean °F (°C)	32.2 (0.1)	36.7 (2.6)	45.8 (7.7)	56.1 (13.4)	64.3 (17.9)	72.0 (22.2)	76.3 (24.6)	75.1 (23.9)	67.5 (19.7)	56.8 (13.8)	45.2 (7.3)	35.6 (2.0)	55.3 (12.9)
Mean daily minimum °F (°C)	21.8 (−5.7)	25.6 (−3.6)	34.2 (1.2)	44.2 (6.8)	53.1 (11.7)	60.9 (16.1)	64.9 (18.3)	63.4 (17.4)	55.5 (13.1)	44.9 (7.2)	34.7 (1.5)	26.0 (−3.3)	44.1 (6.7)
Record low °F (°C)	−28 (−33)	−23 (−31)	−8 (−22)	13 (−11)	29 (−2)	30 (−1)	44 (7)	39 (4)	27 (−3)	16 (−9)	−2 (−19)	−21 (−29)	−28 (−33)
Average precipitation inches (mm)	2.69 (68)	2.81 (71)	4.04 (103)	4.98 (126)	5.63 (143)	4.22 (107)	3.68 (93)	4.33 (110)	4.03 (102)	3.71 (94)	3.93 (100)	2.95 (75)	47.00 (1,194)
Average snowfall inches (cm)	0.2 (0.51)	0.4 (1.0)	0.5 (1.3)	0.0 (0.0)	0.0 (0.0)	0.0 (0.0)	0.0 (0.0)	0.0 (0.0)	0.0 (0.0)	0.0 (0.0)	0.1 (0.25)	0.1 (0.25)	1.3 (3.3)
Average precipitation days (≥ 0.01 in)	8.7	9.0	10.4	10.6	12.0	9.5	9.0	8.2	7.0	8.3	9.3	9.0	111.0
Average snowy days (≥ 0.1 in)	0.2	0.2	0.1	0.0	0.0	0.0	0.0	0.0	0.0	0.0	0.1	0.1	0.7
Source: NOAA

== Demographics ==
Historical population
Census	Pop.	Note	%±
1870	280		—
1880	1,624		480.0%
1890	1,815		11.8%
1900	1,481		−18.4%
1910	1,796		21.3%
1920	1,771		−1.4%
1930	2,250		27.0%
1940	3,151		40.0%
1950	3,611		14.6%
1960	3,870		7.2%
1970	4,363		12.7%
1980	4,454		2.1%
1990	4,486		0.7%
2000	4,854		8.2%
2010	4,950		2.0%
2020	4,608		−6.9%
U.S. Decennial Census

=== 2020 census ===
As of the 2020 census, Salem had a population of 4,608. The median age was 40.9 years. 23.0% of residents were under the age of 18 and 20.7% of residents were 65 years of age or older. For every 100 females there were 90.0 males, and for every 100 females age 18 and over there were 85.0 males age 18 and over.

98.7% of residents lived in urban areas, while 1.3% lived in rural areas.

There were 2,028 households in Salem, of which 27.5% had children under the age of 18 living in them. Of all households, 34.3% were married-couple households, 21.1% were households with a male householder and no spouse or partner present, and 36.4% were households with a female householder and no spouse or partner present. About 38.8% of all households were made up of individuals and 18.8% had someone living alone who was 65 years of age or older.

There were 2,308 housing units, of which 12.1% were vacant. The homeowner vacancy rate was 3.9% and the rental vacancy rate was 8.7%.

Racial composition as of the 2020 census
Race	Number	Percent
White	4,212	91.4%
Black or African American	25	0.5%
American Indian and Alaska Native	21	0.5%
Asian	32	0.7%
Native Hawaiian and Other Pacific Islander	4	0.1%
Some other race	27	0.6%
Two or more races	287	6.2%
Hispanic or Latino (of any race)	99	2.1%

=== 2010 census ===
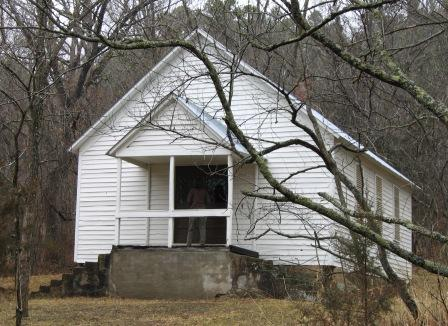
The Lower Parker School House which has been placed on the National Register of Historic Places.

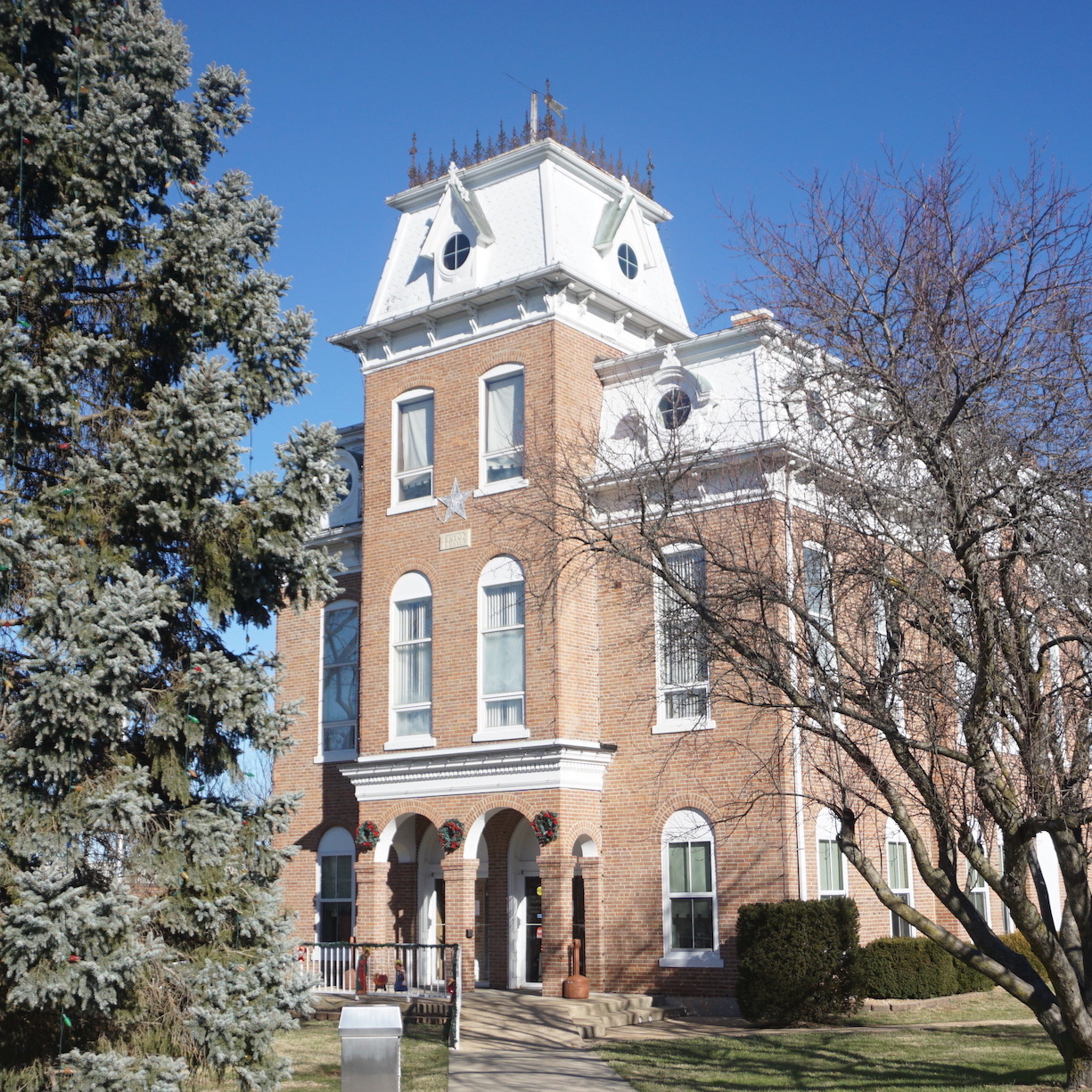
The Dent County Courthouse has been placed on the National Register of Historic Places listings in Missouri.

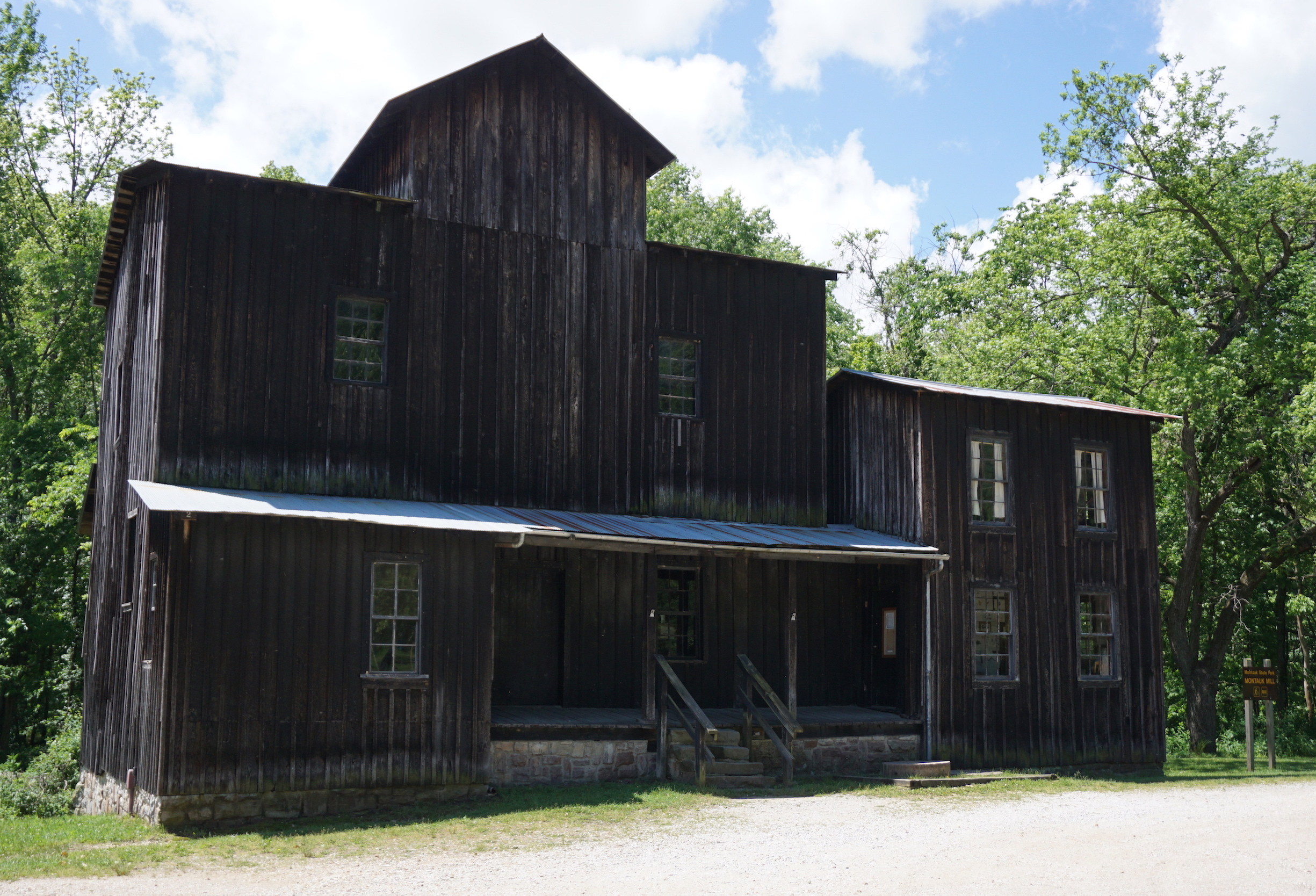
Old Mill at Montauk State Park has been placed on the National Register of Historic Places.

As of the census of 2010, there were 4,950 people, 2,152 households, and 1,248 families living in the city. The population density was 1,556.6 inhabitants per square mile (601.0/km^{2}). There were 2,408 housing units at an average density of 757.2 per square mile (292.4/km^{2}). The racial makeup of the city was 95.94% White, 0.53% Black or African American, 1.13% Native American, 0.16% Asian, 0.08% Native Hawaiian or Pacific Islander, 0.32% from other races, and 1.84% from two or more races. Hispanic or Latino of any race were 1.17% of the population.

There were 2,152 households, of which 28.5% had children under the age of 18 living with them, 40.1% were married couples living together, 13.6% had a female householder with no husband present, 4.3% had a male householder with no wife present, and 42.0% were non-families. 37.3% of all households were made up of individuals, and 17.9% had someone living alone who was 65 years of age or older. The average household size was 2.24 and the average family size was 2.93.

The median age in the city was 39.5 years. 24.2% of residents were under the age of 18; 8.8% were between the ages of 18 and 24; 22.5% were from 25 to 44; 24.1% were from 45 to 64; and 20.3% were 65 years of age or older. The gender makeup of the city was 46.5% male and 53.5% female.

=== 2000 census ===
As of the census of 2000, there were 4,854 people, 2,115 households, and 1,269 families living in the city. The population density was 1,607.4 inhabitants per square mile (620.6/km^{2}). There were 2,368 housing units at an average density of 784.2 per square mile (302.8/km^{2}). The racial makeup of the city was 97.05% White, 0.74% African American, 0.54% Native American, 0.16% Asian, 0.25% from other races, and 1.26% from two or more races. Hispanic or Latino of any race were 0.82% of the population.

There were 2,115 households, out of which 28.2% had children under the age of 18 living with them, 44.3% were married couples living together, 12.7% had a female householder with no husband present, and 40.0% were non-families. 36.3% of all households were made up of individuals, and 21.1% had someone living alone who was 65 years of age or older. The average household size was 2.21 and the average family size was 2.86.

In the city, the population was spread out, with 24.4% under the age of 18, 8.9% from 18 to 24, 24.7% from 25 to 44, 18.9% from 45 to 64, and 23.1% who were 65 years of age or older. The median age was 39 years. For every 100 females, there were 81.6 males. For every 100 females age 18 and over, there were 74.9 males.

The median income for a household in the city was $21,648, and the median income for a family was $29,460. Males had a median income of $27,006 versus $17,285 for females. The per capita income for the city was $12,766. About 12.9% of families and 17.4% of the population were below the poverty line, including 22.8% of those under age 18 and 11.3% of those age 65 or over.

== Education ==
Salem High School is the only high school located within the city. Salem is also home to an extension of Southwest Baptist University.

Salem has a lending library, the Salem Public Library.

== Notable people ==
- James Yancy Callahan, delegate to the United States House of Representatives representing the Oklahoma Territory (1887–1899)
- Ben Cantwell, MLB baseball player
- Orien Crow, NFL football player
- William P. Elmer, U.S. Representative from Missouri's 8th congressional district (1943–1945)
- Ralph K. Hofer, World War II Royal Canadian and (later) American fighter pilot, killed in action and recipient of the Distinguished Flying Cross (United States)
- Elmer Jacobs, MLB baseball player
- Doug Dillard and Mitchell F. Jayne of The Dillards, bluegrass musicians
- Paulette Jiles, novelist and poet
- Jason T. Smith, U.S. Representative from Missouri's 8th congressional district (2013- )

== See also ==
National Register of Historic Places listings in Dent County, Missouri
