= Dent County Courthouse =

- U.S. National Register of Historic Places
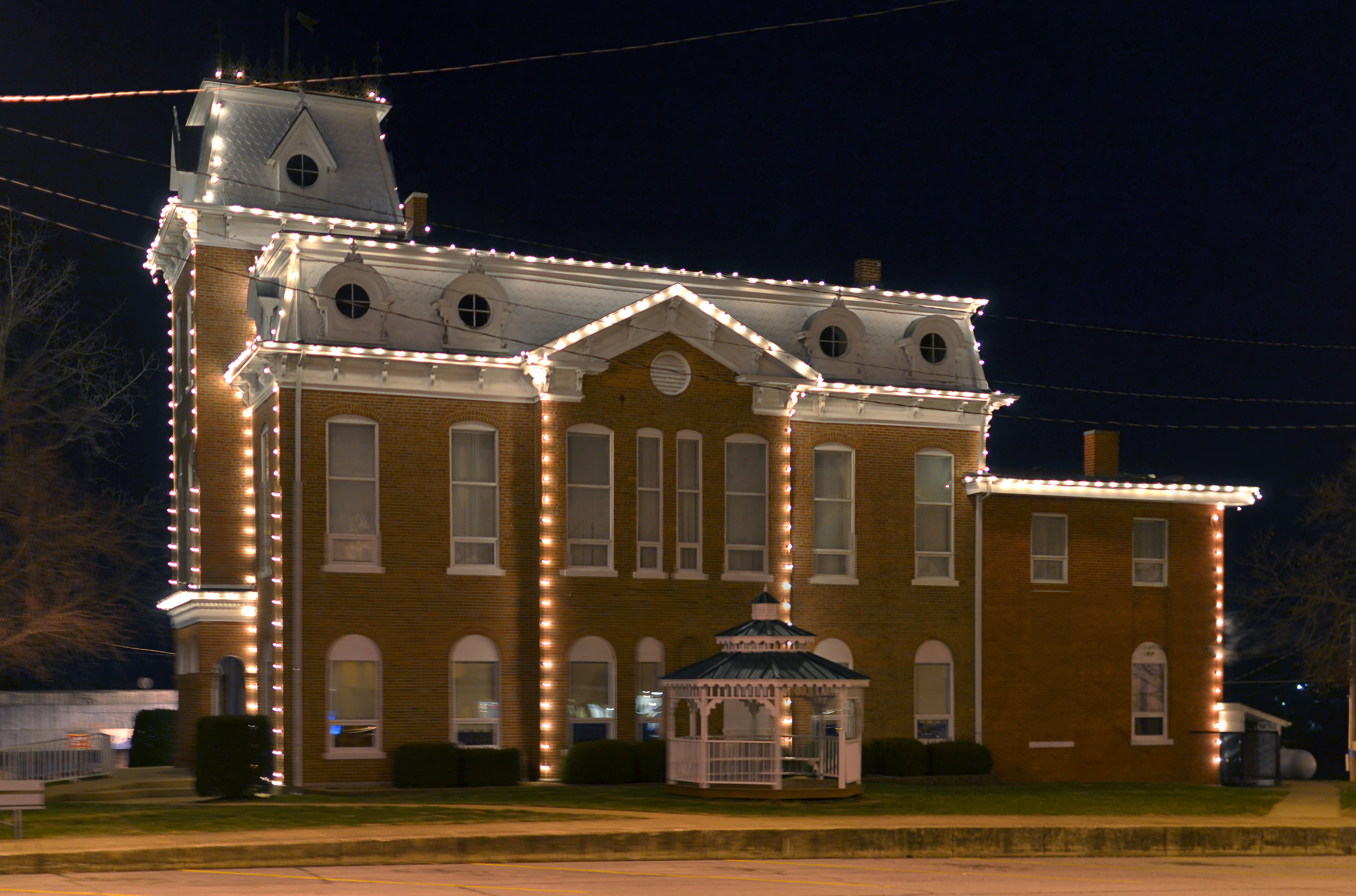
- Dent County Courthouse, January 2015

- Location within Missouri Location within the United States
- Location: Main and 4th Sts., Salem, Missouri
- Coordinates: 37°38′44″N 91°32′8″W
- Area: 1 acre (0.40 ha)
- Built: 1870, 1897
- Architect: Randolph Bros.
- Architectural style: Second Empire, Mansard
- NRHP reference No.: 72000711
- Added to NRHP: February 23, 1972

Dent County Courthouse is a historic courthouse located in Salem, Dent County, Missouri. It was built in 1870, with an addition constructed in 1897. It is a 2 1/2-story, Second Empire-style brick building on a hewn limestone foundation, with a 3 1/2-story central tower. It features high and narrow windows, lofty cornice, mansard roof and dormers and cast iron cresting.

It was listed on the National Register of Historic Places in 1972.
