= Lower Parker School =

- U.S. National Register of Historic Places
- U.S. Historic district
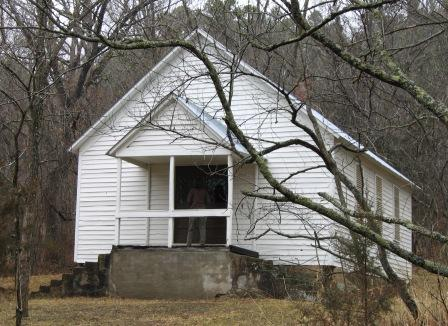

- Location within Missouri Location within the United States
- Location: Eastern bank of the Current River at Parker Hollow, Ozark National Scenic Riverways, near Salem, Missouri
- Area: 2 acres (0.81 ha)
- Built: 1906
- Architectural style: Vernacular schoolhouse
- MPS: Missouri Ozarks Rural Schools MPS
- NRHP reference No.: 91000604
- Added to NRHP: May 31, 1991

Lower Parker School, also known as District #73 School, is a historic one-room school and national historic district located near Salem, Dent County, Missouri. It was built in 1905 or 1906, and is a one-story, gable-front rectangular frame building measuring approximately 500 square feet. Also located in the district are the remains of two privies.

It was added to the National Register of Historic Places on May 31, 1991.
