= Ozark Highlands Spirits =

Category of distilled liquor

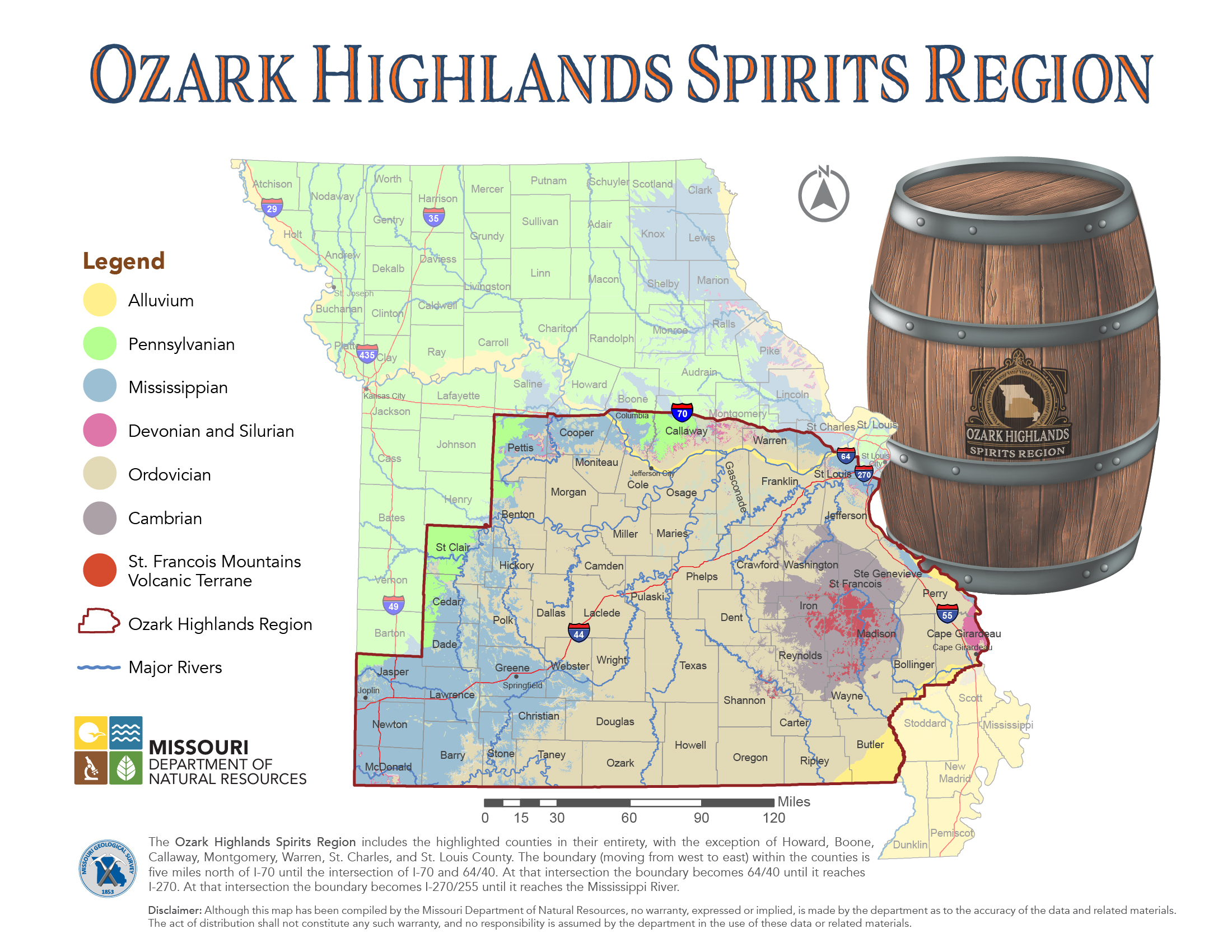
The Ozark Highlands Spirits Region as defined by the Missouri Department of Natural Resources

Ozark Highlands Spirits refers to a category of distilled liquor codified by the Missouri General Assembly of the U.S. State of Missouri in 2022. It was signed by the Missouri Governor on July 1, 2022, and became law on August 28, 2022.

== History ==
The history of making spirits, primarily moonshine, in the Ozark Highlands dates back to the 18th century. Irish and Scottish immigrants settled in the region, bringing their distilling skills with them. In order to avoid taxation, distillers hid their production by creating and selling their liquor at night, giving birth to the name moonshine. During Prohibition, moonlight manufacturing increased and distilling became a part of the Ozarks culture.

In 2022, a group of consumers and distillers came together to discuss how to codify Ozark Highlands spirits in Missouri law. Today, more than half of the 51 distilleries in Missouri are located in the Ozark Highlands.

== Legislation ==
The Ozark Highlands Spirits legislation was first introduced in the Missouri House as HB 2621 on February 1, 2022. The House hearing took place on March 21 and was passed by the House Committee on General Laws on March 31, 2022.

During the final days of session in 2022, the "Ozark Highlands Spirits" language was included as a Senate amendment to HB 1738 sponsored by Representative Shamed Dogan. The legislation was passed by the Missouri Senate on May 11, 2022, and was passed by the Missouri House on May 13, 2022, the final day of the 2022 session. It was delivered to Missouri Governor Mike Parson on May 18 and was signed by the Governor on July 1.

The law came into effect on August 28, 2022, and is listed as Missouri Revised Statutes 311.028. The region described as the Ozark Highlands for the purposes of this legislation was drafted by the Missouri Department of Natural Resources, as required by the language of the legislation.

== Requirements ==
Under the new Missouri law, the following requirements must be followed for a distiller to label their spirit as "Ozark Highlands" and sell it in Missouri.

- Produced and bottled in the Ozark Highlands
- Aged product must be aged in barrels manufactured in Missouri
- Whiskey must be aged for a minimum of 4 years
- Uses chemical-free water from the Ozark Highlands

== Certification ==
Under Missouri law, any distiller wishing to produce Ozark Highlands Spirits and label them as such for sale in Missouri must have each product initially certified by the Ozark Highland Distillers Guild. The Guild is a non-profit, volunteer-run, 501(c)(3) organization.
