= Cedargrove, Missouri =

Extinct town in the American state of Missouri

Coordinates: 37°25′07″N 91°36′26″W

Cedargrove (sometimes spelled Cedar Grove) is an extinct town in the northwest corner of Shannon County, in the Ozarks of southern Missouri. The GNIS classifies it as a populated place. The community is located just south of the Shannon - Dent county line on the Current River, just north of the Big Creek confluence with the Current. It lies at the end of Missouri Route B, two miles east of the Shannon - Texas county line.

A post office called Cedar Grove was established in 1890, the name was changed to Cedargrove in 1895, and the post office closed in 1957. The community was named for a grove of cedar timber near the original town site.

A detailed history of the extinct village of Cedar Grove can be found in the book, "Summers at Cedar Grove: The Rise and Fall of an Ozark Village," by Ben Timson, Published by Page Publishing, Conneaut Lake, PA, 2024.
