= Paris High School =

Paris High School may refer to:

In Canada:

- Paris District High School, Paris, Ontario

In the United States:

- Paris High School (Arkansas), Paris, Arkansas
- Paris High School (Paris, Illinois), Paris, Illinois
- Paris High School (Kentucky), Paris, Kentucky
- Paris High School (Missouri), Paris, Missouri
- Paris High School (Texas), Paris, Texas
