= Freeborn T. Lasater House =

Historic house in Arkansas, United States

- U.S. National Register of Historic Places
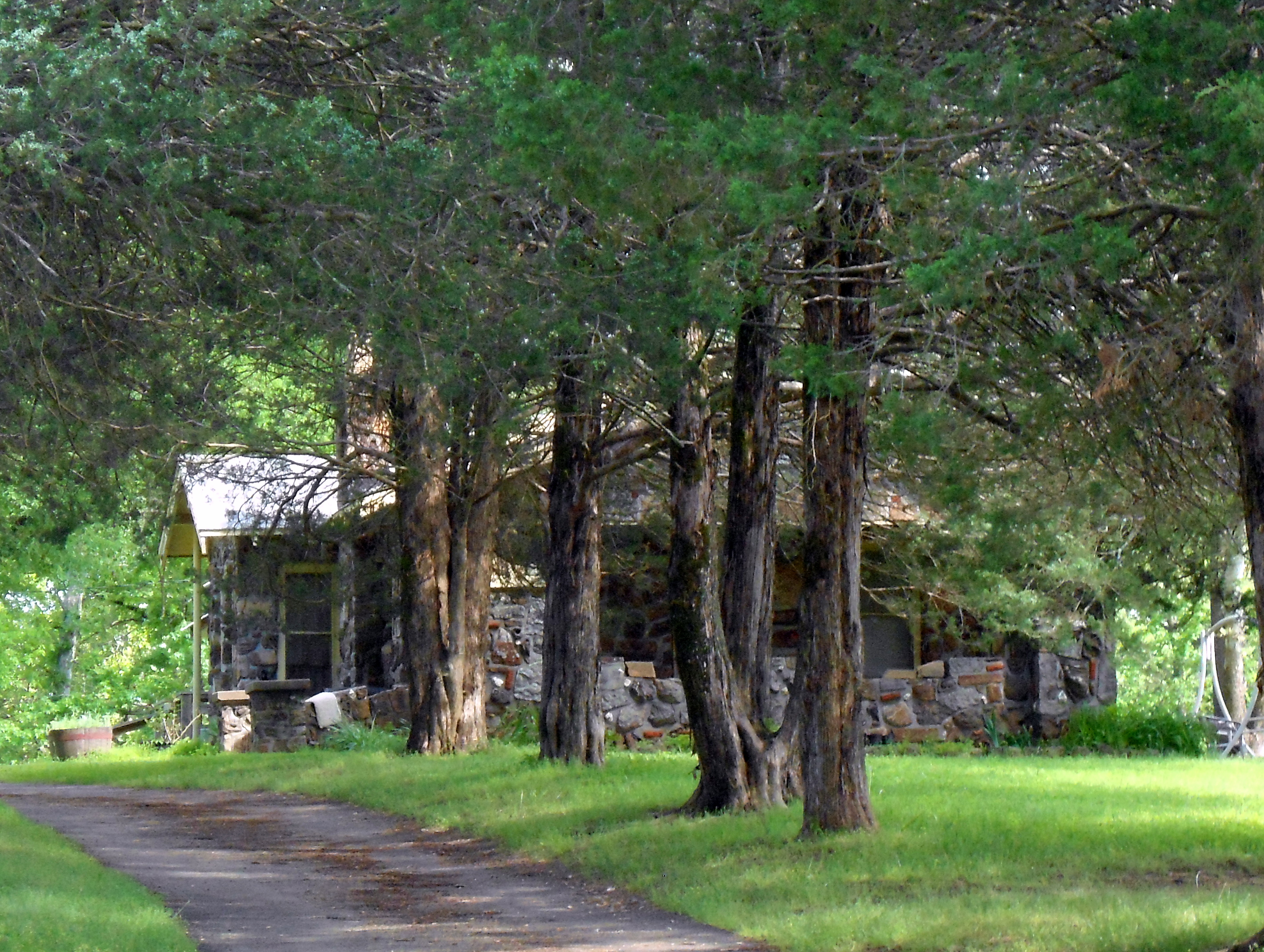

- Location within Arkansas Location within the United States
- Location: 494 AR 197, New Blaine, Arkansas
- Coordinates: 35°17′22″N 93°25′6″W
- Area: less than one acre
- Built: 1928
- Built by: Freeborn T. Lasater
- Architectural style: Bungalow/craftsman
- MPS: New Blaine, Arkansas MPS
- NRHP reference No.: 02000756
- Added to NRHP: July 11, 2002

The Freeborn T. Lasater House is a historic house at 494 Arkansas Highway 197 in New Blaine, Arkansas. It is a single-story masonry structure, built out of uncoursed fieldstone, with petrified wood and Native American stone tools, discovered on the property, embedded at various points. It was built over a six-year period by Freeborn Lasater and his family, beginning in 1928, and is the small communities best example of Craftsman architecture.

The house was listed on the National Register of Historic Places in 2002.

== See also ==
- National Register of Historic Places listings in Logan County, Arkansas
