= Main Street Bridge (New Blaine, Arkansas) =

- U.S. National Register of Historic Places
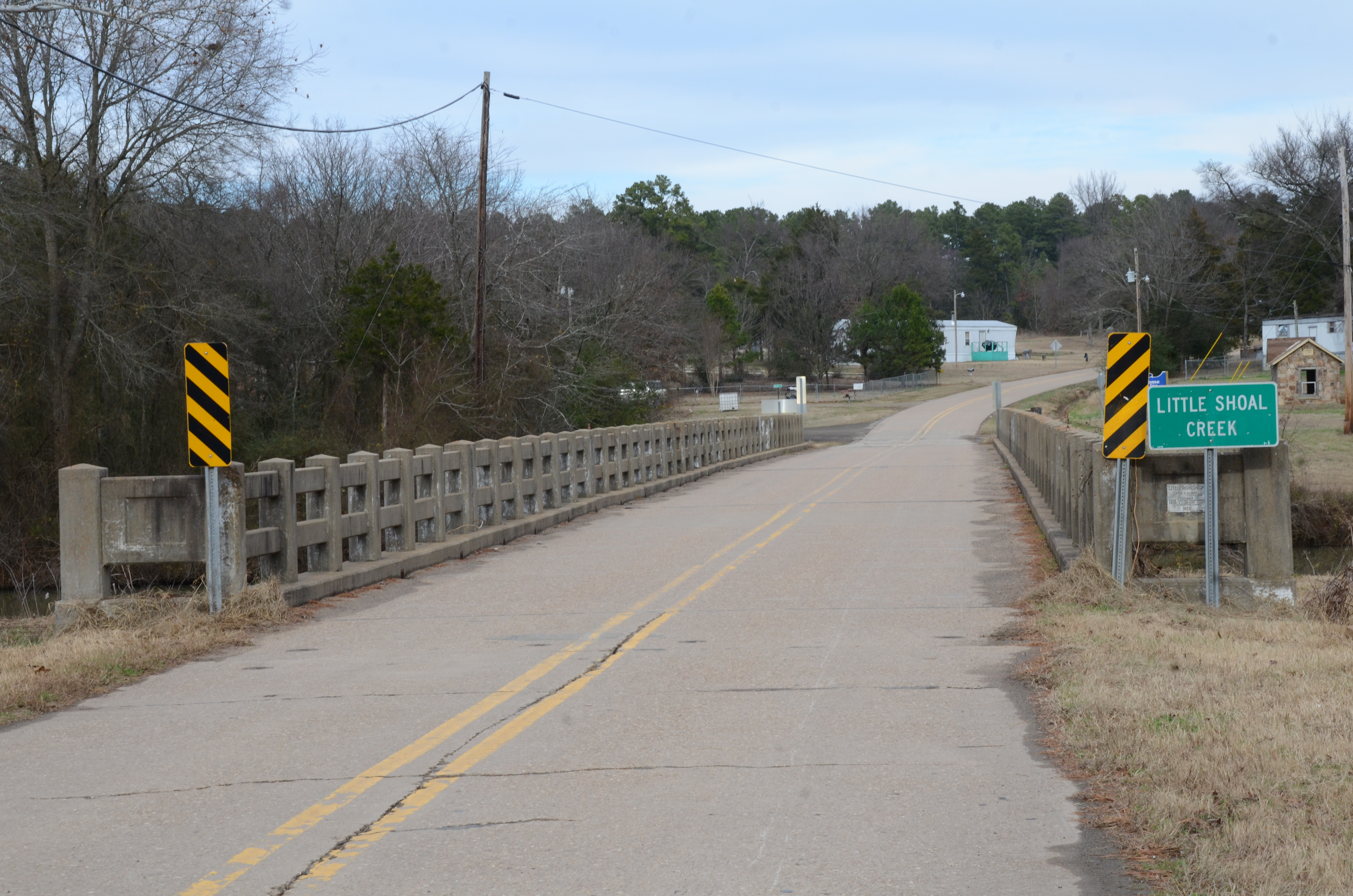

- Location within Arkansas Location within the United States
- Location: Sellers St. at Silver Smith Branch, New Blaine, Arkansas
- Coordinates: 35°17′19″N 93°25′13″W
- Area: less than one acre
- Built: 1922
- Built by: Aaron Moore, et.al.
- Architectural style: Masonry closed spandrel arch
- MPS: New Blaine, Arkansas MPS
- NRHP reference No.: 02000755
- Added to NRHP: July 11, 2002

The Main Street Bridge carries Sellers Street across a portion of the Silver Smith Branch in New Blaine, Arkansas. Built in 1922, it is a closed-spandrel masonry arch bridge, built out of locally quarried stone. It has a total length of 19 feet (5.8 m) and is about 20 feet (6.1 m) wide. It is named "Main Street Bridge" because Sellers Street was known as Main Street at the time of its construction, and was the principal route from the railroad depot to New Blaine's commercial and industrial area.

The bridge was listed on the National Register of Historic Places in 2002.

== See also ==
- National Register of Historic Places listings in Logan County, Arkansas
- List of bridges on the National Register of Historic Places in Arkansas
