= Farmer's State Bank =

- U.S. National Register of Historic Places
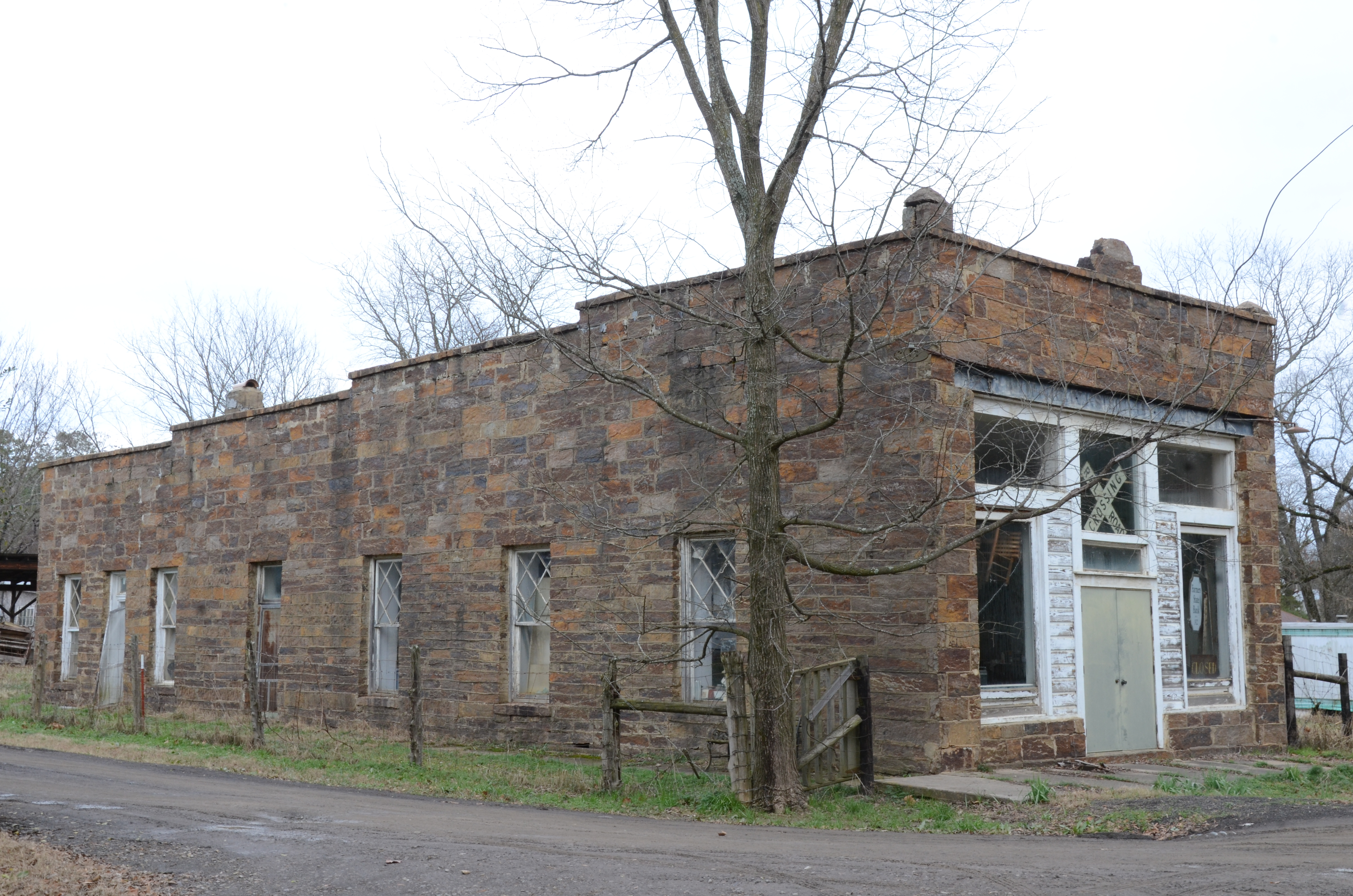

- Location within Arkansas Location within the United States
- Location: 100 Seller St., New Blaine, Arkansas
- Coordinates: 35°17′24″N 93°25′16″W
- Area: less than one acre
- Built: 1922
- Built by: Aaron Moore (foreman), John Friga & Lasater Freeborn
- Architectural style: Early Commercial
- MPS: New Blaine, Arkansas MPS
- NRHP reference No.: 02000757
- Added to NRHP: July 11, 2002

The Farmer's State Bank is a historic commercial building on Seller Street in New Blaine, Arkansas. It is a long rectangular single-story masonry structure, built of cut fieldstone and covered by a flat parapeted roof. The front facade has a single storefront, consisting of plate glass windows flanking a double-door entry, with large transom windows above all three elements. Built in 1922, it is the sole surviving commercial building along what was once New Blaine's commercial downtown area.

The building was listed on the National Register of Historic Places in 2002.

== See also ==
- National Register of Historic Places listings in Logan County, Arkansas
