= New Blaine, Arkansas =

- Census-designated place
- Location in Logan County, Arkansas

- Location within Arkansas Location within the United States
- Coordinates: 35°17′35″N 93°25′13″W
- Country: United States
- State: Arkansas
- County: Logan

Area
  - Total: 1.90 sq mi (4.93 km^{2})
  - Land: 1.59 sq mi (4.13 km^{2})
  - Water: 0.31 sq mi (0.80 km^{2})
- Elevation: 397 ft (121 m)

Population (2020)
  - Total: 173
  - Density: 108.5/sq mi (41.88/km^{2})
- Time zone: UTC-6 (Central (CST))
  - Summer (DST): UTC-5 (CDT)
- Area code: 479
- GNIS feature ID: 2612130
- FIPS code: 05-49070

New Blaine is an unincorporated community and census-designated place (CDP) in Logan County, Arkansas, United States. Per the 2020 census, the population was 173.

The following sites listed on the National Register of Historic Places are in or near New Blaine:

- Anhalt Barn, on County Road 68
- Old Arkansas Highway 22, part of AR 197, AR 197 Loop, and Rainwater Loop
- Elizabeth Hall, off AR 22
- Farmer's State Bank, at 100 Seallars St.
- Freeborn T. Lasater House, at 494 AR 197
- Main Street Bridge, 2002 Sellers St. at Silver Smith Branch
- New Blaine School, at the junction of AR 22 and Spring Rd.
- Troy Lasater Service Station, on the AR 197 Loop.

== Geography ==
The community is in eastern Logan County in the valley of Little Shoal Creek at its inlet to an arm of Lake Dardanelle, an impoundment on the Arkansas River. Arkansas Highway 22 passes through the community, leading east 16 miles (26 km) to Dardanelle and west 18 miles (29 km) to Paris. Highway 197 branches north from Highway 22 in New Blaine, leading north 2 miles (3 km) to the Shoal Bay Recreation Area.

According to the U.S. Census Bureau, the New Blaine CDP has a total area of 2.0 square miles (5.1 km^{2}), of which 1.6 square miles (4.2 km^{2}) are land and 0.3 square miles (0.8 km^{2}), or 16.53%, are water.

== Demographics ==
Historical population
| Census | Pop. | Note | %± |
|---|---|---|---|
| 2010 | 174 | | — |
| 2020 | 173 | | −0.6% |
U.S. Decennial Census; 2010 2020

=== 2020 census ===
New Blaine CDP, Arkansas – Demographic Profile (NH = Non-Hispanic) Note: the US Census treats Hispanic/Latino as an ethnic category. This table excludes Latinos from the racial categories and assigns them to a separate category. Hispanics/Latinos may be of any race.
| Race / Ethnicity | Pop 2010 | Pop 2020 | % 2010 | % 2020 |
|---|---|---|---|---|
| White alone (NH) | 168 | 140 | 96.55% | 80.92% |
| Black or African American alone (NH) | 0 | 0 | 0.00% | 0.00% |
| Native American or Alaska Native alone (NH) | 0 | 0 | 0.00% | 0.00% |
| Asian alone (NH) | 0 | 17 | 0.00% | 9.83% |
| Pacific Islander alone (NH) | 0 | 0 | 0.00% | 0.00% |
| Some Other Race alone (NH) | 0 | 0 | 0.00% | 0.00% |
| Mixed Race/Multi-Racial (NH) | 2 | 9 | 1.15% | 5.20% |
| Hispanic or Latino (any race) | 4 | 7 | 2.30% | 4.05% |
| Total | 174 | 173 | 100.00% | 100.00% |

== Education ==
Paris is in the Paris School District, which operates Paris High School.
