= New Blaine School =

- U.S. National Register of Historic Places
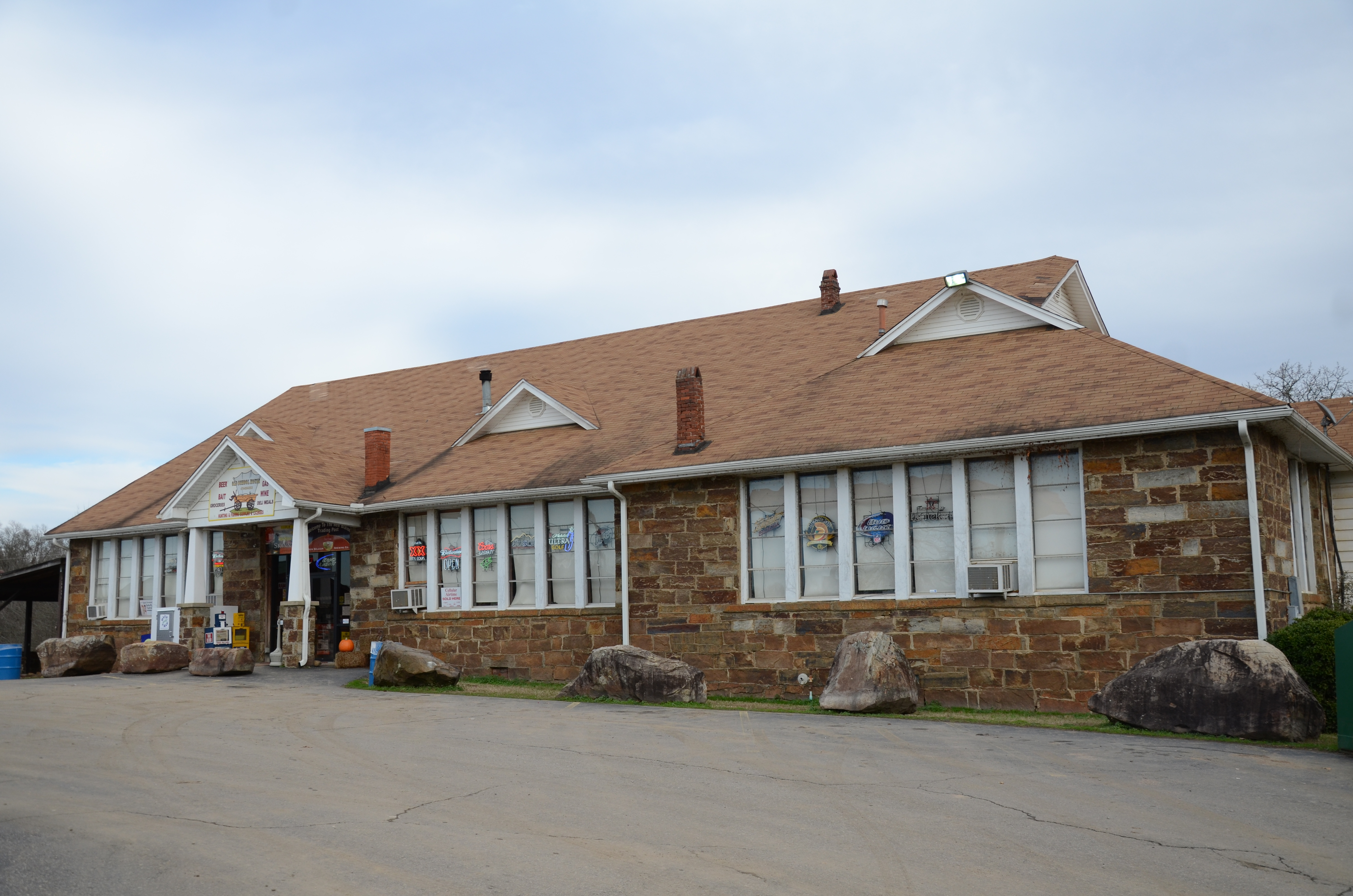

- Location within Arkansas Location within the United States
- Nearest city: New Blaine, Arkansas
- Coordinates: 35°17′6″N 93°25′17″W
- Area: less than one acre
- Built: 1925
- Architectural style: Bungalow/craftsman, Plain Traditional
- NRHP reference No.: 92001007
- Added to NRHP: August 18, 1992

The New Blaine School is a historic school building at the junction of Arkansas Highway 22 and Spring Road in New Blaine, Arkansas. It is a single story masonry structure, built of coursed stone and covered by a complex gable-on-hip roof with triangular dormers. Its entrances are sheltered by Craftsman-style gabled porticos, supported by tapered square posts set on stone piers. It was built in 1925 by a local contractor to replace an older school.

The building was listed on the National Register of Historic Places in 1992.

== See also ==
- National Register of Historic Places listings in Logan County, Arkansas
