= Elizabeth Hall (New Blaine, Arkansas) =

- U.S. National Register of Historic Places
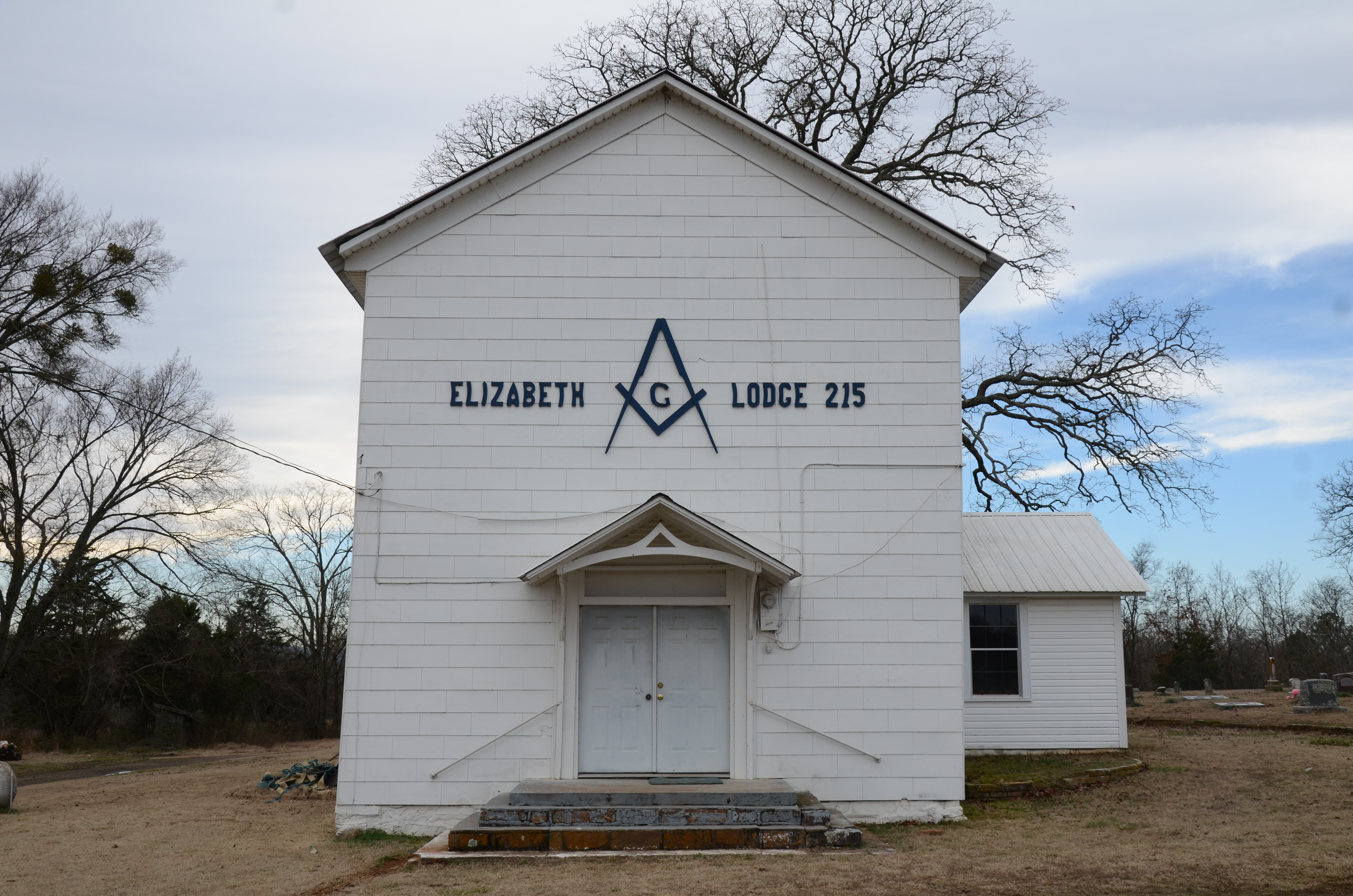

- Location within Arkansas Location within the United States
- Location: Off AR 22, New Blaine, Arkansas
- Coordinates: 35°17′3″N 93°24′32″W
- Area: 1 acre (0.40 ha)
- Built: 1867
- Built by: Griffeth, E.N.
- NRHP reference No.: 76000428
- Added to NRHP: May 4, 1976

Elizabeth Hall is a historical building off Arkansas Highway 22 in New Blaine, Arkansas. It was built in 1867 as a Masonic meeting hall with funding and land donated by Masonic lodge members of Elizabeth Lodge 215 F & A M. The building is also known by that lodge's name. The lodge meets in the upper floor, while the ground floor has served as a school, a church, and a funeral chapel. The building has been described as "one of the finest remaining rural structures erected in nineteenth-century Arkansas". It was built "under the supervision of the New Blaine sheriff, E. N. Griffeth."

The building was listed on the National Register of Historic Places in 1976. The listing included one contributing site (the adjacent Elizabeth Cemetery) in addition to the contributing building.

== See also ==
- National Register of Historic Places listings in Logan County, Arkansas
