= Paris School District =

School district in Arkansas, United States

Address
- 602 North Tenth Street Paris, Arkansas, 72855; United States

District information
- Type: Public
- Grades: PreK–12
- NCES District ID: 0511130

Students and staff
- Students: 1,050
- Teachers: 102.13
- Staff: 118.97
- Student–teacher ratio: 10.28

Other information
- Website: parisschools.org

Paris School District 7 is a school district in Paris, Arkansas, United States.

The district encompasses 223.90 square miles (579.9 km^{2}) of land in Logan County, and serves Paris, New Blaine, and a section of Subiaco.

In 1968 the Logan County school district merged into the Paris district.

== Schools ==
- Paris High School, serving grades 9 through 12.
- Paris Middle School, serving grades 5 through 8.
- Paris Elementary School, serving prekindergarten through grade 4.
