= Troy Lasater Service Station =

- U.S. National Register of Historic Places
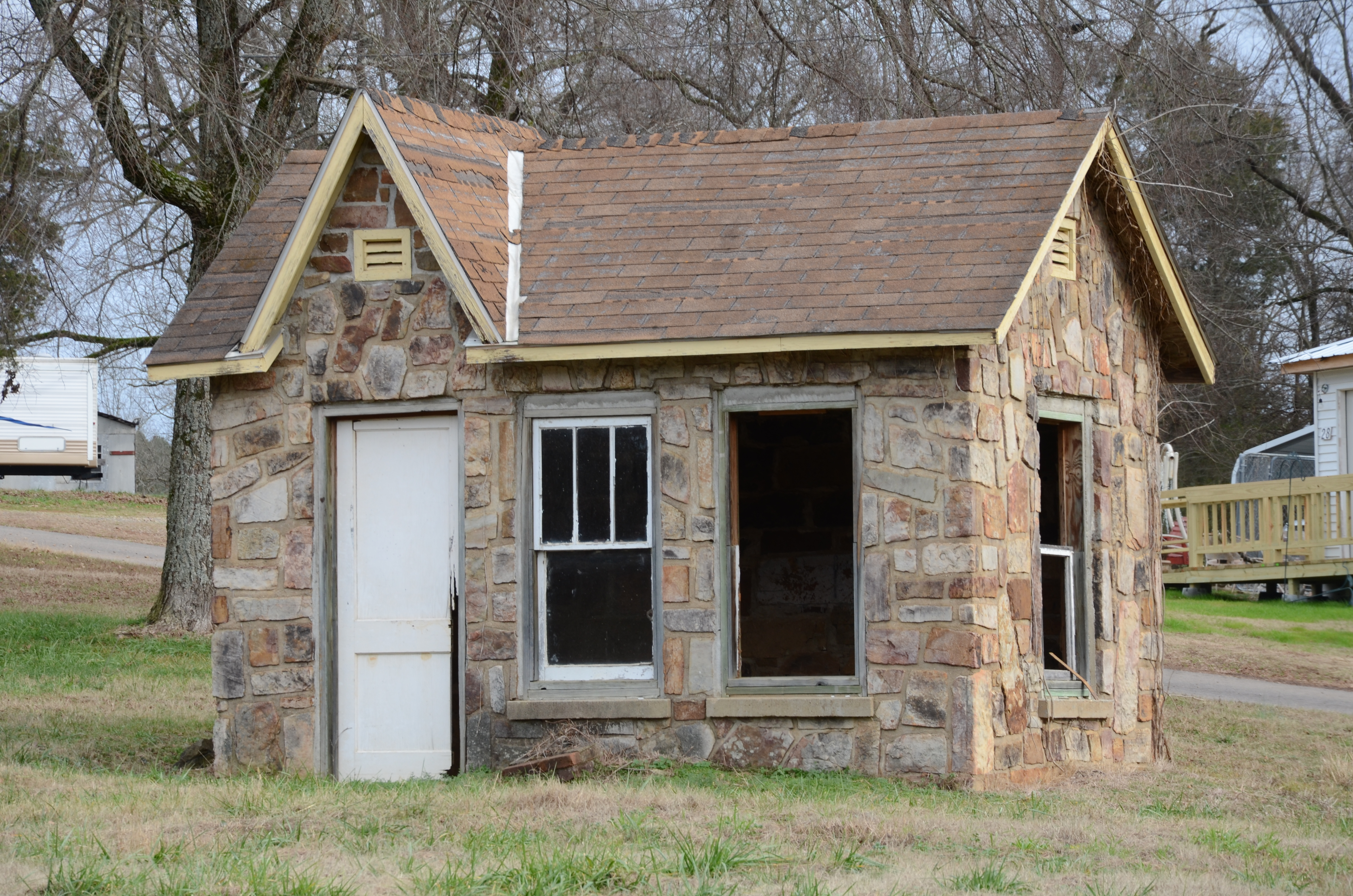

- Location within Arkansas Location within the United States
- Location: AR 197 Loop, New Blaine, Arkansas
- Coordinates: 35°17′20″N 93°25′11″W
- Area: 1 acre (0.40 ha)
- Built: 1935
- Architect: Freeborn T. Lasater
- Architectural style: Late 19th And 20th Century Revivals
- MPS: New Blaine, Arkansas MPS
- NRHP reference No.: 02001075
- Added to NRHP: October 4, 2002

The Troy Lasater Service Station is a historic former automotive service station on Arkansas Highway 197 in New Blaine, Arkansas. It is a small single-story stone structure with a gabled roof, set in a small grassy area at the junction of AR 197 and Wood Lane. A cross gable is set above the entrance, which is on the left of the three-bay main facade. It was built in 1935 by Freeborn and Troy Lasater, and is a locally distinctive example of vernacular English Revival architecture. It was operated as a single-pump service station into the 1940s.

The building was listed on the National Register of Historic Places in 2002.

== See also ==
- National Register of Historic Places listings in Logan County, Arkansas
