= Anhalt Barn =

- U.S. National Register of Historic Places
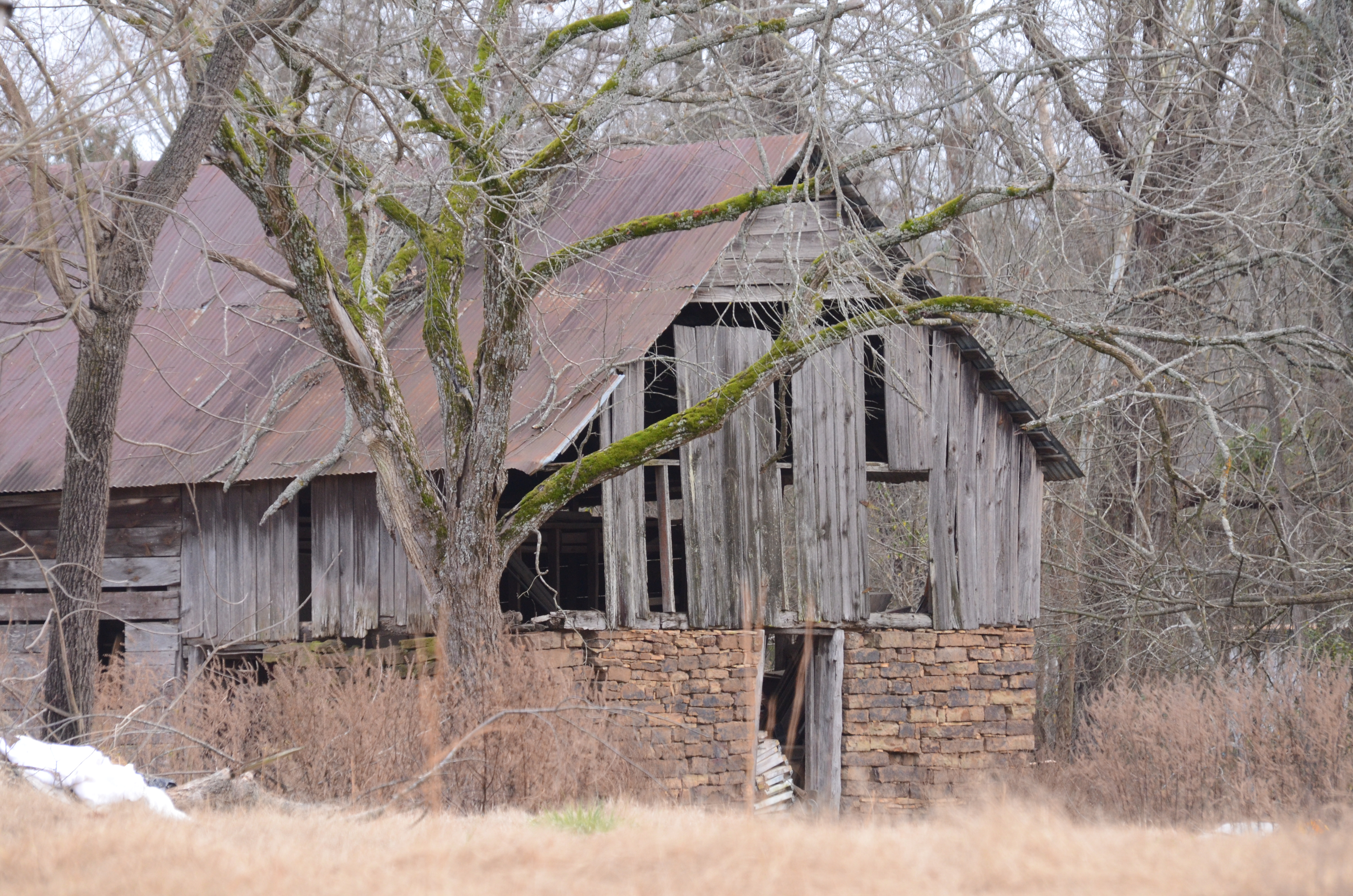

- Location within Arkansas Location within the United States
- Nearest city: New Blaine, Arkansas
- Coordinates: 35°17′56″N 93°28′46″W
- Area: less than one acre
- Built: 1878
- Built by: Anhalt, George Henry, Sr.
- Architectural style: Plain Traditional
- NRHP reference No.: 93000087
- Added to NRHP: February 25, 1993

The Anhalt Barn is a historic barn in rural eastern Logan County, Arkansas. It is located west of New Blaine, near the junction of Old Military and Artesian Well Roads.

It is a 1 1/2-story timber-frame structure with a gabled roof and a tall fieldstone foundation, laid out as a double crib with a central drive.

Built in 1878 by George Henry Anhalt, a German immigrant, it is the county's only known barn based on German barn-building principles.

It was listed on the National Register of Historic Places in 1993.

== See also ==
- National Register of Historic Places listings in Logan County, Arkansas
