= Paris High School (Arkansas) =

Location
- 2000 East Wood Street; Paris, Arkansas 72855; United States; 35°17′48″N 93°43′17″W

Information
- Type: Public secondary
- School district: Paris School District
- NCES District ID: 0511130
- CEEB code: 041970
- NCES School ID: 051113000837
- Principal: Casey Mainer
- Teaching staff: 43.03 (on FTE basis)
- Grades: 9-12
- Enrollment: 302 (2023-2024)
- Student to teacher ratio: 7.02
- Campus type: Rural
- Colors: Royal blue and white
- Athletics conference: 3A Region 4 (2012–19)
- Sports: Football, Basketball, Competitive Cheer, Dance, Golf, Baseball, Softball, Soccer, Marching Band Athletics
- Mascot: Eagle (Big Blue)
- Team name: Paris Eagles
- Affiliations: Arkansas Activities Association
- Website: www.parisschools.org/o/phs

Paris High School is a comprehensive public secondary school located in Paris in Logan County in western Arkansas, United States, for students in grades nine through twelve. Paris is the sole high school administered by the Paris School District.

Its boundary includes Paris, New Blaine, and a section of Subiaco.

== Curriculum ==
The assumed course of study for students is to complete the Smart Core curriculum developed by the Arkansas Department of Education (ADE), which requires students to complete at least 22 units for graduation. Paris High School offers regular (core and career focus) courses and exams and students may select Advanced Placement classes and exams with opportunities for college credit via AP exam.

Paris High School was evaluated as Achieving by the ADE for the 2008–09 and 2009–10 school years in support of Adequate Yearly Progress and Augmented Benchmark Examinations.

== Athletics ==
The Paris High School mascot and athletic emblem is known as the Eagle with the school colors of royal blue and white.

For the 2012-2014 seasons, the Paris Eagles participate in the 3A Classification from the 3A Region 4 Conference, as administered by the Arkansas Activities Association. Student-athletes compete in football, volleyball, golf (boys/girls), cross country (boys/girls), basketball (boys/girls), competitive cheer, dance, baseball, softball, tennis (boys/girls), and track and field (boys/girls).

- Tennis: The girls tennis team won a state tennis championship in 1997.
- Volleyball: The girls volleyball team won a back to back state championships in 2015, 2016, 2017, and 2018.
