= Fitzgerald Historic District =

Historic district in Arkansas, United States

- U.S. National Register of Historic Places
- U.S. Historic district
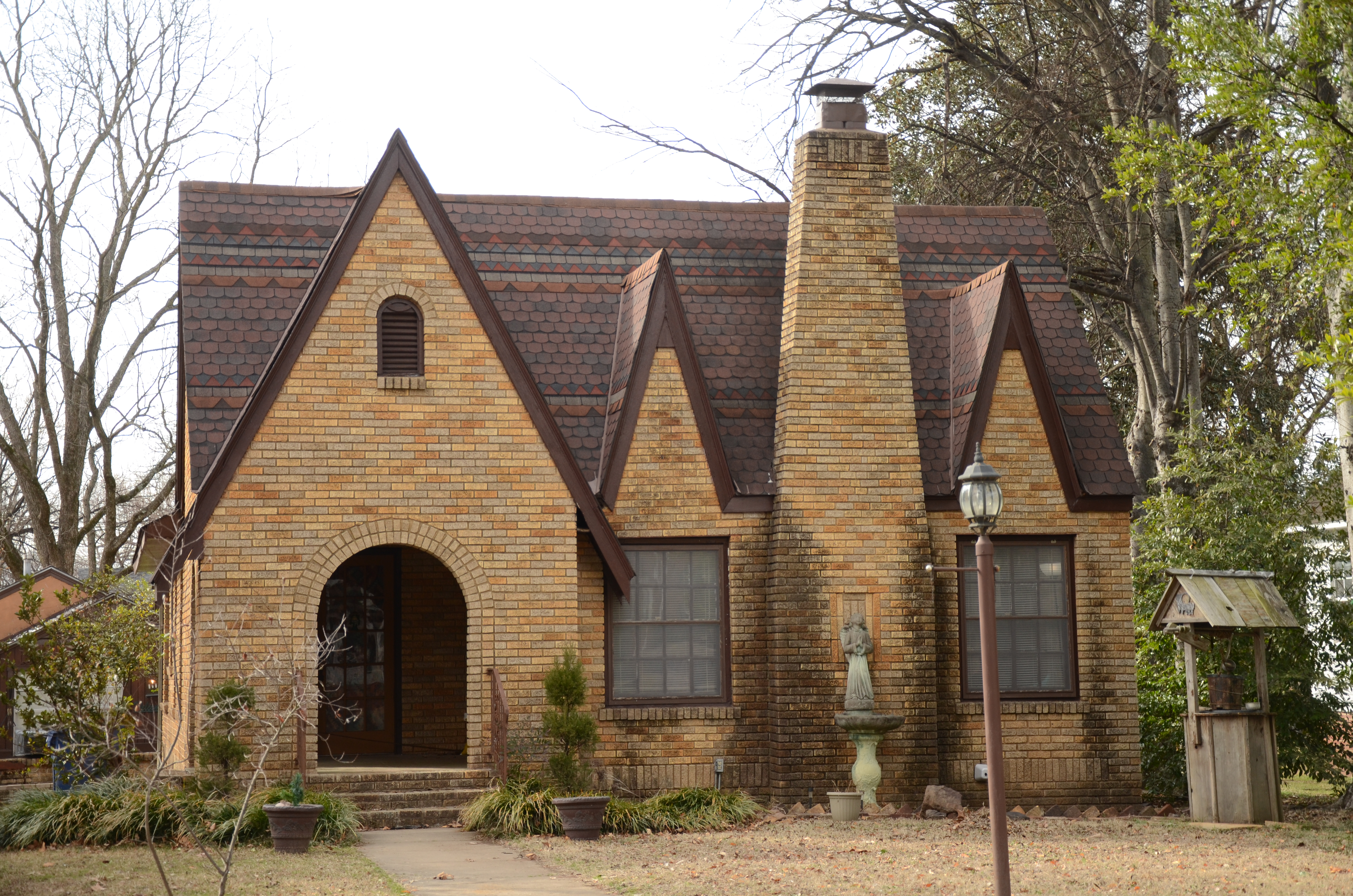

- Location within Arkansas Location within the United States
- Location: Roughly bounded by Rogers & Dodson Aves., S I, S 22nd & S 25th Sts.
- Coordinates: 35°22′32″N 94°24′28″W
- Area: 22 acres (8.9 ha)
- Architect: Multiple
- Architectural style: Late 19th and Early 20th Century Revivals, Bungalow/Craftsman
- NRHP reference No.: 100002005
- Added to NRHP: January 26, 2018

The Fitzgerald Historic District is a residential historic district located southeast of the central business district of Fort Smith, Arkansas. The district is roughly bounded by Rogers & Dodson Avemies, South I, S 22nd, and South 25th Streets, and covers 22 acres (8.9 ha). The neighborhood was developed after about 1906, as an area of affordable homes for working and middle class residents. It was built mainly on land sold of by Bishop Edward Fitzgerald of the local Roman Catholic diocese. Most of the buildings in the district are modestly scaled and decorated examples of Revival styles popular in the first three decades of the 20th century. The district is adjacent to the Fishback Neighborhood Historic District, which was developed about the same time.

The district was listed on the National Register of Historic Places in 2018.

== See also ==
- National Register of Historic Places listings in Sebastian County, Arkansas
