= James Sparks House =

Historic house in Arkansas, United States

- U.S. National Register of Historic Places
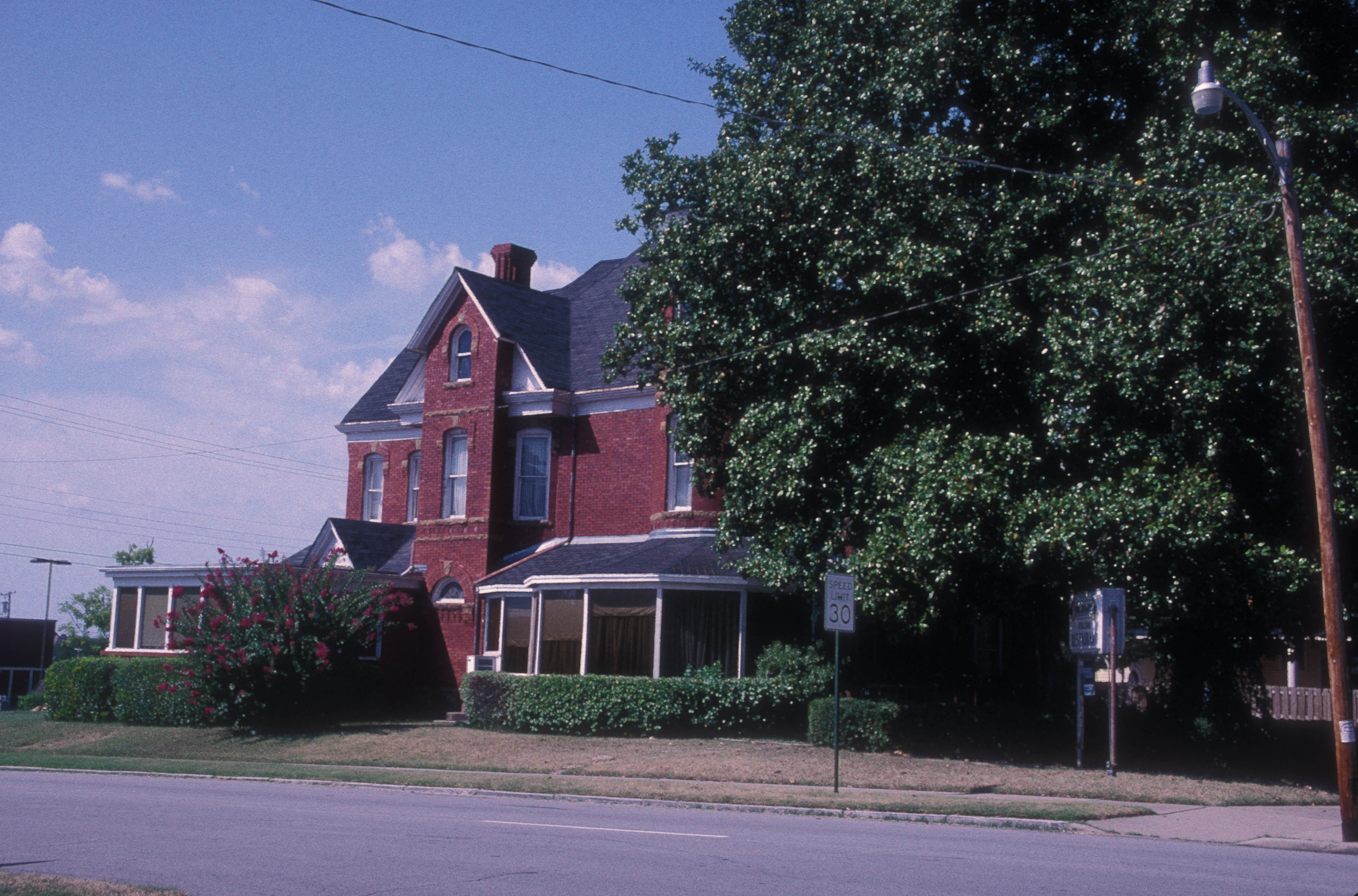

- Location within Arkansas Location within the United States
- Location: 201 N. 14th St., Fort Smith, Arkansas
- Coordinates: 35°23′8″N 94°24′55″W
- Area: 0 acres (0 ha)
- Built: 1890
- Architectural style: Romanesque, Victorian Romanesque
- NRHP reference No.: 72000210
- Added to NRHP: September 14, 1972

The James Sparks House is a historic house at 201 North 14th Street in Fort Smith, Arkansas. It is a 2 1/2-story brick structure, with a round three-story tower at one corner, around which a wraparound porch extends. It features Romanesque segmented-arch and round-arch windows, and chimneys with decorative corbelled tops. The interior features high-quality woodwork original to the house's c. 1887 construction. It was built by James M. Sparks, a prominent local businessman who was the son of an Irish immigrant. The house was carefully restored in the 20th century.

The house was listed on the National Register of Historic Places in 1972.

== See also ==
- National Register of Historic Places listings in Sebastian County, Arkansas
