= Tillman Shaw House =

Historic house in Arkansas, United States

- U.S. National Register of Historic Places
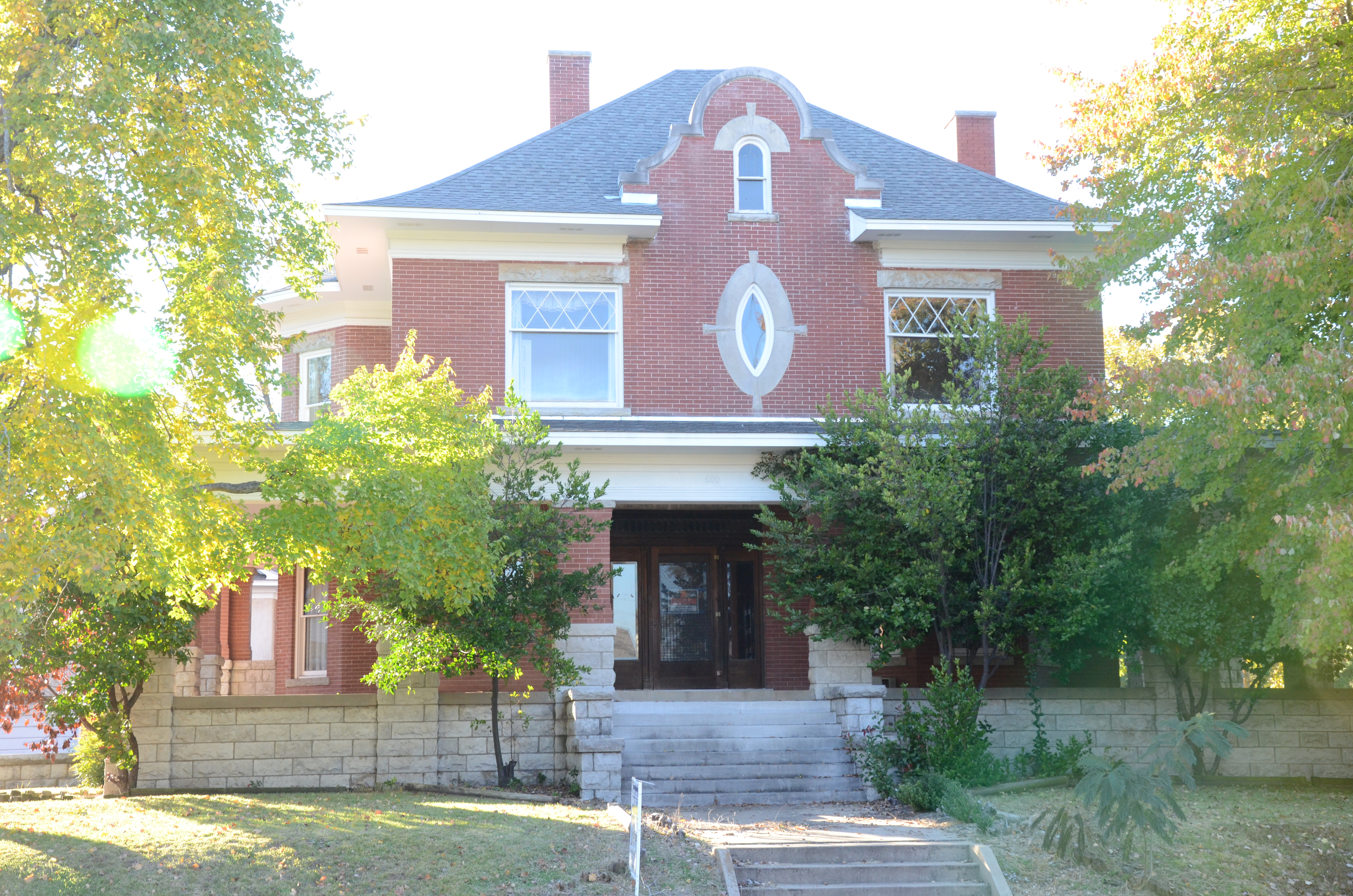

- Location within Arkansas Location within the United States
- Location: 500 S. Nineteenth St., Fort Smith, Arkansas
- Coordinates: 35°22′44″N 94°24′47″W
- Area: less than one acre
- Built: 1909
- Architectural style: Late 19th And 20th Century Revivals, Prairie School, American Foursquare
- NRHP reference No.: 88000561
- Added to NRHP: May 16, 1988

The Tillman Shaw House is a historic house at 500 South 19th Street in Fort Smith, Arkansas. The house is an architecturally eclectic two-story brick structure, set on an artificially raised plot in a neighborhood of predominantly smaller houses. It has a basic American Foursquare structure, with stylistic embellishments borrowed from a number of styles, including the Mission Revival, Prairie School, and Colonial Revival. It was built in 1909 by Tillman Shaw, a prosperous saloon owner in the then-frontier town. Shaw's fortunes were ruined by the advent of Prohibition, and he was forced to sell the house in 1919.

The house was listed on the National Register of Historic Places in 1988.

== See also ==
- National Register of Historic Places listings in Sebastian County, Arkansas
