= Joseph Knoble Brewery =

- U.S. National Register of Historic Places
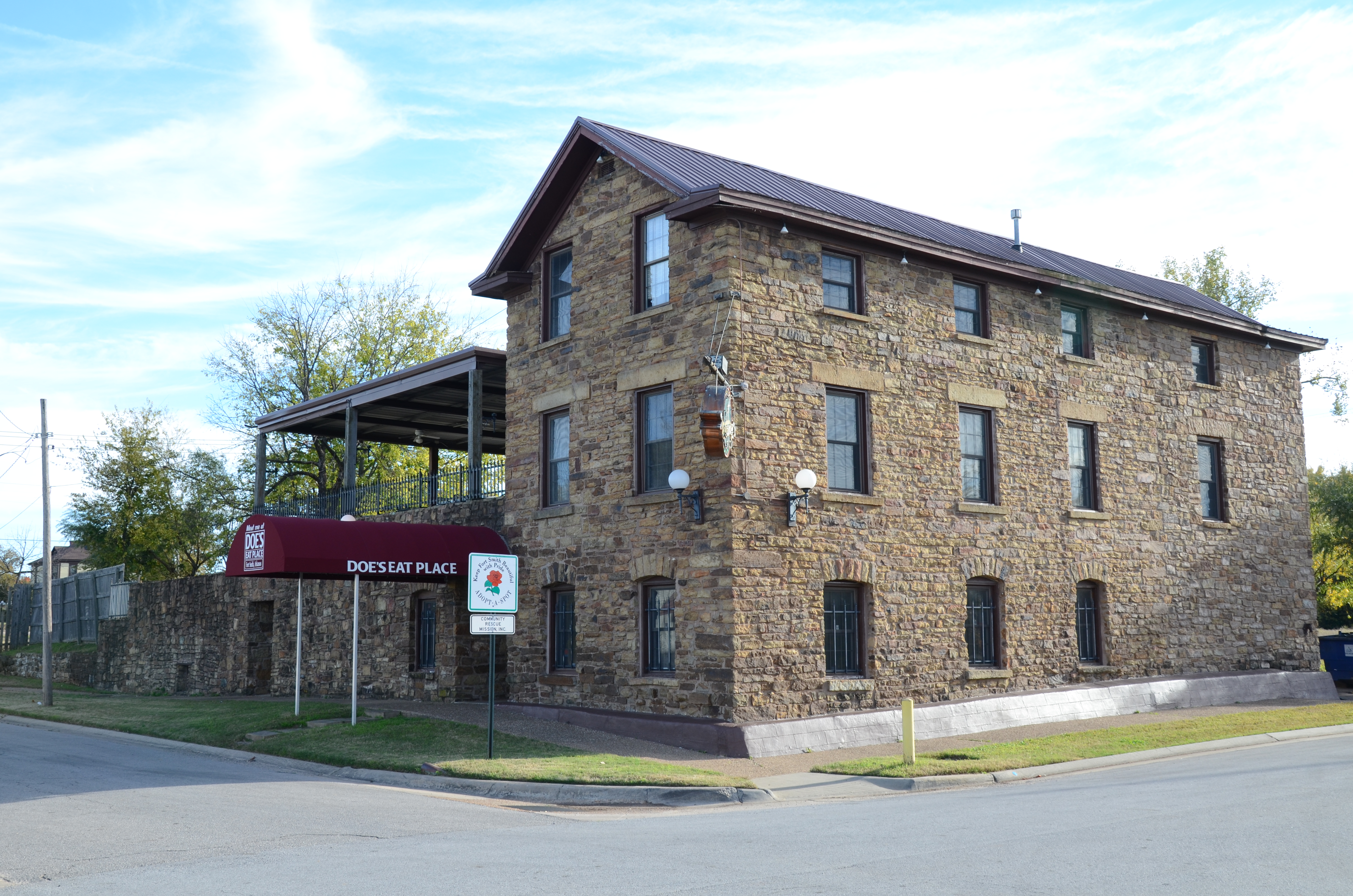

- Location within Arkansas Location within the United States
- Location: N. 3rd and E Sts., Fort Smith, Arkansas
- Coordinates: 35°23′33″N 94°25′22″W
- Area: less than one acre
- Built: 1851
- NRHP reference No.: 72000209
- Added to NRHP: March 24, 1972

The Joseph Knoble Brewery is a historic beer brewery building at North 3rd and "E" Streets in Fort Smith, Arkansas. Built in the early 1850s, it is a three-story stone building, with an extension beside that originally housed a large beer vault. The main beer production facility was on the third floor, and the first floor originally housed a tavern. The area beside the main building where the vault was located was eventually filled in, with a beer garden built on top of it. It is the only known surviving example of a mid-19th century brewery in the state.

The building was listed on the National Register of Historic Places in 1972. It now houses a restaurant.

== See also ==
- National Register of Historic Places listings in Sebastian County, Arkansas
