= William Ayers House =

Historic house in Arkansas, United States

- U.S. National Register of Historic Places
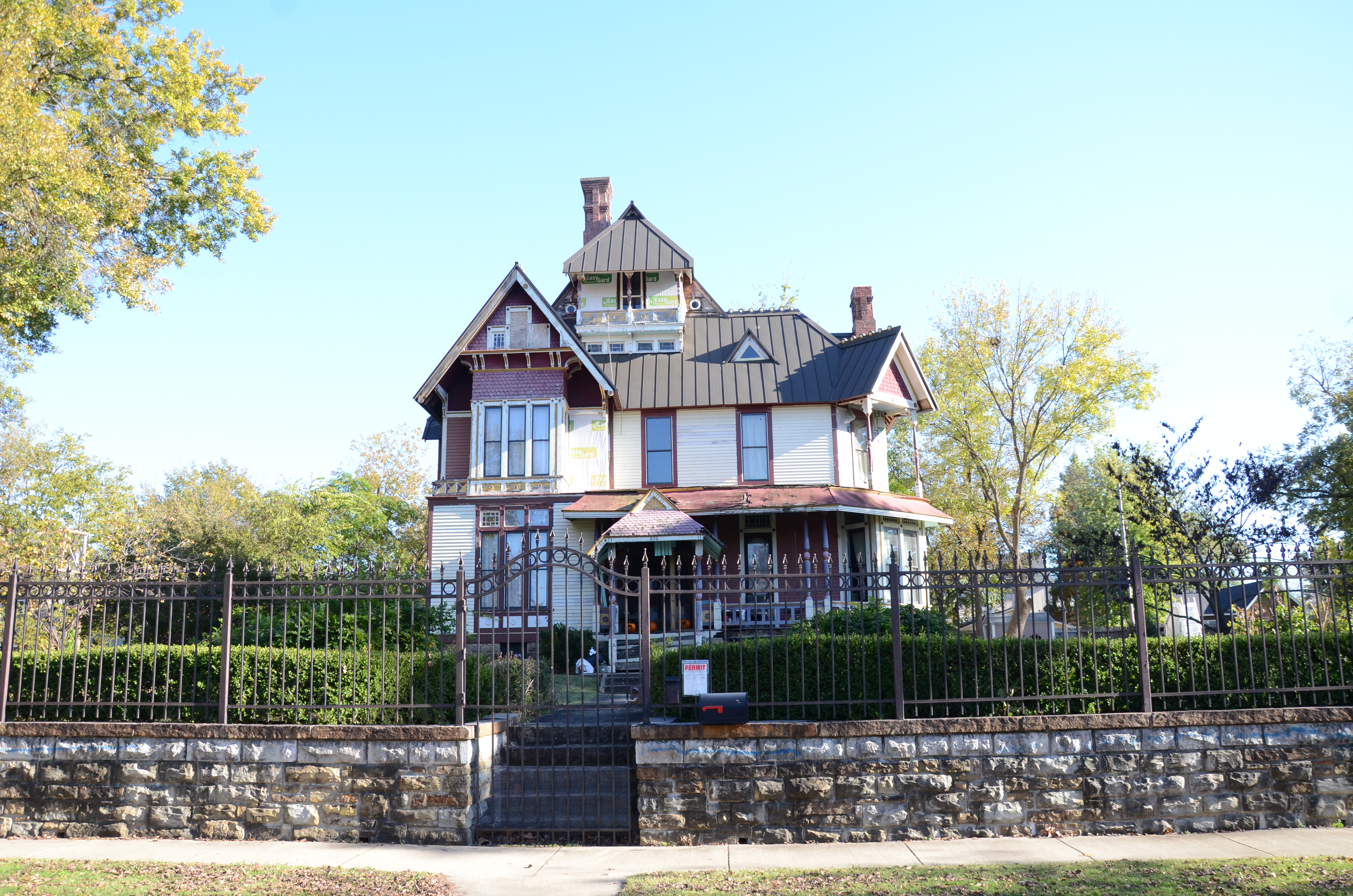

- Location within Arkansas Location within the United States
- Location: 820 N. 12th Street, Fort Smith, Arkansas
- Coordinates: 35°23′56″N 94°24′47″W
- Area: less than one acre
- Built: 1888
- Architectural style: Queen Anne, Stick/Eastlake
- NRHP reference No.: 99000792
- Added to NRHP: July 8, 1999

The William Ayers House is a historic house located at 820 North 12th Street in Fort Smith, Arkansas.

== Description and history ==
It is a 2 1/2-story, wood-framed structure, with asymmetrical massing and a variety of dormers, gables, porches, and exterior wall finishes typical of the Queen Anne style. Detailing includes vergeboard in gable ends, wall sections with decorative cut shingles, and corbelled chimney tops. It is an outstanding example of the architectural style in the city.

The house was listed on the National Register of Historic Places on July 8, 1999.

== See also ==
- National Register of Historic Places listings in Sebastian County, Arkansas
