= Bonneville House =

Historic house in Arkansas, United States

- U.S. National Register of Historic Places
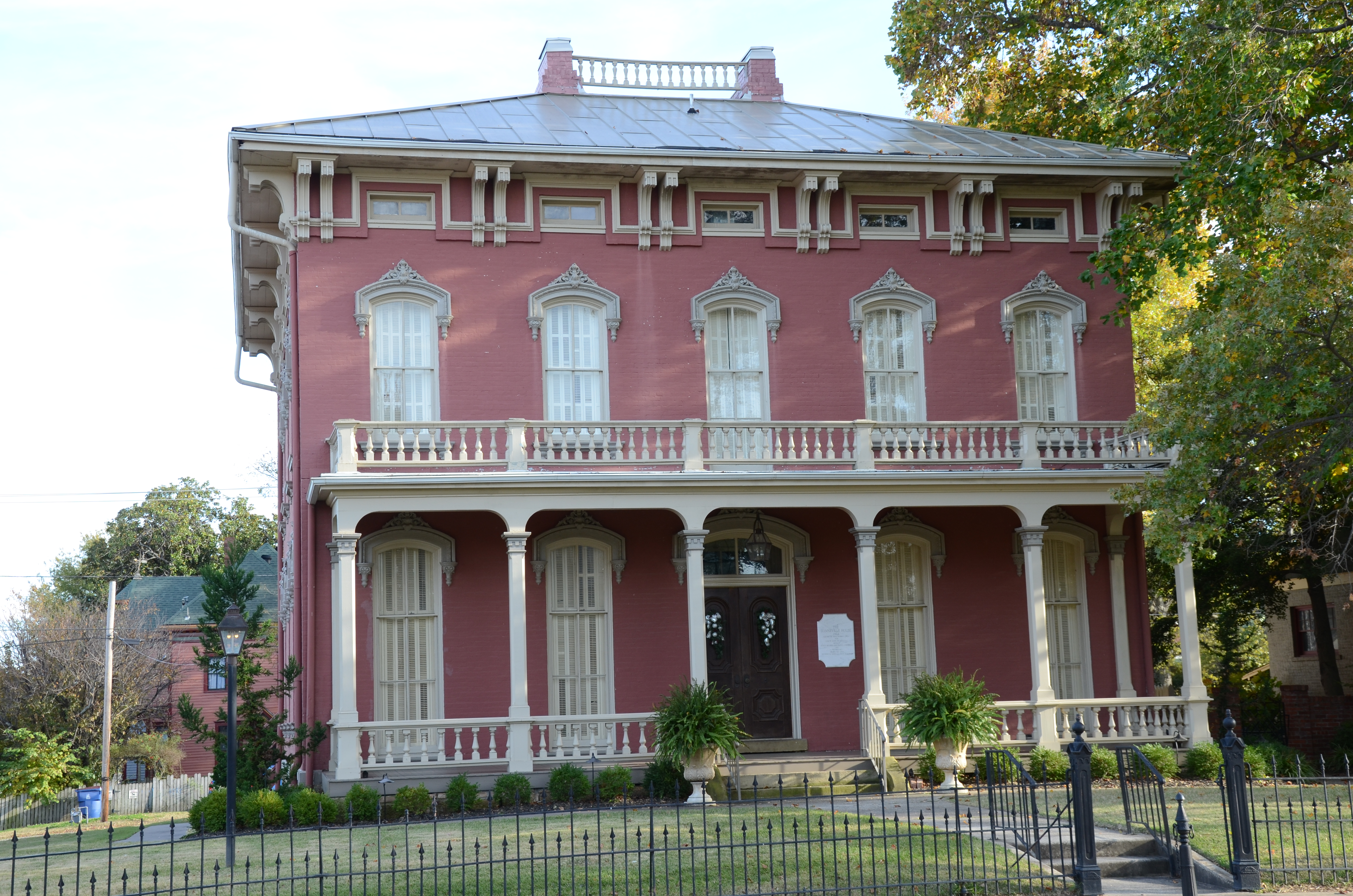

- Location within Arkansas Location within the United States
- Location: 318 N. 7th St., Fort Smith, Arkansas
- Coordinates: 35°23′21″N 94°25′14″W
- Area: less than one acre
- Built: 1880
- Architectural style: Early Victorian
- NRHP reference No.: 71000128
- Added to NRHP: September 22, 1971

The Bonneville House is a historic house at 318 North 7th Street in Fort Smith, Arkansas. It is a two-story brick structure, with a metal hip roof and a brick foundation. Built in 1880, its styling is predominantly Second Empire, with elaborate window hoods, heavy paired brackets in the eaves, and a full-width porch with turned balusters and posts with finely detailed capitals. In addition to its locally distinctive architecture, the house is historically significant as the home of explorer Benjamin Bonneville.

The house has been restored and is available for event rentals.

The house was listed on the National Register of Historic Places in 1971.

== Bonneville House Association ==
The Bonneville House Association consists of a Board of Directors and Executive Director to serve for the preservation, upkeep, and operation of The Bonneville House as a historical landmark and event venue.

== See also ==
- National Register of Historic Places listings in Sebastian County, Arkansas
