= Harold Adams Office Building =

- U.S. National Register of Historic Places
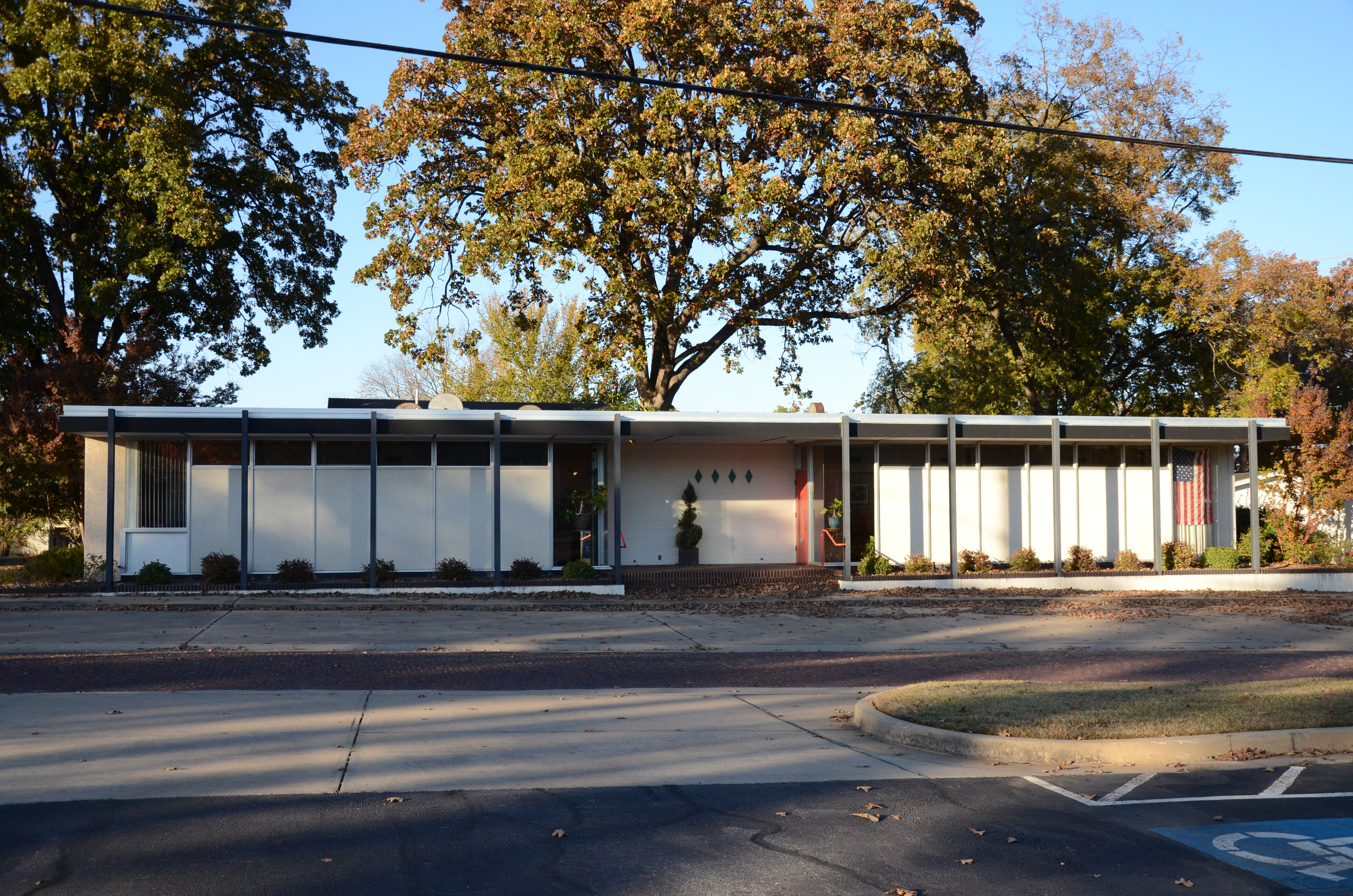

- Location within Arkansas Location within the United States
- Location: 2101 S. H St., Fort Smith, Arkansas
- Coordinates: 35°22′31″N 94°24′38″W
- Area: less than one acre
- Built: 1960
- Architect: Harold Eugene Adams
- NRHP reference No.: 14000796
- Added to NRHP: September 30, 2014

The Harold Adams Office Building is a historic commercial building at 2101 South H Street in Fort Smith, Arkansas. It is a single-story Mid-century modern office building, designed by the regionally prominent architect Harold Eugene Adams, one of the first architects to graduate from the architecture department of the University of Arkansas at Fayetteville, for use as his professional office. The office is a high-quality small-scale example of his work, which it was designed to showcase.

The building was listed on the National Register of Historic Places in 2014.

== See also ==
- National Register of Historic Places listings in Sebastian County, Arkansas
