= Dr. Neil Crow Sr. House =

Historic house in Arkansas, United States

- U.S. National Register of Historic Places
- Location within Arkansas Location within the United States
- Location: 19 Berry Hill Rd., Fort Smith, Arkansas
- Coordinates: 35°21′28″N 94°23′6″W
- Area: 2.5 acres (1.0 ha)
- Built: 1967
- Architect: John G. Williams
- Architectural style: Mid-Century Modern
- NRHP reference No.: 100002956
- Added to NRHP: September 18, 2018

The Dr. Neil Crow Sr. House is a historic house at 19 Berry Hill Road in Fort Smith, Arkansas. Completed in 1968, it is a good local example of residential Mid-Century Modern architecture. It was designed by John G. Williams, founder of the University of Arkansas's school of architecture. The house has signature elements of the style, including deep overhanging eaves, unusual window placements, and the use of a variety of materials on the exterior.

The house was listed on the National Register of Historic Places in 1979.

== See also ==
- National Register of Historic Places listings in Sebastian County, Arkansas
