= South Side Baptist Church =

Historic church in Arkansas, United States

- U.S. National Register of Historic Places
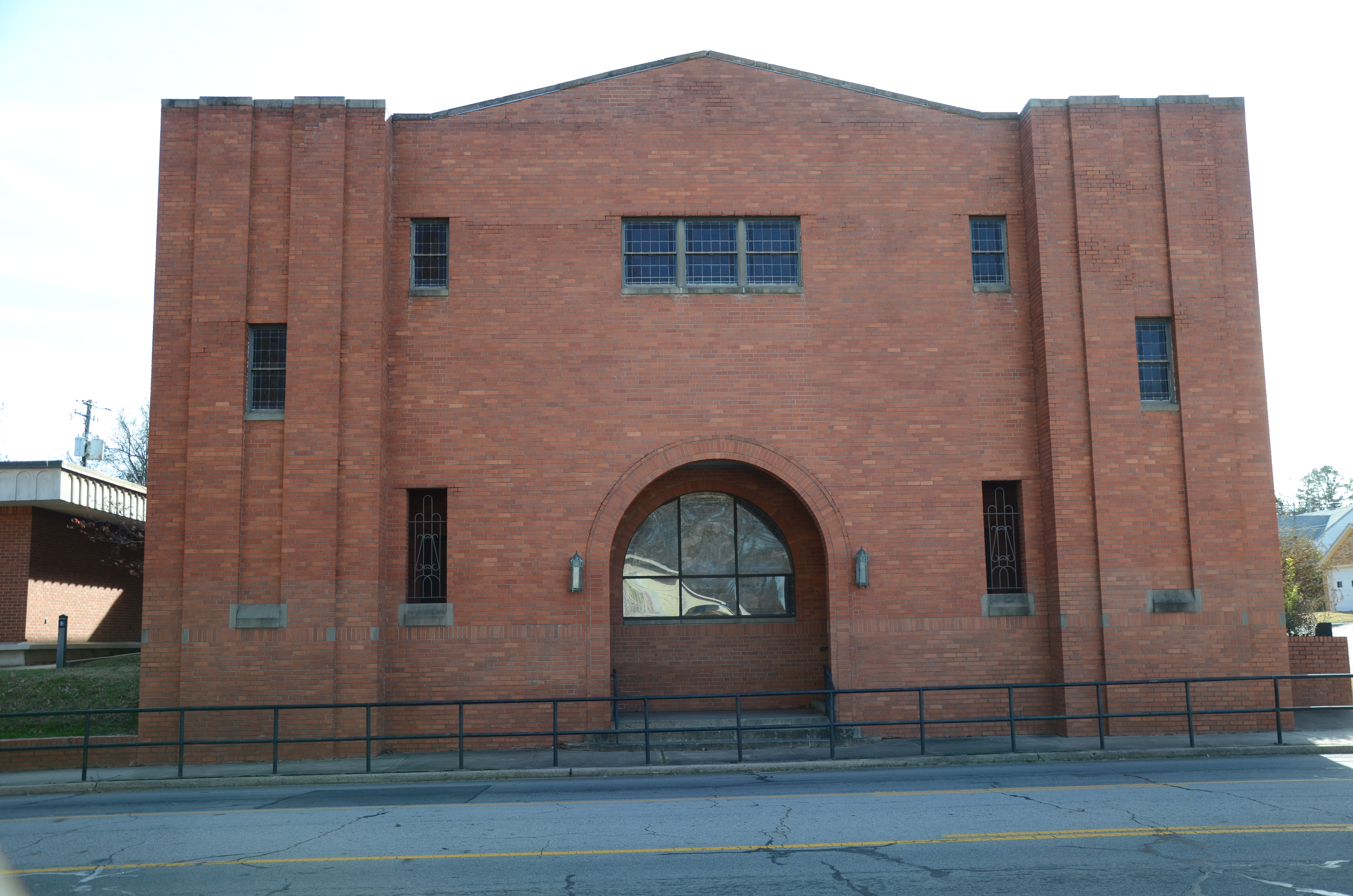

- Location within Arkansas Location within the United States
- Location: 2400 Dodson Ave., Fort Smith, Arkansas
- Coordinates: 35°22′19″N 94°24′24″W
- Area: less than one acre
- Built: 1948
- Architectural style: Moderne
- NRHP reference No.: 06000083
- Added to NRHP: March 2, 2006

South Side Baptist Church is a historic Southern Baptist church at 2400 Dodson Avenue in Fort Smith, Arkansas. It is a large two-story brick building, built in 1948 with Moderne styling. The main facade is symmetrically arranged, with its entrances recessed to the sides of a round Romanesque arch, whose rear wall presents a round-arch window. Narrow windows and projecting corner sections relieve the mass of brickwork, with the corner sections providing vertical emphasis with piers and rising the height of the building. The building is a rare local example of the Moderne style. It is used by the church for educational facilities.

The building was listed on the National Register of Historic Places in 2006.

== See also ==
- National Register of Historic Places in Sebastian County, Arkansas
