= First Evangelical Lutheran Church (Fort Smith, Arkansas) =

Historic church in Arkansas, United States

- U.S. National Register of Historic Places
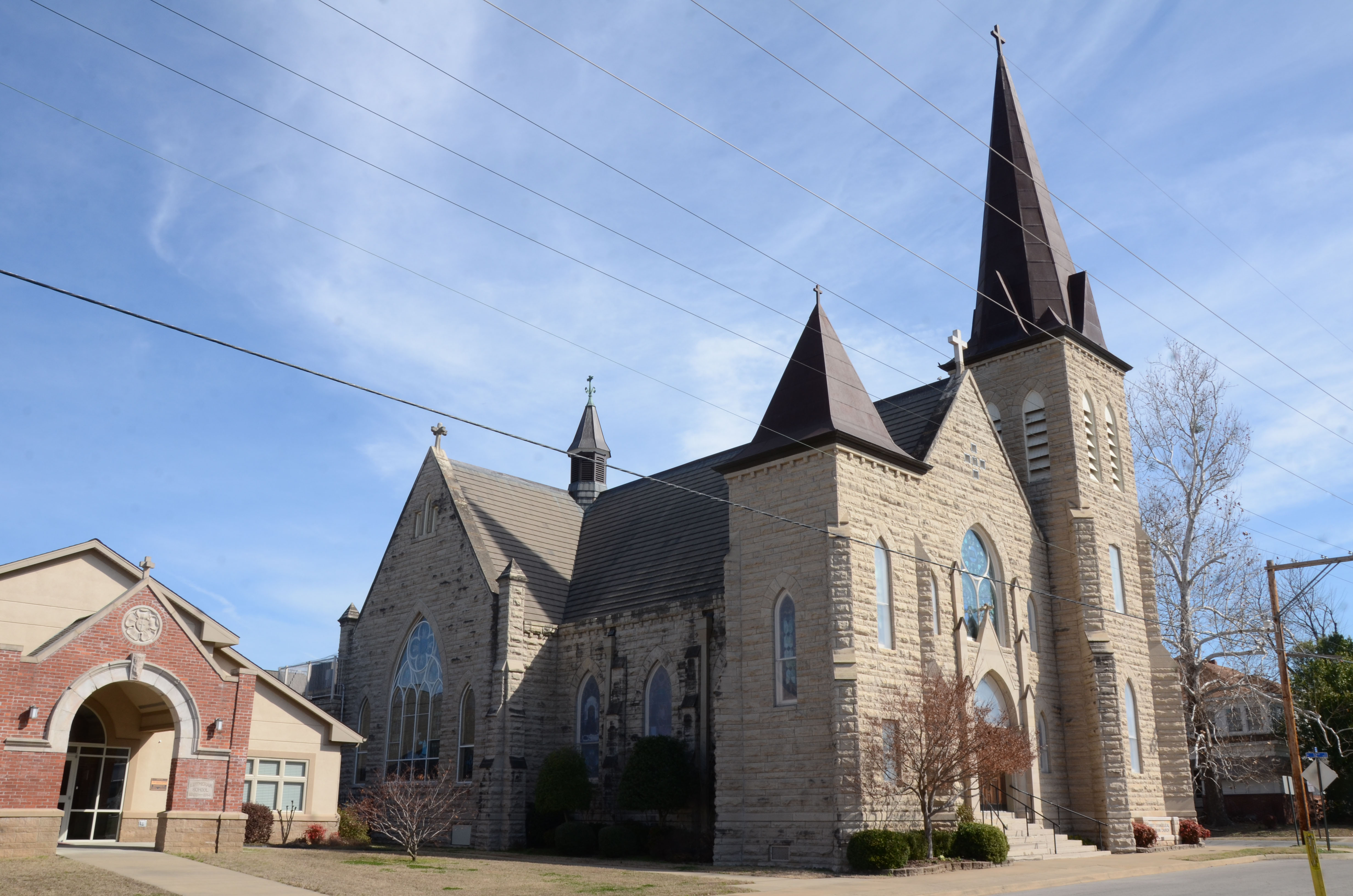

- Location within Arkansas Location within the United States
- Location: 1115 N. D St., Fort Smith, Arkansas
- Coordinates: 35°23′3″N 94°24′6″W
- Area: less than one acre
- Built: 1901
- Architect: William Hornor Blakely
- Architectural style: Late Gothic Revival
- NRHP reference No.: 100000558
- Added to NRHP: January 24, 2017

The First Evangelical Lutheran Church is a historic church building at 1115 North D Street in Fort Smith, Arkansas. It is a large limestone structure, built in a cruciform plan with a pair of towers flanking its main facade. It was built in 1901–04 to a design by William Hornor Blakely, a prominent local architect. The congregation for which it was built was formally established in 1852 by German immigrants to the area. Its first church, completed in 1869, stood nearby, and was converted to educational use by the congregation.

The building was listed on the National Register of Historic Places in 2017.

== See also ==
- National Register of Historic Places listings in Sebastian County, Arkansas
