= Hartford Commercial Historic District =

Historic district in Arkansas, United States

- U.S. National Register of Historic Places
- U.S. Historic district
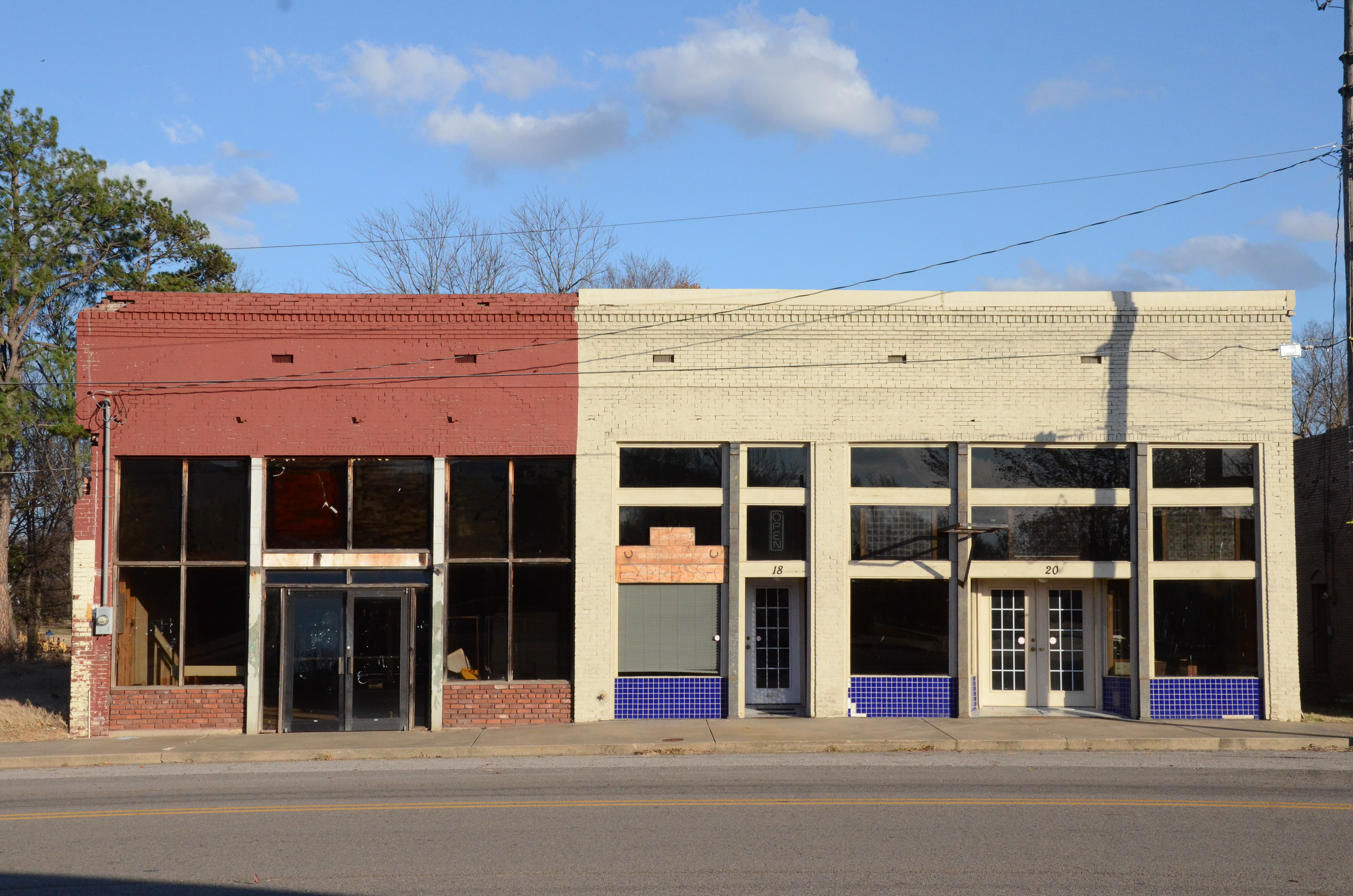

- Location within Arkansas Location within the United States
- Location: Buildings on the E. side of Broadway St. from 12 N. Broadway to 106 S. Broadway, Hartford, Arkansas
- Coordinates: 35°1′27″N 94°22′52″W
- Area: less than one acre
- Architectural style: Early Commercial
- NRHP reference No.: 09000514
- Added to NRHP: July 15, 2009

The Hartford Commercial Historic District encompasses about two blocks of buildings in the central business district of Hartford, Arkansas. Extending on the east side of Broadway from just north of Main Street to south of Ludlow Street, they are the only major commercial buildings left from Hartford's boom years of 1880–1920, when coal in the area was mined for use by the railroads. Most of the buildings are single-story brick structures, in typical early-20th-century commercial styles. Included in the district is Hartford's present city hall, which was built in 1910 as a theater.

The district was listed on the National Register of Historic Places in 2009.

== See also ==
- National Register of Historic Places listings in Sebastian County, Arkansas
