= Angus McLeod House =

Historic house in Arkansas, United States

- Formerly listed on the U.S. National Register of Historic Places
- Location within Arkansas Location within the United States
- Location: 912 N. 13th St., Fort Smith, Arkansas
- Coordinates: 35°23′20″N 94°24′45″W
- Area: less than one acre
- Built: 1904
- Architectural style: Classical Revival
- NRHP reference No.: 78000632

Significant dates
- Added to NRHP: December 8, 1978
- Removed from NRHP: January 26, 2018

The Angus McLeod House was a historic house at 912 North 13th Street in Fort Smith, Arkansas. Built in 1905, it was a handsome Classical Revival structure, built out of pink brick with a stone foundation, that rose to include piers for an elaborate front portico supported by Corinthian columns. The house was one of the most expensive and elaborate built in Fort Smith at the time, with interior decoration matching its exterior in lavish detail. The house was listed on the National Register of Historic Places in 1978; it was destroyed by fire in July 2010, and was delisted in 2018.

== See also ==
- National Register of Historic Places listings in Sebastian County, Arkansas
