= Echols Memorial Christian Church =

Historic church in Arkansas, United States

- U.S. National Register of Historic Places
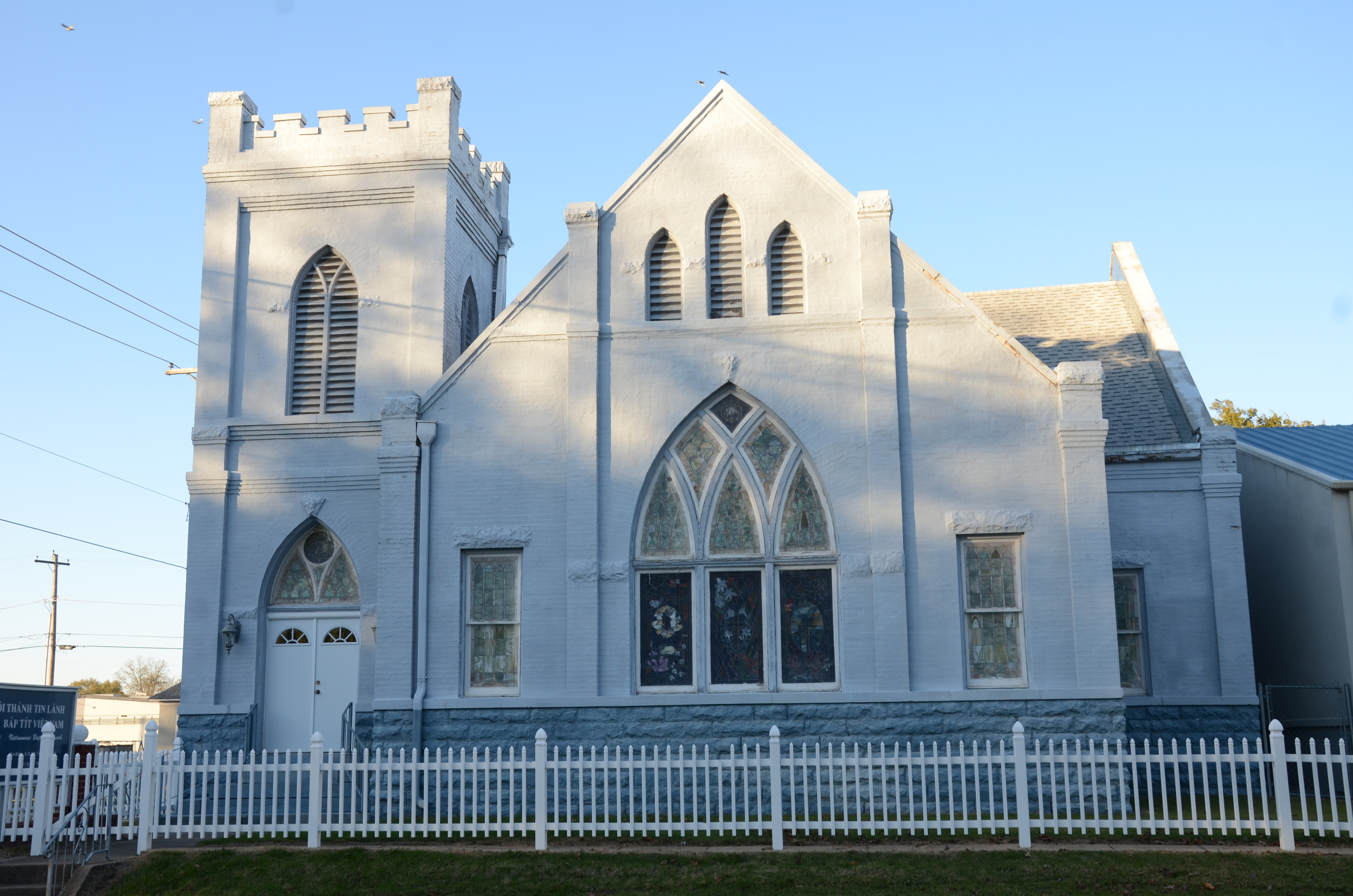
- Front of the church

- Location within Arkansas Location within the United States
- Location: 2801 Alabama, Fort Smith, Arkansas
- Coordinates: 35°23′3″N 94°24′6″W
- Area: less than one acre
- Built: 1911
- Architectural style: Late Gothic Revival
- NRHP reference No.: 06000070
- Added to NRHP: February 21, 2006

The Echols Memorial Christian Church, now home to the Vietnamese Baptist Church, is a historic church building at 2801 Alabama Avenue in Fort Smith, Arkansas. It is a large rectangular brick and stone structure, with a square tower at its southwest corner. Its roof has a cross gable configuration, with large Gothic stained-glass in the gable ends. The main entrance is set in the tower recessed in a Gothic-arched opening. Built in 1911 with funds donated by Mrs. Elizabeth Echols, it is an excellent local example of Late Gothic styling built using local materials.

The building was listed on the National Register of Historic Places in 2006.

== See also ==
- National Register of Historic Places listings in Sebastian County, Arkansas
