= Greenwood Gymnasium =

- U.S. National Register of Historic Places
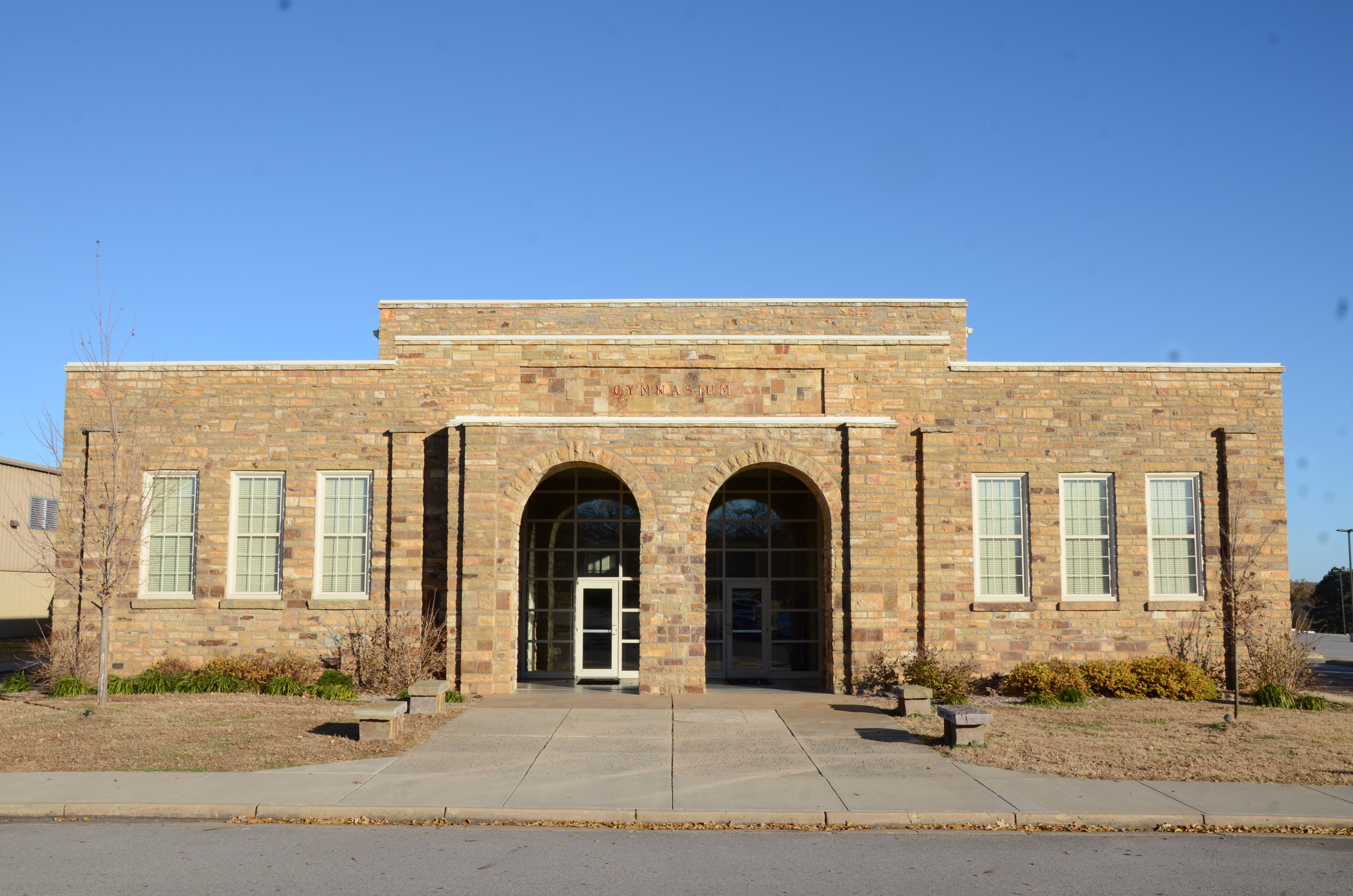

- Location within Arkansas Location within the United States
- Location: 300 E. Gary St., Greenwood, Arkansas
- Coordinates: 35°13′8″N 94°15′40″W
- Area: less than one acre
- Built by: Works Progress Administration
- NRHP reference No.: 11000357
- Added to NRHP: June 15, 2011

The Greenwood Gymnasium is a historic school building at 300 East Gary Street, on the campus of the Greenwood High School in Greenwood, Arkansas. It is a large brick building, housing two classrooms, a gym space with bleachers and a stage, and locker rooms for boys and girls. Its lobby is accessed via an entrance recessed behind a pair of round arches. The gymnasium was built in 1938–39 with funding from the Works Progress Administration, and is a well-preserved and durable example of that project's work.

The building was listed on the National Register of Historic Places in 2011.

== See also ==
- National Register of Historic Places listings in Sebastian County, Arkansas
