= National Register of Historic Places listings in Sebastian County, Arkansas =

Location of Sebastian County in Arkansas

This is a list of the National Register of Historic Places listings in Sebastian County, Arkansas.

This is intended to be a complete list of the properties and districts on the National Register of Historic Places in Sebastian County, Arkansas, United States. The locations of National Register properties and districts for which the latitude and longitude coordinates are included below, may be seen in a map.

There are 60 properties and districts listed on the National Register in the county, one of which, the Fort Smith National Historic Site, is also a National Historic Landmark District. Another 7 properties were once listed but have been removed.

Contents: Counties in Arkansas
- Arkansas
- Ashley
- Baxter
- Benton
- Boone
- Bradley
- Calhoun
- Carroll
- Chicot
- Clark
- Clay
- Cleburne
- Cleveland
- Columbia
- Conway
- Craighead
- Crawford
- Crittenden
- Cross
- Dallas
- Desha
- Drew
- Faulkner
- Franklin
- Fulton
- Garland
- Grant
- Greene
- Hempstead
- Hot Spring
- Howard
- Independence
- Izard
- Jackson
- Jefferson
- Johnson
- Lafayette
- Lawrence
- Lee
- Lincoln
- Little River
- Logan
- Lonoke
- Madison
- Marion
- Miller
- Mississippi
- Monroe
- Montgomery
- Nevada
- Newton
- Ouachita
- Perry
- Phillips
- Pike
- Poinsett
- Polk
- Pope
- Prairie
- Pulaski (Little Rock)
- Randolph
- St. Francis
- Saline
- Scott
- Searcy
- Sebastian
- Sevier
- Sharp
- Stone
- Union
- Van Buren
- Washington
- White
- Woodruff
- Yell

This National Park Service list is complete through NPS recent listings posted May 1, 2026.

== Current listings ==
	Name on the Register	Image	Date listed	Location	City or town	Description
1	Harold Adams Office Building	Harold Adams Office Building	September 30, 2014 (#14000796)	2101 S. H St. 35°22′31″N 94°24′38″W	Fort Smith	
2	Atkinson-Williams Warehouse	Atkinson-Williams Warehouse	December 13, 1979 (#79000458)	320 Rogers Ave. 35°23′15″N 94°25′42″W	Fort Smith	
3	William Ayers House	William Ayers House	July 8, 1999 (#99000792)	820 N. 12th St. 35°23′56″N 94°24′47″W	Fort Smith	
4	Birney Safety Streetcar No. 224	Birney Safety Streetcar No. 224	May 19, 1994 (#94000465)	100 S. 4th St. 35°23′09″N 94°25′47″W	Fort Smith	
5	Bonneville House	Bonneville House	September 22, 1971 (#71000128)	318 N. 7th St. 35°23′21″N 94°25′14″W	Fort Smith	
6	C.R. Breckinridge House	C.R. Breckinridge House	August 7, 1979 (#79000460)	504 N. 16th St. 35°23′09″N 94°24′47″W	Fort Smith	
7	Camp Chaffee Tank Destroyer Battalion Historic District	Camp Chaffee Tank Destroyer Battalion Historic District	September 23, 2011 (#11000693)	Roughly bounded by Terry St., Ward Ave., Ellis St. & Darby Ave.; Roughly bounded by Ward Ave., RR spur, Taylor Ave. & Terry St. 35°23′09″N 94°24′47″W	Fort Smith	World War II Home Front Efforts in Arkansas, MPS; second set of addresses represents a boundary increase April 6, 2014
8	Oscar Chambers House	Oscar Chambers House	June 7, 2016 (#16000320)	3200 S. Dallas St. 35°21′11″N 94°23′57″W	Fort Smith	
9	Christ the King Church	Christ the King Church	December 22, 1982 (#82000936)	Greenwood Ave. at S. South St. 35°21′53″N 94°24′15″W	Fort Smith	
10	W.H.H. Clayton House	W.H.H. Clayton House	September 4, 1970 (#70000130)	514 N. 6th St. 35°23′30″N 94°25′15″W	Fort Smith	
11	Commercial Hotel	Commercial Hotel	May 7, 1973 (#73000391)	123 N. 1st St. 35°23′24″N 94°25′44″W	Fort Smith	
12	Coop Creek Bridge	Coop Creek Bridge	May 5, 1995 (#95000566)	County Road 236 over Coop Creek; 35°03′27″N 94°14′10″W	Mansfield	
13	Dr. Neil Crow Sr. House		September 18, 2018 (#100002956)	19 Berry Hill Rd. 35°21′28″N 94°23′06″W	Fort Smith	
14	Dodson Avenue Methodist Episcopal Church	Dodson Avenue Methodist Episcopal Church	March 2, 2006 (#06000082)	1922 Dodson Ave. 35°22′19″N 94°24′45″W	Fort Smith	
15	Echols Memorial Christian Church	Echols Memorial Christian Church	February 21, 2006 (#06000070)	2801 Alabama; 35°23′03″N 94°24′06″W	Fort Smith	
16	Elmwood Cemetery	Elmwood Cemetery	January 26, 2018 (#100002004)	SW of intersection of Zero & S 24th Sts. 35°19′39″N 94°24′44″W	Fort Smith	
17	Ferguson-Calderara House		December 11, 1979 (#79000461)	214 N. 14th St. 35°23′01″N 94°25′00″W	Fort Smith	Note: The house is listed under the wrong address. The actual address is 211 N. 14th.
18	First Evangelical Lutheran Church	First Evangelical Lutheran Church	January 24, 2017 (#100000558)	1115 N. D St. 35°23′13″N 94°25′00″W	Fort Smith	
19	Fishback Neighborhood Historic District	Fishback Neighborhood Historic District	September 23, 2010 (#10000780)	Roughly bounded by Rogers, Greenwood, and Dodson Aves. and 31st St.; also roughly bounded by Rogers & Dodson Aves., S. 24th, S. 26th & J Sts. 35°22′25″N 94°24′05″W	Fort Smith	Second set of addresses represents a boundary increase February 3, 2015
20	Fitzgerald Historic District	Fitzgerald Historic District	January 26, 2018 (#100002005)	Roughly bounded by Rogers & Dodson Aves., S I, S 22nd & S 25th Sts. 35°22′32″N 94°24′28″W	Fort Smith	
21	Fort Smith Masonic Temple	Fort Smith Masonic Temple	November 20, 1992 (#92001624)	200 N. 11th St. 35°23′09″N 94°25′06″W	Fort Smith	
22	Fort Smith National Cemetery	Fort Smith National Cemetery	May 20, 1999 (#99000578)	522 Garland Ave. and S. 6th St. 35°22′59″N 94°25′43″W	Fort Smith	
23	Fort Smith National Historic Site	Fort Smith National Historic Site	October 15, 1966 (#66000202)	Southern side of Garland Avenue; 35°23′17″N 94°25′52″W	Fort Smith	
24	Fort Smith US Post Office and Courthouse	Fort Smith US Post Office and Courthouse	December 13, 1999 (#99001406)	30 S. 6th St. 35°23′10″N 94°25′36″W	Fort Smith	
25	Fort Smith's Belle Grove Historic District	Fort Smith's Belle Grove Historic District	July 16, 1973 (#73000392)	Bounded by N. 4th, N. 9th, N. B, and N. H Sts. 35°23′27″N 94°25′15″W	Fort Smith	
26	Ft. Smith Confederate Monument	Ft. Smith Confederate Monument	April 26, 1996 (#96000460)	Courthouse Lawn, near the junction of 6th St. and Rogers Ave. 35°23′14″N 94°25′40″W	Fort Smith	
27	Greenwood Gymnasium	Greenwood Gymnasium	June 15, 2011 (#11000357)	300 E. Gary St. 35°13′08″N 94°15′40″W	Greenwood	New Deal Recovery Efforts in Arkansas MPS
28	Greenwood Presbyterian Church	Greenwood Presbyterian Church	October 1, 2008 (#08000955)	103 W. Denver St. 35°12′57″N 94°15′28″W	Greenwood	
29	Hackett Creek Bridge	Hackett Creek Bridge	May 5, 1995 (#95000568)	Highway 45 over Hackett Creek; 35°11′35″N 94°24′51″W	Hackett	
30	Robert Atlas Harper House	Robert Atlas Harper House	June 2, 2000 (#00000612)	201 N. Main St. 35°12′58″N 94°15′22″W	Greenwood	
31	Hartford Commercial Historic District	Hartford Commercial Historic District	July 15, 2009 (#09000514)	Buildings on the eastern side of Broadway St. from 12 N. Broadway to 106 S. Broadway; 35°01′21″N 94°22′53″W	Hartford	
32	Hartford Water Tower	Hartford Water Tower	January 24, 2008 (#07001434)	Pine and 1st. Sts. 35°01′30″N 94°22′37″W	Hartford	
33	Jewish Cemetery	Jewish Cemetery	May 12, 2021 (#100006538)	1601 South H St. 35°22′32″N 94°25′48″W	Fort Smith	
33	Jones Memorial Methodist Church	Jones Memorial Methodist Church	January 21, 2011 (#10001157)	400 E. Main St. 35°01′22″N 94°22′38″W	Hartford	
34	Joseph Knoble Brewery	Joseph Knoble Brewery	March 24, 1972 (#72000209)	N. 3rd and E Sts. 35°23′33″N 94°25′22″W	Fort Smith	
35	Maness Schoolhouse	Maness Schoolhouse	May 29, 2003 (#03000466)	8801 Wells Lake Rd. 35°17′50″N 94°20′05″W	Barling	
36	Maumelle Ordnance Works Locomotive #1	Maumelle Ordnance Works Locomotive #1	September 20, 2006 (#06000835)	100 S. 4th St. 35°23′11″N 94°25′52″W	Fort Smith	
37	May-Lecta-Sweet Historic District	May-Lecta-Sweet Historic District	July 2, 2008 (#08000597)	Roughly bounded by May Ave., Rogers Ave., Sweet Ave., and Kinkead Ave. 35°22′43″N 94°24′03″W	Fort Smith	
38	Milltown Bridge	Milltown Bridge	April 6, 1990 (#90000527)	County Road 77, 1.5 miles west of Milltown; 35°09′30″N 94°10′26″W	Milltown	
39	William J. Murphy House	William J. Murphy House	August 7, 1979 (#79000462)	923 N. 13th St. 35°23′21″N 94°24′44″W	Fort Smith	
40	New Theatre	New Theatre	November 18, 1999 (#99001351)	9 N. 10th St. 35°23′07″N 94°25′18″W	Fort Smith	
41	Oak Cemetery	Oak Cemetery	June 2, 1995 (#95000665)	Southeast of the junction of Greenwood and Dodson Aves. 35°22′09″N 94°24′05″W	Fort Smith	
42	Old Arkansas 22, Barling Segment	Old Arkansas 22, Barling Segment	May 22, 2007 (#07000439)	Mayo Rd. 35°20′30″N 94°18′56″W	Barling	
43	Old Huntington Jail	Old Huntington Jail	September 24, 2008 (#08000944)	223 E. Broadway St. 35°04′56″N 94°15′43″W	Huntington	
44	Old Sebastian County Jail	Old Sebastian County Jail	December 1, 1994 (#94001413)	Highway 10, east of the County Courthouse; 35°12′43″N 94°15′16″W	Greenwood	
45	Old US 71-Jenny Lind Segment	Old US 71-Jenny Lind Segment	September 23, 2009 (#09000738)	Doraul Acres Ln. and part of Mt. Nebo Rd. west of U.S. Route 71; 35°13′51″N 94°19′04″W	Jenny Lind	
46	Horace Franklin Rogers House	Horace Franklin Rogers House	May 2, 1979 (#79000463)	2900 Rogers Ave. 35°22′32″N 94°24′00″W	Fort Smith	
47	St. Louis San Francisco (Frisco) Railway Steam Locomotive #4003	St. Louis San Francisco (Frisco) Railway Steam Locomotive #4003	July 12, 2004 (#04000500)	100 S. 4th St. 35°23′07″N 94°25′47″W	Fort Smith	
48	Saint Scholastica Convent	Saint Scholastica Convent	March 2, 2006 (#06000084)	1301 S. Albert Pike; 35°22′17″N 94°23′03″W	Fort Smith	
49	Sebastian County Courthouse-Ft. Smith City Hall	Sebastian County Courthouse-Ft. Smith City Hall	June 8, 1993 (#93000484)	100 S. 6th St. 35°23′08″N 94°25′34″W	Fort Smith	
50	Sebastian County Road 4G Bridge	Sebastian County Road 4G Bridge	May 5, 1995 (#95000569)	County Road 4G over a tributary of Sugar Loaf Creek; 34°59′26″N 94°25′08″W	West Hartford	Two-span reinforced concrete bridge from 1940
51	Tillman Shaw House	Tillman Shaw House	May 16, 1988 (#88000561)	500 S. 19th St. 35°22′44″N 94°24′47″W	Fort Smith	
52	South Side Baptist Church	South Side Baptist Church	March 2, 2006 (#06000083)	2400 Dodson Ave. 35°22′19″N 94°24′24″W	Fort Smith	
53	James Sparks House	James Sparks House	September 14, 1972 (#72000210)	201 N. 14th St. 35°23′08″N 94°24′55″W	Fort Smith	
54	Spirit of the American Doughboy Monument-Fort Smith	Spirit of the American Doughboy Monument-Fort Smith	May 23, 1997 (#97000454)	4901 Midland Ave. 35°25′31″N 94°22′32″W	Fort Smith	
55	State Highway 96 Bridge	State Highway 96 Bridge	May 5, 1995 (#95000564)	Highway 96 over a tributary of Vache Grasse Creek; 35°13′08″N 94°13′16″W	Greenwood	
56	United Hebrew Congregation Tilles Memorial Temple		January 11, 2021 (#100006035)	126 North 47th St. 35°22′32″N 94°22′47″W	Fort Smith	
57	United States Air Force Locomotive #1246	United States Air Force Locomotive #1246	September 20, 2006 (#06000840)	100 S. 4th St. 35°23′09″N 94°25′52″W	Fort Smith	
58	Robert Wanslow House	Robert Wanslow House	January 26, 2018 (#100002007)	2815 S Q St. 35°21′57″N 94°24′07″W	Fort Smith	
59	West Garrison Avenue Historic District	West Garrison Avenue Historic District	April 26, 1979 (#79000464)	100-525 Garrison Ave.; also roughly bounded by 13th St., N. B, 1st St., and Parker Ave. 35°23′18″N 94°25′37″W	Fort Smith	Second set of boundaries represents a boundary increase of June 6, 2001

== Former listings ==
	Name on the Register	Image	Date listed	Date removed	Location	City or town	Description
1	Karl Edward Bracht House		May 2, 1979 (#79000459)	October 18, 2002	315 N. 13th St. 35°23′05″N 94°24′59″W	Fort Smith	Demolished in or before 2009
2	Josiah Foster Building		January 20, 1978 (#78000631)	September 14, 2002	222 Garrison Avenue; 35°23′21″N 94°25′42″W	Fort Smith	Damaged by an F3 tornado on April 21, 1996. Destroyed by fire in 1997 during renovations.
3	Jenny Lind Bridge	Jenny Lind Bridge	April 6, 1990 (#90000530)	September 24, 2004	Howard Hill School Road	Jenny Lind vicinity	
4	Angus McLeod House		December 8, 1978 (#78000632)	January 26, 2018	912 N. 13th St. 35°23′20″N 94°24′45″W	Fort Smith	House burned on July 7, 2010 and subsequently demolished in 2011
5	Old US 71-Devil's Backbone Segment		May 26, 2004 (#04000488)	January 22, 2009	S. Coker St. from just SW of Stewart Court to current US 71; 35°11′16″N 94°16′00″W	Greenwood	
6	Sebastian County Road 5G Bridge		May 5, 1995 (#95000567)	October 7, 2009	County Road 5G over a tributary of West Creek; 35°00′57″N 94°23′37″W	Hartford	
7	Vache Grasse Creek Bridge		May 5, 1995 (#95000563)	January 14, 2002	Co. Rd. 77A over Vache Grasse Creek	Milltown vicinity	

== See also ==
- List of National Historic Landmarks in Arkansas
- National Register of Historic Places listings in Arkansas
