= Saint Scholastica Convent =

- U.S. National Register of Historic Places
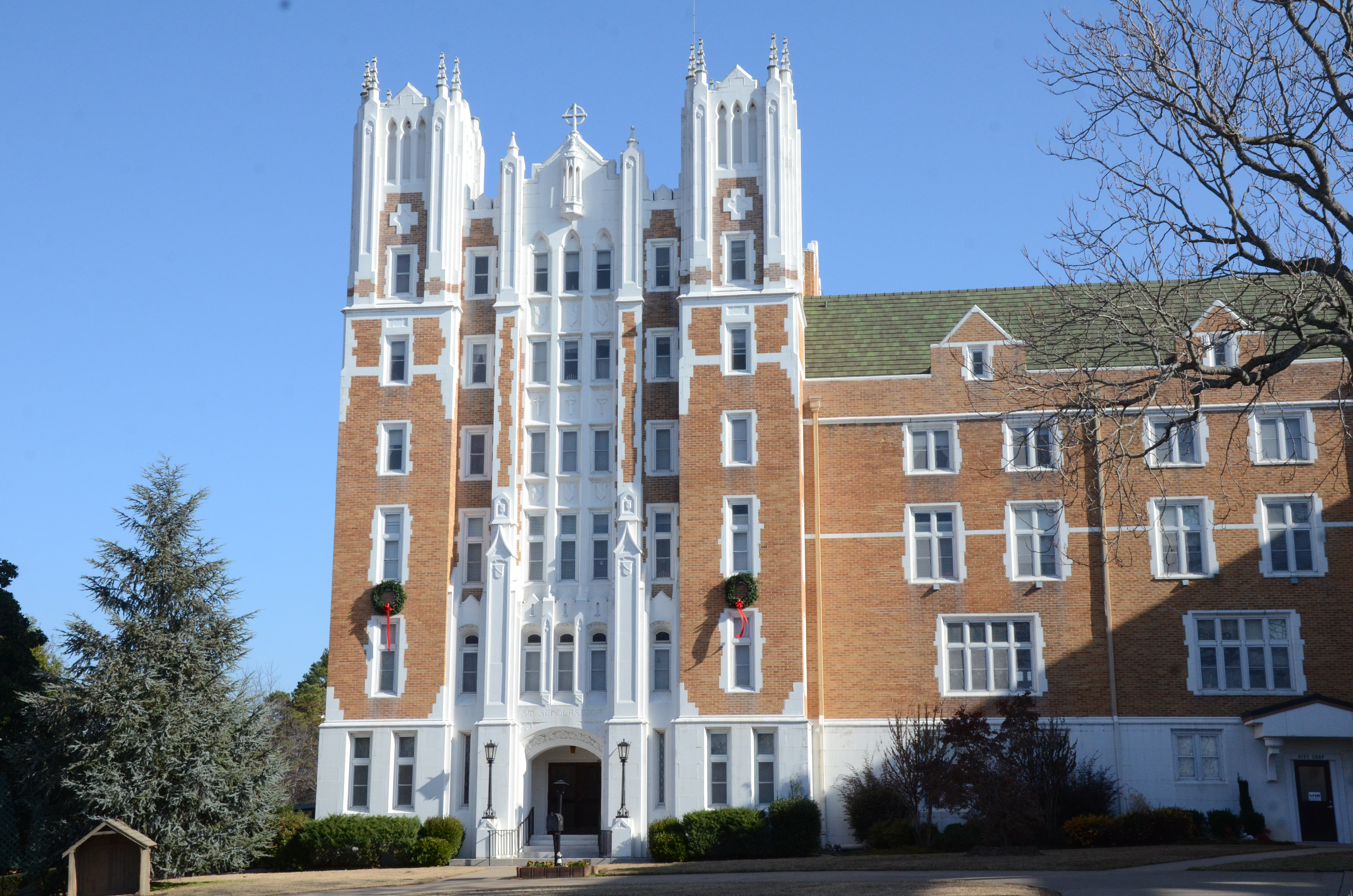

- Location within Arkansas Location within the United States
- Location: 1301 S. Albert Pike, Fort Smith, Arkansas
- Coordinates: 35°22′17″N 94°23′3″W
- Area: 4.8 acres (1.9 ha)
- Architect: F.W. Redlich, Mayors & Scheer
- Architectural style: Late Gothic Revival
- NRHP reference No.: 06000084
- Added to NRHP: March 2, 2006

The Saint Scholastica Convent, now the Saint Scholastica Monastery, is a historic religious facility at 1301 South Albert Pike Avenue in Fort Smith, Arkansas. It is a large multi-winged brick and masonry complex with Late Gothic Revival architecture, five stories in height, set on a large landscaped property behind Trinity Junior High School. The building was designed by Oklahoma City architect F. W. Redlich, and was built in 1923–24. It originally housed living quarters for the convent as well as a chapel and school. In 1952, the chapel was renovated and expanded, including new mosaics by the German artist Peter Recker. The school closed in 1969, and the academic space is now leased to the Trinity School.

The property was listed on the National Register of Historic Places in 2006.

The size of the sisters' community greatly reduced, they left the facility in 2019 to move to a smaller one. As of June 1, 2022 the building is slated for demolition after the sisters made the decision to not move forward with any restoration efforts.

== Gallery of photos ==
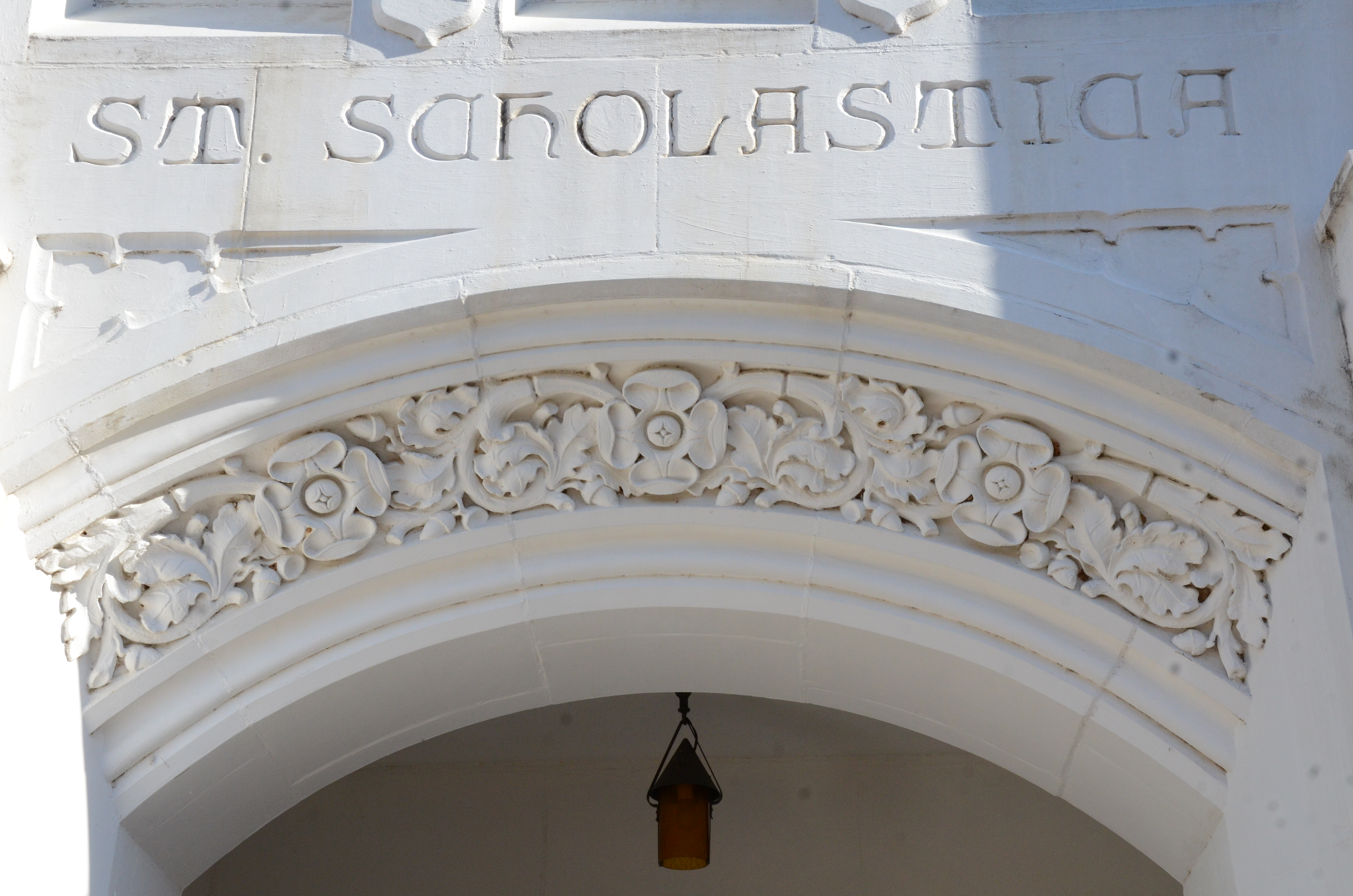
Detail above main entrance

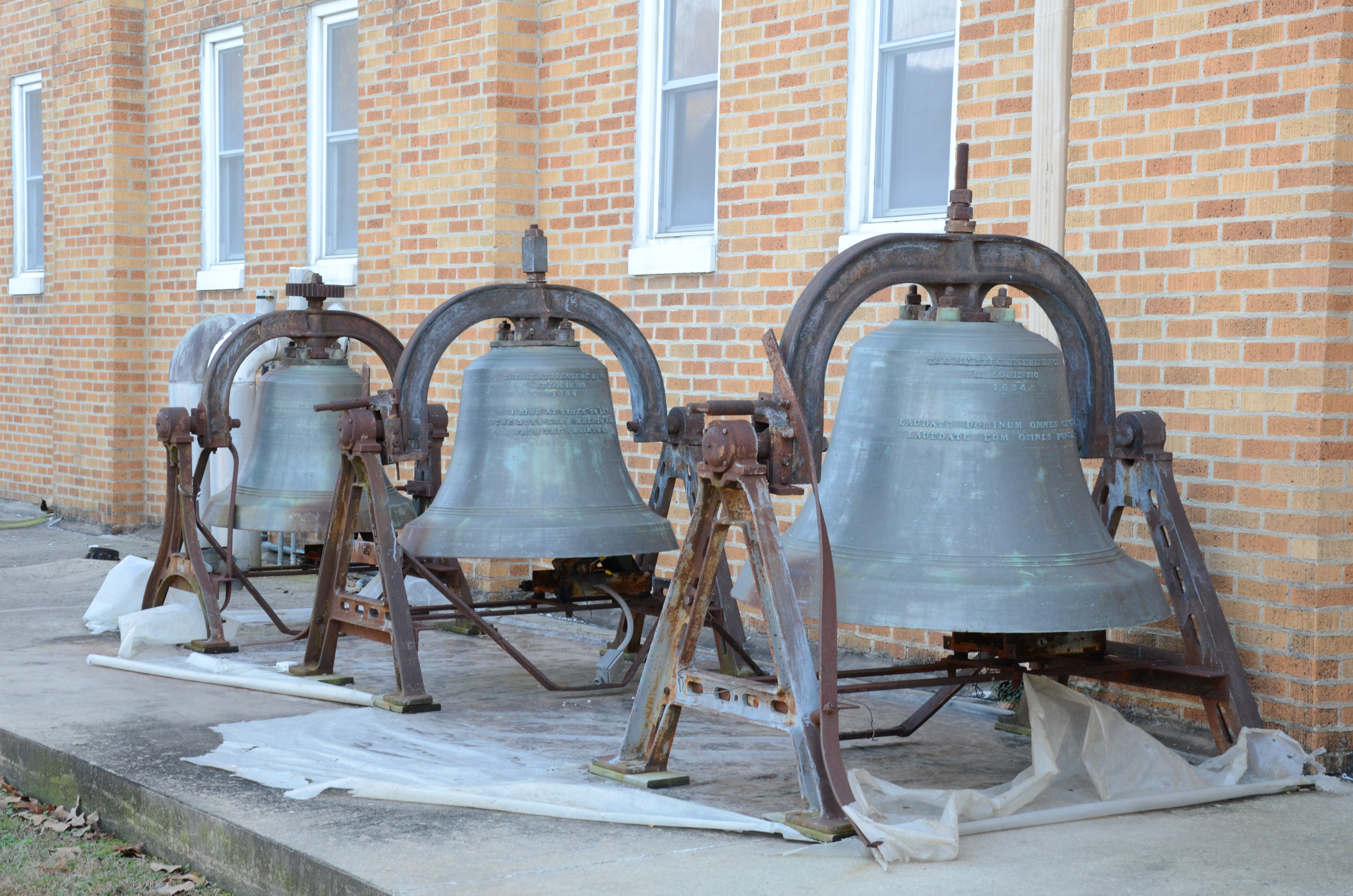
Tower bells removed for maintenance, 2014

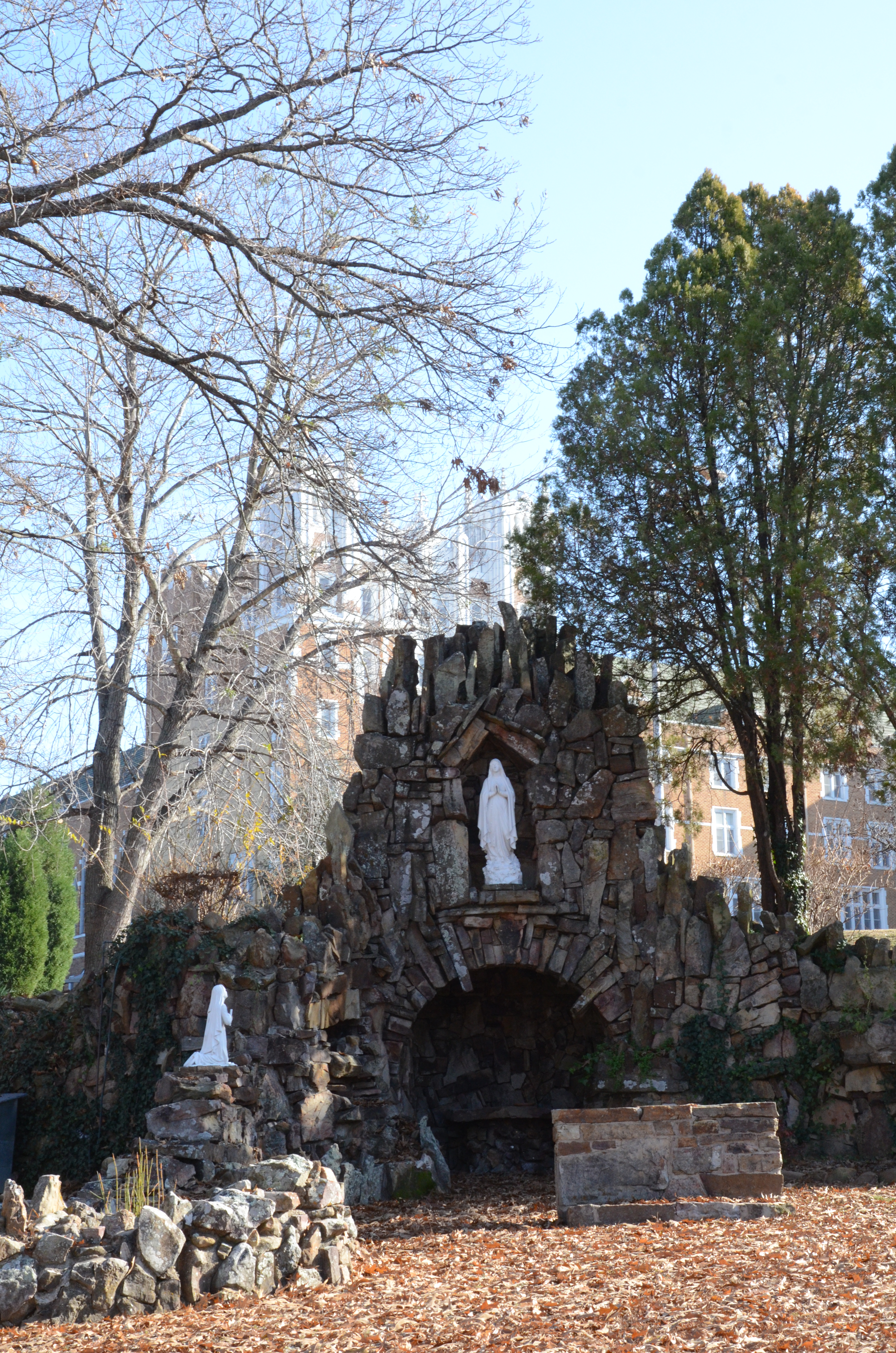
Grotto on convent grounds

== See also ==
- National Register of Historic Places listings in Sebastian County, Arkansas
