= Ferguson-Calderara House =

Historic house in Arkansas, US

- U.S. National Register of Historic Places
- Location within Arkansas Location within the United States
- Location: 214 N. 14th St., Fort Smith, Arkansas
- Coordinates: 35°23′1″N 94°25′0″W
- Area: less than one acre
- Built: 1904
- Architectural style: Colonial Revival
- NRHP reference No.: 79000461
- Added to NRHP: December 11, 1979

The Ferguson-Calderara House is a historic house at 214 North 14th Street in Fort Smith, Arkansas. It is a roughly rectangular 2 1/2-story wood-frame structure, with a high hip roof punctuated by large gables. A single-story hip-roofed porch, supported by round modified Ionic columns with a decorative wooden balustrade between, extends across the front and along one side. The front-facing gable has a Palladian window with diamond lights, and the left side of the second floor front facade has a former porch (now closed in with windows) with decorative pilasters and carved arch moldings. The house was built in 1904 for A. L. Ferguson, owner of one of Fort Smith's largest lumber companies.

The house was listed on the National Register of Historic Places in 1979.

== See also ==
- National Register of Historic Places listings in Sebastian County, Arkansas
