= Maness Schoolhouse =

- U.S. National Register of Historic Places
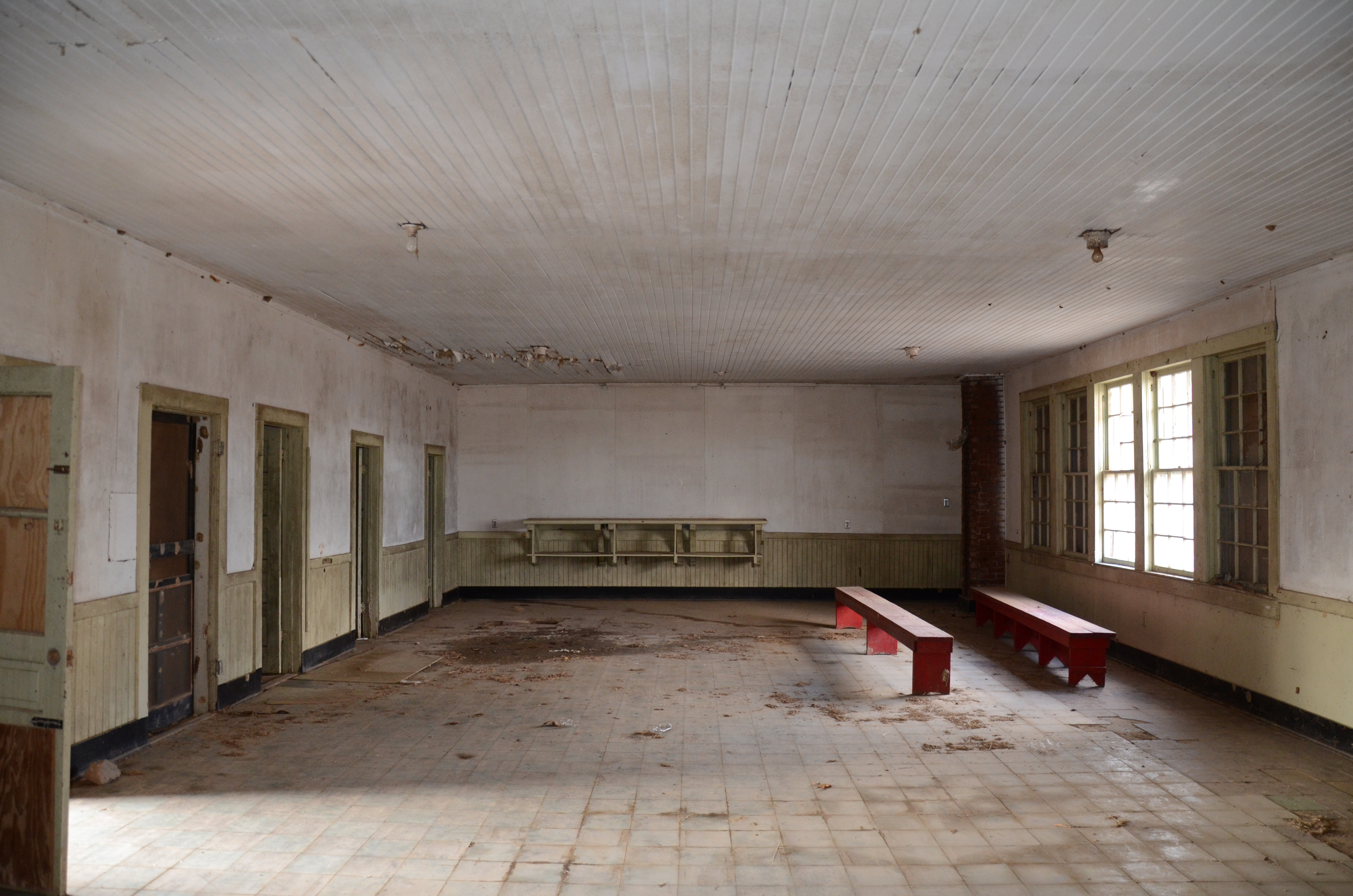

- Location within Arkansas Location within the United States
- Location: 8801 Wells Lake Rd., Barling, Arkansas
- Coordinates: 35°17′50″N 94°20′5″W
- Area: 5.2 acres (2.1 ha)
- Built: 1937
- Built by: Works Progress Administration; Joe Bullington (WPA Stonemason); German Prisoners of War (1943 addition)
- Architectural style: Plain/traditional
- NRHP reference No.: 03000466
- Added to NRHP: May 29, 2003

The Maness Schoolhouse is an American historic school building at 8801 Wells Lake Road in Sebastian County, Arkansas, about 2 miles (3.2 km) south of Barling. It is a single-story stone structure, with a side gable roof and a projecting gable portico over its main entrance. It was built in 1937 as a one-room schoolhouse with funding from the Works Progress Administration, and is the only surviving structure of the former community of Massard, which was disincorporated and demolished to make way for Fort Chaffee in 1941. Its rear porch was built in 1943 by German prisoners of war held at Fort Chaffee.

The building was listed on the National Register of Historic Places in 2003.

== Gallery ==
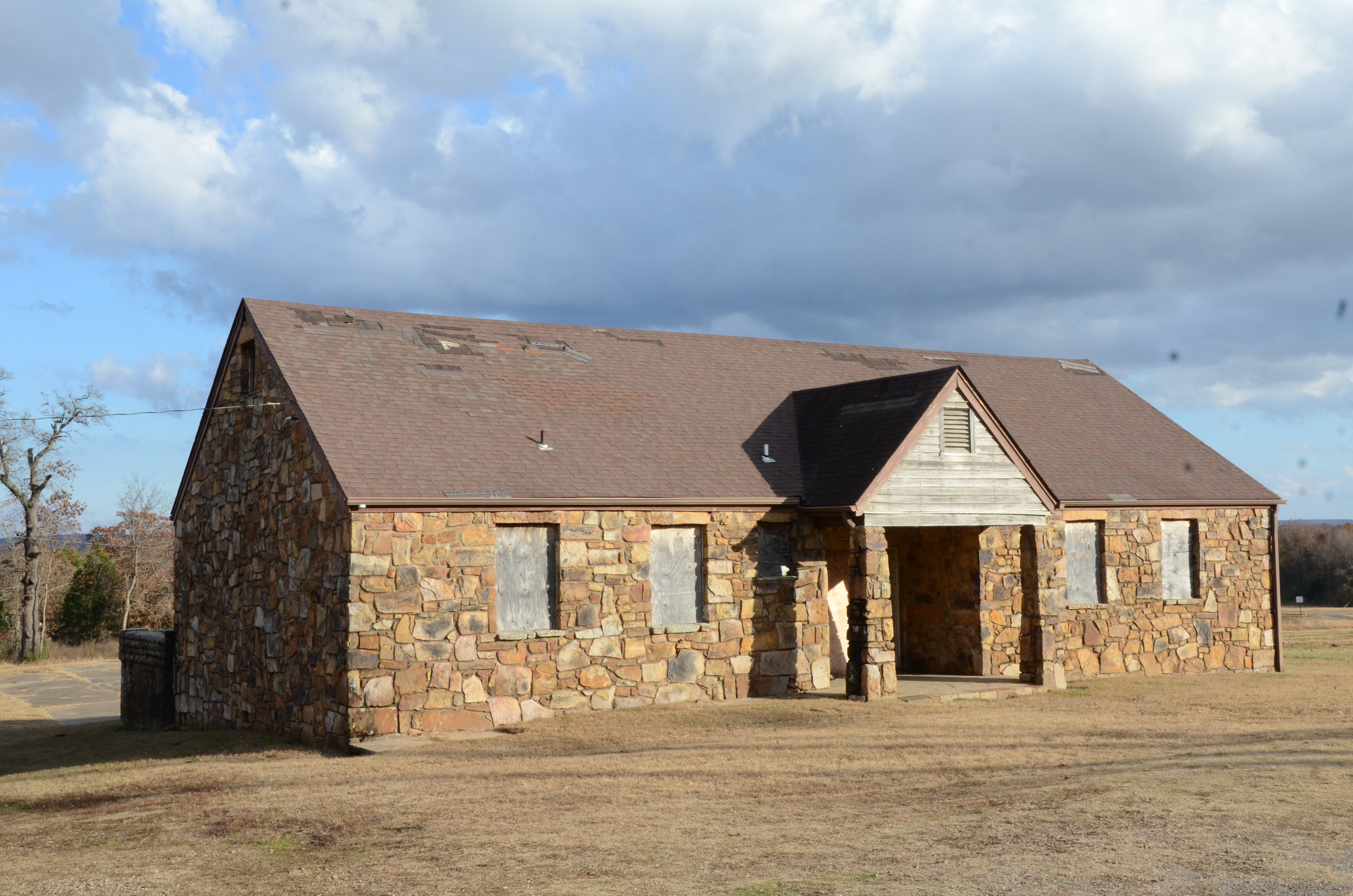
Maness Schoolhouse, front view

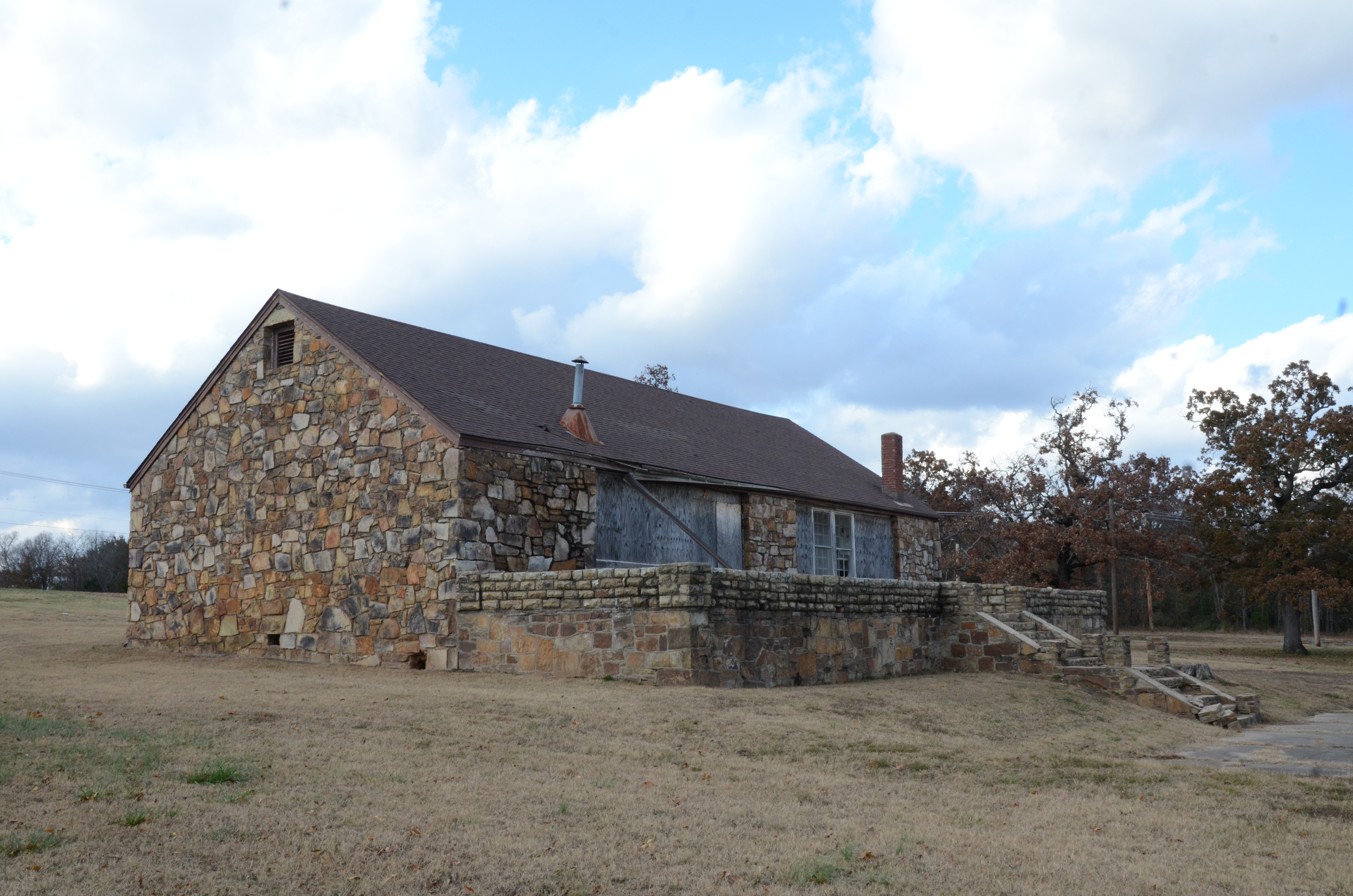
Maness Schoolhouse, rear view

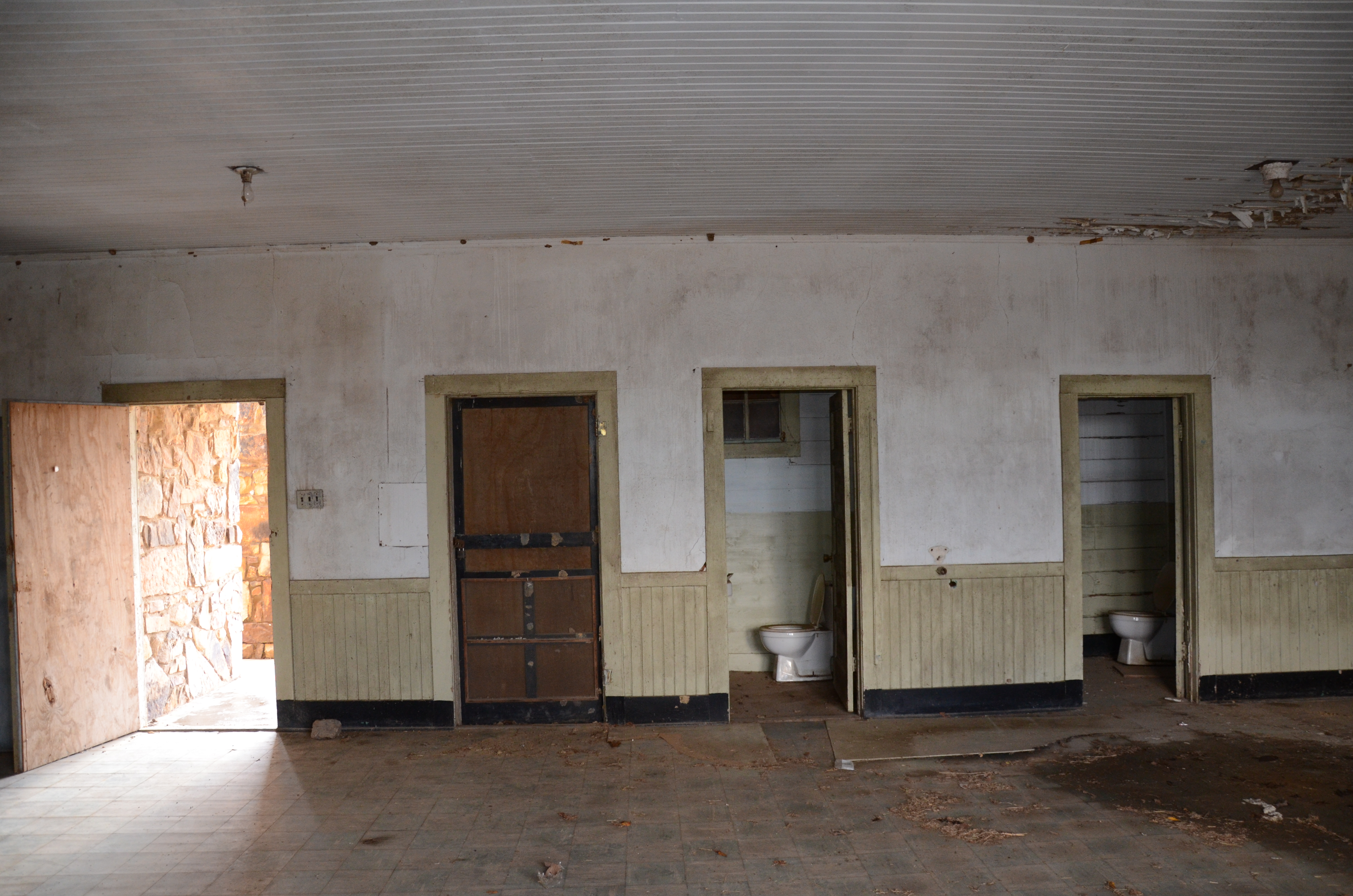
Maness Schoolhouse, interior, looking North

== See also ==
- National Register of Historic Places listings in Sebastian County, Arkansas
