= William J. Murphy House =

Historic house in Arkansas, United States

- U.S. National Register of Historic Places
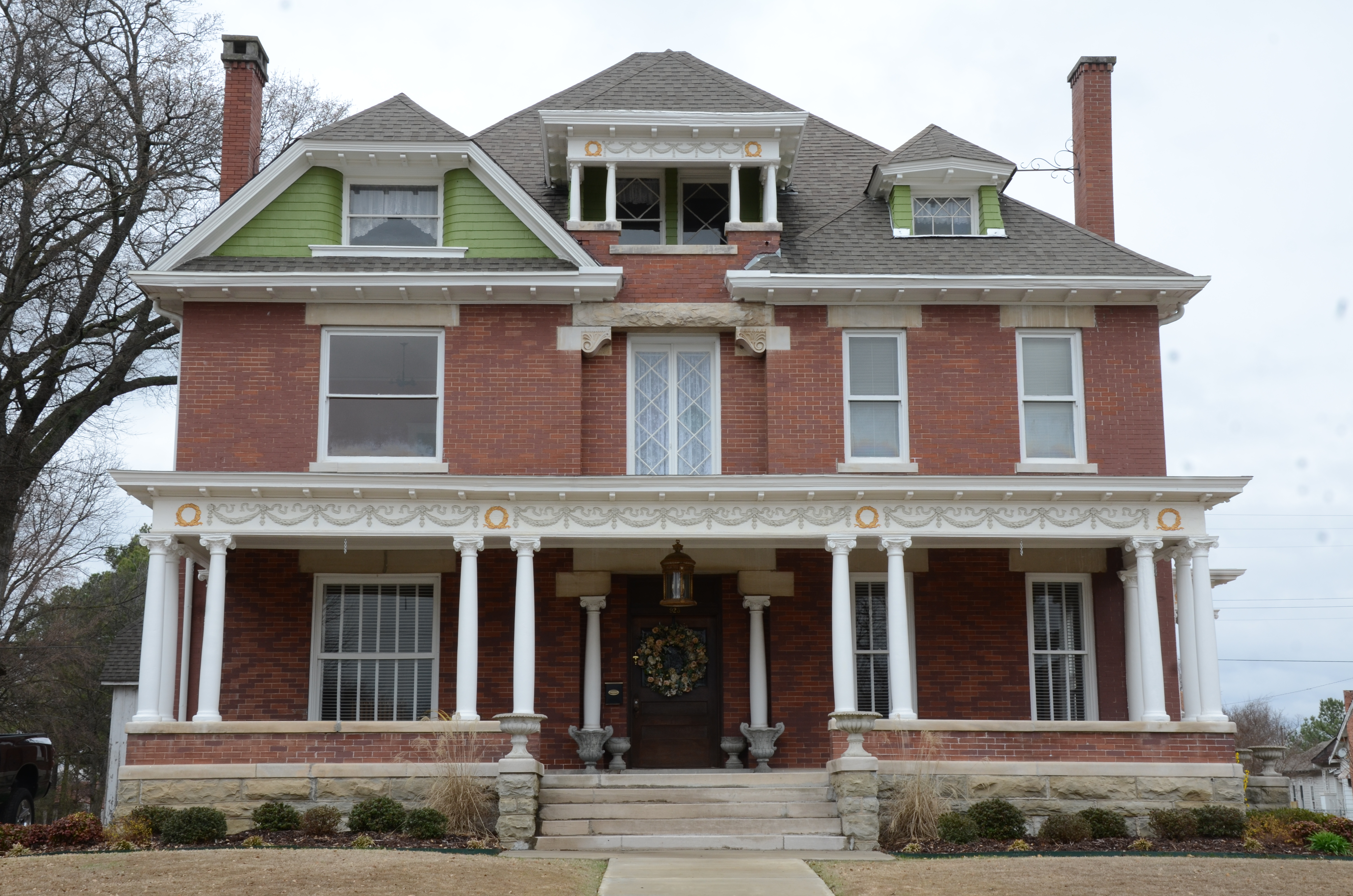

- Location within Arkansas Location within the United States
- Location: 923 N. 13th St., Fort Smith, Arkansas
- Coordinates: 35°23′21″N 94°24′44″W
- Area: less than one acre
- Built: 1895
- Architect: T.T. Reddick
- Architectural style: Classical Revival
- NRHP reference No.: 79000462
- Added to NRHP: August 7, 1979

The William J. Murphy House is a historic house at 923 North 13th Street in Fort Smith, Arkansas, United States. It is a rectangular 2 1/2-story brick structure, with basically symmetrical massing by asymmetric details. The main roofline is hipped toward the front facade, with a pair of similarly sized projections on either side of a central raised hip-roof porch at the third level. The left projection has larger single windows at the first and second levels, and a small window recessed within a jerkin-headed gable pediment. The right projection has two narrower windows on the first and second levels and a small hipped element projecting from the top of that section's hip roof. A single-story porch extends across the width, supported by paired columns, with an entablature decorated by garlands. The house, built about 1895, is one of Fort Smith's most sophisticated expressions of Classical Revival architecture. It was built by a local manufacturer of saddles and harnesses.

The house was listed on the National Register of Historic Places in 1979.

== See also ==
- National Register of Historic Places listings in Sebastian County, Arkansas
