= Christ the King Church (Fort Smith, Arkansas) =

Historic church in Arkansas, United States

- U.S. National Register of Historic Places
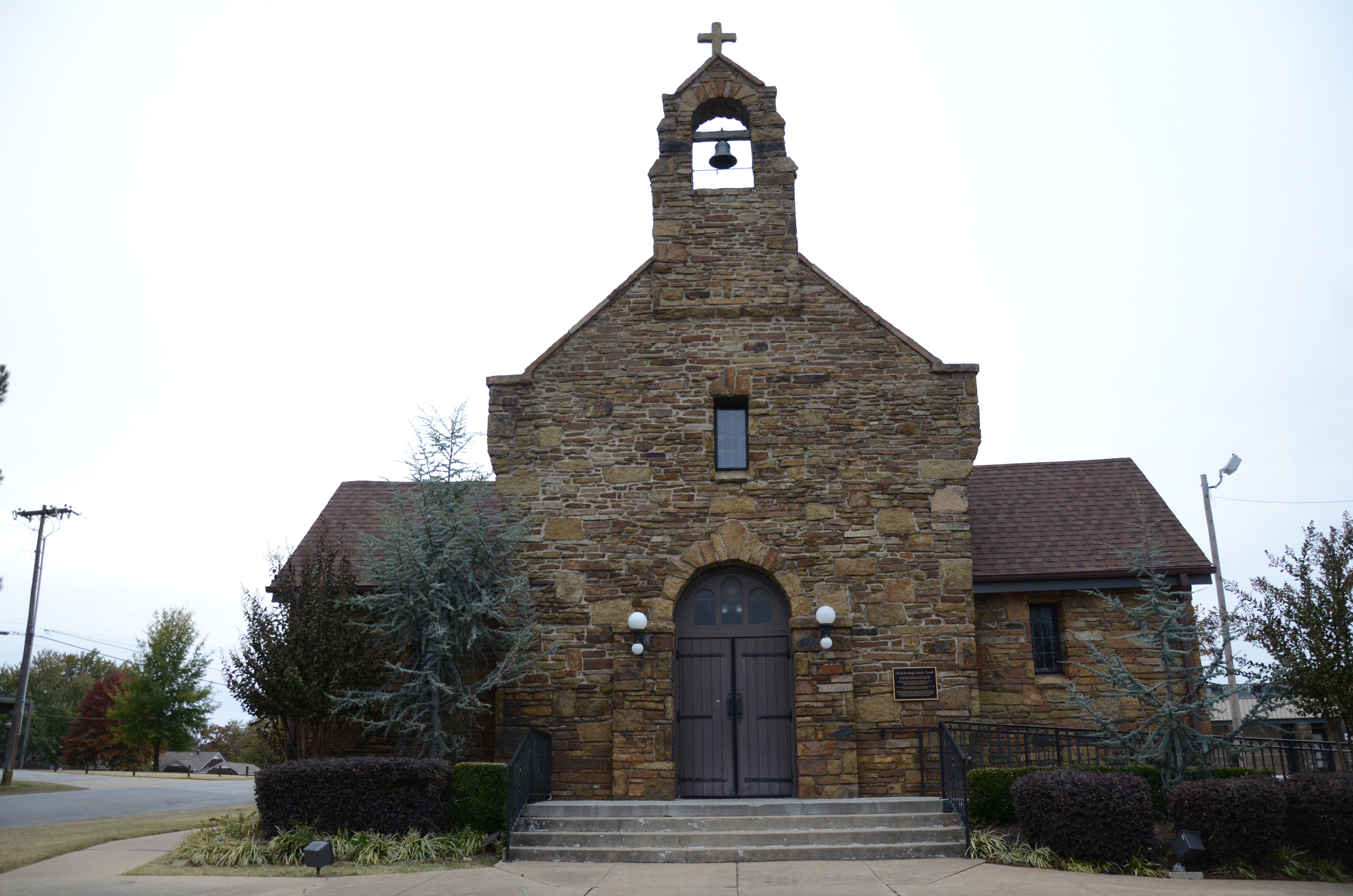
- Front of the church

- Location within Arkansas Location within the United States
- Location: Greenwood Ave. at S. S St., Ft. Smith, Arkansas
- Coordinates: 35°21′53″N 94°24′15″W
- Area: less than one acre
- Built: 1930
- Architect: Thompson, Sanders & Ginocchio
- Architectural style: Mission/Spanish Revival architecture
- MPS: Thompson, Charles L., Design Collection TR
- NRHP reference No.: 82000936
- Added to NRHP: December 22, 1982

The Christ the King Church is a historic church building at Greenwood and South "S" Streets in Fort Smith, Arkansas. It is a Mission/Spanish revival style church built out of native fieldstone in 1930 to a design by Thompson, Sanders & Ginocchio. It is an architecturally distinctive example of the work of Arkansas architect Charles L. Thompson, with transepts located near the front of the building (instead of the more traditional rear), and the angled parapet leading to the open belltower. The building is now used by the parish as an academic facilities.

The building was listed on the National Register of Historic Places in 1982.

== See also ==
- National Register of Historic Places listings in Sebastian County, Arkansas
