= Jones Memorial Methodist Church =

Historic church in Arkansas, United States

- U.S. National Register of Historic Places
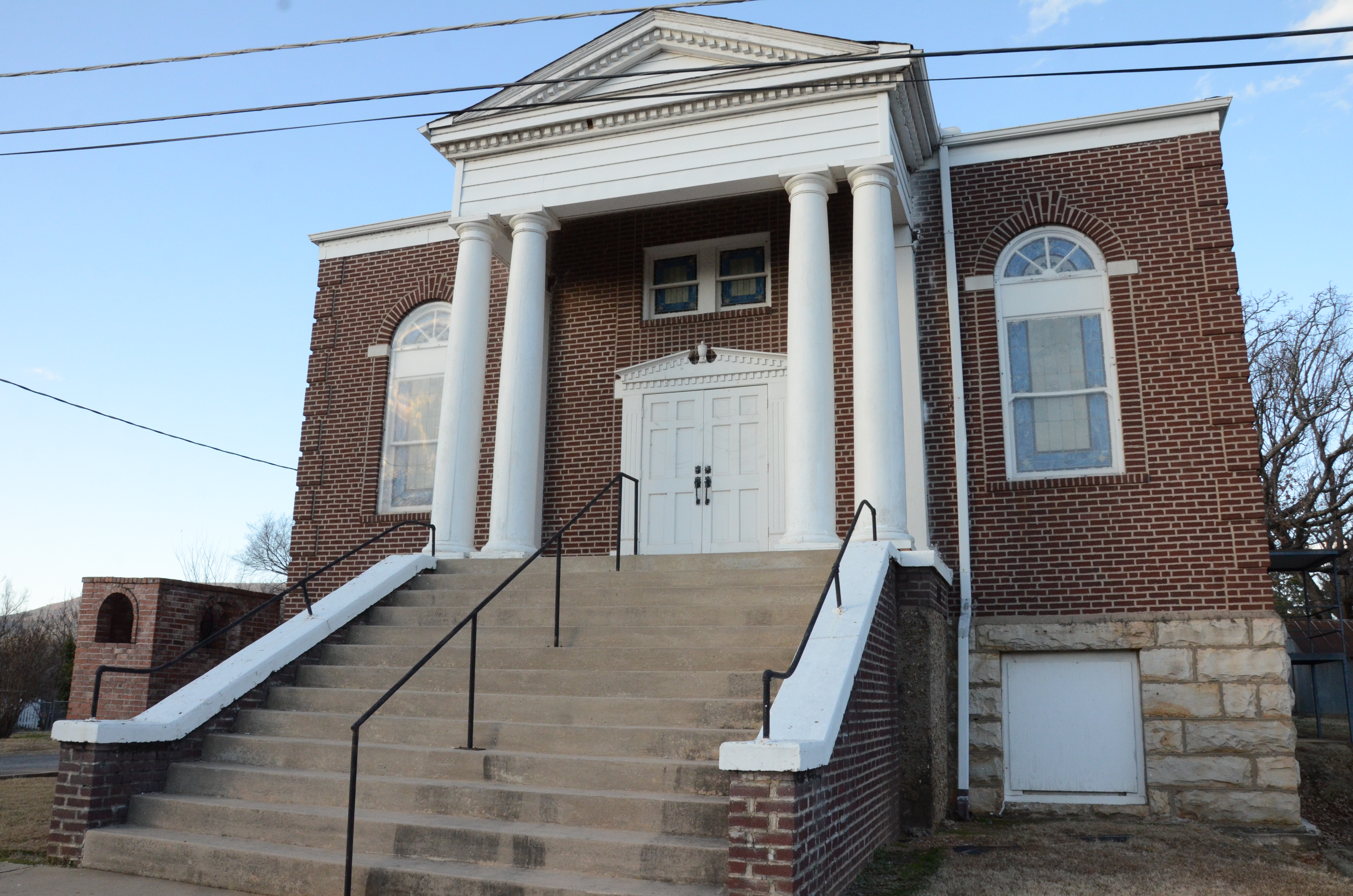

- Location within Arkansas Location within the United States
- Location: 400 E. Main St., Hartford, Arkansas
- Coordinates: 35°1′22″N 94°22′38″W
- Area: less than one acre
- Built: 1921
- Architectural style: Classical Revival
- NRHP reference No.: 10001157
- Added to NRHP: January 21, 2011

The Jones Memorial Methodist Church is a historic church building at 400 East Main Street in Hartford, Arkansas. It is a T-shaped two story brick building, with a gabled roof and stone foundation. Its main facade has a Classical Revival appearance, with a gabled portico sheltering the main entrance, supported by six large Doric columns. Built in 1921, it is the only major example of the architectural style in the small city. The $25,000 cost of its construction was a burden on the congregation, and its mortgage was paid off in the 1930s by Dr. Elisha Baxter Jones, in whose honor the church was thereafter named.

The building was listed on the National Register of Historic Places in 2011. In 2023, the congregation disaffiliated from the United Methodist Church.

== See also ==
- National Register of Historic Places listings in Sebastian County, Arkansas
