= Robert Wanslow House =

Historic house in Arkansas, United States

- U.S. National Register of Historic Places
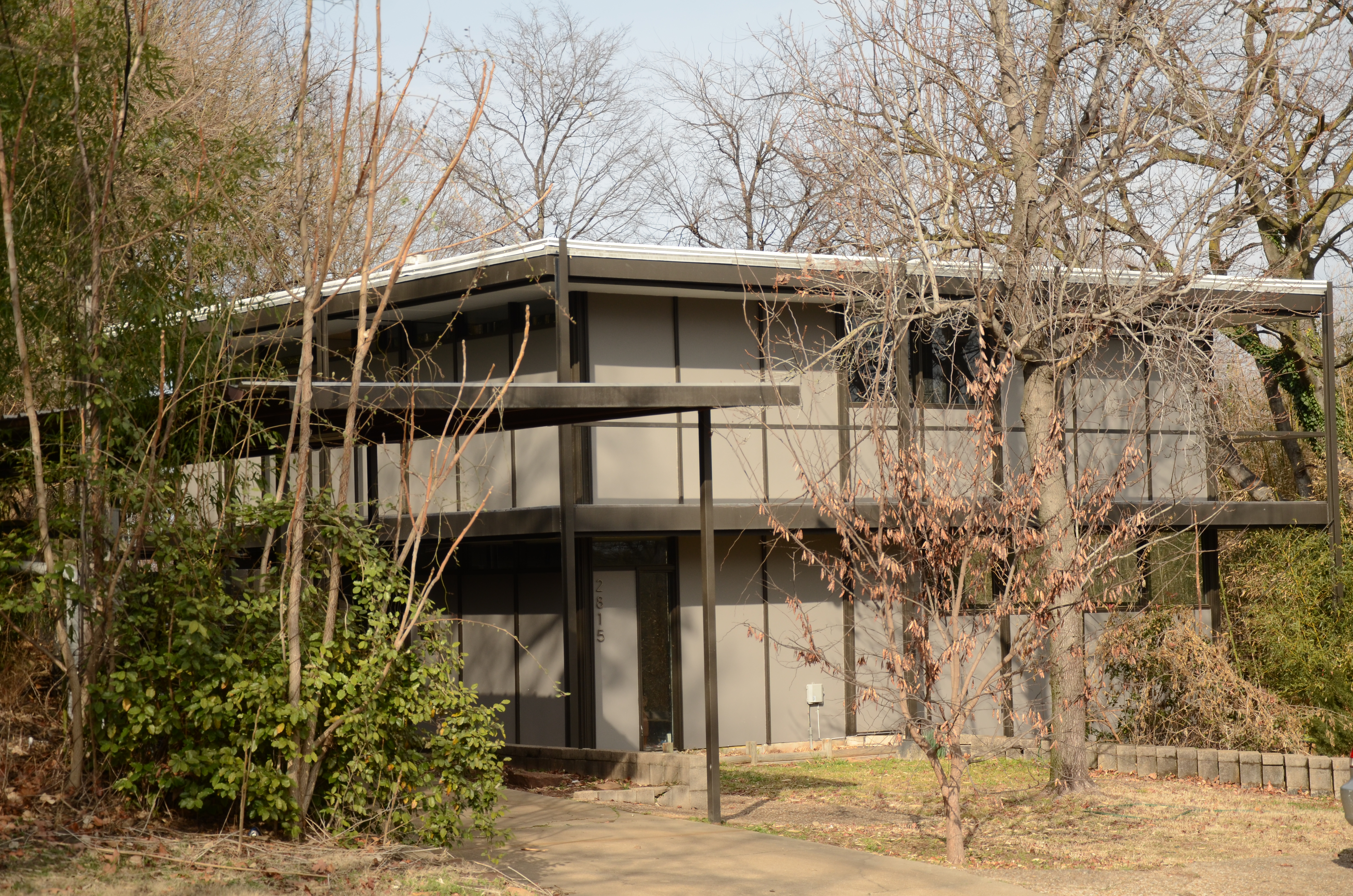

- Location within Arkansas Location within the United States
- Location: 2815 South Q St., Fort Smith, Arkansas
- Coordinates: 35°21′57″N 94°24′7″W
- Area: less than one acre
- Built: 1962
- Architect: Robert Wanslow
- Architectural style: Mid-Century Modern
- NRHP reference No.: 100002007
- Added to NRHP: January 26, 2018

The Robert Wanslow House is a historic house at 2815 South Q Street in Fort Smith, Arkansas. It is a two-story structure framed with steel, clad in concrete panels and set on a poured concrete foundation. It has a flat roof with deep overhanging eaves, and is surrounded by a two-story porch supported by steel beams. It was built in 1962 to a design by architect Robert Wanslow, for use as his family residence. The house is locally distinctive for its Mid-Century Modern styling, which contrasts with the more conventional neighboring ranch houses.

The house was listed on the National Register of Historic Places in 1979.

== See also ==
- National Register of Historic Places listings in Sebastian County, Arkansas
