= Horace Franklin Rogers House =

Historic house in Arkansas, United States

- U.S. National Register of Historic Places
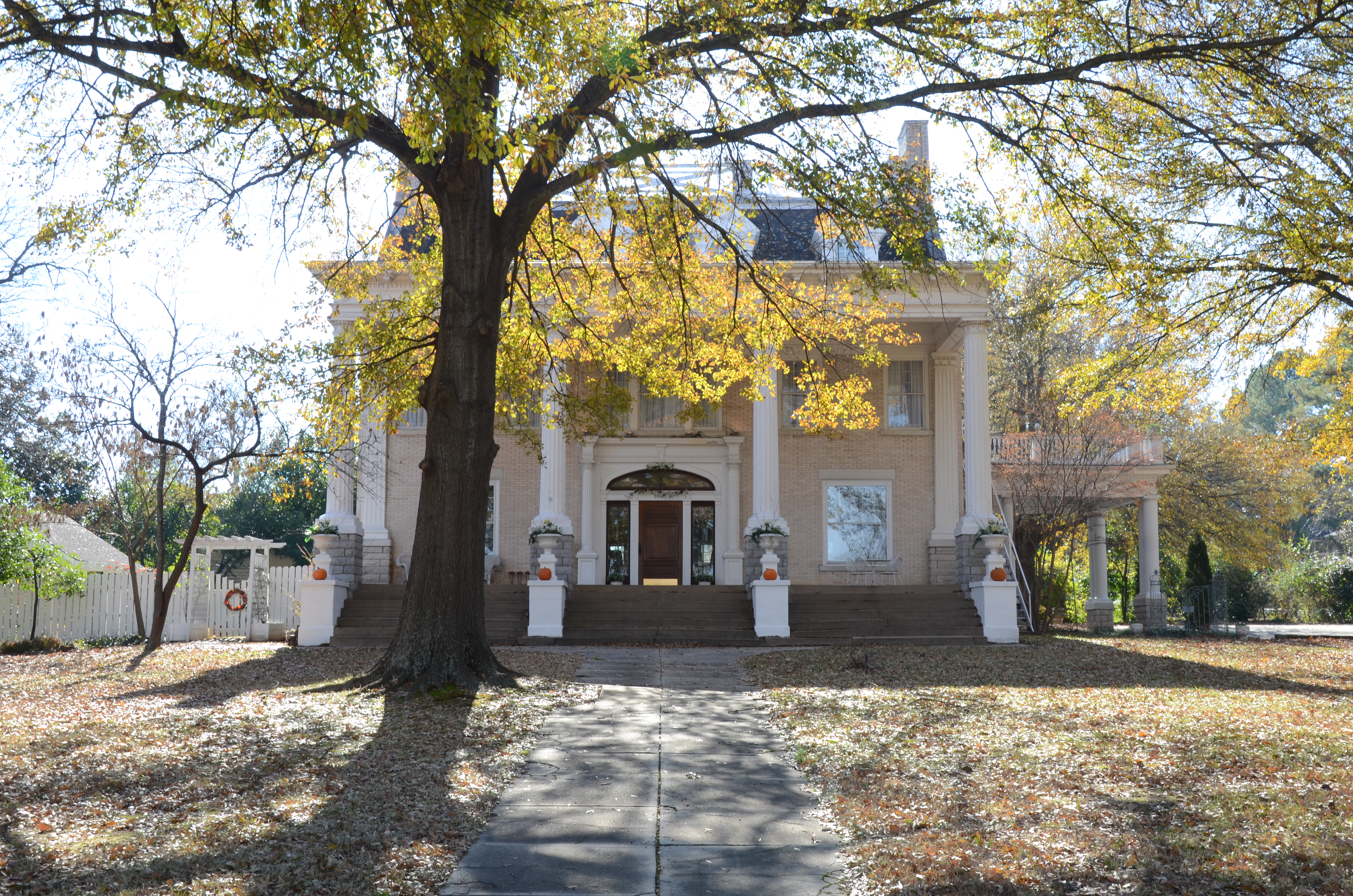

- Location within Arkansas Location within the United States
- Location: 2900 Rogers Ave., Fort Smith, Arkansas
- Coordinates: 35°22′32″N 94°24′0″W
- Area: 1 acre (0.40 ha)
- Built: 1904
- Architect: Klingingsmith
- Architectural style: Greek, Roman, Romanesque, Renaissace
- NRHP reference No.: 79000463
- Added to NRHP: May 2, 1979

The Horace Franklin Rogers House is a historic house at 2900 Rogers Avenue in Fort Smith, Arkansas. It is an architecturally eclectic three-story house, fashioned in 1904 out of distinctive white glazed bricks fashioned in the brickyard of its builder, Horace Franklin Rogers. The front has Classical elements including four posts with Doric and Corinthian elements set on high stone piers supporting the porch, and a front entry that is flanked by large sidelight windows and topped by a stained-glass semi-oval window, and flanked by tall pilasters. Window framing varies stylistically by floor. The interior is richly decorated, and has a large ballroom space on the third floor that was a major social scene in the early 20th century.

The house was listed on the National Register of Historic Places in 1979.

== See also ==
- National Register of Historic Places listings in Sebastian County, Arkansas
