= May–Lecta–Sweet Historic District =

Historic district in Arkansas, United States

- U.S. National Register of Historic Places
- U.S. Historic district
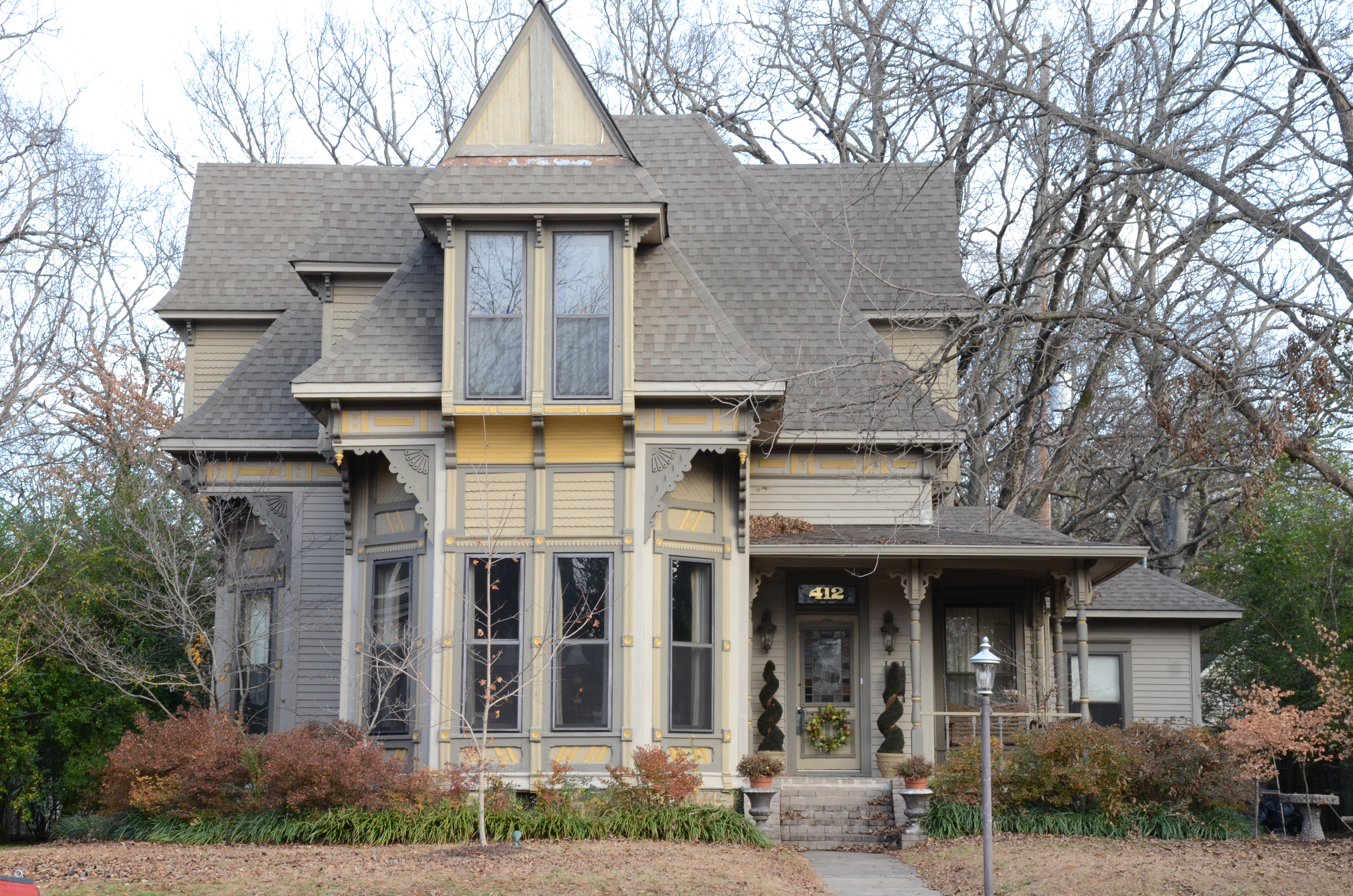

- Location within Arkansas Location within the United States
- Location: Roughly bounded by May Ave, Rogers Ave, Sweet Ave, and Kinkead Ave, Fort Smith, Arkansas
- Coordinates: 35.37871°N 94.40097°W
- Area: 55 acres (22 ha)
- Architectural style: Late 19th And 20th Century Revivals, Bungalow/craftsman
- NRHP reference No.: 08000597
- Added to NRHP: July 2, 2008

The May–Lecta–Sweet Historic District encompasses a predominantly residential area of Fort Smith, Arkansas that was developed between 1890 and 1950. It is located in a large residential area east of Fort Smith's downtown, and extends along May and Lecta Streets between Rogers and Kinkead Avenue (not including properties on either of the end streets except for the Central Presbyterian Church), and a short stretch of Sweet Avenue between Barry and Rogers. The streets are tree-lined, and the area was considered suburban when it was platted and development began in the 1890s. The houses of the district are mainly Colonial Revival and Craftsman in their style reflective of the principal period of development, between about 1900 and the early 1930s. The area was served by streetcars (running down May Avenue) until the 1930s.

The district was listed on the National Register of Historic Places in 2008.

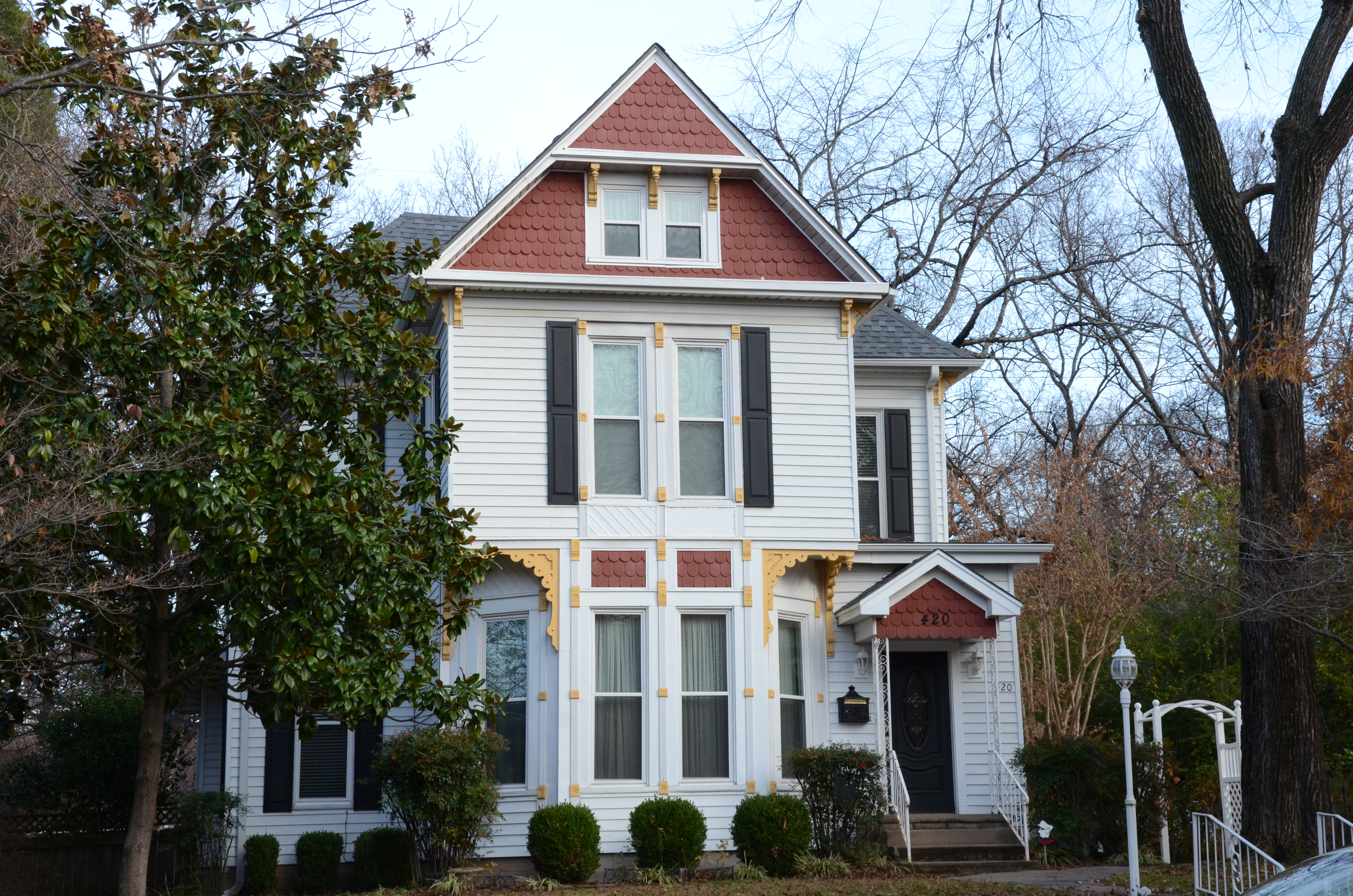
Colonial revival style house in May–Lecta–Sweet Historic District

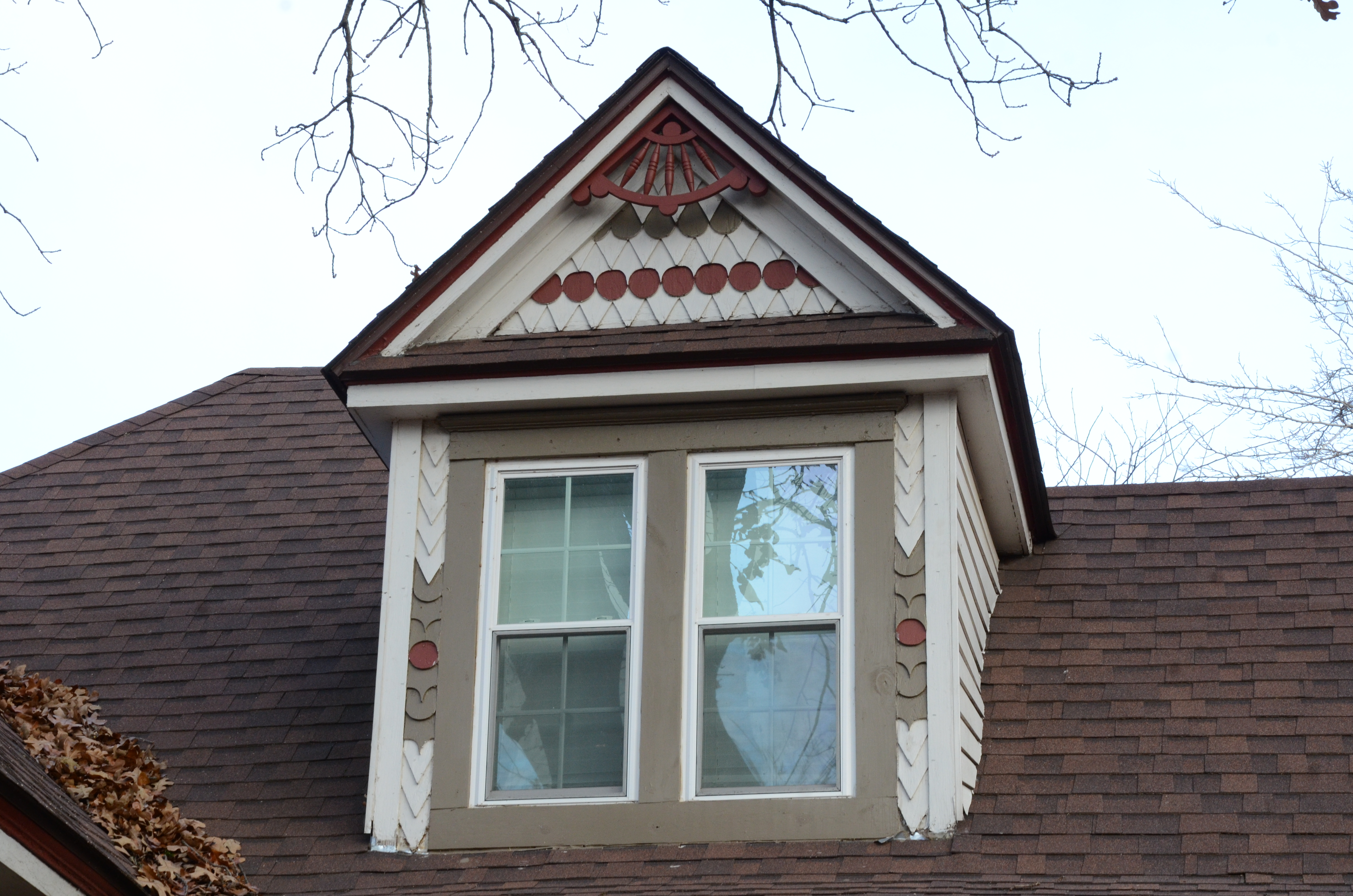
Detail of dormer window

== See also ==
- National Register of Historic Places listings in Sebastian County, Arkansas
