= Fishback Neighborhood Historic District =

Historic district in Arkansas, United States

- U.S. National Register of Historic Places
- U.S. Historic district
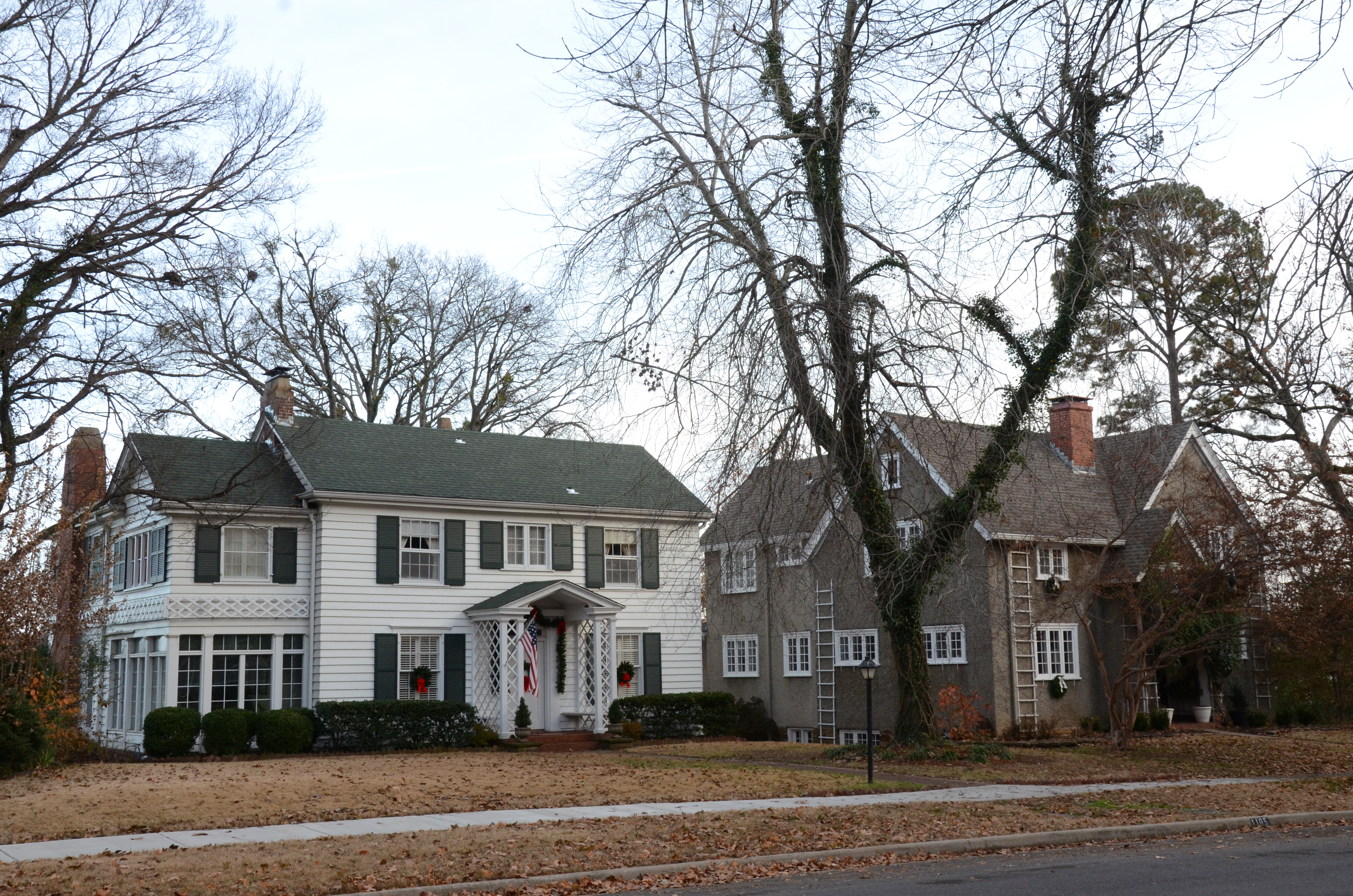

- Location within Arkansas Location within the United States
- Location: Roughly bounded by Rogers, Greenwood, and Dodson Aves. and 31st St.; also roughly bounded by Rogers & Dodson Aves., S. 24th, S. 26th & J Sts.
- Coordinates: 35°22′25″N 94°24′5″W
- Area: 45 acres (18 ha)
- Architect: Multiple
- Architectural style: Late 19th and Early 20th Century Revivals
- NRHP reference No.: 10000780 (original); 14001232 (increase)

Significant dates
- Added to NRHP: September 23, 2010
- Boundary increase: February 3, 2015

The Fishback Neighborhood Historic District is a residential historic district located southeast of the central business district of Fort Smith, Arkansas. The district, originally bounded by Rogers, South Greenwood, and South 31st Streets and Dodson Avenue, was developed out of the former estate of William Meade Fishback in the first three decades of the 20th century. Most of the houses built are Colonial or Classical Revival, or Tudor Revival, although the Craftsman style is also well represented. The district was listed with these bounds in 2010; in 2015 it was enlarged to the west by the addition of properties as far west as South 24th Street.

== See also ==
- National Register of Historic Places listings in Sebastian County, Arkansas
