= Arkansas Highway 22 =

American state highway

Highway 22

Route information
- Maintained by ArDOT
- Length: 75.60 mi (121.67 km)
- Existed: 1926–present

Major junctions
- West end: US 64 / US 71B in Fort Smith
- I-540 / US 71 in Fort Smith; Future I-49 / AR 549 in Barling; AR 23 in Caulksville
- East end: AR 7 / AR 27 in Dardanelle

Location
- Country: United States
- State: Arkansas
- Counties: Sebastian, Franklin, Logan, Yell

Highway system
- Arkansas Highway System; Interstate; US; State; Business; Spurs; Suffixed; Scenic; Heritage
← AR 21	→ AR 23

Arkansas Highway 22 (AR 22) is an east–west state highway in the Arkansas River Valley. The route runs 75.60 miles (121.67 km) from US 64 in Fort Smith east to Highway 7 in Dardanelle. Following the historic stagecoach line of the cross-country Butterfield Trail, the route is one of the original 1926 state highways. It is designated by the AHTD as the True Grit Trail.

== Route description ==
The route begins in Fort Smith at US 64/US 71B. It runs east, crossing I-540/US 71 and the incomplete interchange at the northern end of Highway 549 (future I-49). From its western terminus in Fort Smith, it carries the Seminole route of the Trail of Tears to Highway 255. Highway 255 then intersects Highway 96 east of the installation. The route next enters Charleston where it meets Highway 217 and the historic Butterfield Trail. The historic route continues along Highway 22 to its eastern terminus in Dardanelle. Continuing east into Branch, the route has a brief concurrency with Highway 41. County Line High School is located on the highway between Branch and Ratcliff.

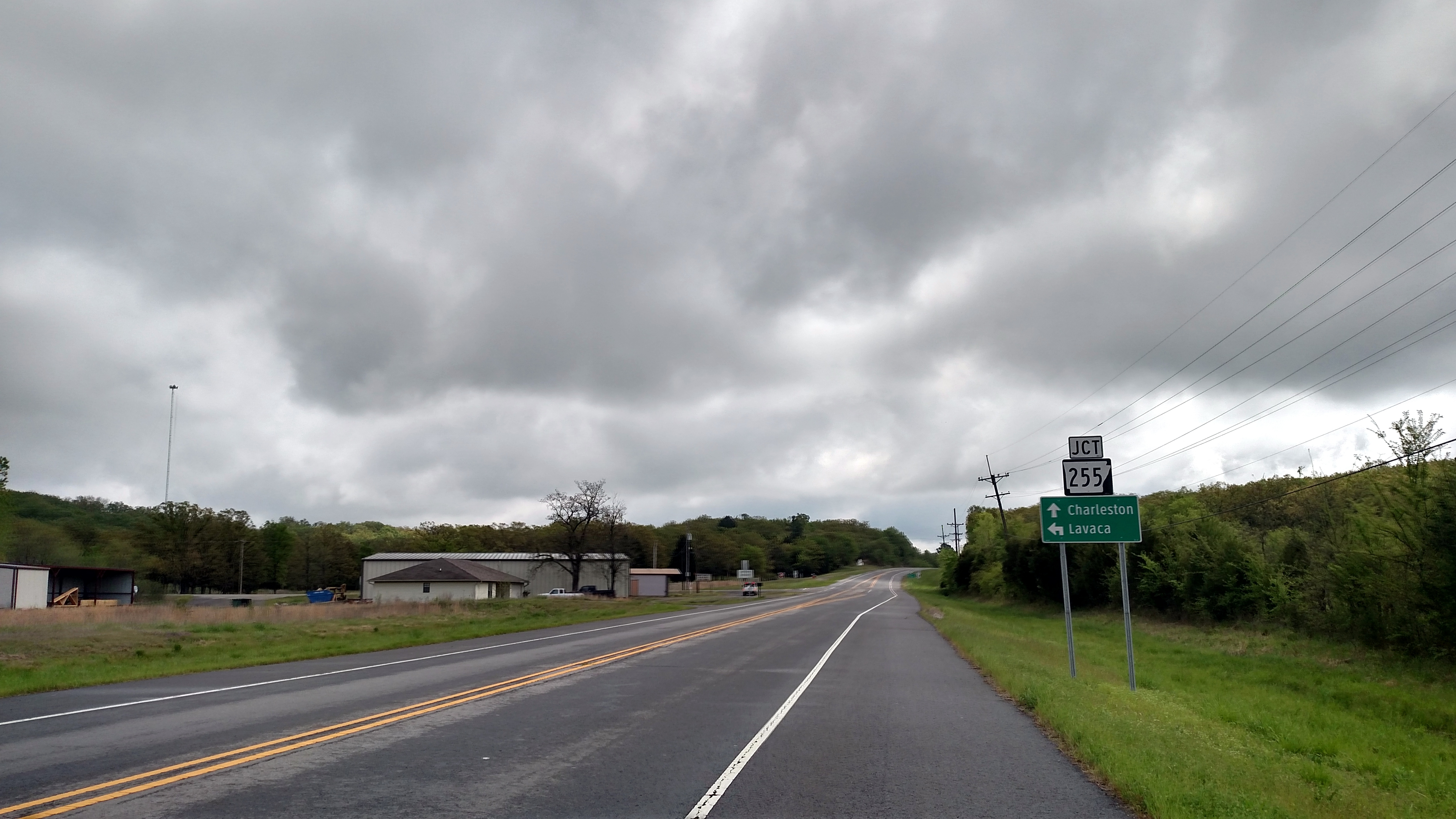
Highway 22 east of Barling

In the town of Caulksville, Highway 22 has a junction with Highway 23. Continuing east into the city of Paris, the highway has a junction with Highway 109/Highway 309. Highway 22 continues east to Subiaco, where it crosses Highway 197. In Midway, Highway 22 meets Highway 109, which heads north towards Clarksville. Highway 22 continues east to Dardanelle, passing through the communities of New Blaine and Delaware along the way. In Dardanelle, the route terminates at Highway 7 after an intersection with Highway 155.

The road itself is fairly straight and in reasonably good repair. Passing can be safely accomplished in several stretches of Highway 22 despite a lack of constructed passing areas.

== History ==
Former alignments of Highway 22

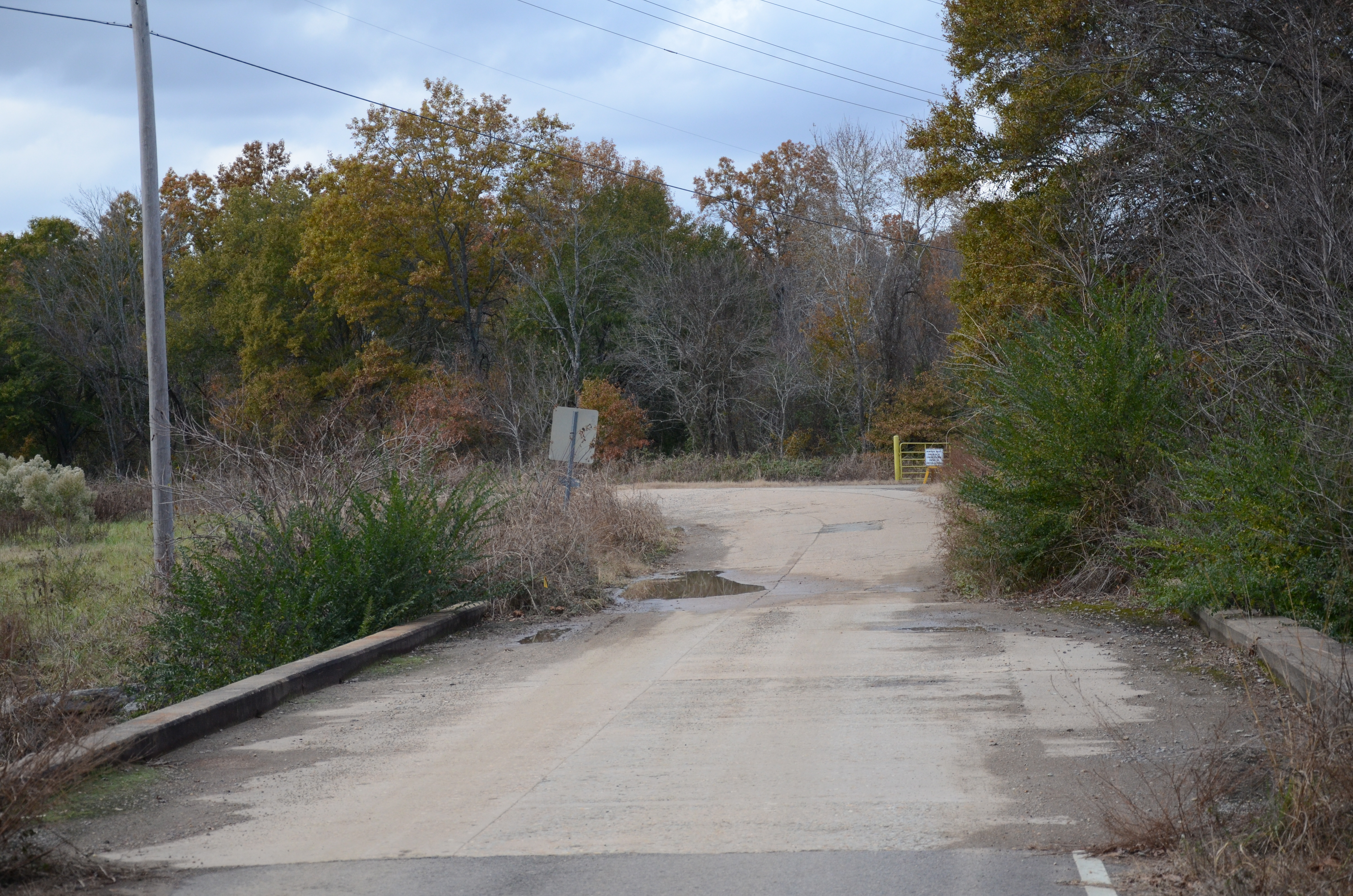
Barling segment

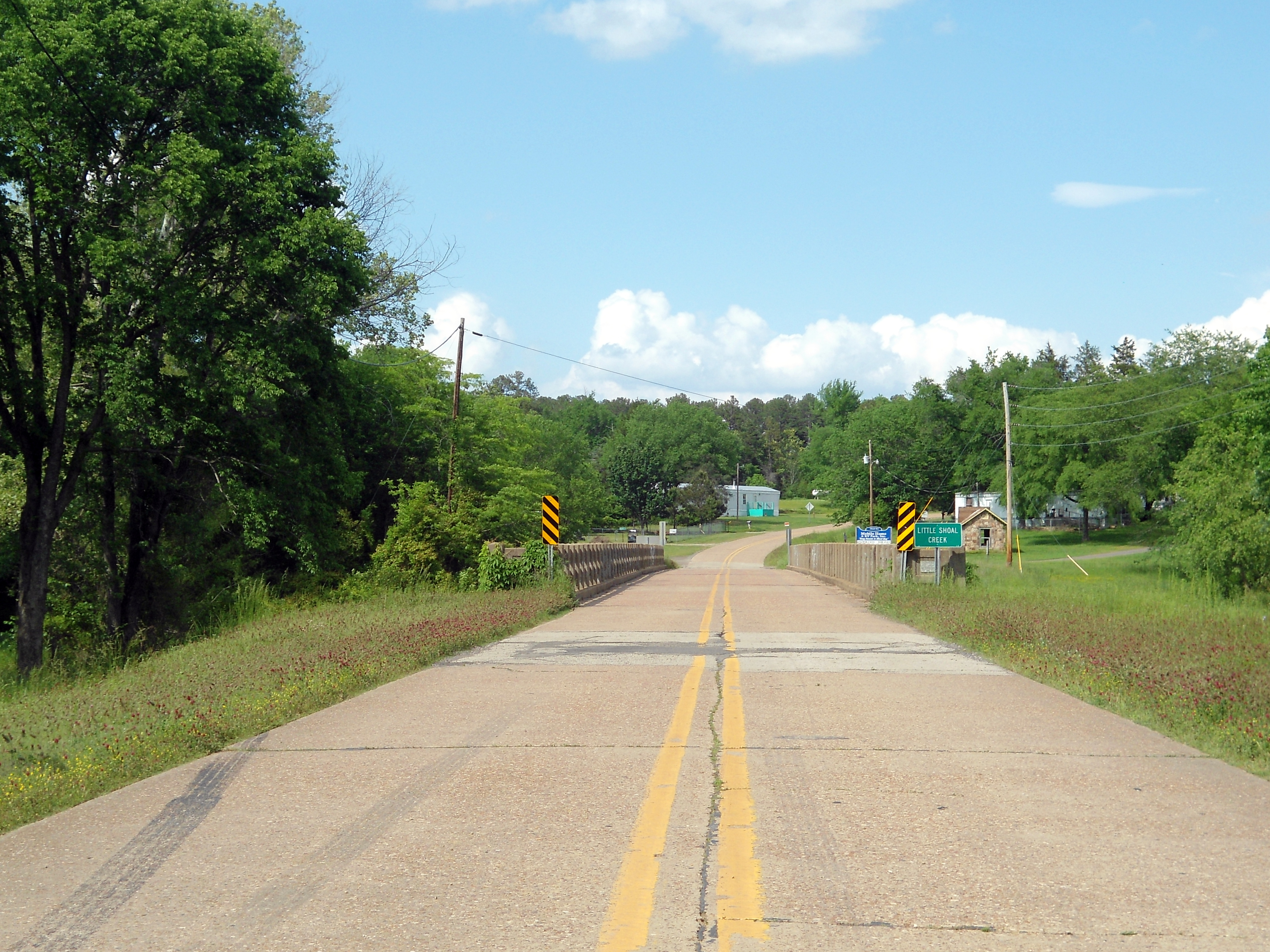
New Blaine segment

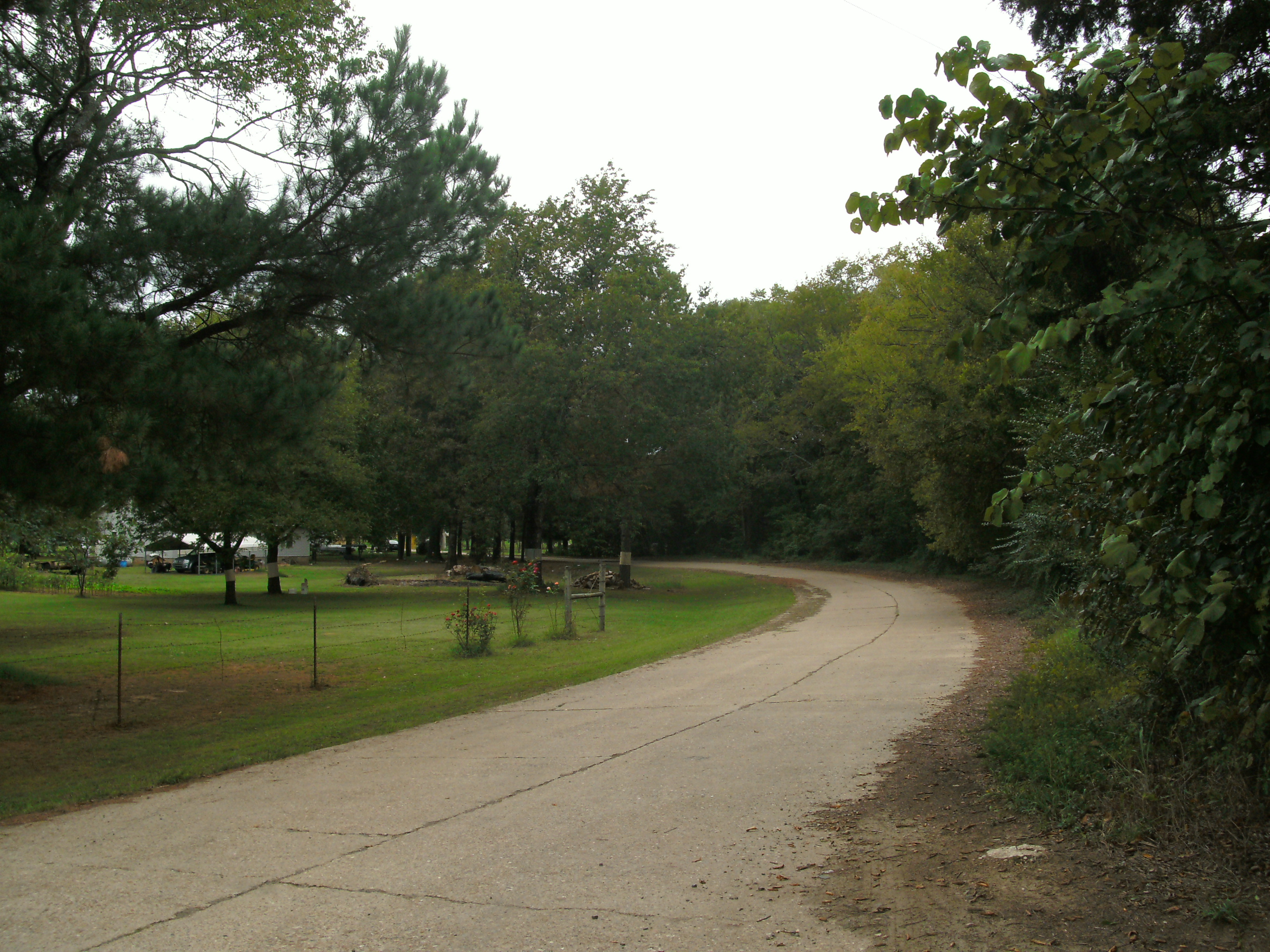
Dardanelle segment

The precursor to today's Highway 22 was the Butterfield Trail, a stagecoach trail officially known as the Overland Mail Company that traveled roughly along the present-day highway's route from Dardanelle to Fort Smith. The stagecoach carried mail and passengers from Memphis to Fort Smith. In Fort Smith the trail split into two routes, with one traveling west to San Francisco and the other traveling north to St. Louis. The Butterfield Trail was in operation from 1858 to 1861.

Upon its establishment, Highway 22 was one of the original 1926 Arkansas state highways. Highway 22 ran from Fort Smith to Dardanelle along a routing very similar to the modern-day routing of AR 22. On July 14, 2015 the highway was linked to Future I-49 in Barling. In June 2019 a proposal was made under the Connecting Arkansas Program-2 for US$25 million to be allocated to the improvement of sections of Highway 22 between Fort Smith and Charleston. On March 20 of the same year, the highway was officially designated by the AHTD as the True Grit Trail. The name comes from the 1968 novel, True Grit by Charles Portis. Frank Ross, father of the protagonist Mattie Ross, travels along Highway 22 from Dardanelle to Fort Smith.

=== National Register of Historic Places ===
Three original segments of Highway 22 remain intact and are listed on the National Register of Historic Places. The New Blaine segment was listed in 2003, the Barling segment was listed in May 2007, and the Yell County segment was listed in 2008. All three listings are contained within the Arkansas Highway History and Architecture Multiple Property Submission, which preserves history from Arkansas's highway building era between 1910 and 1965.

==== Barling ====
The Old Arkansas 22, Barling Segment is a historic section of roadway in Barling, Arkansas. Now named Mayo Drive, it consists of a 0.5-mile (0.80 km) stretch of concrete pavement, two lanes wide, in the northwestern part of the city. It extends north from the current alignment of Highway 22 until it reaches a sharp curve, where the pavement narrows significantly, before continuing westward to rejoin the highway. This stretch of pavement was constructed in 1928 by the Koss Construction Company, and is longest section of surviving pavement of the early alignment of Highway 22.

==== New Blaine ====
Old Arkansas Highway 22 is a historic roadway section in New Blaine, Arkansas. It consists of an S-shaped section asphalt, 1.5 miles (2.4 km) in length, built in 1930 by Cook & Ransom and the Schultz Construction Company to carry Highway 22. This section was bypassed by the present alignment in the 1960s. It is now designated as part of Highway 197, the Highway 197 Loop, and Rainbow Loop, and continues to provide the primary access to the town center.

==== Yell County ====
One surviving element of the original alignment survives in Yell County west of Dardanelle; it consists of County Road 906 (CR 906), a 0.25-mile (0.40 km) stretch of concrete pavement 18 feet (5.5 m) wide. This segment was listed on the National Register of Historic Places in 2008.

== Major intersections ==
County	Location	mi	km	Destinations	Notes
Sebastian	Fort Smith	0.00	0.00	US 64 / US 71B – National Historic Site, National Cemetery	Western terminus
Sebastian	Fort Smith	3.67	5.91	I-540 (US 71) to I-40 – Van Buren	Exits 8B-A on I-540
Sebastian	Barling	7.07	11.38	AR 253 south	Northern terminus of AR 253
Sebastian	Barling	8.07	12.99	AR 255 north	Southern terminus of AR 255
Sebastian	Barling	8.38	13.49	AR 59 north – Van Buren, Trimble Lock & Dam, Springhill Park	Southern terminus of AR 59
Sebastian	Barling	8.65	13.92	Future I-49 south / AR 549 south	Current northern terminus and exit 193 on AR 549
Sebastian	Central City	11.00	17.70	AR 255 south – Vache Grasse Park	Northern terminus of AR 255
Sebastian	Diamond Grove	14.04	22.60	AR 96 – Lavaca, Greenwood	
Sebastian		16.33	26.28	AR 255 north – Lavaca	Southern terminus of AR 255
Sebastian		20.20	32.51	AR 252 west	Eastern terminus of AR 252
Franklin	Charleston	23.58	37.95	AR 217 north (Greenwood Street) – Vesta	Southern terminus of AR 217
Franklin	Charleston	24.33	39.16	AR 217 south (South Rattlesnake Road)	Northern terminus of AR 217
Franklin	Branch	29.21	47.01	AR 41 west – Chismville	Western end of AR 41 concurrency
Franklin	Branch	29.81	47.97	AR 41 east – Cecil	Eastern end of AR 41 concurrency
Logan	Ratcliff	32.61	52.48	AR 398 west	Eastern terminus of AR 398
Logan	Caulksville	33.81	54.41	AR 23 – Ozark, Booneville	
Logan	Paris	39.69	63.87	AR 369 south (South Charcoal Plant Road)	Northern terminus of AR 369
Logan	Paris	41.40	66.63	AR 109 south / AR 309 (Elm Street) – Mount Magazine State Park	Northern terminus of AR 109
Logan	Subiaco	46.79	75.30	AR 197 north – Scranton	Southern terminus of AR 197
Logan	Midway	52.99	85.28	AR 109 north – Clarksville, Cane Creek Recreation Area, Dublin Recreation Area	Southern terminus of AR 109
Logan	New Blaine	59.69	96.06	AR 197 north – Shoal Bay Recreation Area	Southern terminus of AR 197
Logan	Delaware	66.00	106.22	AR 393 north – Delaware Recreation Area	Southern terminus of AR 393
Yell	Dardanelle	75.29	121.17	AR 155 west – Mount Nebo State Park	Eastern terminus of AR 155
Yell	Dardanelle	75.60	121.67	AR 7 / AR 27 south – Ola, Danville, Russellville	Eastern terminus; northern terminus of AR 27
1.000 mi = 1.609 km; 1.000 km = 0.621 mi: Concurrency terminus; Incomplete access

== See also ==
- National Register of Historic Places listings in Logan County, Arkansas
- National Register of Historic Places listings in Sebastian County, Arkansas
- National Register of Historic Places listings in Yell County, Arkansas
