= Arkansas Highway 255 =

State highway in Arkansas, United States

Highway 255

Route information
- Maintained by ArDOT

Section 1
- Length: 7.37 mi (11.86 km)
- North end: Future I-49 / AR 549 / AR 22
- South end: AR 22 in Central City

Section 2
- Length: 17.21 mi (27.70 km)
- North end: AR 22 in Barling
- South end: US 64 / US 71B in Fort Smith

Location
- Country: United States
- State: Arkansas
- Counties: Sebastian

Highway system
- Arkansas Highway System; Interstate; US; State; Business; Spurs; Suffixed; Scenic; Heritage
← AR 254	→ AR 256

Highway 255 (AR 255, Ark. 255, and Hwy. 255) is a designation for two north–south state highways in Sebastian County. An eastern route of 7.37 miles (11.86 km) runs north from Highway 22 through Lavaca to terminate at Highway 22 in Central City. A second route of 17.21 miles (27.70 km) begins at Highway 22 in Barling and runs to US Route 64/U.S. Route 71B (US 64/US 71B). (Note: Distance given for northbound. The highways splits into a one-way pair in downtown Fort Smith with northbound running along B Street and southbound Highway 255 following A Street. The total southbound distance is 16.83 miles (27.09 km).)

== Route description ==
=== Lavaca to Central City ===
Highway 255 begins at Highway 22 near Fort Chaffee and runs north to Lavaca. The route has a brief concurrency with Highway 96 along Main Street before turning southwest. The highway enters Central City and terminates at Highway 22 near the Barling city limits.

=== Barling to Fort Smith ===
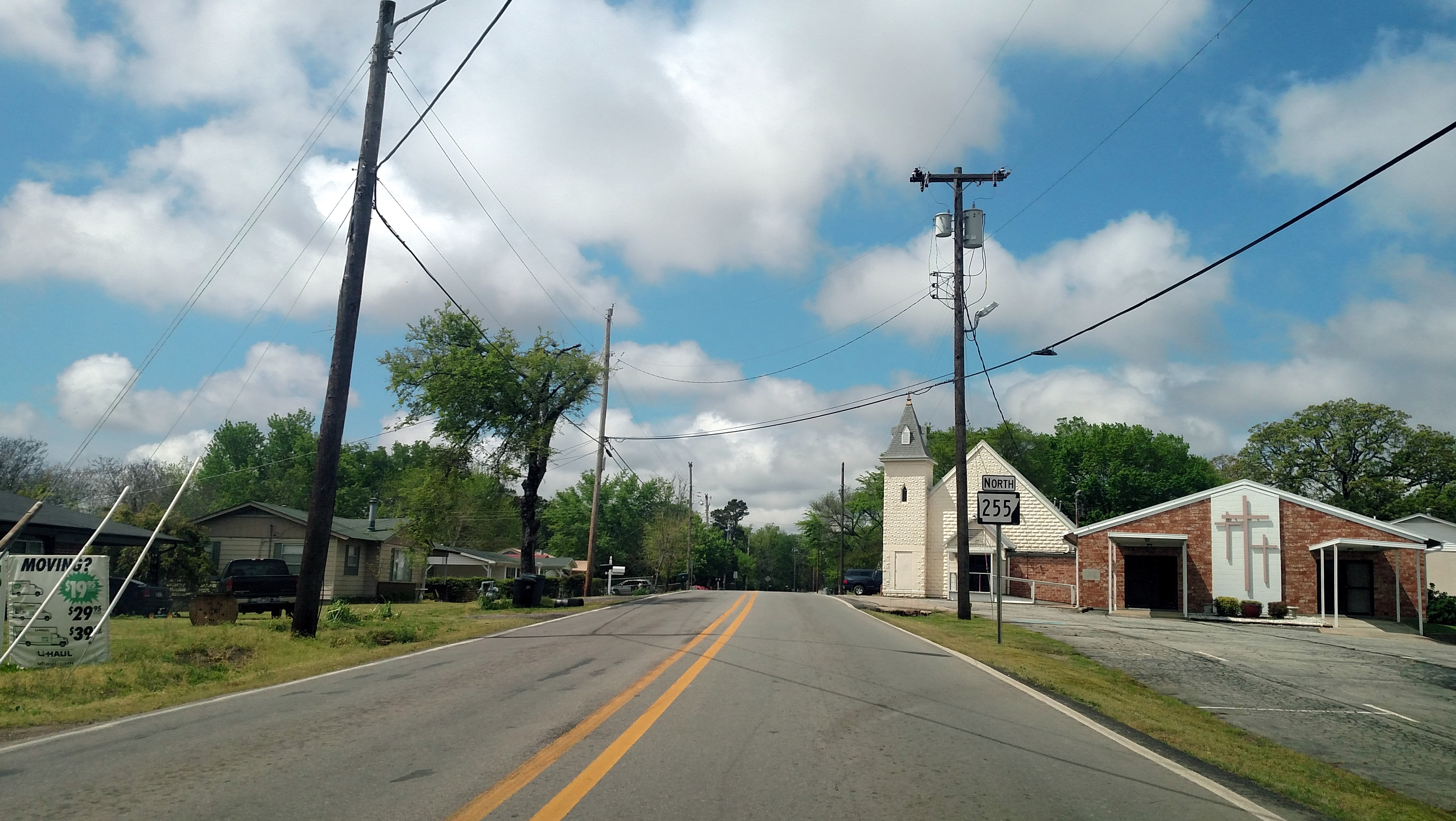
Highway 255 near the eastern terminus in Barling

Highway 255 begins at Highway 22 in Barling and runs west along the northern edge of Fort Chaffee. The route has a junction with Highway 253 shortly before entering Fort Smith. Continuing west along the southern edge of Fort Smith Regional Airport, Highway 255 has a junction with Highway 45 and an interchange with Interstate 540. The highway continues west to form a concurrency with US 71B. During the overlap US 71B/AR 255 serve as the northern terminus for US 271. Approaching the Oklahoma state line, US 71B turns north, ending the concurrency. Highway 255 continues west shortly before turning due north and paralleling the state line. The route passes Fort Smith National Cemetery, Judge Isaac C. Parker Federal Building, and Sebastian County Courthouse-Fort Smith City Hall on its way to enter downtown Fort Smith. All three properties are listed on the National Register of Historic Places (NRHP). Highway 255 crosses US 64 (Garrison Avenue) near the West Garrison Avenue Historic District before splitting into a one-way pair of streets for five blocks. Northbound traffic continues along B Street and southbound traffic runs on A Street until reuniting on Riverfront Drive. Highway 255 winds along the Arkansas River and terminates at US 64/US 71B near the bridge over the river. There are plans and current construction as of July 3, 2021 to realign Highway 255 near Chaffee Crossing to Frontier Road and the Highway 22 and Highway 59 intersection.

== Major intersections ==
Mile markers reset at concurrencies. The entire route is in Sebastian County.

Location	mi	km	Destinations	Notes
	0.00	0.00	AR 22 – Charleston, Barling	Southern terminus
Lavaca	2.78	4.47	AR 96 east (Main Street) – Ozark	
Lavaca	AR 96 concurrency west, 0.36 miles (0.58 km)			
Lavaca	0.00	0.00	AR 96 west – Greenwood	
Central City	7.37	11.86	AR 22 (Central Avenue)	Northern terminus
AR 255 begins in Barling
Barling			Future I-49 / AR 549 – Bella Vista, Fort Smith	Opened to traffic and signed as AR 549
Barling	0.00	0.00	AR 22 (Fort Street)	Southern terminus
Barling	0.76	1.22	AR 253 north (Strozier Lane)	AR 253 southern terminus
Fort Smith	4.86	7.82	AR 45 (Old Greenwood Road) to I-540 north / US 71 south	
Fort Smith	5.28	8.50	I-540 to I-40	
Fort Smith	6.18	9.95	US 71B south – Texarkana	
Fort Smith	US 71B concurrency west, 0.77 miles (1.24 km)			
Fort Smith	0.00	0.00	US 271 south / US 71B north (Towson Avenue) – Poteau, OK, Downtown Fort Smith	
Fort Smith	4.48	7.21	US 64 (Garrison Avenue)	
Fort Smith	17.21	27.70	US 64 / US 71B (Midland Boulevard)	Northern terminus
1.000 mi = 1.609 km; 1.000 km = 0.621 mi: Concurrency terminus

== See also ==
- List of state highways in Arkansas
