= Special routes of U.S. Route 71 =

Special routes of U.S. Route 71

Highway system
- United States Numbered Highway System; List; Special; Divided

A total of ten special routes of U.S. Route 71 exist, and another ten previously existed.

== Alexandria bypass ==
U.S. Highway 71 Bypass
- Location: Alexandria, Louisiana

Bypass US 71 is a controlled access highway at Alexandria, Louisiana. Its southern terminus is at an interchange with I-49 and US 71/US 167 in southern Alexandria. Its northern terminus is an interchange with I-49 and US 71 and US 165 in northern Alexandria near the city's downtown area. Bypass 71 runs a total distance of approximately five miles (8.0 km) and runs concurrently with I-49 for its whole length and is unsigned. Additionally, the bypass runs concurrent with US 167 from its southern terminus to the Pineville Expressway and with LA 28 from the Pineville Expressway to the bypass's northern terminus.

Exit numbers based on I-49's mileage. The entire route is in Alexandria, Rapides Parish.

mi	km	Exit	Destinations	Notes
0.0	0.0	80	I-49 south – Opelousas US 71 / US 167 south (MacArthur Drive)	Southern terminus; south end of US 167 overlap; no southbound exit to US 71 north (signed at exit 81) or northbound entrance from southbound US 71; US 71 exit 63
0.5	0.80	81	LA 3250 (Sugarhouse Road) to US 71 north (MacArthur Drive)	Southbound exit and northbound entrance
2.4	3.9	83	Broadway Avenue	
3.5	5.6	84	US 167 north (Pineville Expressway) / LA 28 east / LA 1 (Casson Street)	North end of US 167 overlap; south end of LA 28 overlap
3.7	6.0	85A	M. L. King Boulevard / Elliott Street to LA 1 – Downtown Alexandria	Signed northbound as M. L. King Drive, southbound as Elliott Street to LA 1
4.3	6.9	85B	Monroe Street / Medical Center Drive	Northbound exit and southbound entrance
5.1	8.2	86	I-49 north – Shreveport US 71 / US 165 / LA 28 west (MacArthur Drive)	Northern terminus; north end of LA 28 overlap; US 71 exits 71A-B
1.000 mi = 1.609 km; 1.000 km = 0.621 mi: Concurrency terminus; Incomplete access

== Waldron business route ==
U.S. Highway 71B
- Location: Waldron, Arkansas
- Length: 6.32 mi (10.17 km)

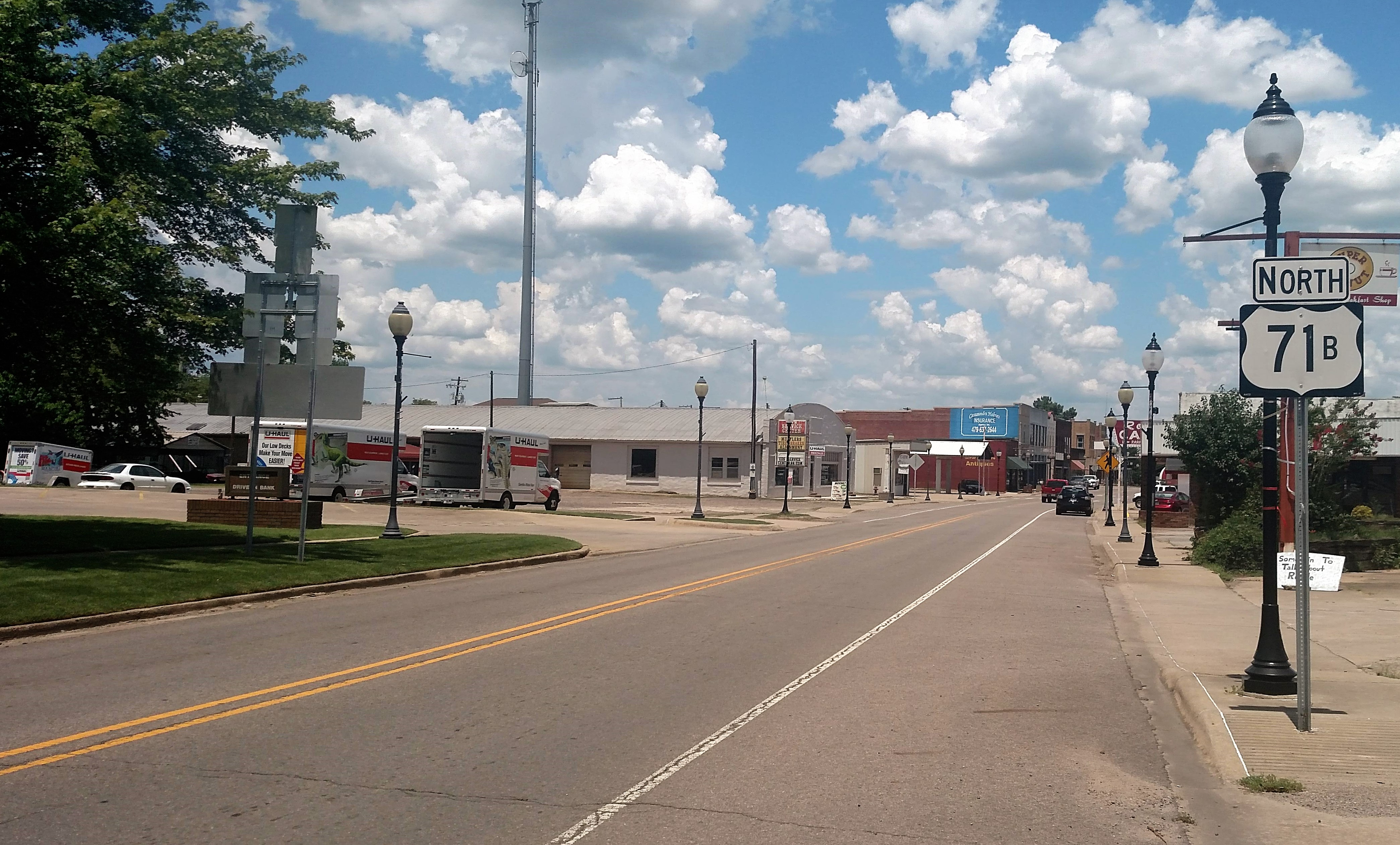
US 71B in Waldron

Business US 71 in Waldron runs approximately seven miles (11 km) beginning at US 71 2 1/2 miles (4.0 km) north of Waldron and ending at US 71 4 1/2 miles (7.2 km) south of Waldron. Signed locally as Main Street, it was created in 1971 after US 71 was rerouted around the west side of town.

== Fort Smith business loop ==
U.S. Highway 71B
- Location: Fort Smith, Arkansas
- Length: 19.3 mi (31.1 km)

US 71 Business runs approximately 13 miles (21 km) between Alma and Fort Smith, Arkansas. Its northern terminus is at I-40 and US 71 at Alma and its southern terminus is at I-540 and US 71 in south Fort Smith. US 71 Bus. passes through the towns of Alma, Van Buren and Fort Smith. One half mile south of I-40 at Alma, US 71 Bus. intersects US 64 and overlaps it to downtown Fort Smith and the junction of Arkansas Highway 22.

Within the city of Fort Smith, US 71 Bus. is commonly referred to by the names of Midland Boulevard (north of downtown), North 10th (one-way north-to-south) and North 11th Streets (one-way south-to-north) within downtown, Towson Avenue (south of downtown) and Zero Street (beginning at the intersection of US 271 and AR 255).

County	Location	mi	km	Destinations	Notes
Sebastian	Fort Smith	0.0	0.0	I-540 / US 71 – Texarkana, Spiro	Southern terminus; I-540 exit 12
Sebastian	Fort Smith	1.2	1.9	AR 255 south (Zero Street)	South end of AR 255 overlap
Sebastian	Fort Smith	1.9	3.1	US 271 south / AR 255 north	North end of AR 255 overlap
Sebastian	Fort Smith	5.6	9.0	AR 22 east (Rogers Avenue)	
Sebastian	Fort Smith	5.7	9.2	US 64 west (Garrison Avenue)	South end of US 64 overlap
Sebastian	Fort Smith	9.8	15.8	AR 255 south (Riverfront Drive)	
Arkansas River		10.3– 10.8	16.6– 17.4	Bridge	
Crawford	Van Buren	10.9	17.5	AR 59 south	South end of AR 59 overlap
Crawford	Van Buren	11.3	18.2	AR 59 north (Main Street) / South 11th Street	North end of AR 59 overlap
Crawford	Van Buren	11.9	19.2	AR 162 east (Kibler Road) – Kibler	
Crawford	Van Buren	12.8– 13.1	20.6– 21.1	I-540 to I-40 – Oklahoma City, Little Rock, Fort Smith	I-540 exits 2A-B
Crawford	Van Buren	13.7	22.0	AR 282 north	
Crawford		15.1	24.3	AR 60 west	
Crawford	Alma	18.9	30.4	US 64 east / AR 162 west – Dyer US 64B east (Fayetteville Avenue) – Downtown Alma	North end of US 64 overlap; south end of AR 162 overlap
Crawford	Alma	19.3	31.1	I-40 / US 71 / AR 162 ends – Fort Smith, Little Rock, Fayetteville	Northern terminus; north end of AR 162 overlap; I-40 exit 13
1.000 mi = 1.609 km; 1.000 km = 0.621 mi: Concurrency terminus

== Northwest Arkansas business route ==
U.S. Highway 71B
- Location: Northwest Arkansas
- Length: 19.895 mi (32.018 km)
- Existed: May 27, 1970–present

U.S. Route 71 Business (US 71B) in Northwest Arkansas is a business route of US 71 that spans 19.895 miles (32.018 km).

US 71B splits from the main route at the southern end of the Fulbright Expressway in Fayetteville, the southernmost principal city of the Northwest Arkansas region. It then runs north as School Ave, turning into Nelson Hackett Blvd (formerly Archibald Yell Hwy) at the intersection with AR 180/M.L.K Jr. Blvd. It snakes around downtown before meeting College Ave and running north through Fayetteville. A small segment of the Fulbright Expressway is also designated US 71B and serves as a connection between College Ave and Interstate 49/US Route 71. It passes the Washington Regional Medical Center on its way through uptown Fayetteville as a freeway, with exits signed for Gregg Avenue and College Avenue. The expressway ends and merges into College Avenue. Continuing north, US 71B is a divided highway and passes the Northwest Arkansas Mall and Lake Fayetteville prior to entering Springdale.

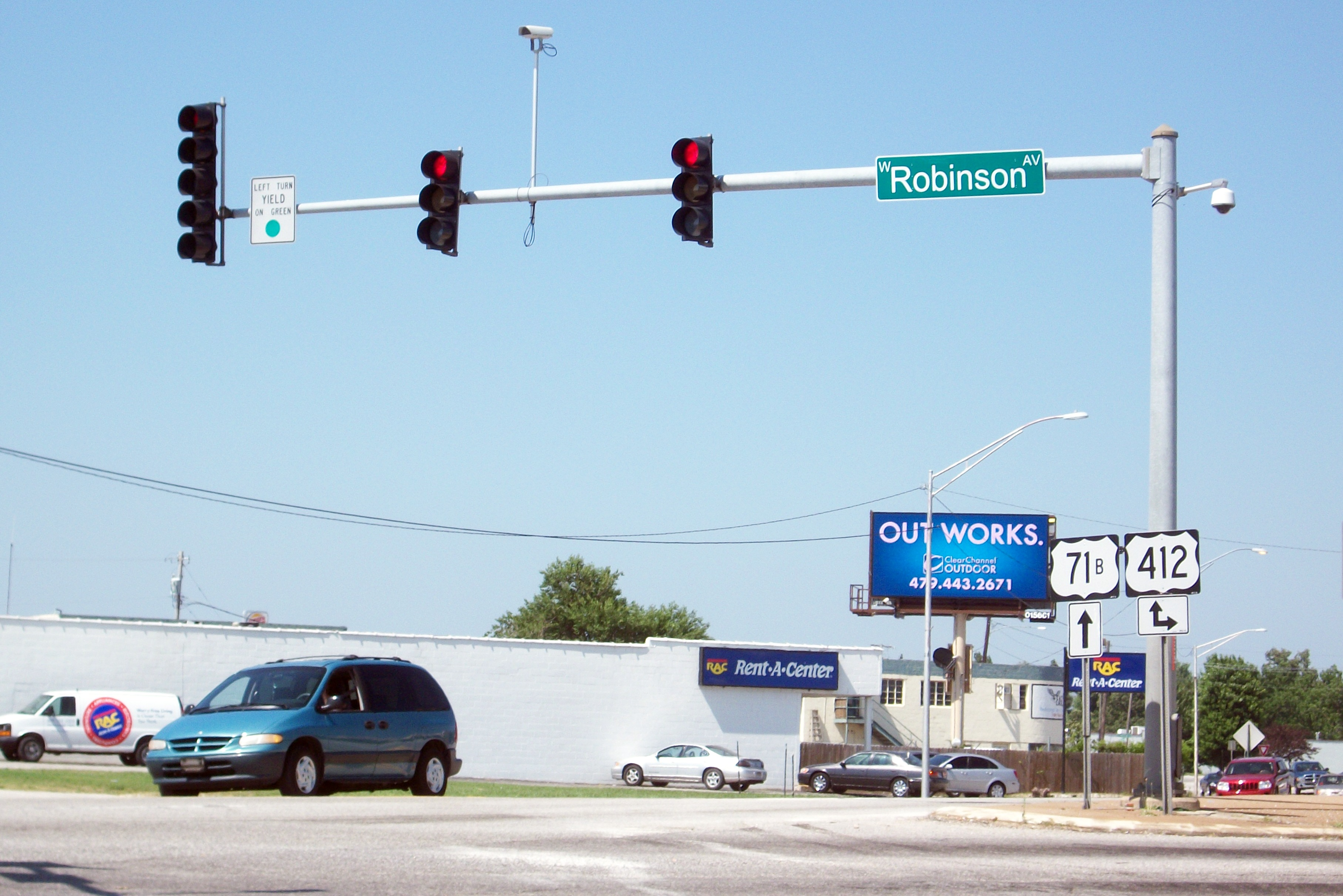
US 71B joins US 412 northbound at Robinson Avenue in Springdale.

Now known as Thompson Street, US 71B is a principal arterial in Springdale; passing the Springdale Country Club, intersecting Don Tyson Parkway, and crossing under the Arkansas and Missouri Railroad tracks before a junction with US 412 (Robinson Avenue). A concurrency begins northward, with US 71B/US 412 keeping the Thompson Avenue designation. After a short distance, US 412 turns west onto Sunset Avenue, with US 71B continuing north as Thompson Street into a commercial area of Springdale. The road passes Murphy Park, Springdale High School, and junctions with Emma Avenue just west of the Springdale Poultry Industry Historic District. North of the junction with Emma Avenue, US 71B passes the Springdale Public Schools Administrative Offices and passes over the Northwest Arkansas Razorback Regional Greenway and Spring Creek before entering Benton County.

US 71B passes the Beasley Homestead (listed on the National Register of Historic Places) shortly before serving as the western terminus of a segment of Highway 264.

US 71B becomes Bloomington Street in Lowell as it continues north to AR 94 (New Hope Road). Entering Rogers, US 71B meets US 62/AR 12 and becomes Walnut Street and turns east. The route passes St. Mary's Hospital and Dixieland Mall and crosses to I-49 as it enters Bentonville.

History
US 71B was created by the Arkansas State Highway Commission on May 27, 1970. The designation followed the historic alignment of US 71 through Fayetteville, with the mainline US 71 designation moved to the bypass, which would become I-540 in 2000 and I-49 in 2014.

The highway was truncated in Bentonville from the former northern terminus (I-49, US 71 and AR 549) to an intersection of SW Regional Airport Boulevard and Walton Boulevard (colloquially known as Rainbow Curve) in 2018. In late 2019, most of the alignment in Fayetteville was transferred to city maintenance. The agreement allowed Fayetteville to construct a redesign without seeking ARDOT approval for the changes.

Major intersections

County	Location	mi	km	Destinations	Notes
Washington	Fayetteville	0.000	0.000	AR 112 (Garland Avenue) – Fayetteville, University of Arkansas, Tontitown, Cave Springs	Southern terminus; at-grade intersection
Washington	Fayetteville	0.5	0.80	I-49 / US 71 (US 62 / North Fulbright Expressway) – Fort Smith, Joplin, MO	No northbound access to I-49 south; exit 67B on I-49; former I-540
Washington	Fayetteville	1.3	2.1	Gregg Street	Southbound exit and entrance; access via Shiloh Drive; to Washington Regional Medical Center
Washington	Fayetteville	1.3	2.1	Gregg Street	Northbound exit and entrance; access via Futrall Drive; to Washington Regional Medical Center
Washington	Fayetteville	1.65	2.66	College Avenue	
Washington	Fayetteville	1.65	2.66	Northern end of freeway section	
Washington	Springdale			US 412 east (Thompson Street) – Huntsville	Southern end of US 412 concurrency
Washington	Springdale	10.80	17.38	US 412 west (Sunset Avenue) – Siloam Springs	Northern end of US 412 concurrency
Benton	Springdale	14.30	23.01	AR 264 east	Western terminus of AR 264
Benton	Springdale			I-42 (Springdale Northern Bypass)	Proposed
Benton	Lowell	16.29	26.22	AR 264 west (Monroe Avenue) to I-49 (US 62 / US 71) – Cave Springs	Eastern terminus of AR 264
Benton	Rogers			AR 94 east (New Hope Road) – Monte Ne	Southern end of AR 94 concurrency
Benton	Rogers			AR 94 west (8th Street) to US 62 / AR 12	Northern end of AR 94 concurrency
Benton	Rogers–Bentonville line	19.895	32.018	I-49 (US 62 / US 71) – Springdale, Fayetteville	Exit 85 on I-49; former I-540
Benton	Rogers–Bentonville line	19.895	32.018	SE Walton Boulevard	Continuation west
1.000 mi = 1.609 km; 1.000 km = 0.621 mi: Concurrency terminus; Incomplete access; Unopened

== Pineville–Anderson business loop ==
U.S. Route 71 Business
- Location: Pineville–Anderson, Missouri
- Length: 12.7 mi (20.4 km)
- Existed: 2005–present

Business Loop 71 is an alternate alignment of U.S. Route 71 in southwest Missouri. Its northern terminus is at a partial interchange with I-49/US 71 approximately 7 miles (11 km) north of Anderson. Its southern terminus is an at-grade intersection with US 71 and Wolf Den Road (also known as McDonald County Road 71-22B SW) approximately 2 miles (3.2 km) south of Pineville. In Anderson, Business 71 runs concurrently with Route 59 for approximately 6 miles (9.7 km) and Route 76 for 2 miles (3.2 km). Business 71 was originally created in 2005 running from 7 miles (11 km) north of Anderson to 2 miles (3.2 km) south of town at an at-grade intersection with US 71. In 2007, it was extended along the former US 71 in Pineville after a new freeway section was built bypassing the town.

The entire route is in McDonald County.

Location	mi	km	Destinations	Notes
	0.0	0.0	US 71 north	Southern terminus; no access to and from southbound US 71
Pineville	1.5	2.4	Route K	
Pineville	2.0	3.2	Route H to I-49 / US 71 – Noel	
Pineville	2.3	3.7	Route W (Jesse James Road) / Elk River Road – Pineville	
	3.7	6.0	Route EE to I-49 / US 71	
Anderson	7.0	11.3	Route 76 east to I-49 / US 71 – Cassville	South end of Route 76 overlap
Anderson	8.0	12.9	Route 59 south / Route 76 west – Anderson	North end of Route 76 overlap; south end of Route 59 overlap
	9.2	14.8	Route NN	
	12.7	20.4	I-49 north / US 71 north / Route 59 north – Joplin, Goodman	Northern terminus; north end of Route 59 overlap; no access to southbound I-49 / US 71; I-49 exit 16
1.000 mi = 1.609 km; 1.000 km = 0.621 mi: Concurrency terminus; Incomplete access

== Neosho business loop ==
U.S. Route 71 Business
- Location: McDonald and Newton counties in Missouri
- Existed: December 12, 2012

== Joplin business loop ==
U.S. Route 71 Business
- Location: Newton County, Missouri
- Existed: December 12, 2012

== Nevada business loop ==
U.S. Route 71 Business
- Location: Nevada, Missouri
- Existed: December 12, 2012

== Butler business loop ==
U.S. Route 71 Business
- Location: Bates County, Missouri
- Existed: December 12, 2012

== Savannah business loop ==
U.S. Route 71 Business
- Location: Savannah, Missouri
- Length: 8.8 mi (14.2 km)

Business 71 begins at Interstate 29 Exit 53 and continues north through Savannah and rejoins US 71 about five miles after US 71 separated from Interstate 29. The first two miles of this highway when traveling north are designated as the Randy Bever Memorial Highway. This highway connects St. Joseph and Savannah with a north–south divided-highway and is the main street in the commercial district of Savannah. After passing North Central Missouri College the highway travels west and northwesterly until it rejoins US 71 in western Nodaway Township of Andrew County.

== Maryville business loop ==
U.S. Route 71 Business
- Location: Maryville, Missouri
- Length: 5.1 mi (8.2 km)

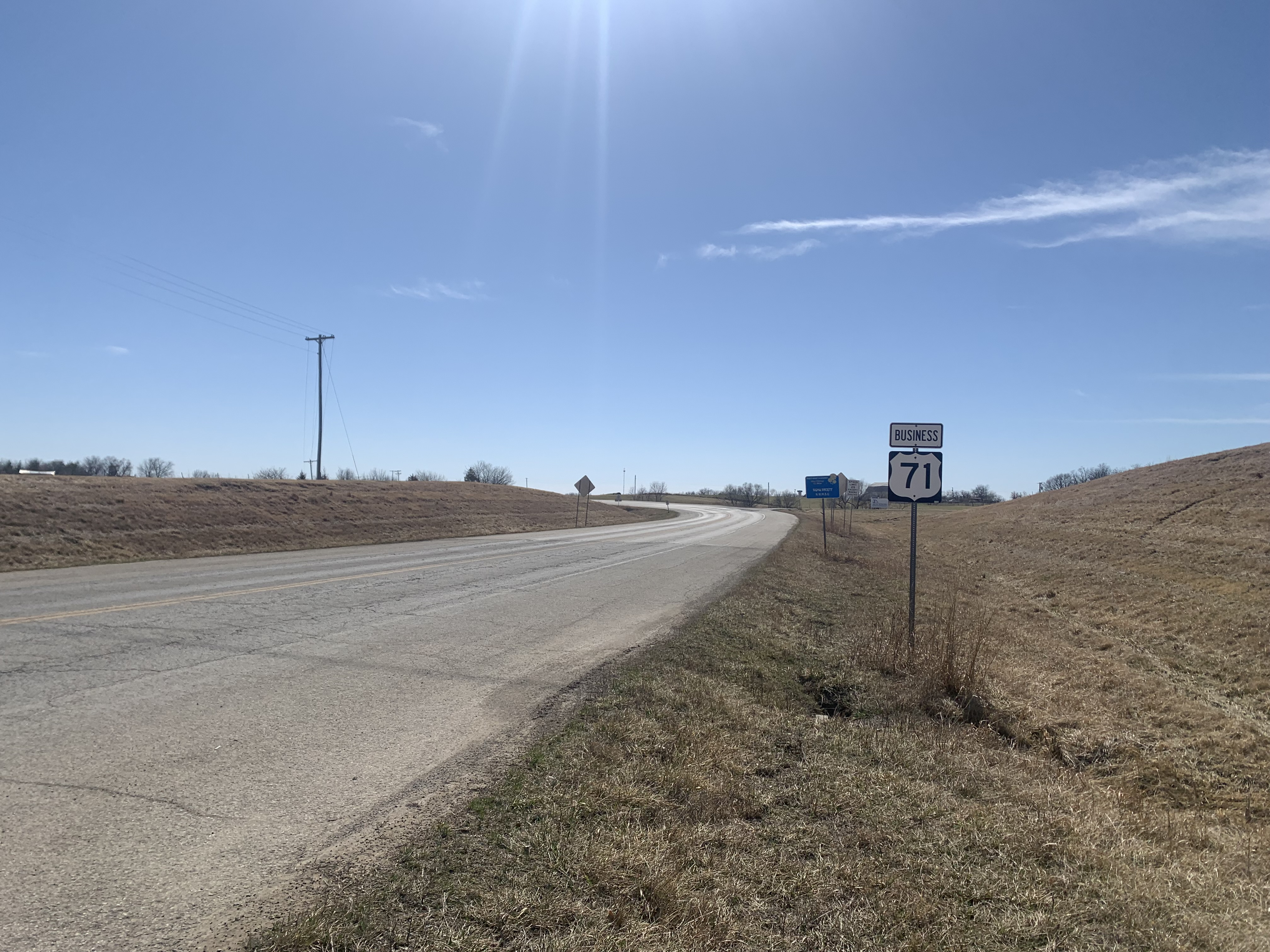
northern terminus of US 71 Business Loop

Business 71 is a former alignment of US 71 through Maryville, Missouri. Running a distance of approximately 5 miles (8.0 km), its southern terminus is at US 71 south of Maryville. Its northern terminus is an intersection with US 71 and US 136 north of Maryville. Within the city of Maryville, this road is known as Main Street.

== Clarinda business loop ==
U.S. Highway 71 Business
- Location: Clarinda, Iowa
- Length: 2.6 mi (4.2 km)

U.S. Route 71 Business is a former alignment of US 71 through Clarinda, Iowa. It begins at the junction of U.S. Route 71 and Iowa Highway 2 in southern Clarinda. Then, it follows 16th Street (Glenn Miller Avenue) towards downtown Clarinda. At Washington Street, US 71 Business meets Iowa 2 Business, and both routes continue east, eventually leaving Clarinda. East of Clarinda, US 71 Bus./IA 2 Bus. intersect US 71. US 71 Business ends while Iowa 2 Business continues south to complete its business loop. The entire route is in Clarinda, Page County.

mi	km	Destinations	Notes
		US 71 / Iowa 2	
		Iowa 2 Business west	Southern end of IA 2 Bus. concurrency
		US 71 / Iowa 2 Business east	Northern end of IA 2 Bus. concurrency
1.000 mi = 1.609 km; 1.000 km = 0.621 mi: Concurrency terminus

== Storm Lake business loop ==
U.S. Highway 71 Business
- Location: Storm Lake, Iowa
- Length: 10.6 mi (17.1 km)

U.S. Route 71 Business is a former alignment of US 71 in Storm Lake, Iowa. It begins at the junction of U.S. Route 71 and Iowa Highway 7. It follows Iowa 7 into Storm Lake along Lakeshore Drive, Flindt Drive, and Milwaukee Avenue. At Lake Avenue, US 71 Business turns north, leaving Iowa 7, where it eventually leaves Storm Lake. Near Truesdale, US 71 Bus. turns east and rejoins US 71. The entire route is in Buena Vista County.

Location	mi	km	Destinations	Notes
Storm Lake			US 71 / Iowa 7 west	Southern end of IA 7 concurrency
Storm Lake			Iowa 7 west (Milwaukee Avenue)	Northern end of IA 7 concurrency
Truesdale			US 71	
1.000 mi = 1.609 km; 1.000 km = 0.621 mi: Concurrency terminus

== Willmar business loop ==
U.S. Highway 71 Business
- Location: Willmar, Minnesota
- Length: 5.5 mi (8.9 km)

Business Trunk Highway 23
- Location: Willmar, Minnesota
- Length: 5.5 mi (8.9 km)

U.S. Highway 71 Business (US 71 Bus.), which is completely concurrent with State Highway 23 Business (MN 23 Bus.) is a city-maintained business loop through the city of Willmar, Minnesota.

The entire route is in Willmar, Kandiyohi County.

mi	km	Destinations	Notes
		US 71 south / MN 23 west – Olivia, Granite Falls	Southern/western terminus
		To US 12 (Litchfield Avenue) – Downtown	
		CSAH 24 west (26th Avenue NE); 23rd Street NE east	Former MN 294; Also access to Ridgewater College, Kandiyohi County Health & Human Services Building
		US 71 north / MN 23 east	Access to northbound US 71/eastbound MN 23 only
1.000 mi = 1.609 km; 1.000 km = 0.621 mi: Incomplete access

== Former routes ==
=== I-49 business routes ===
On December 12, 2012, a portion of US 71 in Missouri was designated as Interstate 49. Four US 71 business routes that connected to the affected section of US 71 were redesignated as I-49 business routes:

- Neosho, Missouri
- Joplin, Missouri
- Nevada, Missouri
- Butler, Missouri

=== Alexandria business loop ===
U.S. Highway 71 Business
- Location: Alexandria, Louisiana
- Existed: 1945–1975

Business 71 is a former alignment of US 71 in Alexandria. It followed the original routing of US 71 before the construction of Alexandria's current highway system. It began at an intersection with Lee Street and MacArthur Drive, and followed Lee Street. It turned west at an intersection with LA 1, following Bolton Avenue to US 165. It was deleted in the mid-1970s.

=== Joplin business loop ===
U.S. Route 71 Business
- Location: Joplin, Missouri
- Existed: by 1945–ca. 1979

US 71 Bus. followed 32nd Street (Route FF), Main Street (Route 43), Broadway Street, St. Louis Avenue, Euclid Avenue, Utica Street, Florida Avenue, and Zora Street through downtown Joplin. From Main Street to Zora Street was originally the 1926 alignment of U.S. Route 66. The part of US 71 that it looped off of is now I-49 Bus. The Joplin business loop was the first such route in Missouri; all others at the time were "city" routes.

=== Joplin alternate ===
U.S. Route 71 Alternate
- Location: Joplin, Missouri
- Existed: 1999

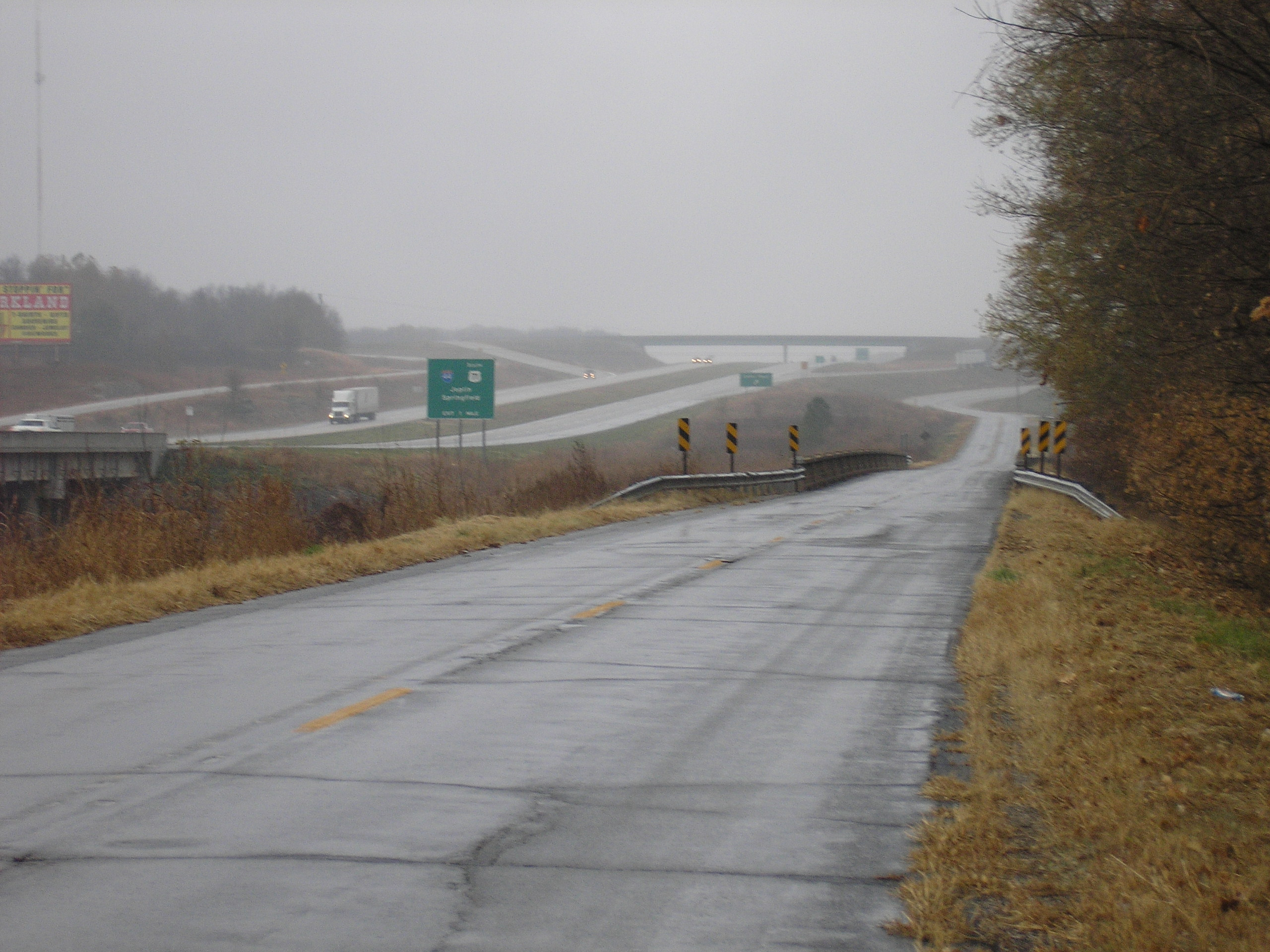
Former Alternate US 71 near Carthage, Missouri. This section is now a frontage road ("outer road" in Missouri) of US 71.

Alternate US 71 was a former special route which provided an alternate route for US 71 between Carthage and Neosho, Missouri, bypassing Joplin. Both endpoints were junctions with US 71. This section of road from Fidelity to Carthage was originally Route 38, renumbered Route 38N in about 1930.

At Carthage, Alternate US 71 followed what is currently Route 571 to US 71 at what is now the intersection of Route 96/Route 571. When the freeway was built around Carthage, it ended at that the current exit of 71 at Route 96/571 and Business US 71.

In 1999, the Alternate 71 designation was deleted. The section north of Interstate 44 at Fidelity was redesignated US 71, with the former US 71 being designated Business 71. South of Interstate 44, it continues as Route 59 to U.S. Route 60. From there it followed US 60 to Neosho. Other than its endpoints, only two towns were located on the former highway: Fidelity, Missouri and Diamond, Missouri.

The road was originally assigned at Optional US 71 in 1932 and changed to Alternate US 71 in 1935.

=== Kansas City bypass ===
U.S. Route 71 Bypass
- Location: Kansas City, Missouri
- Length: 59.0 mi (95.0 km)
- Existed: 1932–1969

U.S. Route 71 Bypass was the original name for a highway that connected Harrisonville, Missouri, to just south of Platte City, where it rejoined US 71 near Kansas City International Airport. When I-29 was opened in the mid-1960s, it was renumbered Route 291.

At Lee's Summit, Missouri, it connects to I-470. It remains concurrent with the Interstate, until I-470 terminates at I-70. Route 291 continues to the north after its junction with I-70. The route has been rerouted several times, and has seen improvements over the years, and continues to be a major highway in eastern Jackson County, Missouri. In Platte and Clay Counties, it also is known as Cookingham Drive, and Mid Continent Trafficway.

=== St. Joseph business loop ===
U.S. Route 71 Business
- Location: St. Joseph, Missouri
- Existed: yes

=== Platte City bypass ===
U.S. Route 71 Bypass
- Location: Platte City, Missouri
- Existed: 1970s
