= Lavaca High School =

Location
- 311 Holly Street; Lavaca, Arkansas 72941-0008; United States; 35°19′58″N 94°10′31″W

Information
- School type: Public comprehensive
- Established: 1915 (111 years ago)
- Status: Open
- School district: Lavaca School District
- Superintendent: Steve Rose
- CEEB code: 041365
- NCES School ID: 050873000587
- Principal: Felicia Owen
- Teaching staff: 65.44 (on FTE basis)
- Grades: 9–12
- Enrollment: 268 (2023-2024)
- Student to teacher ratio: 4.10
- Education system: ADE Smart Core
- Classes offered: Regular, Advanced Placement (AP)
- Colors: Purple and gold
- Athletics: Football, volleyball, cross country, golf, basketball, baseball, softball, track, cheer
- Athletics conference: 3A Region 4 (2012–14)
- Mascot: Golden Arrow
- Team name: Lavaca Golden Arrows
- Accreditation: ADE; AdvancED (1995–)
- Yearbook: The Arrow
- Feeder schools: Lavaca Elementary School (5–8)
- Website: www.lavacaschools.com/o/lhs

Lavaca High School (LHS) is an accredited comprehensive public high school located in the city of Lavaca, Arkansas, United States. Located near Arkansas Highway 255, the school provides secondary education for students in grades 9 through 12 as one of six public high schools in Sebastian County, Arkansas and is the sole high school administered by the Lavaca School District.

The attendance area includes Lavaca, Central City, and a portion of Barling.

== Academics ==
Lavaca High School is accredited by the Arkansas Department of Education (ADE) and has been accredited by AdvancED since 1995. The assumed course of study follows the Smart Core curriculum developed by the ADE. Students complete regular (core and elective) and career focus coursework and exams and may take Advanced Placement (AP) courses and exams with the opportunity to receive college credit.

== Athletics ==
The Lavaca High School mascot and athletic emblem is the Golden Arrow with purple and gold serving as the school colors.

The Lavaca Golden Arrows compete in interscholastic activities within the 3A Classification via the 3A Region 4 Conference, as administered by the Arkansas Activities Association. The Golden Arrows participate in football, volleyball, cross country (boys/girls), golf (boys/girls), basketball (boys/girls), cheer, baseball, softball, and track and field (boys/girls).

In 1986 and 2001, the Lavaca baseball team captured its classification's state championship. In 2008, Lavaca won the 3A state volleyball championship.
