= State Highway 96 Bridge =

- U.S. National Register of Historic Places
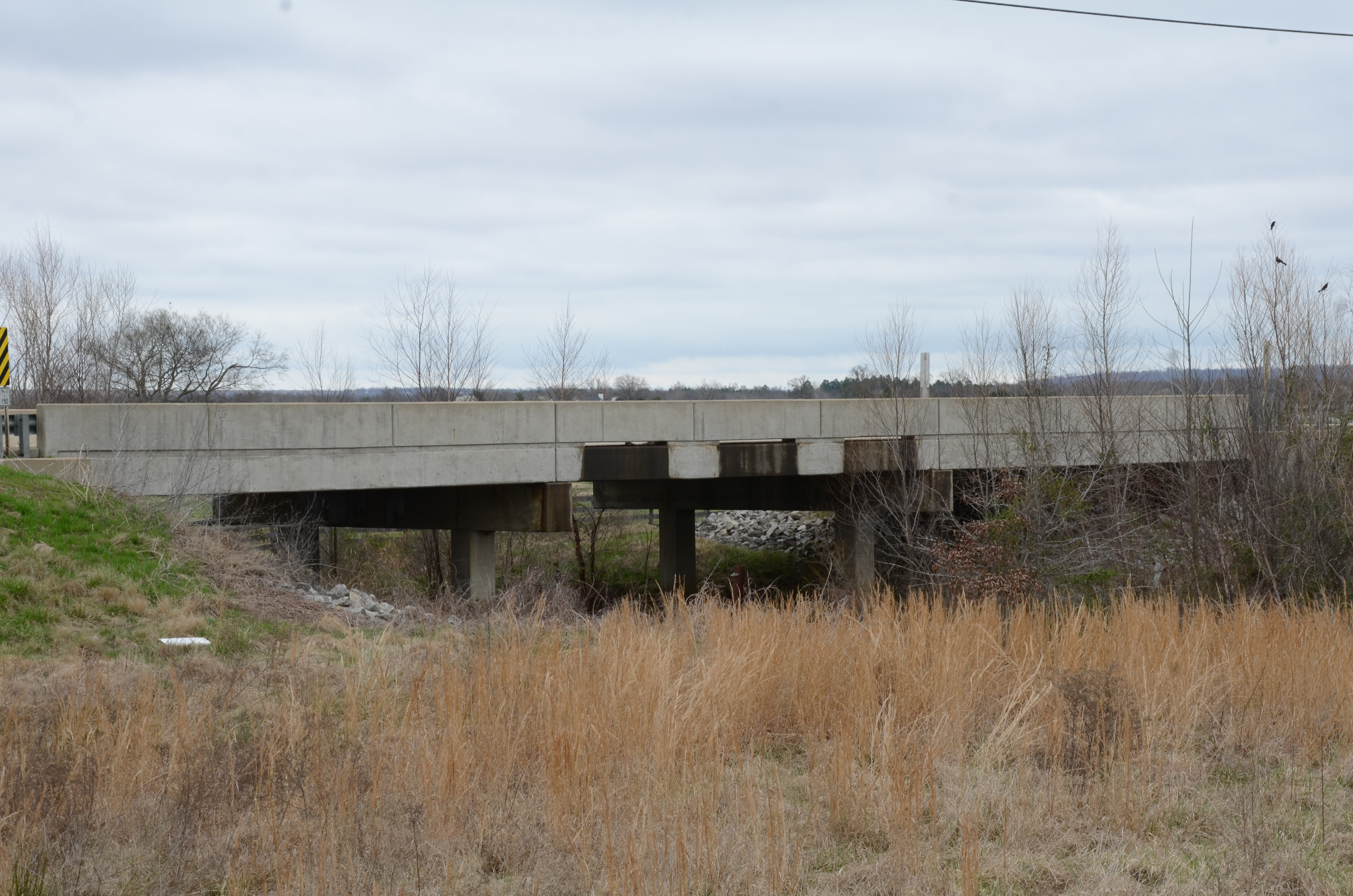

- Location within Arkansas Location within the United States
- Nearest city: Greenwood, Arkansas
- Coordinates: 35°13′8″N 94°13′16″W
- Area: less than one acre
- Built: 1938
- Architectural style: Steel Pony Truss
- MPS: Historic Bridges of Arkansas MPS
- NRHP reference No.: 95000564
- Added to NRHP: May 5, 1995

The State Highway 96 Bridge is a modern steel girder bridge with a concrete deck, carrying Arkansas Highway 96 across Vache Grass Creek east of Greenwood, Arkansas. It is a replacement for a historic steel pony truss bridge, built in 1938. The historic bridge was listed on the National Register of Historic Places in 1995.

== See also ==
- National Register of Historic Places listings in Sebastian County, Arkansas
- List of bridges on the National Register of Historic Places in Arkansas
