= Arkansas Highway 162 =

State highway in Arkansas, United States

Highway 162

Route information
- Maintained by ArDOT

Section 1
- Length: 5.39 mi (8.67 km)
- West end: AR 59 in Cedarville
- East end: CR 24 (Hobbtown Rd) at Hobbtown

Section 2
- Length: 11.29 mi (18.17 km)
- West end: US 64 / US 71B in Van Buren
- East end: I-40 / US 71 / US 71B in Alma

Location
- Country: United States
- State: Arkansas
- Counties: Crawford

Highway system
- Arkansas Highway System; Interstate; US; State; Business; Spurs; Suffixed; Scenic; Heritage
← AR 161	→ AR 163

Highway 162 (AR 162, Ark. 162, and Hwy. 162) is a designation for two east–west state highways in Crawford County, Arkansas. One segment of 5.39 miles (8.67 km) runs east from Highway 59 in Cedarville to Crawford County Road 25 (Hobbtown Rd) at Hobbtown. A second route of 11.29 miles (18.17 km) begins at US 64/US 71B in Van Buren and runs east to Interstate 40/US 71/US 71B (I-40/US 71/US 71B) in Alma. Both routes are maintained by the Arkansas State Highway and Transportation Department (AHTD).

== Route description ==
=== Cedarville to Hobbtown ===
Highway 162 begins at Highway 59 in Cedarville. The route heads east before ending and becoming Crawford CR 24/Hobbtown Road just after a bridge over East Cedar Creek.

=== Van Buren to Alma ===
The route begins at US 64/US 71B in Van Buren in the southeast portion of the city. The route runs due east, passing underneath I-540/US 71 with no interchange. It continues east through Kibler to Alma.

== History ==
The segment between Van Buren and Alma was added to the state highway system between 1952 and 1953. The segment between Cedarville and Hobbs was added to the state highway system on June 28, 1973. The original Highway 162 was designated in 1937 from Highway 120 east of Luxora southward to the end of state maintenance. This highway was removed from the state highway system by 1939. The second Highway 162 was designated between 1942 and 1945 from Highway 7 in El Dorado to US 167 (now Smith Avenue). This road was removed from the state highway system by 1951.

== Major intersections ==
The entire route is in Crawford County.

Location	mi	km	Destinations	Notes
Cedarville	0.00	0.00	AR 59 – Van Buren, Evansville	Western terminus
Hobbtown	5.39	8.67	CR 24 (Hobbtown Rd)	Eastern terminus
Highway 162 begins in Van Buren
Van Buren	0.00	0.00	US 64 / US 71B	Western terminus
Kibler			I-49 – Fort Smith, Fayetteville	Proposed interchange
Alma	10.54	16.96	US 64B east (Cherry St)	US 64B western terminus
Alma	10.90	17.54	US 64 / US 71B	Begin US 71B overlap
Alma	11.29	18.17	I-40 / US 71 / US 71B – Fort Smith, Little Rock, Fayetteville	Eastern terminus
1.000 mi = 1.609 km; 1.000 km = 0.621 mi: Concurrency terminus; Unopened

== See also ==
- List of state highways in Arkansas
