= Arkansas Highway 96 =

State highway in Arkansas, United States

Highway 96

Route information
- Maintained by ArDOT
- Existed: April 1, 1926–present

Section 1
- Length: 38.2 mi (61.5 km)
- West end: AR 10 in Greenwood
- East end: AR 23

Section 2
- Length: 1.84 mi (2.96 km)
- West end: AR 23 in Ozark
- East end: AR 219 in Ozark

Location
- Country: United States
- State: Arkansas
- Counties: Sebastian, Franklin

Highway system
- Arkansas Highway System; Interstate; US; State; Business; Spurs; Suffixed; Scenic; Heritage
← AR 95	→ AR 97

Highway 96 (AR 96, Ark. 96, and Hwy. 96) is a designation for two east–west state highways in the Arkansas River Valley. One route of 38.2 miles (61.5 km) begins at Highway 10 in Greenwood and runs north and east to Highway 23 south of Ozark. A second route of 1.84 miles (2.96 km) in Ozark begins at Highway 23 and runs east to Highway 219. Both routes are maintained by the Arkansas State Highway and Transportation Department (AHTD).

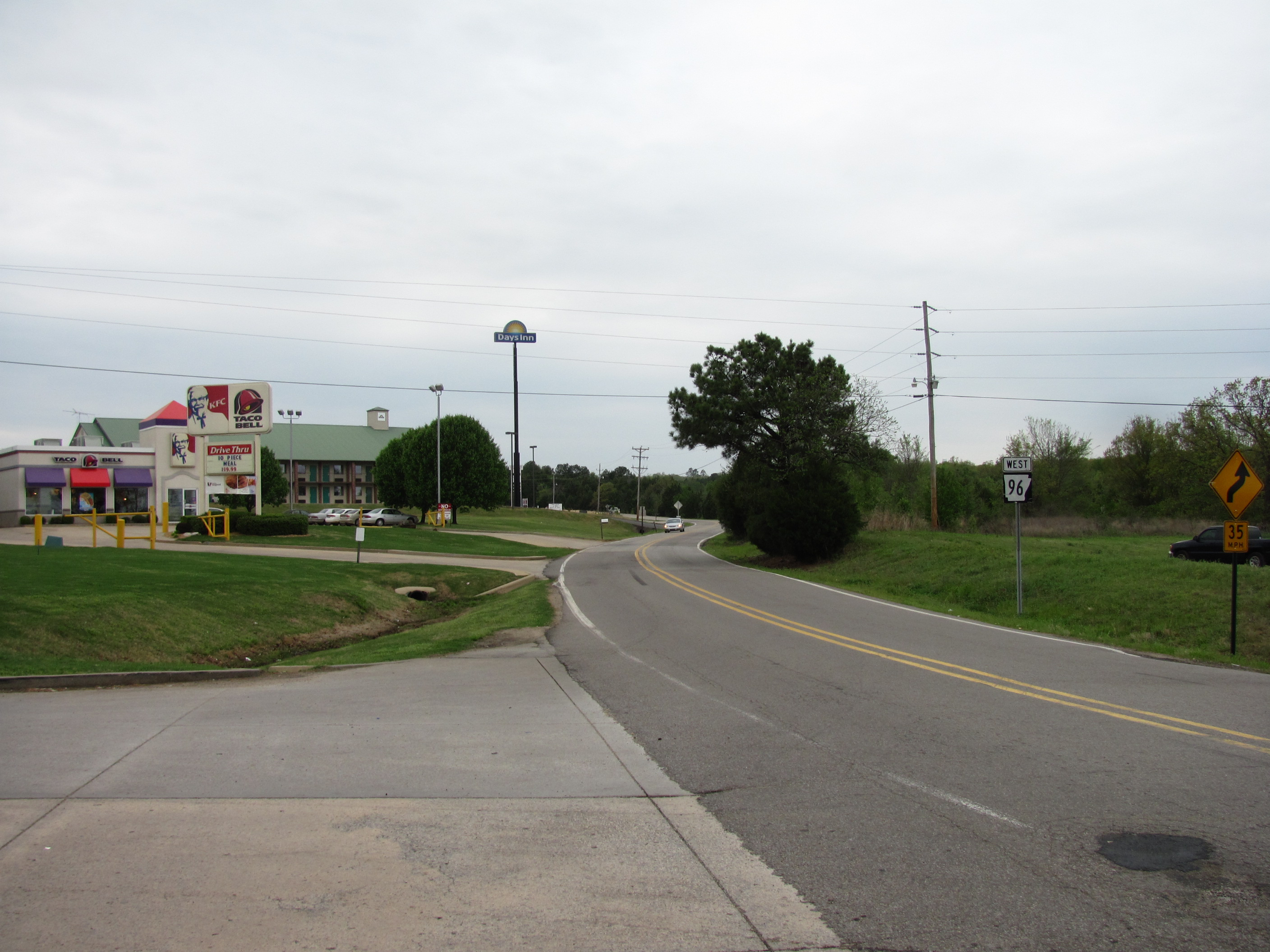
Westbound in Ozark, Arkansas

== Route description ==
The southern portion of AR 96 begins at the Oklahoma state line west of Hartford. It runs through Hartford and east to Mansfield, where it ends at U.S. Route 71.

AR 96 begins at AR 10 in Greenwood. The route runs north through Fort Chaffee and crosses AR 22 and AR 255. It continues north then east to cross AR 41 and eventually terminate at AR 23 in Franklin County.

== History ==
Highway 96 was created during the 1926 Arkansas state highway numbering as a connector route between State Road 10 in Greenwood and State Road 22 west of Charleston.

The segment in Ozark was known as Highway 309 until September 25, 1991, when the route was redesignated as Highway 96 due to confusion with another nearby segment of Highway 309.

== Major intersections ==
County	Location	mi	km	Destinations	Notes
Sebastian	Greenwood	0.00	0.00	AR 10 (Center St) – Booneville	Western terminus
Sebastian	Fort Chaffee	8.3	13.4	AR 22 – Charleston, Fort Smith	
Sebastian	Lavaca	10.3– 10.7	16.6– 17.2	AR 255 (Main St/Division St) – Barling	
Sebastian	Lavaca	10.9	17.5	AR 253 north	AR 253 southern terminus
Sebastian		16.0	25.7	AR 217 south – Charleston	AR 217 northern terminus
Sebastian		18.0	29.0	AR 252 east	AR 252 western terminus
Franklin		24.9	40.1	AR 215 south – Charleston	AR 215 northern terminus
Franklin	Cecil	31.2	50.2	AR 41	
Franklin		38.2	61.5	AR 23 – Booneville, Ozark	Eastern terminus
Franklin	Gap in route				
Franklin	Ozark	0.00	0.00	AR 23 north (18th St)	Western terminus
Franklin	Ozark	1.84	2.96	AR 219 (3rd St)	Eastern terminus
1.000 mi = 1.609 km; 1.000 km = 0.621 mi: Concurrency terminus

== See also ==
- List of state highways in Arkansas
