= Interstate 540 (Arkansas) =

Highway in Arkansas

Interstate 540
- I-540 highlighted in red

Route information
- Auxiliary route of I-40
- Maintained by ArDOT
- Length: 14.7 mi (23.7 km)
- Existed: 1965–present
- NHS: Entire route

Major junctions
- South end: US 271 / SH-9 at the Oklahoma state line
- US 71 / US 71B in Fort Smith; US 64 / US 71B in Van Buren
- North end: I-40 / US 71 in Van Buren

Location
- Country: United States
- State: Arkansas
- Counties: Sebastian, Crawford

Highway system
- Interstate Highway System; Main; Auxiliary; Suffixed; Business; Future; Arkansas Highway System; Interstate; US; State; Business; Spurs; Suffixed; Scenic; Heritage
← I-530	→ AR 549

Interstate 540 (I-540) is a freeway spur route of I-40 in the U.S. state of Arkansas. The total length is 14.7 miles (23.7 km). At first, I-540 was a short spur connecting Fort Smith and Van Buren to I-40 as one of the original five Arkansas Interstates. The route ran 14.7 miles (23.7 km) to the Oklahoma state line to I-40 in Van Buren. The growing Northwest Arkansas area and the University of Arkansas needed an Interstate connection to Little Rock, and through traffic north to Kansas City had also outgrown the winding US 71 north from I-40. The route was extended north to Mountainburg in the late 1990s on an all-new alignment (going under concurrency with I-40, one of the only auxiliary routes with a concurrency with its parent) with the route being completed to Bella Vista in January 1999. However, the segment north of I-40 became a part of I-49 in 2014.

== Route description ==
The older portion of I-540, completed in the 1970s, connects I-40 southward to the Oklahoma state line, going through Van Buren and Fort Smith. This particular spur starts at exit 7 on I-40 (being seven miles (11 km) east of the state line with Oklahoma). That point marks mile 0 on this spur, in keeping with Interstate Highway rules that spur mileage begins at the "parent" route. The first three miles (4.8 km) are through Van Buren before the bridge over the Arkansas River. The remainder, for a grand total of approximately 15 miles (24 km), travels through Fort Smith. The Arkansas Highway and Transportation Department (AHTD), now the Arkansas Department of Transportation (ArDOT), bid a $79-million (equivalent to $105 million in 2024) project in 2013 for I-540 rehabilitation in Fort Smith that includes resigning the route and renumbering the exits.

=== Fort Smith route ===
Beginning at the I-540 and I-40 junction in Van Buren, the route begins southward along the eastern boundary of Van Buren, with exits numbered sequentially heading south. The segment is largely concurrent with US 71. The first exit along this segment of I-540/US 71 is with US 64 and U.S. Highway 71 Business (US 71B), which leads west into the Van Buren Historic District and east to Alma. Continuing south, I-540/US 71 passes over Highway 162 (AR 162, Kibler Road), with no access between the routes. An exit providing access to AR 59, via Riggs Drive (southbound) or Twin Circle Drive (northbound), is just prior crossing the Arkansas River. After crossing the river, the highways enter Fort Smith and Sebastian County. I-540/US 71 run through a commercial area and has three exits with city collector roads before an exit for Phoenix Avenue, which gives access to Fort Smith Regional Airport. However, this exit does not have any access to southbound I-540/US 71.

Now turning toward the southwest, I-540/US 71 have exits with AR 45 (Greenwood Road) and AR 255 (Zero Street). Following these intersections, US 71 departs I-540 southbound toward Texarkana, with US 71B terminating at the parent route at the exit. I-540 begins to pass through a residential area before its final exit at US 271 and AR 253. Following this exit, the roadway continues but ceases to be I-540, becoming US 271 and entering Oklahoma.

== History ==
The Interstate spur opened in phases. According to a 1970 road map of Fort Smith, exits 2–11 (Van Buren through the Zero Street exit) were opened, with later exits (12–14) and the roadway itself still under construction. Portions of the roadway that became I-540 around Fayetteville were built in the early 1970s but upgraded and extended in the mid-1990s. The highway around Fayetteville originally received US 71 signage until the complete I-540 spur was opened.

Originally, I-540 running from I-40 to Oklahoma through Fort Smith was signed east–west, but, with the construction of the spur that ran north through Northwest Arkansas to Bella Vista, the entire I-540 was resigned as a north–south road. It is one of the few that have changed this way.

In the late 1990s, I-540 was extended into Northwest Arkansas. It had been planned since the 1970s as a bypass of US 71. The first section, between Alma and Mountainburg, was known as AR 540. Originally, the AHTD asked the American Association of State Highway and Transportation Officials (AASHTO), who are in charge of Interstate and U.S. Highway route numbering, to allow the Interstate segment between Fort Smith and Bentonville to be redesignated as I-49 in order to emphasize plans to extend the route from Shreveport, Louisiana, through Arkansas to Kansas City, Missouri. AASHTO refused and the route opened on January 8, 1999, as a northern extension of I-540. On October 18, 2013, AASHTO approved AHTD's application to designate I-49 across the state, specifically allowing the state to renumber I-540 as I-49. The northern section of I-540 was redesignated as I-49 in April 2014.

== Exit list ==
County	Location	mi	km	Exit	Destinations	Notes
Sebastian		14.72	23.69		US 271 south / SH-9 west – Spiro, Oklahoma	Continuation into Oklahoma; southern end of US 271 concurrency
Sebastian	Fort Smith	14.06	22.63	14	US 271 north / AR 253 south	Northern end of US 271 concurrency; northern terminus of AR 253
Sebastian	Fort Smith	13.06	21.02	13	Jenny Lind Road	
Sebastian	Fort Smith	12.14	19.54	12	US 71 south / US 71B north – Texarkana	Southern end of US 71 concurrency; US 71B not signed
Sebastian	Fort Smith	11.08	17.83	11	AR 255 (Zero Street)	
Sebastian	Fort Smith	10.06– 10.34	16.19– 16.64	10	AR 45 south (Greenwood Road) / Phoenix Avenue west	Northern terminus of AR 45
Sebastian	Fort Smith	9.54	15.35	9	Leigh Avenue / Phoenix Avenue east – Airport	No southbound entrance
Sebastian	Fort Smith	7.99	12.86	8	AR 22 (Rogers Avenue)	Signed as exits 8B (east) and 8A (west) southbound
Sebastian	Fort Smith	6.23	10.03	6	Grand Avenue	
Sebastian	Fort Smith	4.94	7.95	5	Kelley Highway	
Arkansas River		3.05– 3.52	4.91– 5.66	Bridge		
Crawford	Van Buren	2.87	4.62	3	AR 59 – Van Buren	
Crawford	Van Buren	0.55	0.89	2	US 64 (US 71B) – Van Buren	Signed as exits 2B (east) and 2A (west)
Crawford	Van Buren	0.00	0.00	1	I-40 (US 71 north) – Little Rock, Memphis, Oklahoma City	Northern terminus; northern end of US 71 concurrency; signed as exits 1B (east) and 1A (west); exit 7 on I-40
1.000 mi = 1.609 km; 1.000 km = 0.621 mi: Concurrency terminus; Incomplete access

== Arkansas Highway 540 ==
Highway 540
- Location: Crawford County
- Length: 12 mi (19 km)
- Existed: June 7, 1995–January 8, 1999

Highway 540 (AR 540, Ark. 540, and Hwy. 540) was a temporary designation for what would later become I-540 between Alma and Mountainburg in the US state of Arkansas. Traveling a distance of approximately 12 miles (19 km), its southern terminus was at I-40 west of Alma and its northern terminus at US 71 in Mountainburg.
