= Lavaca School District =

School district in Arkansas, United States

Location
- 203 Fir Street; Lavaca, Arkansas 72941 United States

District information
- Grades: PK–12
- Established: 1915
- Superintendent: Steve Rose
- Accreditation: Arkansas Department of Education
- Schools: 3
- NCES District ID: 0508730

Students and staff
- Students: 915
- Teachers: 69.15 (on FTE basis)
- Staff: 105.54 (on FTE basis)
- Student–teacher ratio: 13.23
- Athletic conference: 3A Region 4 (2012–14)
- District mascot: Golden Arrows
- Colors: Purple; Gold

Other information
- Website: www.lavacaschools.com

Lavaca School District (or Lavaca Public Schools) is a public school district based in Lavaca, Arkansas, United States. The school district encompasses 58.77 square miles (152.2 km^{2}) of land in Sebastian County, Arkansas. The district includes Lavaca, Central City, and a section of Barling.

Established in 1915, the district provides comprehensive education for pre-kindergarten through grade 12 is accredited by the Arkansas Department of Education (ADE).

== Schools ==
- Lavaca High School, serves more than 250 students in grades 9 through 12.
- Lavaca Middle School, serves more than 250 students in grades 5 through 8.
- Lavaca Elementary School, serving more than 350 students in pre-kindergarten and 4.

In 2012, the school received a Silver Award in the HealthierUS School Challenge that recognizes excellence in nutrition and physical activity by the Food and Nutrition Service of the U.S. Department of Agriculture.
