= Arkansas Highway 219 =

State highway in Arkansas, United States

Highway 219

Route information
- Maintained by ArDOT
- Existed: July 10, 1957–present

Section 1
- Length: 10.88 mi (17.51 km)
- South end: US 64 in Ozark
- North end: CR 312

Section 2
- Length: 1.50 mi (2.41 km)
- South end: CR 71
- North end: US 64 near Ozark

Location
- Country: United States
- State: Arkansas

Highway system
- Arkansas Highway System; Interstate; US; State; Business; Spurs; Suffixed; Scenic; Heritage
← AR 218	→ AR 220

Arkansas Highway 219 (AR 219, Hwy. 219) is a designation for two state highways in Franklin County, Arkansas. The southern segment of 1.50 miles (2.41 km) runs from Youth with a Mission Ozarks northeast to Ozark. A northern segment of 10.88 miles (17.51 km) runs from U.S. Route 64 (US 64) through Ozark northeast to the Missouri state line.

== Route description ==
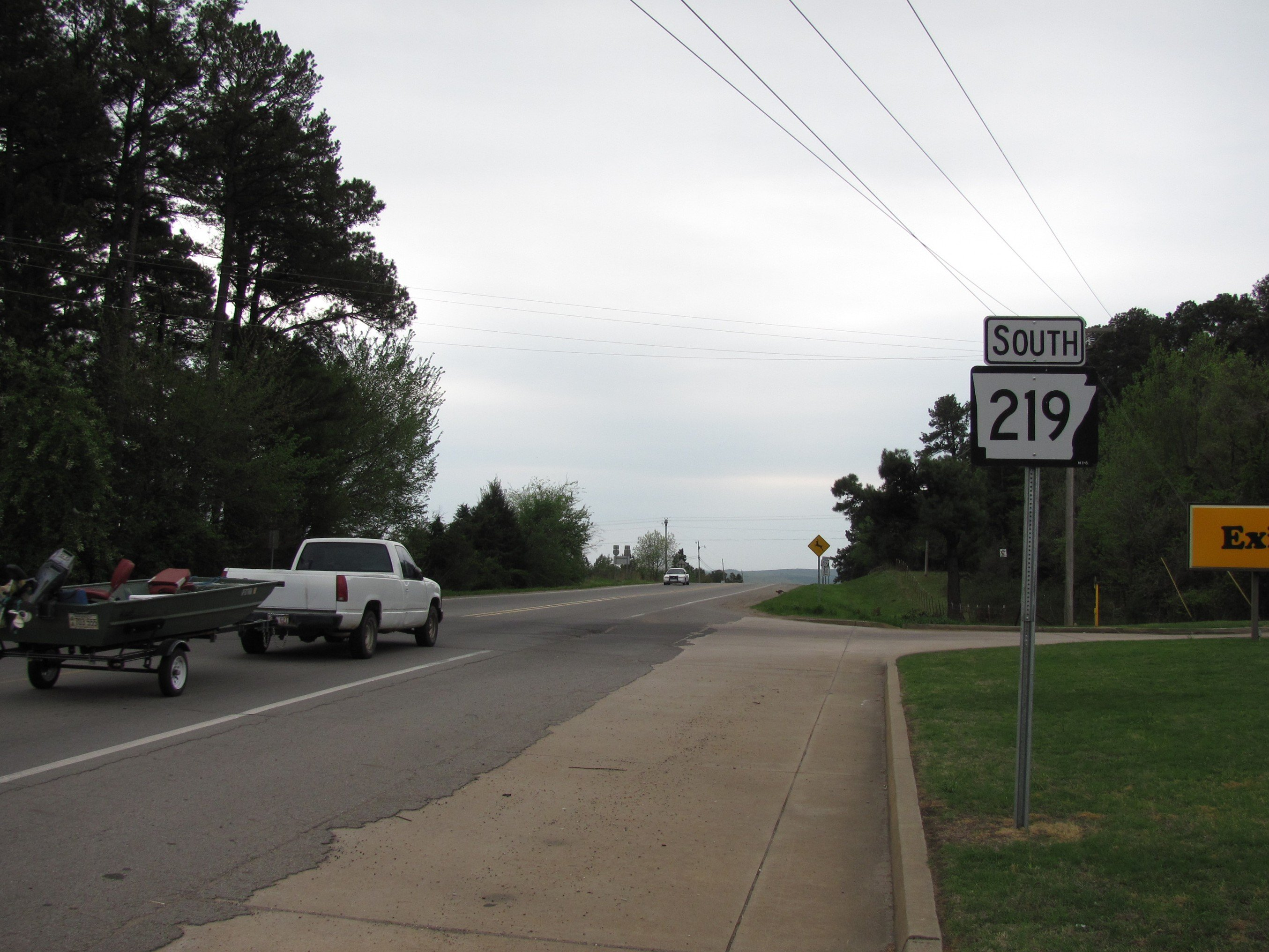
Southbound in Ozark

=== Ozark to CR 312 ===
AR 219 begins in Ozark at US 64 near the Ozark Courthouse Square Historic District, which is listed on the National Register of Historic Places listings in Franklin County, Arkansas. The route runs north through Ozark, including a junction with Airport Rd, which provides access to the Ozark-Franklin County Airport. AR 219 continues north over Interstate 40 (I-40) to intersect AR 352 in Mountain Grove. After Mountain Grove, AR 219 continues north to terminate at County Road 312 near a church in rural Franklin County. The road is entirely two-lane undivided.

=== Youth with a Mission Ozarks to Ozark ===
AR 219 begins at County Road 71 near Youth with a Mission Ozarks and runs north to terminate at US 64. This portion does not cross or concur with any other state highways. The route is near the Arkansas River, and is a curved, narrow, two-lane road for its entire length.

== History ==
Highway 219 from Ozark north to an area around Mountain Top was added to the state highway system by the Arkansas State Highway Commission on July 10, 1957. The route was paved around 1963, and again most recently in 1975. The shorter route was added to the state highway system in 1966. The route has not been repaved or reconstructed since its addition to the state highway system.

== Major intersections ==
=== Southern segment ===
The entire route is in Franklin County.

Location	mi	km	Destinations	Notes
	0.0	0.0	CR 71 (Mountain View Rd)	Entrance to Youth with a Mission Ozarks
Ozark	1.50	2.41	US 64 (W Commercial St) – Altus, Mulberry, Alma	
1.000 mi = 1.609 km; 1.000 km = 0.621 mi

=== Northern segment ===
The entire route is in Franklin County.

Location	mi	km	Destinations	Notes
Ozark	0.0	0.0	US 64 (W Commercial St)	
Ozark	1.79	2.88	AR 96 west (Airport Rd) – Airport	AR 96 eastern terminus
Ozark	2.05	3.30	I-40 – Little Rock, Fort Smith	Exit 37 (I-40)
Mountain Grove	3.71	5.97	AR 352 to AR 23	
	10.88	17.51	CR 312 (Mountain Top Rd)	
1.000 mi = 1.609 km; 1.000 km = 0.621 mi
