= Special routes of U.S. Route 271 =

Special routes of U.S. Route 271

Highway system
- United States Numbered Highway System; List; Special; Divided

Several special routes of U.S. Route 271 exist, including the following:

== Texas ==
=== Pittsburg business loop ===
Business U.S. Highway 271-H
- Location: Pittsburg
- Length: 1.81 mi (2.91 km)
- Existed: March 31, 2016–present

=== Mount Pleasant business loop ===
Business U.S. Highway 271-E
- Location: Mount Pleasant
- Length: 8.4 mi (13.5 km)
- Existed: 1990–present

=== Bogata business loop ===
Business U.S. Highway 271-D
- Location: Bogata
- Length: 1.656 mi (2.665 km)
- Existed: 1990–present

Business U.S. Highway 271-D (Bus. US 271-D) is a business route of U.S. Highway 271 (US 271) in Bogata, Texas that is 1.656 miles (2.665 km) long. It starts at US 271 in the center of Bogata, and goes through town, intersecting Texas State Highway 37 along the way. It then ends at US 271 outside of town. It is former Loop 38, of which the spur, Spur 38, still exists.

Major intersections

The entire route is in Red River County.

| Location | mi | km | Destinations | Notes |
|---|---|---|---|---|
| Bogata | 0.000 | 0.000 | US 271 (Broadway) | Southern terminus |
| Bogata | 0.06 | 0.097 | FM 909 (Clarksville Street) | |
| Bogata | 0.6 | 0.97 | Spur 38 north (North Main Street) | |
| Bogata | 0.8 | 1.3 | SH 37 | |
| | 1.656 | 2.665 | US 271 | Northern terminus |
1.000 mi = 1.609 km; 1.000 km = 0.621 mi

=== Deport business loop ===
Business U.S. Highway 271-C
- Location: Deport
- Length: 1.069 mi (1.720 km)
- Existed: 1990–present

=== Paris loop ===
Business U.S. Highway 271-B
- Location: Paris
- Length: 4.193 mi (6.748 km)
- Existed: 1990–present

Business U.S. Highway 271-B (Bus. US 271-B) is a business route of US 271 in Texas that is 4.193 miles (6.748 km) in length. It runs through the downtown of Paris, Texas, which U.S. 271 bypasses. It starts at an interchange with US 271 and Loop 286. and heads towards downtown Paris, intersecting multiple city streets. Close to the center of town, the route turns north onto US 82-H (12th Street), forming a concurrency. It then turns west onto Lamar Ave and continues heading towards downtown Paris. In the center of town, the route turns north on Main Street and the concurrency ends. Before the route ends it intersects multiple city streets. The route ends at another interchange with US 271, US 82, and Loop 286.

Major intersections

The entire highway is in Paris, Lamar County.

| mi | km | Destinations | Notes |
|---|---|---|---|
| 0.000 | 0.000 | US 271 / Loop 286 | Southern terminus |
| 2.2 | 3.5 | Bus. US 82 (12th Street SE) | Southern end of concurrency with US 82 BUS |
| 3.1 | 5.0 | Bus. US 82 west (Bonham Street) | Northern end of concurrency with US 82 BUS |
| 4.193 | 6.748 | US 271 / US 82 / Loop 286 | Northern terminus |
1.000 mi = 1.609 km; 1.000 km = 0.621 mi: Concurrency terminus

== Oklahoma ==
=== Hugo ===
U.S. Highway 271 Business
- Location: Hugo
- Length: 4.2 mi (6.8 km)
- Existed: 2019

U.S. 271 Business (Bus. US 271) was a business route of US 271 in Hugo, Oklahoma which is 4.2 miles (6.8 km) long. It starts at an interchange with US 271 and U.S. Route 70, goes into Hugo, and then runs concurrently with U.S. Route 70 Business until they both end at an interchange with US 271, US 70, and the Indian Nation Turnpike. The route was decommissioned in 2019 to keep highway traffic from passing through Hugo.

Major intersections

The entire route is in Choctaw County.

| Location | mi | km | Destinations | Notes |
|---|---|---|---|---|
| | 0.0 | 0.0 | US 271 west / US 70 east/west to Indian Nation Turnpike – Antlers, Idabel | Southern terminus |
| Hugo | 1.6 | 2.6 | US 70 Bus. (East Jackson Street) – Kiamichi Technology Center | Southern end of concurrency with US 70 Bus. |
| | 4.2 | 6.8 | Indian Nation Turnpike north / US 271 / US 70 – Antlers, Durant, McAlester, Idabel, Paris | Northern terminus and northern end of concurrency with US 70 Bus. |
1.000 mi = 1.609 km; 1.000 km = 0.621 mi: Concurrency terminus

== See also ==
- List of special routes of the United States Numbered Highway System
