= U.S. Route 271 =

Highway in the United States

U.S. Route 271

Route information
- Auxiliary route of US 71
- Length: 297.3 mi (478.5 km)
- Existed: 1926–present

Major junctions
- South end: SH 31 / SH 155 at Tyler, TX
- I-20 near Winona, TX; US 80 in Gladewater, TX; I-30 in Mount Pleasant, TX; Indian Nation Turnpike near Antlers, OK; I-540 / AR 253 in Fort Smith, AR
- North end: US 71B / AR 255 at Fort Smith, AR

Location
- Country: United States
- States: Texas, Oklahoma, Arkansas

Highway system
- United States Numbered Highway System; List; Special; Divided

U.S. Route 271 (US 271, US-271) is a north–south United States highway. Never a long highway, it went from bi-state route (Arkansas and Oklahoma) to a tri-state route (Arkansas, Oklahoma and Texas). Its southern terminus is in Tyler, Texas, at an intersection with State Highway 31 and SH 155. The highway's northern terminus is in Fort Smith, Arkansas, at an intersection with Business U.S. Route 71 and AR 255. It enters Arkansas from Oklahoma as a controlled-access highway, but the highway continues as Interstate 540 when US 271 exits toward downtown after one-half mile (800 m) in Arkansas.

== Route description ==
=== Texas ===
US 271 begins in Tyler at an intersection with SH 31 (Front Street) and SH 155, and thus runs northward concurrent with SH 155. At 1 mile, there is an intersection with Spur 147 which runs across the north side of the city to connect with Broadway and then US 69.

At 3.2 miles is the intersection with Loop 323. The site of Camp Ford, a Confederate POW camp during the Civil War, is encompassed by a former TxDOT picnic area now maintained by Smith County at this junction. The SH 155 concurrency ends at 8 miles, near the University of Texas Health Science Center at Tyler. SH 155 goes to Gilmer via Winona and Big Sandy. The easier route between Tyler and Gilmer is US 271.

At 12.7 miles is the interchange with Interstate 20, signed for Dallas (west) and Longview (east). North of the interstate, US 271 passes through Gladewater where there are junctions with SH 135 and US 80. Trucks are required to use Loop 485, a bypass around the east side of town, if they are following US 271 through the area or if they want to turn onto US 80.

North of Gladewater, US 271 passes through Gilmer, where there are junctions with SH 300 and SH 154. There is also another concurrency (only 1.5 miles) with SH 155 which then veers to the northeast toward Linden. North of Gilmer is Pittsburg, where US 271 intersects with SH 11. Then the highway crosses Big Cypress Creek just below the dam that forms Lake Bob Sandlin. In Mount Pleasant, there are junctions with SH 49 and US 67 and then the interchange with Interstate 30. Beyond IH 30 are the small towns of Talco, Bogata (junction with SH 37), Deport, and Pattonville.

In Paris, US 271 runs concurrently with Loop 286 and US 82 around the east and northeast sides of the city. After splitting northward from the loop, US 271 is a four-lane divided highway into Oklahoma, crossing the Red River 15 miles north of Paris and 10 miles south of Hugo.

=== Oklahoma ===
North of the Red River, US 271 continues as a four-lane highway. The Choctaw Nation operates a casino on the west side of the highway where US 271 is concurrent with SH 109. North of the junction with SH 109 west is the intersection with SH 271A, the only lettered spur along US 271, which runs westward to the Goodland Academy.

From Hugo westward eight miles, US 271 runs in a concurrency with U.S. 70. The southern terminus of the Indian Nation Turnpike is an interchange on this concurrency. The ODOT roadside park at the west end of the concurrency is the only one on the entire route of US 271 in Oklahoma.

Northward, US 271 is a two-lane road. It goes under the turnpike without an interchange before entering Antlers, where there is a concurrency with SH 3 through town. Leaving Antlers, US 271 crosses the Kiamichi River. The road to Clayton is sinuous and scenic, passing through hilly woodlands. The route passes through the communities of Snow and Finley, followed by the western terminus of SH 144 before passing the Clayton Lake State Park and then crossing the Kiamichi again. There are weight limits of 15 tons (depending on vehicle length) posted between SH 144 and Clayton.

In Clayton, there is a concurrency with SH 2, which to the south is the better through travel route from Antlers. The town has a monument that indicates that the highway was built by convict labor in 1925. From Clayton, US 271 takes on an easterly trajectory, passing Tuskahoma and Albion, before turning northward prior to Talihina. In Talihina, there is a brief concurrency with SH 63. From Talihina eastward eight miles, US 271 runs concurrently with SH 1 until the beginning of the Talimena Scenic Drive. North and south of this intersection there are scenic overlooks. US 271 thus continues northward for another 15 miles to a T intersection with US 270, with which it runs concurrently for six miles into Wister. From Wister, US 271 runs northeasterly to Poteau. From Poteau via Panama to SH 9, the highway is co-signed with U.S. 59. Then, US 271 runs concurrently with SH 9 through Spiro to the Arkansas line near Pocola. Almost all of the route between Poteau and the state line is four-lane divided highway.

=== Arkansas ===
The route runs for 3 miles (4.8 km) in Arkansas, all within Fort Smith. Its northern terminus is at Business U.S. 71 and Highway 255 in Fort Smith.

== History ==
In 1926, US 271 was commissioned between Fort Smith, Arkansas, and Mena, Arkansas, by way of Spiro and Poteau, Oklahoma, but the route south of Poteau was turned over to U.S. Route 270 (and later, U.S. Route 59) in 1930. US 271 was then re-routed through Talihina and Hugo, Oklahoma, as well as Paris and Tyler, Texas, towards Beaumont near the Gulf of Mexico. The Tyler-to-Beaumont leg was taken over by U.S. Route 69 in 1934.

US 271's original northern terminus was at an intersection with U.S. Route 64 and U.S. Route 71 in Fort Smith. It has since been realigned twice: once beginning at U.S. 71 and Y Street then crossing into Oklahoma at Arkoma, the second time to its current terminus in southern Fort Smith. The Arkansas State Highway Commission ordered for US 271 to be extended along Highway 59 to the Missouri state line (pending AASHTO approval) in 1960. Approval was not given by the national organization.

== Major intersections ==
State	County	Location	mi	km	Destinations	Notes
Texas	Smith	Tyler	0.0	0.0	SH 31 (Front Street) / SH 155 south (Beckham Avenue south)	Southern terminus; south end of SH 155 overlap; road continues as SH 155 south (Beckham Ave.)
Texas	Smith	Tyler	1.0	1.6	Spur 147 west (Gentry Parkway) – Downtown Tyler	
Texas	Smith	Tyler	1.7	2.7	FM 14 north (East M.L. King Jr. Boulevard) – Texas College, Caldwell Zoo	
Texas	Smith	Tyler	3.2	5.1	Loop 323	Serves Tyler Pounds Regional Airport
Texas	Smith	Tyler	3.9	6.3	To Loop 323 south / Camp Ford Memorial Parkway – UT of Tyler	
Texas	Smith	Tyler	4.6	7.4	FM 2015 north	
Texas	Smith	Tyler	8.0	12.9	SH 155 north – Big Sandy	North end of SH 155 overlap
Texas	Smith		9.0	14.5	FM 3270	
Texas	Smith		10.3	16.6	FM 2908 south	
Texas	Smith		12.4	20.0	I-20 – Dallas, Longview	I-20 exit 571A
Texas	Smith		13.4	21.6	FM 757 – Starrville	
Texas	Smith		17.8	28.6	FM 16 west – Starrville, Winona	
Texas	Gregg	Gladewater	23.5	37.8	SH 135 south – Kilgore	
Texas	Gregg	Gladewater	24.6	39.6	Loop 485 north – truck route to US 80 / US 271	
Texas	Gregg	Gladewater	25.5	41.0	US 80 (Upshur Street) – Big Sandy, Longview	
Texas	Gregg	Gladewater	26.3	42.3	Loop 485 south – truck route to US 80 / US 271	
Texas	Gregg	Gladewater	26.7	43.0	FM 2275 east – Warren City	
Texas	Upshur		28.4	45.7	FM 1844 east – East Mountain	
Texas	Upshur	West Mountain	31.1	50.1	FM 726 east – Glenwood	
Texas	Upshur	Gilmer	38.4	61.8	SH 155 south – Big Sandy, Tyler	interchange; south end of SH 155 overlap
Texas	Upshur	Gilmer	38.9	62.6	SH 300 south – Longview	
Texas	Upshur	Gilmer	39.6	63.7	SH 154 (Marshall Street) – Gilmer Business District	
Texas	Upshur	Gilmer	40.0	64.4	SH 155 north – Linden	North end of SH 155 overlap
Texas	Upshur	Bettie	45.3	72.9	FM 2088 west – Simpsonville	
Texas	Upshur	Midway	48.6	78.2	FM 593 east – Ewell	
Texas	Camp		52.5	84.5	FM 1522 west – Pine	
Texas	Camp		52.6	84.7	FM 3384 north	
Texas	Camp		57.2	92.1	FM 3384 south	
Texas	Camp	Pittsburg	57.7	92.9	Loop 238 north (Rusk Street)	
Texas	Camp	Pittsburg	58.1	93.5	FM 993 (Lafayette Street)	
Texas	Camp	Pittsburg	58.3	93.8	FM 557 (Jefferson Street) – Lone Star	
Texas	Camp	Pittsburg	58.6	94.3	SH 11 (Daingerfield Street) – Daingerfield, Northeast Texas Community College	
Texas	Camp	Pittsburg	59.6	95.9	Loop 238 south (Mount Pleasant Street) – Business District	
Texas	Camp	Pittsburg	59.7	96.1	Loop 179 west (truck route) to SH 11 west – Lake Bob Sandlin State Park	
Texas	Camp		62.7	100.9	Loop 255	interchange
Texas	Titus	Mount Pleasant	65.7	105.7	FM 3417 west / Mike Hall Parkway – Mt. Pleasant Regional Airport	
Texas	Titus	Mount Pleasant	66.3	106.7	Bus. US 271 north – Mount Pleasant	interchange; south end of freeway; northbound exit and southbound entrance
Texas	Titus	Mount Pleasant	67.5	108.6	FM 4000 (Marvin Priefert Highway)	
Texas	Titus		68.9	110.9	FM 127 (Monticello Road)	
Texas	Titus		70.1	112.8	FM 899 (West 1st Street)	interchange; north end of freeway
Texas	Titus	Mount Pleasant	70.8	113.9	SH 49 east (West Ferguson Road)	
Texas	Titus	Mount Pleasant	70.9	114.1	US 67 (West 16th Street) – Winfield, Omaha	
Texas	Titus	Mount Pleasant	71.2	114.6	I-30 – Dallas, Texarkana	I-30 exit 160
Texas	Titus	Mount Pleasant	71.8	115.6	FM 1734	
Texas	Titus		74.4	119.7	Bus. US 271 south – Mount Pleasant	
Texas	Titus		82.4	132.6	FM 1896 south	
Texas	Titus	Talco	86.3	138.9	FM 71	
Texas	Titus	Talco	86.6	139.4	Loop 96 east (Broad Street)	
Texas	Franklin	No major junctions				
Texas	Red River	Bogata	96.3	155.0	Bus. US 271 north (South Main Street)	
Texas	Red River	Bogata	96.4	155.1	FM 909 north (Halesboro Street)	south end of FM 909 overlap
Texas	Red River	Bogata	96.5	155.3	FM 909 south (Halesboro Street)	north end of FM 909 overlap
Texas	Red River	Bogata	96.7	155.6	SH 37 – Mount Vernon, Clarksville	
Texas	Red River		97.5	156.9	Bus. US 271 south	
Texas	Red River	Rugby	99.8	160.6	FM 410 south – Cunningham	south end of FM 410 overlap
Texas	Red River	Rugby	99.9	160.8	FM 410 north – Detroit	north end of FM 410 overlap
Texas	Lamar	Deport	103.1	165.9	FM 1149 east (East Ruth Street)	
Texas	Lamar	Deport	103.3	166.2	Bus. US 271 north	
Texas	Lamar	Deport	103.9	167.2	FM 1503 south – Minter	
Texas	Lamar	Deport	104.0	167.4	Bus. US 271 south	
Texas	Lamar	Pattonville	109.1	175.6	FM 196 south – Cunningham	south end of FM 196 overlap
Texas	Lamar	Pattonville	109.2	175.7	FM 196 north	north end of FM 196 overlap
Texas	Lamar	Paris	115.4	185.7	FM 1508 north – Reno, Airport	
Texas	Lamar	Paris	117.0	188.3	Loop 286 south to SH 19 / SH 24 – Commerce	Interchange; south end of Loop 286 overlap
Texas	Lamar	Paris	117.2	188.6	Bus. US 271 north – Paris, Paris Junior College	Interchange
Texas	Lamar	Paris	118.0	189.9	US 82 east (US 82 Bus. west) – Clarksville	Interchange; south end of US 82 overlap
Texas	Lamar	Paris	118.5	190.7	Pine Mill Road	no direct northbound exit (signed at US 82 east)
Texas	Lamar	Paris	119.6	192.5	FM 195	Interchange
Texas	Lamar	Paris	120.2	193.4	Spur 139 east	
Texas	Lamar	Paris	120.7	194.2	Stillhouse Road	Interchange, access to Paris Regional Medical Center
Texas	Lamar	Paris	121.2	195.1	US 82 west / Loop 286 south / Bus. US 271 south to SH 19 / SH 24 – Bonham	Interchange; north end of US 82 / Loop 286 overlap
Texas	Lamar	Hinckley	125.0	201.2	FM 1499 west – Caviness, Lamar Point	
Texas	Lamar	Camp Maxey	128.3	206.5	FM 2648 east – Novice	
Texas	Lamar	Powderly	130.4	209.9	FM 3298 east	
Texas	Lamar	Midcity	132.4	213.1	FM 906 – Pat Mayse Lake, Chicota, Slate Shoals	
Texas	Lamar	Arthur City	134.5	216.5	FM 197 west – Chicota	
Texas	Lamar		134.8	216.9	Texas–Oklahoma line	
Oklahoma	Red River		0.00	0.00	Bridge	
Oklahoma	Choctaw		2.0	3.2	SH-109 east – Frogville, Shoals	South end of SH-109 overlap
Oklahoma	Choctaw		6.2	10.0	SH-109 west – Gay, Bluff	North end of SH-109 overlap
Oklahoma	Choctaw		8.3	13.4	SH-271A west – Goodland Academy	
Oklahoma	Choctaw		9.1	14.6	US 70 east / F Street north – Idabel, Hugo	Interchange; south end of US-70 overlap; former southern terminus of US-271 Bus; access to Choctaw Memorial Hospital
Oklahoma	Choctaw	Hugo	12.6	20.3	Indian Nation Turnpike north / Jackson Street east – Antlers, McAlester, Tulsa, Hugo, Idabel, Airport	Interchange; Indian Nation Tpk. exit 1; southern terminus of the Indian Nation Tpk.; former western terminus of US-70 Bus.; former northern terminus of US-271 Bus.
Oklahoma	Choctaw	Hugo	17.8	28.6	US 70 west – Durant, Soper	North end of US-70 overlap
Oklahoma	Pushmataha	Antlers	31.1	50.1	SH-3 west (Main Street) to Indian Nation Turnpike – Atoka, Ada	South end of SH-3 overlap
Oklahoma	Pushmataha	Antlers	31.9	51.3	SH-3 east (Main Street) – Broken Bow	North end of SH-3 overlap
Oklahoma	Pushmataha		59.3	95.4	SH-144 east – Nashoba	
Oklahoma	Pushmataha	Clayton	68.4	110.1	SH-2 south	South end of SH-2 overlap
Oklahoma	Pushmataha		71.5	115.1	SH-2 north – Wilburton	North end of SH-2 overlap
Oklahoma	Le Flore	Talihina	92.8	149.3	SH-63 east – Mena, AR	South end of SH-63 overlap
Oklahoma	Le Flore	Talihina	93.4	150.3	SH-1 west / SH-63 west (Dallas Street) – Hartshorne	North end of SH-63 overlap; south end of SH-1 overlap; Access to Choctaw Nation Healthcare Center
Oklahoma	Le Flore		101.5	163.3	SH-1 east (Talimena Scenic Drive) – Mena, AR	North end of SH-1 overlap
Oklahoma	Le Flore	Fanshawe	116.6	187.6	US 270 west – Wilburton	South end of US-270 overlap
Oklahoma	Le Flore	Wister	122.9	197.8	US 270 east – Wister Lake and Park	North end of US-270 overlap
Oklahoma	Le Flore	Poteau	129.2	207.9	US 59 Byp. north (Cavanal Expressway) / US 59 south – Heavener, Sallisaw, Fort Smith	Parclo interchange; south end of US-59 overlap; southern terminus of US-59 Byp; Access to Eastern Oklahoma Medical Center
Oklahoma	Le Flore	Poteau	134.0	215.7	US 59 Byp. south (Cavanal Expressway) / SH-112 north	Parclo interchange; northern terminus of US-59 Byp.; southern terminus of SH-112
Oklahoma	Le Flore	Panama	141.6	227.9	SH-31 west – Bokoshe	
Oklahoma	Le Flore		144.8	233.0	US 59 north / SH-9 west to I-40 – Sallisaw, Stigler	North end of US-59 overlap; south end of SH-9 overlap
Oklahoma	Le Flore		154.3	248.3	SH-9A east – Arkoma	
Oklahoma	Le Flore	Pocola	156.5	251.9	SH-112 south (Pocola Boulevard) – Poteau	South end of SH-112 overlap
Oklahoma	Le Flore	Pocola	158.2	254.6	SH-112 north – Arkoma	Interchange; north end of SH-112 overlap
			159.3 0.00	256.4 0.00	Oklahoma–Arkansas line SH-9 ends, I-540 begins	
Arkansas	Sebastian	Fort Smith	0.4	0.64	I-540 north / AR 253 south to I-40 – Hackett	I-540 exit 14; north end of I-540 overlap; northern terminus of AR 253
Arkansas	Sebastian	Fort Smith	3.2	5.1	US 71B / AR 255 (Zero Street) – Downtown Fort Smith, Port of Fort Smith	Northern terminus
1.000 mi = 1.609 km; 1.000 km = 0.621 mi: Concurrency terminus; Incomplete access; Route transition

== See also ==
=== Related routes ===
- U.S. Route 71
- U.S. Route 171
- U.S. Route 371

Browse numbered routes
← SH 261	TX	→ SH 273
← SH-270	OK	→ US 277
← US 270	AR	→ AR 272
