= Beasley Homestead =

Historic house in Arkansas, United States

- U.S. National Register of Historic Places
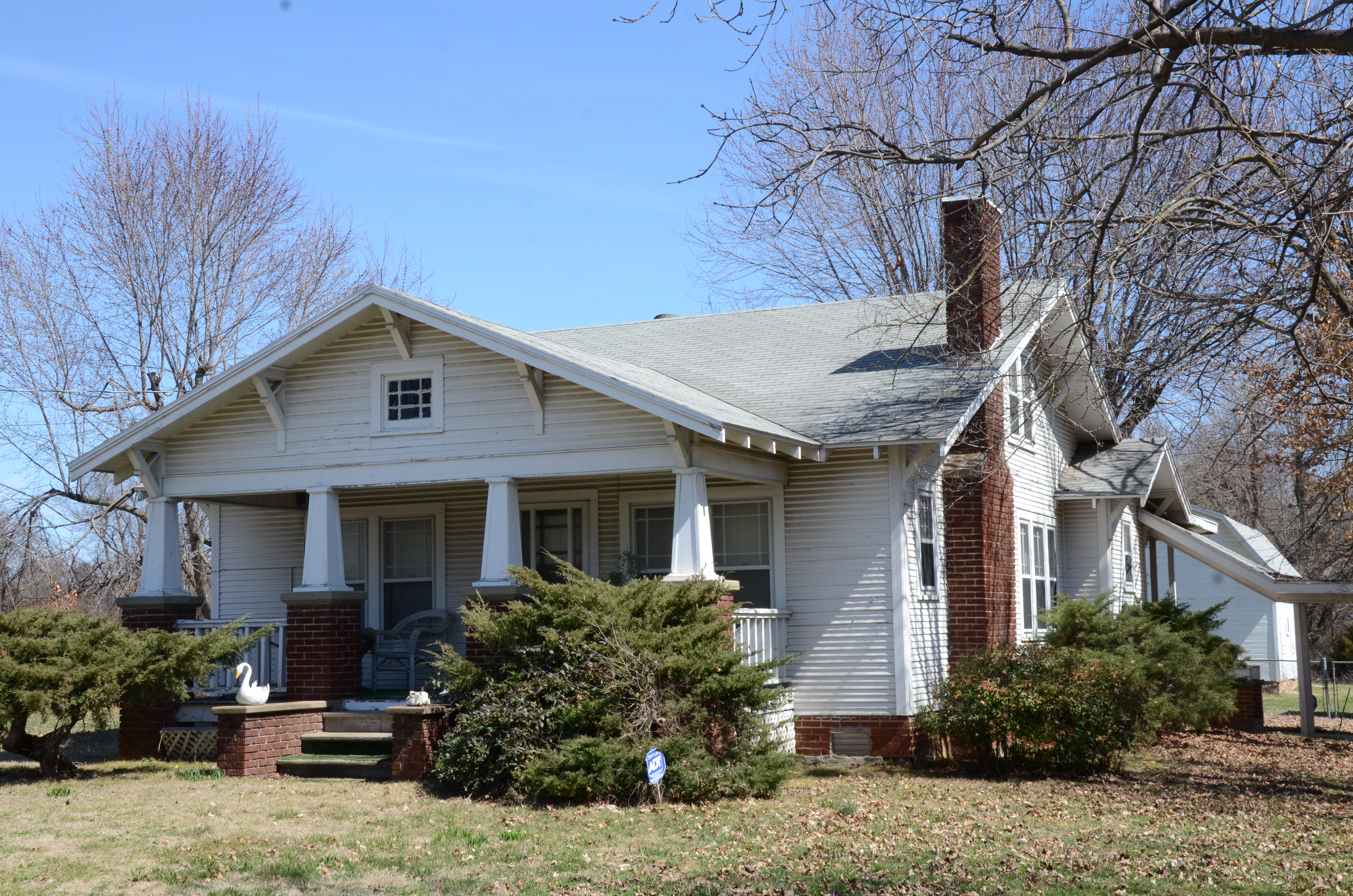

- Location within Arkansas Location within the United States
- Location: US 71B, Springdale, Arkansas
- Coordinates: 36°13′11″N 94°8′12″W
- Area: 1.5 acres (0.61 ha)
- Built: 1927
- Architectural style: Bungalow/craftsman
- MPS: Benton County MRA
- NRHP reference No.: 87002375
- Added to NRHP: January 28, 1988

The Beasley Homestead is a historic house and farmstead on US Highway 71 Business (US 71B) in Springdale, Arkansas. The main house, a Bungalow-style single-story structure built in 1927, is of a type common to Benton County in the 1920s. The outbuildings of the farmstead, including a barn, machine shed, and chicken house, were built at the same time and with similar detailing. The complex makes a rare complete and well-preserved farmstead from the period.

The house was listed on the National Register of Historic Places in 1988.

== See also ==
- National Register of Historic Places listings in Benton County, Arkansas
