= Delaware, Arkansas =

- Unincorporated community
- Location within Arkansas Location within the United States
- Coordinates: 35°17′01″N 93°17′56″W
- Country: United States
- State: Arkansas
- County: Logan
- Elevation: 361 ft (110 m)
- Time zone: UTC-6 (Central (CST))
  - Summer (DST): UTC-5 (CDT)
- ZIP code: 72835
- Area code: 479
- GNIS feature ID: 71363

Delaware is an unincorporated community in Logan County, Arkansas, United States. Delaware is located on Lake Dardanelle at the junction of Arkansas highways 22 and 393, 9 miles (14 km) northwest of Dardanelle. Delaware has a post office with ZIP code 72835.
