= Arkansas Highway 352 =

State highway in Arkansas, United States

Highway 352

Route information
- Maintained by ArDOT
- Existed: November 23, 1966–present

Section 1
- Length: 1.11 mi (1.79 km)
- West end: CR 441
- East end: US 64 in Clarksville

Section 2
- Length: 21.43 mi (34.49 km)
- West end: AR 23
- East end: US 64 in Clarksville

Location
- Country: United States
- State: Arkansas
- Counties: Franklin, Johnson

Highway system
- Arkansas Highway System; Interstate; US; State; Business; Spurs; Suffixed; Scenic; Heritage
← AR 351	→ AR 353

Highway 352 (AR 352, Ark. 352, and Hwy. 352) is a designation for two east–west state highways in the Arkansas River Valley. One section begins at Franklin County Road 441 (CR 441) and runs north 1.11 miles (1.79 km) to US Highway 64 (US 64). A second segment begins at Highway 23 approximately 5 miles (8.0 km) north of Ozark. Its eastern terminus is U.S. Highway 64 in Clarksville.

== Route description ==
=== Western Franklin County ===
The highway begins at Franklin CR 441 and runs due north as a section line road to US 64 in western Franklin County.

=== White Oak to Clarksville ===
The route begins at Highway 23 north of Ozark in the Arkansas River Valley. The route is a two-lane rural highway its complete length, paralleling Interstate 40 (I-40) and bridging it twice, though no direct access to I-40 is provided.

Highway 352 begins at AR 23 and runs east to meet AR 219 in Mountain Grove. It continues east, meeting AR 164 in Hunt before angling south to cross over I-40. The route runs south of I-40 until it again crosses over the road, after which it terminates at US 64 in Clarksville.

== History ==
Two sections of Highway 352 were created by the Arkansas State Highway Commission on November 23, 1966; one between Highway 23 and Highway 219 in Franklin County and one from US 64 near Clarksville west to a county road at Borden's Corner. In 1973, the Arkansas General Assembly passed Act 9 of 1973. The act directed county judges and legislators to designate up to 12 miles (19 km) of county roads as state highways in each county. As a result of this legislation, a third segment of Highway 352 was designated on April 25, 1973 (running south from US 64), and the segment in Johnson County was extended west to the Franklin County line on May 23, 1973. The gap between the two longer routes was closed on October 31, 1973, but this gap closure was initially part of an extended Highway 186. The Highway 186 segment between the two Highway 352 sections was renumbered to provide route continuity on August 25, 1976.

== Major intersections ==
County	Location	mi	km	Destinations	Notes
Franklin		0.00	0.00	CR 441, End state maintenance	Western terminus
Franklin		1.11	1.79	US 64 – Ozark, Alma	Eastern terminus
Franklin	Gap in route				
Franklin	White Oak	0.00	0.00	AR 23 – Huntsville, Ozark	Western terminus
Franklin	Mountain Grove	3.19	5.13	AR 219 – Ozark	
Johnson		5.76– 5.96	9.27– 9.59	AR 164	officially designated exception
Johnson	Clarksville	21.43	34.49	US 64 (Main Street)	Eastern terminus
1.000 mi = 1.609 km; 1.000 km = 0.621 mi: Concurrency terminus
