= Springdale Poultry Industry Historic District =

Historic district in Arkansas, United States

- U.S. National Register of Historic Places
- U.S. Historic district
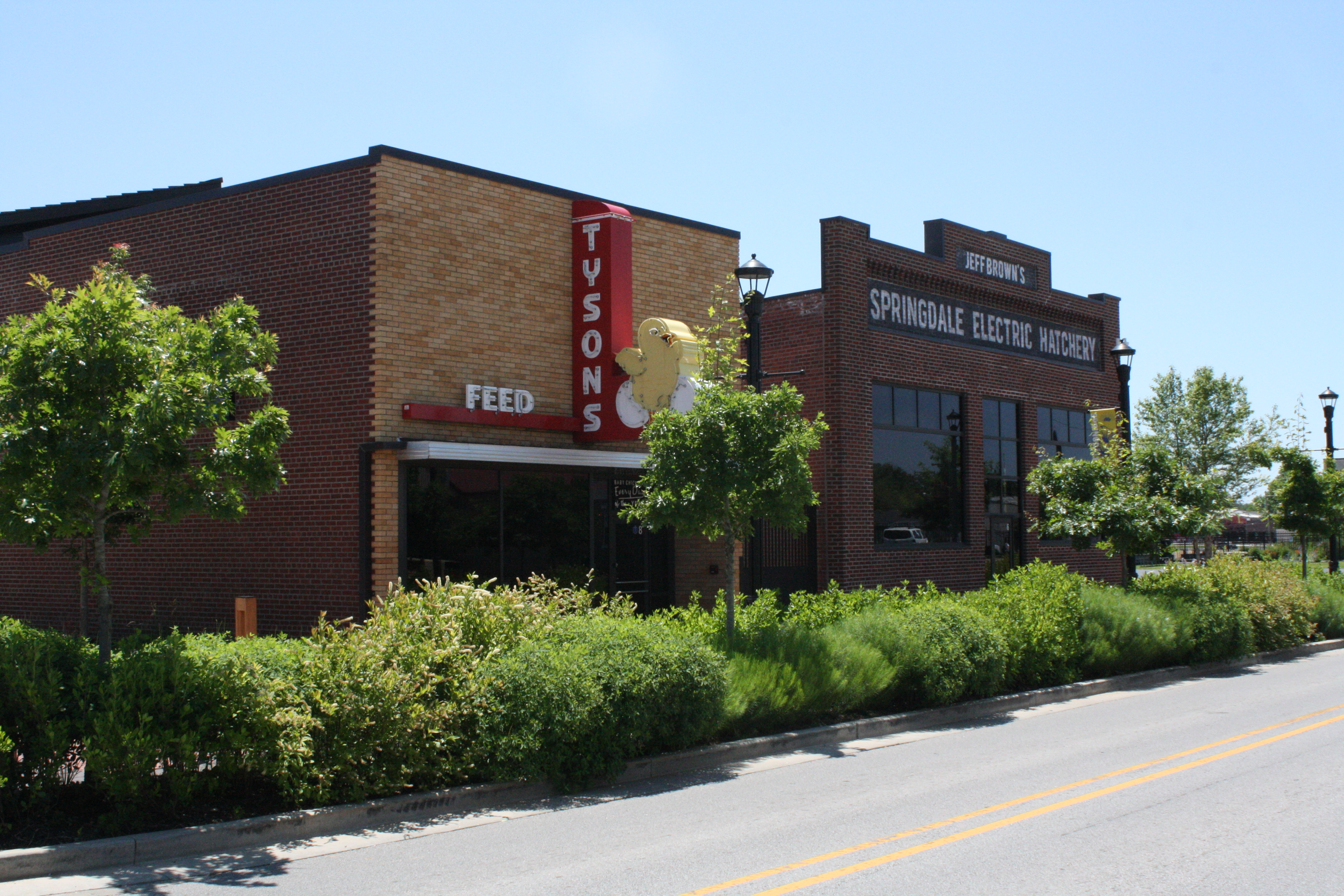
- Location: Emma Avenue, Springdale, Arkansas
- Area: Less than one acre
- NRHP reference No.: 11000695
- Added to NRHP: September 23, 2011

The Springdale Poultry Industry Historic District encompasses a small complex of commercial industrial buildings associated with the poultry industry in Springdale, Arkansas. Its three buildings included the original headquarters building of Tyson Foods, one of the world's largest producers of chicken meat. That building, at 319 East Emma Avenue, was built between 1914 and 1924 to house a produce store, and was extensively altered in 1947 to house the Tyson offices. Immediately adjacent at 317 East Emma is a chicken hatchery, built in 1924 by the Springdale Electric Hatchery Company and renamed the Jeff Brown Hatchery in 1949. The Tyson Feed Mill building stands behind these at 316 East Meadow. Jeff Brown was the first president of the Arkansas Poultry Improvement Association.

The district was listed on the National Register of Historic Places in 2011.

== See also ==
- National Register of Historic Places listings in Washington County, Arkansas
