= Kibler, Arkansas =

- City
- Location of Kibler in Crawford County, Arkansas.
- Coordinates: 35°25′31″N 94°14′11″W
- Country: United States
- State: Arkansas
- County: Crawford

Area
  - Total: 5.00 sq mi (12.96 km^{2})
  - Land: 5.00 sq mi (12.94 km^{2})
  - Water: 0.0077 sq mi (0.02 km^{2})
- Elevation: 456 ft (139 m)

Population (2020)
  - Total: 1,005
  - Estimate (2025): 1,029 ▲
  - Density: 201.2/sq mi (77.67/km^{2})
- Time zone: UTC-6 (Central (CST))
  - Summer (DST): UTC-5 (CDT)
- FIPS code: 05-36670
- GNIS feature ID: 2404829

Kibler is a city in Crawford County, Arkansas, United States. It is part of the Fort Smith, Arkansas-Oklahoma Metropolitan Statistical Area. As of the 2020 census, Kibler had a population of 1,005.

== Geography ==
Kibler is located in southern Crawford County 4 miles (6 km) south of Alma and 6 miles (10 km) east of Van Buren.

According to the United States Census Bureau, Kibler has a total area of 4.5 square miles (11.6 km^{2}), all land.

== Demographics ==
Historical population
Census	Pop.	Note	%±
1970	611		—
1980	798		30.6%
1990	931		16.7%
2000	969		4.1%
2010	961		−0.8%
2020	1,005		4.6%
2025 (est.)	1,029	▲	2.4%
U.S. Decennial Census

=== 2020 census ===
As of the 2020 census, Kibler had a population of 1,005. The median age was 44.0 years. 21.4% of residents were under the age of 18 and 21.3% of residents were 65 years of age or older. For every 100 females there were 99.4 males, and for every 100 females age 18 and over there were 98.0 males age 18 and over.

0.0% of residents lived in urban areas, while 100.0% lived in rural areas.

There were 386 households in Kibler, of which 32.9% had children under the age of 18 living in them. Of all households, 54.1% were married-couple households, 16.1% were households with a male householder and no spouse or partner present, and 22.8% were households with a female householder and no spouse or partner present. About 23.8% of all households were made up of individuals and 11.4% had someone living alone who was 65 years of age or older.

There were 417 housing units, of which 7.4% were vacant. The homeowner vacancy rate was 0.6% and the rental vacancy rate was 0.0%.

Racial composition as of the 2020 census
Race	Number	Percent
White	815	81.1%
Black or African American	1	0.1%
American Indian and Alaska Native	30	3.0%
Asian	16	1.6%
Native Hawaiian and Other Pacific Islander	0	0.0%
Some other race	30	3.0%
Two or more races	113	11.2%
Hispanic or Latino (of any race)	52	5.2%

=== 2000 census ===
As of the census of 2000, there were 969 people, 343 households, and 278 families residing in the city. The population density was 214.6 inhabitants per square mile (82.9/km^{2}). There were 368 housing units at an average density of 81.5 per square mile (31.5/km^{2}). The racial makeup of the city was 95.25% White, 0.10% Black or African American, 1.44% Native American, 1.86% Asian, 0.62% from other races, and 0.72% from two or more races. 1.44% of the population were Hispanic or Latino of any race.

There were 343 households, out of which 35.9% had children under the age of 18 living with them, 65.9% were married couples living together, 11.4% had a female householder with no husband present, and 18.7% were non-families. 16.9% of all households were made up of individuals, and 7.6% had someone living alone who was 65 years of age or older. The average household size was 2.83 and the average family size was 3.16.

In the city, the population was spread out, with 27.7% under the age of 18, 9.5% from 18 to 24, 26.6% from 25 to 44, 25.3% from 45 to 64, and 10.9% who were 65 years of age or older. The median age was 37 years. For every 100 females, there were 99.4 males. For every 100 females age 18 and over, there were 98.6 males.

The median income for a household in the city was $33,889, and the median income for a family was $36,761. Males had a median income of $27,955 versus $19,583 for females. The per capita income for the city was $15,763. About 11.3% of families and 14.8% of the population were below the poverty line, including 22.4% of those under age 18 and 21.9% of those age 65 or over.
