= Central City, Arkansas =

- City
- Location of Central City in Sebastian County, Arkansas.
- Coordinates: 35°19′28″N 94°14′45″W
- Country: United States
- State: Arkansas
- County: Sebastian

Area
  - Total: 2.29 sq mi (5.92 km^{2})
  - Land: 2.22 sq mi (5.76 km^{2})
  - Water: 0.062 sq mi (0.16 km^{2})
- Elevation: 420 ft (130 m)

Population (2020)
  - Total: 461
  - Estimate (2025): 469 ▲
  - Density: 207.3/sq mi (80.03/km^{2})
- Time zone: UTC-6 (Central (CST))
  - Summer (DST): UTC-5 (CDT)
- ZIP code: 72941
- Area code: 479
- FIPS code: 05-13120
- GNIS feature ID: 2406247

Central City is a city in Sebastian County, Arkansas, United States. It is part of the Fort Smith, Arkansas-Oklahoma Metropolitan Statistical Area. At the 2020 Census, the population of Central City was 461.

== Geography ==
According to the United States Census Bureau, the town has a total area of 5.6 km^{2} (2.2 sq mi), all land.

== Demographics ==
Historical population
Census	Pop.	Note	%±
1980	339		—
1990	419		23.6%
2000	531		26.7%
2010	502		−5.5%
2020	461		−8.2%
2025 (est.)	469	▲	1.7%
U.S. Decennial Census; 2018 Estimate

As of the census of 2000, there were 531 people, 216 households, and 166 families residing in the town. The population density was 94.5/km^{2} (245/mi^{2}). There were 227 housing units at an average density of 40.4 units /km^{2} (105 units/mi^{2}). The racial makeup of the town was 96.23% White, 1.51% Black or African American, 0.94% from other races, and 1.32% from two or more races. 1.69% of the population were Hispanic or Latino of any race.

There were 216 households, out of which 26.4% had children under the age of 18 living with them, 66.2% were married couples living together, 8.8% had a female householder with no husband present, and 23.1% were non-families. 21.8% of all households were made up of individuals, and 7.4% had someone living alone who was 65 years of age or older. The average household size was 2.42 and the average family size was 2.81.

In the town, the population was spread out, with 20.3% under the age of 18, 7.2% from 18 to 24, 27.3% from 25 to 44, 31.3% from 45 to 64, and 13.9% who were 65 years of age or older. The median age was 41 years. For every 100 females, there were 93.8 males. For every 100 females age 18 and over, there were 91.4 males.

The median income for a household in the town was $38,173, and the median income for a family was $43,958. Males had a median income of $31,964 versus $20,875 for females. The per capita income for the town was $15,892. About 7.8% of families and 15.8% of the population were below the poverty line, including 20.3% of those under age 18 and 7.9% of those age 65 or over.

== Education ==
Lavaca School District is an accredited public school district that encompasses 58.77 square miles (152.2 km^{2}) of land including Lavaca and Central City, and provides early childhood, elementary and secondary education to students leading to graduation from Lavaca High School.
