= Barling, Arkansas =

- City
- Location of Barling in Sebastian County, Arkansas.
- Coordinates: 35°20′05″N 94°15′45″W
- Country: United States
- State: Arkansas
- County: Sebastian
- Established: June 8, 1956

Government
  - Type: City administrator
  - Mayor: Greg Murray

Area
  - Total: 10.68 sq mi (27.67 km^{2})
  - Land: 10.27 sq mi (26.60 km^{2})
  - Water: 0.41 sq mi (1.07 km^{2})
- Elevation: 407 ft (124 m)

Population (2020)
  - Total: 4,782
  - Estimate (2025): 5,452 ▲
  - Density: 465.7/sq mi (179.79/km^{2})
- Time zone: UTC-6 (Central (CST))
  - Summer (DST): UTC-5 (CDT)
- ZIP code: 72923
- Area code: 479
- FIPS code: 05-03640
- GNIS feature ID: 2403158
- Website: www.barlingar.gov

Barling is a city in Sebastian County, Arkansas, United States. It is part of the Fort Smith, Arkansas-Oklahoma Metropolitan Statistical Area. As of the 2020 Census the population was 4,782, ranking it eighth in the Greater Fort Smith Area. Barling was incorporated in 1956.

== Geography ==
Barling was named after Aaron Barling, a soldier originally posted to Fort Gibson in Indian Territory who subsequently farmed in Arkansas.

According to the United States Census Bureau, the city has a total area of 22.1 square miles (57 km^{2}), of which 21.9 square miles (57 km^{2}) is land and 0.1 square miles (0.26 km^{2}) (0.59%) is water.

=== Climate ===
The climate in this area is characterized by hot, humid summers and generally mild to cool winters. According to the Köppen Climate Classification system, Barling has a humid subtropical climate, abbreviated "Cfa" on climate maps.

== Demographics ==
Historical population
Census	Pop.	Note	%±
1960	770		—
1970	1,739		125.8%
1980	3,761		116.3%
1990	4,078		8.4%
2000	4,176		2.4%
2010	4,649		11.3%
2020	4,782		2.9%
2025 (est.)	5,452	▲	14.0%
U.S. Decennial Census; 2014 Estimate

=== 2020 census ===
Barling racial composition
Race	Number	Percentage
White (non-Hispanic)	3,417	71.46%
Black or African American (non-Hispanic)	108	2.26%
Native American	90	1.88%
Asian	213	4.45%
Pacific Islander	4	0.08%
Other/Mixed	419	8.76%
Hispanic or Latino	531	11.1%

As of the 2020 census, there were 4,782 people, 1,791 households, and 1,227 families residing in the city.

The median age was 38.6 years. 23.1% of residents were under the age of 18 and 19.0% of residents were 65 years of age or older. For every 100 females there were 91.8 males, and for every 100 females age 18 and over there were 87.7 males age 18 and over.

99.7% of residents lived in urban areas, while 0.3% lived in rural areas.

Of households in Barling, 31.1% had children under the age of 18 living in them. Of all households, 43.2% were married-couple households, 18.7% were households with a male householder and no spouse or partner present, and 30.8% were households with a female householder and no spouse or partner present. About 31.8% of all households were made up of individuals and 15.7% had someone living alone who was 65 years of age or older.

There were 2,113 housing units, of which 8.5% were vacant. The homeowner vacancy rate was 1.6% and the rental vacancy rate was 10.2%.

=== 2000 census ===
As of the census of 2000, there were 4,176 people, 1,599 households, and 1,122 families residing in the city. The population density was 190.4 inhabitants per square mile (73.5/km^{2}). There were 1,697 housing units at an average density of 77.4 per square mile (29.9/km^{2}). The racial makeup of the city was 87.05% White, 1.39% Black or African American, 1.87% Native American, 5.10% Asian, 0.02% Pacific Islander, 2.04% from other races, and 2.54% from two or more races. 3.98% of the population were Hispanic or Latino of any race.

There were 1,599 households, out of which 35.2% had children under the age of 18 living with them, 53.3% were married couples living together, 12.6% had a female householder with no husband present, and 29.8% were non-families. 26.5% of all households were made up of individuals, and 10.3% had someone living alone who was 65 years of age or older. The average household size was 2.54 and the average family size was 3.07.

In the city, the population was spread out, with 26.5% under the age of 18, 8.7% from 18 to 24, 30.3% from 25 to 44, 21.8% from 45 to 64, and 12.7% who were 65 years of age or older. The median age was 36 years. For every 100 females, there were 86.9 males. For every 100 females age 18 and over, there were 85.9 males.

The median income for a household in the city was $37,605, and the median income for a family was $41,421. Males had a median income of $28,218 versus $22,936 for females. The per capita income for the city was $16,485. About 10.0% of families and 11.9% of the population were below the poverty line, including 15.8% of those under age 18 and 14.3% of those age 65 or over.

== Education ==
The following school districts include portions of Barling:

- Fort Smith School District
- Greenwood School District
- Lavaca School District - operates Lavaca High School

== Notable person ==
- Hal Smith, Major League Baseball player
