= Lavaca, Arkansas =

- City
- Location of Lavaca in Sebastian County, Arkansas
- Coordinates: 35°20′03″N 94°10′48″W
- Country: United States
- State: Arkansas
- County: Sebastian

Area
  - Total: 2.23 sq mi (5.78 km^{2})
  - Land: 2.22 sq mi (5.75 km^{2})
  - Water: 0.0077 sq mi (0.02 km^{2})
- Elevation: 423 ft (129 m)

Population (2020)
  - Total: 2,450
  - Estimate (2025): 2,528 ▲
  - Density: 1,102.8/sq mi (425.78/km^{2})
- Time zone: UTC-6 (Central (CST))
  - Summer (DST): UTC-5 (CDT)
- ZIP code: 72941
- Area code: 479
- FIPS code: 05-38890
- GNIS feature ID: 2404893
- Website: cityoflavaca.com

Lavaca (/ləˈvɑːkə/ lə-VAH-kə) is a city in Sebastian County, Arkansas, United States. It is part of the Fort Smith, Arkansas-Oklahoma Metropolitan Statistical Area. As of the 2020 Census the population was 2,450. Lavaca was incorporated in 1919.

== Geography ==
According to the United States Census Bureau, the city has a total area of 2.2 square miles (5.7 km^{2}), all land.

== Demographics ==
Historical population
Census	Pop.	Note	%±
1930	319		—
1940	340		6.6%
1950	373		9.7%
1960	392		5.1%
1970	532		35.7%
1980	1,092		105.3%
1990	1,253		14.7%
2000	1,825		45.7%
2010	2,289		25.4%
2020	2,450		7.0%
2025 (est.)	2,528	▲	3.2%
U.S. Decennial Census

=== 2020 census ===
As of the 2020 census, there were 2,450 people, 922 households, and 693 families residing in the city. The median age was 35.0 years. 28.0% of residents were under the age of 18 and 12.8% were 65 years of age or older. For every 100 females there were 93.1 males, and for every 100 females age 18 and over there were 90.1 males age 18 and over.

0.0% of residents lived in urban areas, while 100.0% lived in rural areas.

Of the city's households, 39.0% had children under the age of 18 living in them. 56.2% were married-couple households, 14.5% were households with a male householder and no spouse or partner present, and 23.5% were households with a female householder and no spouse or partner present. About 20.9% of all households were made up of individuals, and 9.5% had someone living alone who was 65 years of age or older.

There were 996 housing units, of which 7.4% were vacant. The homeowner vacancy rate was 2.5% and the rental vacancy rate was 11.2%.

Lavaca racial composition
Race	Number	Percentage
White (non-Hispanic)	2,023	82.57%
Black or African American (non-Hispanic)	7	0.29%
Native American	56	2.29%
Asian	7	0.29%
Pacific Islander	4	0.16%
Other/Mixed	219	8.94%
Hispanic or Latino	134	5.47%

=== 2000 census ===
As of the census of 2000, there were 1,825 people, 674 households, and 529 families residing in the city. The population density was 849.9 inhabitants per square mile (328.1/km^{2}). There were 718 housing units at an average density of 334.4 per square mile (129.1/km^{2}). The racial makeup of the city was 95.12% White, 0.16% Black or African American, 1.26% Native American, 1.21% from other races, and 2.25% from two or more races. 2.14% of the population were Hispanic or Latino of any race.

There were 674 households, out of which 41.5% had children under the age of 18 living with them, 65.6% were married couples living together, 9.8% had a female householder with no husband present, and 21.5% were non-families. 18.7% of all households were made up of individuals, and 6.1% had someone living alone who was 65 years of age or older. The average household size was 2.71 and the average family size was 3.09.

In the city, the population was spread out, with 28.9% under the age of 18, 9.2% from 18 to 24, 34.6% from 25 to 44, 18.6% from 45 to 64, and 8.8% who were 65 years of age or older. The median age was 33 years. For every 100 females, there were 92.9 males. For every 100 females age 18 and over, there were 87.3 males.

The median income for a household in the city was $39,427, and the median income for a family was $43,542. Males had a median income of $28,684 versus $22,500 for females. The per capita income for the city was $15,917. About 7.5% of families and 8.5% of the population were below the poverty line, including 11.2% of those under age 18 and 10.3% of those age 65 or over.

== Education ==
=== Elementary and secondary education ===
Public education for early childhood, elementary and secondary school students is provided primarily by the Lavaca School District, which leads to graduation from Lavaca High School. Lavaca High School was nationally recognized as a Bronze Medalist in the Best High Schools Report 2012 developed by U.S. News & World Report.

The district has undertaken construction projects to build a new school facilities for the high, middle and elementary schools. In 2010, the Lavaca Performing Arts Center was completed on the campus of Lavaca High School and is available to the city for community events.

=== Public libraries ===
The Scott Sebastian Regional Library system based in Greenwood maintains the Lavaca Branch Library that contains books, magazines, newspapers and multimedia.
