= 1915–1917 Wheelbarrow Mine strike =

Labor dispute in Johnson County, Arkansas

- Date: June 9, 1915 – November 1917
- Location: Johnson County, Arkansas, United States
- Caused by: Changes in the method used to determine miners' pay per the amount of coal mined
- Methods: Strike action; Walkout
- Result: Company declares bankruptcy, new company agrees to recognize union and ends strike

Parties
United Mine Workers	Pennsylvania Mining Company

In 1915, coal miners affiliated with the United Mine Workers (UMW) labor union at the Wheelbarrow Mine in Johnson County, Arkansas, went on strike against the mine's operators, the Pennsylvania Mining Company (PMC). The strike ended in 1917 after the PMC declared bankruptcy and a new company, the Fernwood Mining Company, was established to operate the mine and quickly agreed to recognize the UMW.

The prelude to strike action at the Wheelbarrow Mine began in 1910 when the existing contract between the UMW and the Anthracite Coal and Land Company, which owned and, at the time, operated the mine, expired without a replacement contract. In October of that year, PMC was established and began operating the mine under a lease from the Anthracite Coal Company. This new company refused to negotiate with the UMW and began to bring in immigrant workers from Pennsylvania to work at the mine, leading to tension and some sporadic instances of violence between these replacement workers and former UMW miners. For the next several years, the UMW attempted to organize workers at the mine and planned for a strike against PMC, and on June 9, 1915, several miners performed a walkout following a change in company policy regarding how miners were compensated for the amount of coal they mined, resulting in a strike.

Following this walkout, UMW officials quickly organized a new local union in Johnson County and made plans for carrying out the strike. Over the next several months, there were several instances of violence between pro- and anti-union sides, and on August 24, a trestle bridge in the county was partially destroyed in an act of sabotage. Following this, UMW official James Moran negotiated with the company a potential end to the strike by the end of the year, but unbeknownst to the union, PMC had by this time initiated legal actions against the union. However, within about one year of filing this lawsuit, PMC declared bankruptcy, in part due to costs associated with the strike and subsequent litigation. PMC ultimately lost the right to operate the Wheelbarrow Mine, and their successor company, the Fernwood Mining Company, quickly recognized the UMW as a collective bargaining organization and negotiated an end to the strike in November 1917.

In the ensuing years, PMC and the UMW continued litigating in various courts, with the company alleging that the union had engaged in conspiracy regarding interstate commerce that violated the terms of the Sherman Antitrust Act. However, the union rejected these accusations and, in a final hearing in September 1928, the United States Court of Appeals for the Eighth Circuit sided with the union and rejected the company's case, awarding the UMW court costs. While the union ultimately succeeded in both their strike and subsequent legal battles, the coal industry in Arkansas had by this point entered into a state of decline that hurt unions such as the UMW's influence in the state.

== Background ==
=== Coal in Arkansas ===
In 1840, coal was discovered in the town of Spadra, in Johnson County, Arkansas, with coal mining operations beginning that same year. Initially, mining was primarily for local use in blacksmithing, but the construction of the Little Rock and Fort Smith Railroad in the 1870s opened the region up for more commercial mining activity, primarily in the counties of Franklin, Johnson, and Sebastian. The coal in this area, a region in the Arkansas River Valley stretching roughly from the city of Russellville to the Oklahoma state border, is mostly bituminous coal, though anthracite is also present in an area known as the Spadra field. By the early 1900s, Arkansas boasted the only anthracite mining operations in the United States between Colorado and Pennsylvania, and in Johnson County, the anthracite vein measured more than 3 feet (0.91 m) in width in some areas and was situated approximately 500 feet (150 m) beneath the ground.

=== Labor in the coal mines ===
After the American Civil War, mine operators in the region relied on convict leasing, though this system fell out of use by the late 1800s following an 1888 investigation by the state government that revealed numerous instances of workers' abuse and death in the mines. Following this, the miners in the region were primarily agricultural workers who engaged in mine working on a part-time basis, and the mines attracted workers from nearby cities such as Jamestown and Clarksville, the county seat of Johnson County. By the late 1800s, mine workers began to organize and conduct strike actions against mine operators, with two of the three strikes reported by the state of Arkansas to the United States Commissioner of Labor between 1881 and 1886 occurring in the coal mines of Spadra. By the 1890s, miners in Arkansas began to join national labor unions, such as the Knights of Labor, and in 1894, roughly 1,400 miners in the state participated in a general strike that had been called by the United Mine Workers (UMW).

The UMW had been formed in 1890 and within a few years of its formation had been successful at agitating for increased wages and better working conditions for miners in states such as Indiana, Ohio, and Pennsylvania, and in 1898, the union began to focus its efforts on organizing miners in Arkansas. In 1899, the union called for its first strike in Arkansas, which fell under the union's District 21, a regional division that also represented workers in Oklahoma and Texas. By 1903, the UMW had achieved union recognition in western Arkansas and began to engage with local mine operators in collective bargaining, and by the end of the decade, almost all miners in the region were members of UMW District 21 and organized into local unions. In 1910, UMW District 21 boasted a membership of roughly 35,000 members, with the workers in Johnson County organized under Local 2773.

=== Wheelbarrow Mine ===
In the early 1900s, the Wheelbarrow Mine in Johnson County (Note: Sources vary on the exact location of the mine in Johnson County. Historian Suzanne S. Lewis, writing in a 1984 article for The Arkansas Historical Quarterly, stated that the strike occurred "at Jamestown", while a 2010 article in the regional online magazine ABOUT the River Valley states that the strike occurred at Coal Hill.) was an anthracite mine owned by the Arkansas-based Anthracite Coal and Land Company, which, as a member of the Southwestern Coal Operators Association (the regional employers' organization), operated the mine under an industry-wide agreement with the UMW. In 1910, the existing contract between the UMW and the Anthracite Coal company was set to expire, but a strike that year affected negotiations on a replacement contract, and as a result, when the contract expired on April 1, the company decided to continue to operate under the terms of the now-expired contract. In October 1910, James Gearhart, a businessman from Scranton, Pennsylvania, who was an officer at the Anthracite Coal company, established the Pennsylvania Mining Company (PMC) to operate the Wheelbarrow Mine. This new company, which was a subsidiary of Anthracite Coal, gained the mining rights for the Wheelbarrow Mine for roughly $484,000 and reneged on the existing deal with the union, operating the mine without a union contract. This decision angered many longtime miners, prompting many of them to seek employment either in other nearby mines or in agriculture. In the ensuing years, local union membership declined from about 100 in 1910 to 13 in 1913, at which time no union member who had worked at the company during its time operated by the Anthracite Coal company worked at the now-PMC operated mine. Within the community, many locals viewed people who continued to work at the Wheelbarrow Mine as scabs.

=== Immigrant workers brought in from Pennsylvania ===
Given the resignation of many UMW miners, starting in late 1910, PMC began to replace local miners with a primarily immigrant and non-union labor force. Many of these workers were immigrants from Eastern Europe, such as Austria, Hungary, Poland, and Russia, who had been living in Pennsylvania and were brought in by PMC from Scranton to Clarksville via rail transport and then via horse and buggy from Clarksville to the mine. This occurred during a larger trend of eastern European immigrants, including many Slavic people, being recruited by mine operators in western Arkansas, and in total, between 1910 and 1915, a total of roughly 1,500 immigrant workers were active at various points in the Wheelbarrow Mine under PMC operation.

For the length of the labor dispute at the Wheelbarrow Mine, the immigrant workers were, in the words of historian Suzanne S. Lewis, "pawns in a vicious chess game played out between union and management". National UMW official Thomas King stated that these immigrants were brought to Arkansas from Pennsylvania under false pretenses, alleging that the company had promised the immigrants work in a union mine. On the other side, the union encouraged many immigrants to seek employment in other mines, and the UMW spent approximately $10,000 over the course of the labor dispute on this program. According to one union organizer in Johnson County, many of the immigrants were eager to seek employment elsewhere due to the poor working conditions at the Wheelbarrow Mine. On the other hand, the Encyclopedia of Arkansas notes that some union members took advantage of the immigrants' poor grasp of English to trick them into moving to other states for work, and there were some instances of immigrant workers facing threats of physical violence from pro-union individuals.

=== Increased violence in Johnson County ===
As the labor dispute continued, a sense of lawlessness and increasing tension grew in both the nearby towns and the tent camp that housed the immigrant laborers, and while the PMC was initially unconcerned, the company eventually hired armed guards and instituted changes in company policy. These guards primarily kept the workers from leaving the tent camp and prevented locals, including union organizers, from entering the camp, thus damaging unionization efforts among the workers. There were numerous instances, especially in 1911 and 1912, of confrontations between company guards and union activists, and in at least one instance, a company guard worked covertly as a spy for the UMW. By the later half of 1913, the UMW decided to increase their efforts in Johnson County, and in November of that year, during a political rally outside of the courthouse in Clarksville, a union activist called the manager of PMC a "slave driver" and urged the townspeople present "to take shotguns and go down and get them". In July 1914, there was a violent confrontation between pro- and anti-union activists at the Prairie Creek Mine in Sebastian County, roughly 80 miles (130 km) from the Wheelbarrow Mine, prompting PMC to increase security while the UMW began to recruit more active miners in the Wheelbarrow Mine. According to a 2021 article in the Southwest Times Record, 1914 represented a general peak in labor disputes in the coal fields of Arkansas, with the year experiencing several instances of riots and violence in the area.

=== Prelude to strike action ===
In March 1915, the state legislature passed Act 49, amending a law concerning how coal was measured in non-union mines. The act, which repealed the ban on using screens on scales that measured the amount of coal miners had mined, had the effect of negatively impacting miners' pay, as they stood to receive less money based on the measurement method employed by the company. Around this same time, union officials met with several spies in the mine who stated that many miners in the camp were agitated and prepared for a strike action, although the union leaders insisted that a strike should be held later on in the year, in winter, when the increased demand in coal for heating would give the miners more leverage against the company. Despite these plans, on June 7, three miners, acting independent of the UMW, met with the mine superintendent and requested that the company negotiate directly with the miners over certain policies, such as the company's decision to install screens on the weight scales. The superintendent stated that he could not do anything about the miners' demands until the mine's manager, Fremont Stokes, returned from Pennsylvania in the next several days. While the miners returned to work on the following day, on June 9, many miners refused to report for work, thus beginning a strike that had been developing in a labor dispute stretching back five years.

== Course of the strike ==
The strike commenced on June 9, with a walkout of several workers from the mine. Later that night, national officers from the UMW, including Pete Hanraty, (Note: Spelled "Hanratty" in multiple sources.) met with the striking miners and helped establish a new local union for them, oversaw elections for local officer positions, delegated various responsibilities for strike activities, and articulated the miners' list of demands for PMC. Chief among the strikers' demands were union recognition, while other demands grew over the course of the strike to include better working conditions and better pay. However, the company resisted recognizing the union and began to evict striking workers from their company-owned homes, with the union establishing a temporary tent camp for the strikers near the mining camp in Jamestown. The tents were purchased by the union at a cost of $165, while the union also rented the land the camp was located on and assisted strikers with paying for food from the mine's company store.

Following this initial walkout, violence associated with the strike became a common occurrence, and rumors spread throughout both the strikers' camp and the active miners' camp about purported acts or threats of violence from the other side. Indicative of this, during the course of the strike, the United States Marshals Service became involved, and on August 24, this violence reached a peak when a trestle bridge in the county was severely damaged in an act of vandalism that heightened tensions between the two sides, especially since the perpetrator was never found. Following the bridge debacle, a union organizer from the Chicago area, James Moran, began to directly negotiate with Gearhart concerning a possible resolution to the strike action. On behalf of the UMW, Moran agreed to disband the tent camp and call off the strike if PMC would rehire the strikers. While reports from Moran in November indicated that the developments were promising, on December 14, Gearhart sent a letter to Moran expressing disappointment with the union and stating that the tent camp was still in place, despite Moran's assurances. At the time that Gearhart had sent this letter, and unbeknownst to Moran or the union, PMC was in the process of initiating a lawsuit against the UMW, arguing that the union had violated terms of the Sherman Antitrust Act.

Roughly one year after PMC filed their lawsuit against the union, the company filed for bankruptcy, due in part to the costs associated with the strike and subsequent lawsuit. PMC's rights to operate the Wheelbarrow Mine were rescinded after the company failed to pay the Anthracite Coal Company their royalties, and within several months, a new company, the Fernwood Mining Company, had been established to operate the Wheelbarrow Mine. This new company quickly recognized the UMW as a collective bargaining organization and began operating the mine as a union mine, thus bringing about an end to the strike in November 1917.

== Aftermath ==
=== Continued legal battle ===
Despite the conclusion of the strike, legal actions persisted for several more years between the UMW and PMC over the union's alleged violations of the Sherman Antitrust Act. According to the suit, the company alleged that the union had engaged in conspiracy by negotiating wages with the Central Competitive Field, an employers' organization representing coal mining interests in the Midwestern United States, in an effort to disrupt the interstate commerce of coal mined by non-union mines, such as the Wheelbarrow Mine under PMC operation. The company also alleged that the union had engaged in other unlawful activities, including terrorism, that had affected the company's ability to operate the mine, causing the company to fail to earn an estimated $75,000 per year that their accountants had estimated they could earn from the mine operations.

The case was first heard by Judge Frank A. Youmans of the United States District Court for the Western District of Arkansas in March 1920 at Fort Smith, Arkansas, roughly 60 miles (97 km) away from Clarksville. On April 22, Judge Youmans decided in favor of the company and ruled that PMC had suffered $100,000 in damages. For recovery, the judge tripled this amount, ordering the union to pay the company $300,000. However, the union immediately filed an appeal and the case was elevated to the United States Court of Appeals for the Eighth Circuit. The UMW argued that, as a labor union, they were exempt from the definition of conspiracy listed in the Sherman Antitrust Act based on the Clayton Antitrust Act of 1914. Additionally, the union raised questions concerning the legality of some of the PMC's legal counsel's actions and argued that the initial court case had been rife with hearsay and unfounded speculation. On March 11, 1926, the Court of Appeals reversed the lower court's decision and ordered a retrial, overseen by Judge Youmans, which ultimately upheld the Appeals Court's decision, resulting in the union winning court costs, but nothing else. The company then appealed this new ruling to the Appeals Court, which, in a final hearing on the matter in September 1928, sustained their original ruling against the company, bringing close to ten years of litigation to a close.

=== Legacy ===
Writing about the strike in 1984, historian Suzanne S. Lewis stated that "[t]he drama between labor and management, performed on a small stage in Jamestown, Arkansas, evolved into a microcosm of the national labor struggle being waged by unions in their fight for respectability during the twenties". However, despite the union's victory, by 1927, the coal mining industry in Arkansas was in a state of decline and the power of local labor unions, such as the UMW, began to similarly decline as more companies began to employ non-union workers in the region. By 2014, the state of Arkansas produced only about 1,000 tons of coal, compared to 395 million tons produced in Wyoming, the state with the largest coal industry in the United States at that time. Multiple memorials to coal miners exist in Arkansas, particularly in the western part of the state, in cities such as Greenwood and Paris.

== See also ==
- Hartford coal mine riot

== Sources ==
- Balogh, George W. (December 20, 2023). "Immigration". Encyclopedia of Arkansas. Archived from the original on January 21, 2024.
- Dillard, Tom (March 10, 2019) [April 11, 2004]. "Convicts as coal miners". Arkansas Democrat-Gazette. WEHCO Media. ISSN 1060-4332. OCLC 50767083. Archived from the original on March 19, 2022.
- Griffis, Kayla (October 26, 2021). "United Mine Workers of America (UMWA)". Encyclopedia of Arkansas. Archived from the original on December 21, 2023.
- Johnson, Jennifer Koenig (November 29, 2023). "Spadra (Johnson County)". Encyclopedia of Arkansas. Archived from the original on December 21, 2023.
- Langford, Ella Molloy (December 1921). Johnson County, Arkansas: The First Hundred Years. Clarksville, Arkansas: Sallis, Threadgill & Sallis.
- Lewis, Suzanne S. (Autumn 1984). "The Wheelbarrow Strike of 1915: Union Solidarity in Arkansas". The Arkansas Historical Quarterly. 43 (3). Arkansas Historical Association: 208–221. doi:10.2307/40027709. ISSN 0004-1823. JSTOR 40027709.
- Reed, Bernard (June 16, 2023). "Wheelbarrow Strike of 1915". Encyclopedia of Arkansas. Archived from the original on December 25, 2023.
- Schneider, Connie Las (October 1, 2010). "Bloody Clarksville". ABOUT the River Valley. Archived from the original on September 26, 2022.
- Varnell, Curtis (November 17, 2021). "Timepiece: Rioting and uprisings in Arkansas coal fields". Southwest Times Record. Gannett. Archived from the original on November 27, 2022.
