= Hackett High School =

Location
- 102 North Oak Street; Hackett, Arkansas 72937; United States; 35°11′16″N 94°24′31″W

Information
- School type: Public comprehensive
- Status: Open
- School district: Hackett School District
- CEEB code: 040985
- NCES School ID: 050717000435
- Teaching staff: 53.54 (on FTE basis)
- Grades: 7–12
- Enrollment: 327 (2023-2024)
- Student to teacher ratio: 6.11
- Education system: ADE Smart Core
- Classes offered: Regular, Advanced Placement (AP)
- Colors: Black and gold
- Athletics conference: 2A–4 (Football); 2A–4 West (Basketball)
- Mascot: Hornet
- Team name: Hackett Hornets
- Accreditation: ADE
- Website: www.hackettschools.org/high-school-home

Hackett High School is a comprehensive public high school located in the rural community of Hackett, Arkansas, United States. The school provides secondary education for students in grades 7 through 12. It is one of nine public high schools in Sebastian County, Arkansas and the sole high school administered by the Hackett School District.

In addition to Hackett, the school's attendance boundary includes Hartford, Midland, and almost all of Bonanza.

== History ==
The Hackett district closed Hartford High School in 2018, and therefore students in the Hartford area were redirected to Hackett High.

== Academics ==
Hackett High School is accredited by the Arkansas Department of Education (ADE) and has been accredited by AdvancED since 1997. The assumed course of study follows the Smart Core curriculum developed by the ADE, which requires students complete at least 22 units prior to graduation. Students complete regular coursework and exams and may take Advanced Placement (AP) courses and exam with the opportunity to receive college credit prior to high school graduation.

== Extracurricular activities ==
The Hackett High School mascot and athletic emblem is the Hornet with black and gold serving as the school colors.

=== Athletics ===
The Hackett Hornets compete in interscholastic activities within the 2A Classification—the state's second smallest classification—via the 2A Region 4 Conference (football) and 2A Region 4 West Conference (basketball), as administered by the Arkansas Activities Association. The Hornets field teams in football, golf (boys/girls), bowling (boys/girls), basketball (boys/girls), baseball, softball, and cheer.
