= Terry Rice =

American businessman politician

Terry Wilfred Rice

Member of the Arkansas Senate from the 5th district (Previously 9th District)
- Incumbent
- Assumed office January 2015
- Preceded by: Bruce Holland

Member of the Arkansas House of Representatives from the 21st district
- In office 2013 – January 2015
- Preceded by: Nate Steel
- Succeeded by: Marcus Richmond

Member of the Arkansas House of Representatives from the 62nd district
- In office January 2009 – January 2013
- Preceded by: Shirley Ann Walters
- Succeeded by: Tommy Wren

Personal details
- Born: 1954 (age 71–72) Waldron, Scott County; Arkansas, USA
- Party: Republican
- Spouse: JoAnn A. Rice
- Children: Jeremy H. Rice; Paul Rice
- Education: Waldron High School
- Occupation: Businessman in furniture and appliances Cattle rancher

Terry Wilfred Rice (born 1954) is an American politician and furniture and appliance store owner from Waldron, Arkansas. He has been a Republican member of the Arkansas State Senate for District 5 (and previously District 9), which include Scott and Sebastian counties near Fort Smith since January 2015.

From 2009 to 2013, he represented House District 62 in the Arkansas House of Representatives, having succeeded fellow Republican Shirley Ann Walters of Greenwood in Sebastian County. From 2013 to 2015, he represented District 21. Term-limited in the House, he ran instead for the state Senate.

== Political life ==
=== 2008 campaign for state representative ===
In 2008, Rice won the District 62 seat by defeating Democrat Bill Walters of Greenwood, 5,610 (53.2%) to 4,937 (46.8%). Walters was the husband of Shirley A. Walters a former Republican member of the Arkansas State Senate.

Both Rice's father and grandfather were Democratic members of the Arkansas House. Wilfred R. "Bud" Rice represented south Sebastian and Scott counties from 1977 to 1995. Bud Rice's father, Worth Rice, served in the House representing Scott County from 1935 to 1939.

Rice describes himself as "passionate in my belief that we cannot continue the status quo. We cannot tax and spend our way to prosperity. Government must become more efficient just as successful businesses have. ... I believe our faith, life and family values are the foundation of this great country and must stand before political correctness."

Rice is chairman of the House Performance Review Committee and also serves on the Insurance and Commerce and Public Transportation committees. He is vice chairman of the Arkansas Legislative Council.

An anti-abortion legislator, Rice voted to ban abortions after twenty weeks of gestation or whenever a "fetal heartbeat" is determined. He voted to declare the death of a fetus a felony in certain situations. Rice voted to allow university and college staff to carry concealed weapons on campus to enhance security. He also voted to require picture identification for voting. Rice voted to allow the sale of unpasteurized milk in Arkansas. He voted for a spending cap on state spending; this passed the House by two votes. In 2011, he voted to ban cell phones in school zones for safety reasons.

In 2013, Rice was defeated, 52-46, in a bid to become the first Republican Speaker of the Arkansas House of Representatives since Reconstruction by another Republican who had Democratic support, attorney/banker Davy Carter of Cabot in Lonoke County.

=== 2014 campaign for state senate ===
Rice was term-limited and hence ineligible to seek a fourth two-year term in the House in 2014. Rice instead challenged District 9 State Senator Bruce Holland of Greenwood in Sebastian County in the May 20 Republican primary. Rice prevailed in the primary, receiving 3,457 votes (56%) to Holland's 2,710 (44%).

Preceded by redistricted	Arkansas State Senator for District 5 (Scott and Sebastian counties); 2022–	Succeeded by Incumbent
Preceded by Bruce Holland	Arkansas State Senator for District 9 (Scott and Sebastian counties); 2015–2022	Succeeded by redistricted
Preceded by Nate Steel	Arkansas State Representative for District 21 (Scott County); 2013–2015	Succeeded by Marcus Richmond
Preceded by Shirley A. Walters	Arkansas State Representative for District 62 (Scott County); 2009–2013	Succeeded by Tommy Wren
