= Greenwood High School (Arkansas) =

Location
- 400 East Gary Street; Greenwood, Arkansas 72936; United States; 35°13′8″N 94°15′14″W

Information
- Established: 1915 (111 years ago)
- Status: Open
- School board: Greenwood School Board
- School district: Greenwood School District
- NCES District ID: 0506990
- Oversight: Arkansas Department of Education (ADE)
- CEEB code: 040955
- NCES School ID: 050699000424
- Grades: 10-12
- Enrollment: 874 (2023-24)
- Student to teacher ratio: 15.21
- Education system: ADE Smart Core curriculum
- Classes offered: Regular, Advanced Placement
- Hours in school day: 8:00AM - 3:05PM
- Campus type: Rural
- Colors: Navy blue and white
- Athletics conference: 6A West (2024-2026)
- Mascot: Bulldog
- Team name: Greenwood Bulldogs
- Rival: Southside High School Lake Hamilton High School
- Accreditation: AdvancED
- Feeder schools: Greenwood Junior High School
- Affiliation: Arkansas Activities Association (AAA)
- Website: www.greenwoodk12.com/o/ghs

Greenwood High School is a comprehensive public high school established in 1915 serving the community of Greenwood, Arkansas, United States. Located in Sebastian County and within the Fort Smith metropolitan area, Greenwood High School is the sole high school managed by the Greenwood School District and serves students in grades ten through twelve.

== Academics ==
=== Curriculum ===
The assumed course of study at Greenwood High School is the Smart Core curriculum developed by the Arkansas Department of Education (ADE). Greenwood High School was first accredited by the North Central Association in 1977, followed by accreditation by AdvancED when the NCA unified with AdvancED starting in 2009-10. Students engage in regular and Advanced Placement (AP) coursework and exams to obtain at least 22 units before graduation. Exceptional students have been recognized as National Merit Finalists and participated in Arkansas Governor's School.

=== Awards and recognition ===
In 2012, Greenwood School District and its high school were recognized in the AP District of the Year Awards program in the College Board's 3rd Annual Honor Roll that consisted of 539 U.S. public school districts (6 in Arkansas) that simultaneously achieved increases in access to AP® courses for a broader number of students and improved the rate at which their AP students earned scores of 3 or higher on an AP Exam.

== Extracurricular activities ==
The Greenwood High School mascot is the bulldog and navy blue and white serve as the school colors.

=== Athletics ===
For the 2012–2014 seasons, the Greenwood Bulldogs participate in the state's second largest classification (6A) within the combined 6A West Conference. Competition is primarily sanctioned by the Arkansas Activities Association with the Bulldogs competing in baseball, basketball (boys/girls), bowling, competitive cheer, cross country, dance, debate, football, golf (boys/girls), soccer (boys and girls), softball, speech, swimming (girls), tennis (boys/girls, track and field, volleyball, and wrestling.

The Bulldogs football team has made 19 appearances in the state finals, winning Twelve state football championships (2000, 2005, 2006, 2007, 2010, 2011, 2012, 2017, 2018, 2020, 2023, 2024, 2025) The Bulldogs finished as runners-up in 1996, 2004, 2015, and 2016, 2021, 2022, 2025. At the close of the 2012 season the football team had the third-longest win streak in state history at 38. Home winning streak at 70.

The girls' golf team won four state titles between 2003 and 2010. The boys' bowling team won the 2007 6A state championship, with the girls' bowling team taking the 2009 state title.

The boys wrestling team won three consecutive dual state titles from 2019 to 2021 and two individual state titles in 2020 and 2021. The boys and girls wrestling team won academic state titles in 2021 and 2022

== Notable alumni ==
- Lee Johnson, American politician from Arkansas
- Drew Morgan (2013) – American football wide receiver for the Arkansas Razorbacks. Signed a free agent contract with the Miami Dolphins in 2017.
- Grant Morgan (2016) – American football linebacker for the Arkansas Razorbacks. Won the Burlsworth Trophy in 2021 as the best player in the nation who began their college career as a walk-on.
- Tyler Wilson (2008) – American football quarterback for the Arkansas Razorbacks; led Greenwood to three consecutive state football titles (2005–07). Led Arkansas to an 11-2 season in 2011 with a victory in the 2012 Cotton Bowl Classic; was the Offensive MVP of that Cotton Bowl. Is currently the only Razorback QB to be named 1st Team All-SEC (2011). Was drafted in the 2013 NFL draft by the Oakland Raiders.
