= Mansfield School District (Arkansas) =

School district in Arkansas

Location
- 402 Grove Street; Mansfield, Arkansas 72944 United States

District information
- Grades: PK–12
- Established: January 9, 1889
- Accreditation: Arkansas Department of Education
- Schools: 3
- NCES District ID: 0509330

Students and staff
- Students: 958
- Teachers: 74.01 (on FTE basis)
- Staff: 150.01 (on FTE basis)
- Student–teacher ratio: 12.94
- Athletic conference: 3A 4 (2012–14)
- District mascot: Tiger
- Colors: Red; White

Other information
- Website: www.mansfieldtigers.org

Mansfield School District is a public school district based in Mansfield, Arkansas. MSD provides early childhood, elementary and secondary education to more than 950 students and employs more than 150 educators and staff for its three schools and district offices.

The school district encompasses 135.74 square miles (351.6 km^{2}) of land in Scott, Sebastian, and Logan counties.

Within Sebastian County the school district boundary includes that county's part of Mansfield and all of Huntington. The portion of the district in Scott County includes the remainder of Mansfield.

== History ==
On January 8, 1889, the Mansfield School District was formed. A two-story school building was constructed to meet growing educational needs in 1905 at the cost of $10,000; it served the district until a new high school was built in 1968. Many area schools were consolidated into the district, with the last being the Huntington district in the mid-1960s.

The Phyllis Wheatley School, located in Huntington, was a school established for the African-American children in the region of south Sebastian County. Students in the first through eighth grades attended the school. Those students above the eighth grade had to attend high school in Fort Smith (Sebastian County), even though a high school was less than a mile away across Cherokee Creek and two miles away in Mansfield. The Phyllis Wheatley School was consolidated with Mansfield Public School in 1962; many other area schools were also consolidated into the Mansfield district around that time.

A new elementary school was built in 1964; it is still used today. In 2004, students began attending a new high school complex, which included a gymnasium and football stadium, built near the old area of the original Chocoville site.

== Schools ==
- Mansfield High School, serving grades 9 through 12.
- Mansfield Middle School, serving grades 5 through 8.
- Mansfield Elementary School, serving prekindergarten through grade 4.
