= Greenwood School District =

Greenwood School District or the Greenwood Public School District may refer to:

- Greenwood School District (Arkansas)
- Greenwood Public School District (Mississippi)
- Greenwood School District (Pennsylvania)
