= Shirley A. Walters =

American politician

Member of the Arkansas House of Representatives from the 62nd district
- In office 2003–2008
- Preceded by: Dean Elliott
- Succeeded by: Terry Rice

Personal details
- Born: November 12, 1948 (age 77) Lonoke, Arkansas
- Party: Republican
- Spouse: Bill Walters (died 2013)
- Children: 3
- Education: B.S., Arkansas Tech University, 1970
- Occupation: Teacher, business owner

Shirley Ann Walters (born November 12, 1948) is a former member of the Arkansas House of Representatives from Greenwood in Sebastian County, Arkansas. She is a Republican.

Born in Lonoke, Arkansas, Walters graduated from Arkansas Tech University in Russellville and was a teacher, business owner, and was engaged in the real estate business. From 2003 to 2008, she served in the Arkansas House. Her husband, Bill Walters, served as a Republican in the Arkansas State Senate from 1983 to 2000. In 2008, Bill Walters ran as a Democrat to succeed his term-limited wife for the District 62 seat in the Arkansas House, but he was defeated by the Republican nominee, Terry Rice of Waldron in Scott County.
