= Greenwood Public Schools =

Greenwood Public Schools can refer to:

- Greenwood School District (Arkansas)
- Greenwood Public School District (Mississippi)
- Greenwood School District 50 (South Carolina)
- School District Of Greenwood (Wisconsin)
