= Bill Walters (Arkansas politician) =

American politician

Member of the Arkansas Senate
- In office 1983–2000

Personal details
- Born: April 17, 1943 Paris, Arkansas, U.S.
- Died: March 5, 2013 (aged 69) Greenwood, Arkansas
- Party: Republican (before 2008) Democratic (2008)
- Spouse: Shirley Ann Walters
- Education: University of Arkansas, Fayetteville (BA); University of Arkansas School of Law (JD)

Bill Walters (April 17, 1943 – March 5, 2013) was an American lawyer, businessman, and politician.

Born in Paris in Logan County in western Arkansas, Walters received his Bachelor of Arts from the University of Arkansas at Fayetteville and his Juris Doctor from the University of Arkansas School of Law. He practiced law in Greenwood in Sebastian County and was a prosecuting attorney, municipal judge, and was engaged in the real estate business. He served from 1983 to 2000 in the Arkansas State Senate as a Republican. His wife, Shirley Ann Walters, served from 2003 to 2008 in the Arkansas House of Representatives as a Republican.

Walters ran in 2008 as a Democrat to succeed his wife in the Arkansas House, but he was defeated by Republican nominee Terry Rice of Waldron.

Walters died at the age of sixty-nine in Greenwood, Arkansas.

Walters appeared on the television series "America's Youth Wants To Know" in 1956. Walters is the 13 year old asking John von Neumann a question about the capacity of operators for mechanical instruments and scholarships for said operators. In the video, Walters tells von Neumann he plans to get into law.
