= Hartford coal mine riot =

Riot in Arkansas, United States

- Date: July 12, 1914
- Location: Hartford, Arkansas, United States
- Deaths: 2

The Hartford coal mine riot occurred on July 12, 1914, at Hartford, Arkansas. In a productive region of a state with 100% of its coal miners represented by the United Mine Workers (UMW), one mine owner attempted to open a non-union shop. In the resulting conflict, mines were flooded by sabotage, and on July 17 a crowd of union miners and sympathizers destroyed the surface plant of the Prairie Creek coal mine #3 and murdered two non-union miners.

Resulting litigation in federal courts stretched to an out-of-court settlement of a nominal $27,500 in 1927.

== Background ==
The coal fields and economic prosperity in Sebastian County, Arkansas, peaked between 1910 and 1920, with the population in Hartford, Arkansas, reaching 4,000 at one point. The clean burning coal yielded from the mines that stretched all along the Hartford/Hackett/Huntington corridor attracted mining interests. Incoming miners were mostly of Italian, German, Polish and Greek heritage.

Local miners had first organized under the Knights of Labor and were, by 1914, earning union wages and benefits under representation of the UMW District 21. All of the mines in the entire state were operated under union representation, except for operations owned by Franklin Bache and Heber Denman.

Since 1910 Bache had been using shell companies to try to circumvent UMW's joint interstate contract and scale of wages for District 21. As that governing agreement was scheduled to expire July 1, 1914, Bache announced in March that he intended to turn his mines into non-union operations. Bache informed Pete Stewart, executive with the UMW, then shut down his mines and prepared to reopen them on an open shop basis on April 6.

Anticipating trouble, Bache employed three guards from the Burns Detective Agency and a number of others to aid him. Hearing rumors of a possible armed confrontation with the disgruntled miners, Bache bought a number of Winchester rifles and ammunition, and surrounded his principal mining plant at Prairie Creek, No. 4, with cables strung on posts.

Bache then had notices prepared and sent to all of his employees who occupied the company's houses that they should vacate unless they remained in his employ under the new conditions. About 30 nonunion men had agreed to show up for work on the date fixed for the mines to be reopened.

The people in the area were urged by the members of the local unions to come to a meeting at the schoolhouse, a short distance from the Prairie Creek mine, for a public protest to the Bache–Denman plans, which they felt would lead to the weakening of the union power throughout the region.

The union officials appointed a committee to visit Bache and insist that the mine under his control remain a union shop. The guards, directed not to use their guns save to defend their own lives, were at the mercy of the union miners, who assaulted them, took their guns away, and injured a number of them. As the union men advanced on the site, the employees deserted the mine which filled with water once the rioters had destroyed the main pumps at the operation.

Bache obtained from the federal District Court an injunction against the union miners and others taking part in the violence, including among them the president of No. 21, Pete Stewart, and other union officials. Bach then prepared to resume mining, with the work progressing under the protection of United States deputy marshals. Meanwhile nonunion miners and other employees were brought in from out of the state and the equipment was repaired and rebuilt.

The United States Marshals were withdrawn from the property on July 15, leaving only private guards and the Burns Detectives. Meanwhile the water had been pumped out and the mining and shipping of coal were about to begin.

== Riot ==
On Sunday night, July 12, about midnight, there was a fusillade of shots into the homes in the small village of Frog town, about a mile and a half from Prairie Creek mine. A number of people, in fright at the cry that "the scabs were surrounding the town", left and went to Hartford, which was about two miles away, and union employed guards were dispatched to Hartford to defend the town against the expected attack by the guards from Prairie Creek.

According to eyewitnesses, the assault upon Frog town was merely a subterfuge and the shooting into the miner’s homes had been done by the Hartford constable—a man named Slankard—and another union miner in an effort to arouse the hostility of the neighborhood against the men at Prairie Creek.

On the night of the July 16, the union miners' families who lived in Prairie Creek were warned by friends to leave that vicinity in order to avoid danger, and at 4 a.m. a volley of many shots fired into the premises began the following morning the attack.

A large force of union miners of the local unions and those from other mines in District No. 21, as well as their sympathizers, armed themselves with rifles and other guns furnished and paid for by District No. 21 funds, and before daylight on July 17 began an attack upon the men whom Bache had brought together, and proceeded to destroy the property and equipment again. A large, union backed force with guns attacked the Prairie Creek site and other properties belonging to Bache, from all sides later on in the day.

The first movement toward destruction of property was at Mine No. 3, a short distance from No. 4, where the coal washhouse was set on fire. The occupants of the premises were driven out, except a few who stayed and entrenched themselves behind coal cars or other protection. Most of the employees and their families fled to the ridges, behind which they were able to escape danger from the flying bullets.

The forces surrounding the mine were so numerous that by 1 p.m. they had driven out practically all of the defenders, and set fire to the coal tipple of mine No. 4, and destroyed all the plant by the use of dynamite and torches.

The assailants took some of Bache's employees prisoners as they were escaping, and took them to a log cabin behind the schoolhouse near the mine where the first riot meeting was held. The four or five prisoners were taken out of the cabin where they had been for a short time confined, and two of them, one a former union man, were deliberately murdered in the presence of their captors. The two were identified as 23-year-old J.E. Sylesberry and 45-year-old John Baskins, both mine guards.

== Aftermath ==
Bache declared his ten businesses bankrupt on July 25, resulting in a decisive victory for the union.

Litigation arising from the strike and riot reached the Supreme Court not once but twice, in 1922 as Mine Workers v. Coronado Coal Co., 259 U.S. 344 and in 1925 as Coronado Coal Co. v. Mine Workers, 268 U.S. 295. The receivers of the mine owners had alleged restraint of trade against the union. Ultimately the parties settled out of court in 1927 for $27,500, reversing prior awards of more than $700,000. By that time, mine workers' unions in Arkansas had completely collapsed.

Federal indictments came down on a number of prominent labor figures. In a plea deal arranged between prosecutors and the UMW, a few defendants received jail time of up to two years, and fines of up to $1000. The union paid the fines. Two men were tried for the murders of Sylesberry and Baskins in January 1915. Partly because "most of the state's witnesses could not be found when it came to trial", both were acquitted.

== See also ==
- 1915–1917 Wheelbarrow Mine strike
