= Sebastian County Road 4G Bridge =

- U.S. National Register of Historic Places
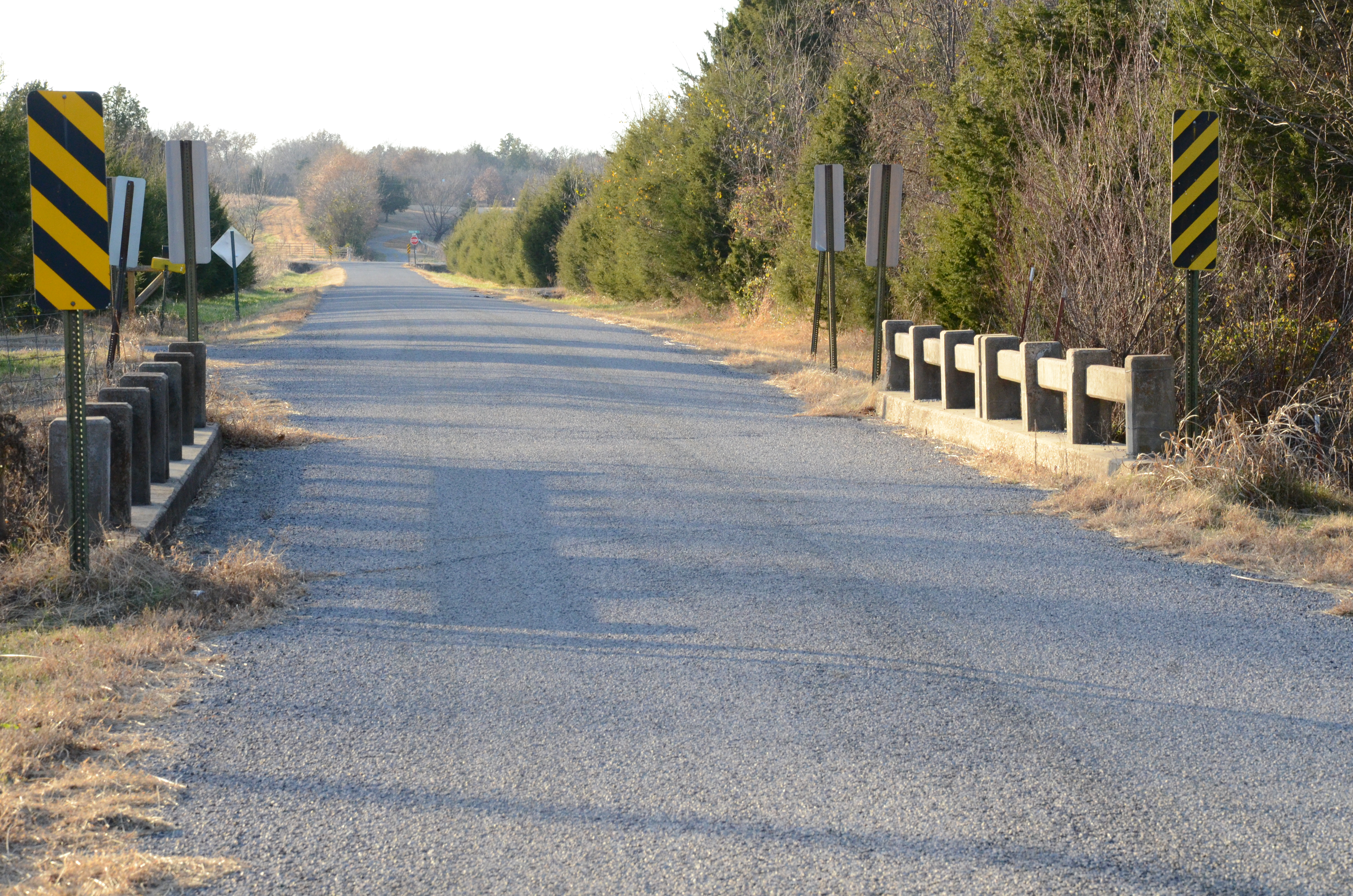
- Bridge in 2014

- Location within Arkansas Location within the United States
- Location: Southwest of populated place West Hartford, Arkansas, itself southwest of Hartford, Arkansas
- Coordinates: 34.99047°N 94.41896°W
- Area: less than one acre
- Built: 1940
- Built by: Works Progress Administration
- Architectural style: Reinforced concrete deck bridge with open masonry substructure
- MPS: Historic Bridges of Arkansas MPS
- NRHP reference No.: 95000569
- Added to NRHP: May 5, 1995

The Sebastian County Road 4G Bridge is a historic bridge in rural Sebastian County, Arkansas, United States. The bridge carries County Road 4 (West Harmony Road) across an unnamed tributary of Sugar Loaf Creek southwest of West Hartford, between County Roads 1 and 243. It has two spans with a total length of 44 feet (13 m). The width is 18 feet (5.5 m) curb-to-curb and 21 feet (6.4 m) overall. The two spans rest on a single center stone pier, and both abutments are also made of stone masonry. The road deck is reinforced concrete with simple concrete railings on the sides. Built in 1940, it is a well-preserved example of a concrete bridge from the World War II era of bridge construction in the state, when steel had become scarce. The bridge was listed on the National Register of Historic Places in 1995.

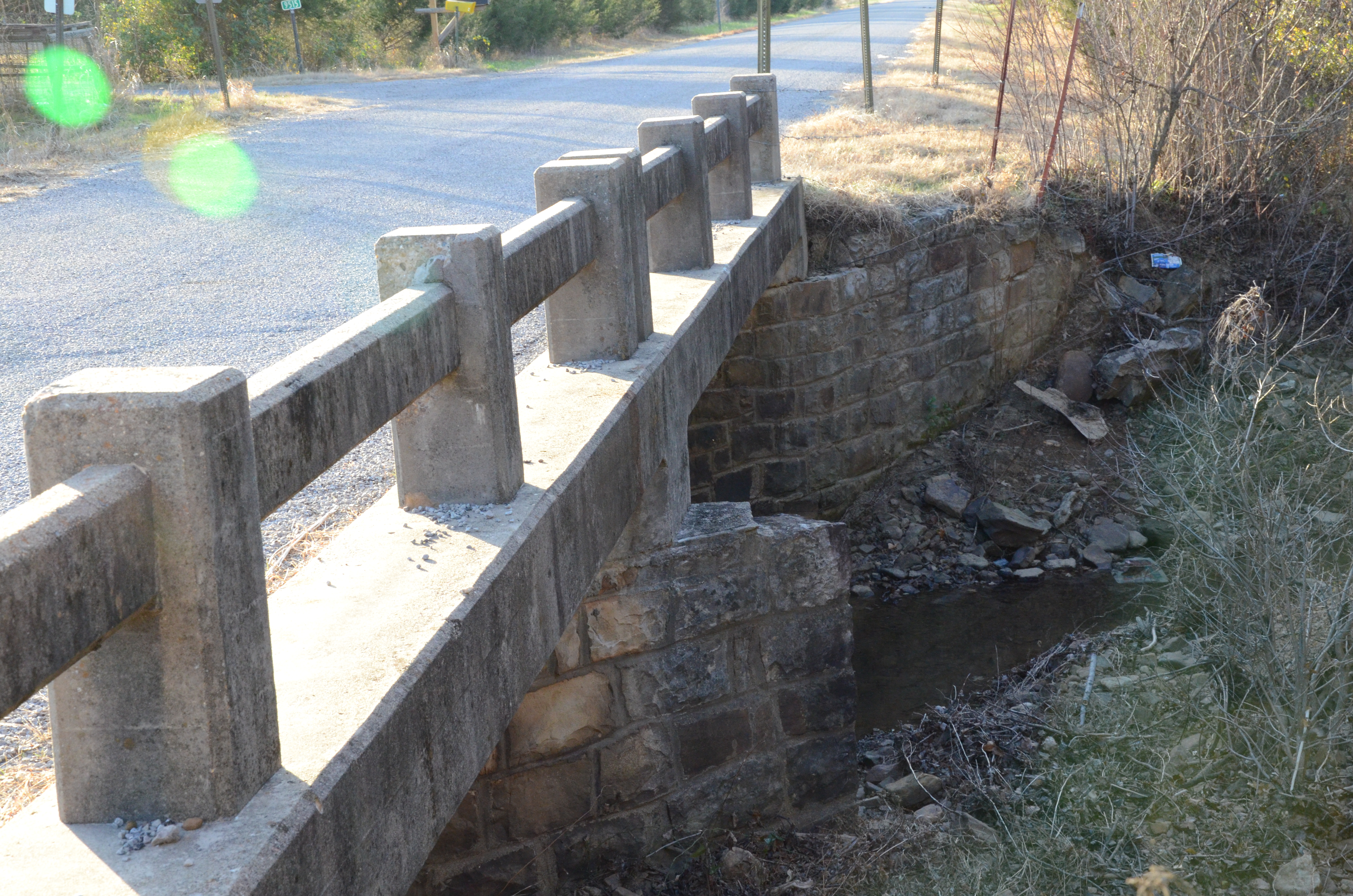
Substructure including center stone pier and an abutment

In 1939, Sebastian County official decided to request the assistance of the New Deal Depression-era public relief agencies of President Franklin D. Roosevelt to improve rural roads throughout the county. The Works Progress Administration approved funding of $1,226,362 on December 11, 1939, for a county-wide project to "improve roads, including clearing; grubbing; excavating and grading; constructing curbs, gutters and bridges; draining; laying pipe; surfacing; and performing incidental and appurtenant work."

The Sebastian County Road 4G Bridge was built as part of this effort. The bridge was likely designed by an engineer with the Arkansas State Highway Commission. It was built in 1940 with the WPA funding and carries an historical association with the World War II era and open masonry substructure bridges. At the time of its listing, it was considered "relatively intact" and its condition "retain[ed] sufficient integrity to remain associated with its historic period." It was eligible under Criterion C, the distinctive characteristics of design/engineering/construction.

A 1990 study reviewed 2,496 bridges built in Arkansas before 1941 which survived to 1990 and identified just 51 as potentially National Register-eligible. By its listing, the County Road 4G bridge was deemed consistent with the standards determined in that study, as a good surviving example of its type.

It is located near the Oklahoma border, southwest of populated place West Hartford, Arkansas, itself southwest of Hartford, Arkansas.

== See also ==
- National Register of Historic Places listings in Sebastian County, Arkansas
- List of bridges on the National Register of Historic Places in Arkansas
