= Greenwood Presbyterian Church =

Historic church in Arkansas, United States

- U.S. National Register of Historic Places
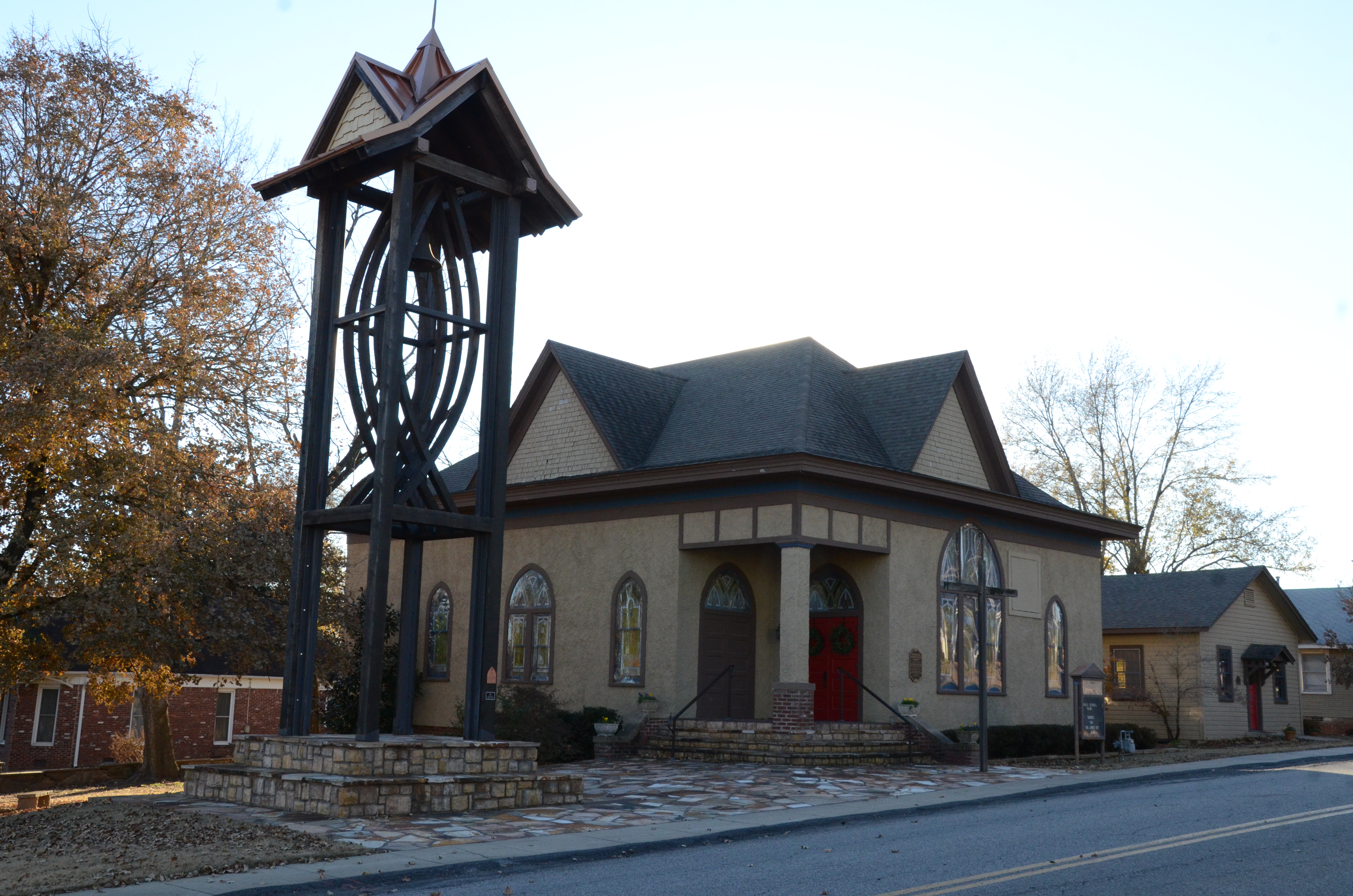

- Location within Arkansas Location within the United States
- Location: 103 W. Denver St., Greenwood, Arkansas
- Coordinates: 35°13′3″N 94°15′30″W
- Area: less than one acre
- Built: 1922
- Architect: Johnson, Merle
- Architectural style: Late Gothic Revival
- NRHP reference No.: 08000955
- Added to NRHP: October 1, 2008

Greenwood Presbyterian Church, now known as the Good Shepherd Presbyterian Church, is a historic church at 103 W. Denver Street in Greenwood, Arkansas. The congregation was organized in 1853, and this vernacular Gothic Revival building, constructed in 1922, served as its second sanctuary. It has a roughly rectangular shape, with stuccoed walls and a hip roof, that is pierced on each side by a large clapboarded gable. Adjacent to the building is a free-standing open belltower, which features a Christian fish element in its upper portion. It is topped by a small gabled roof with a pointed spire at the center.

The building was listed on the National Register of Historic Places in 2008.

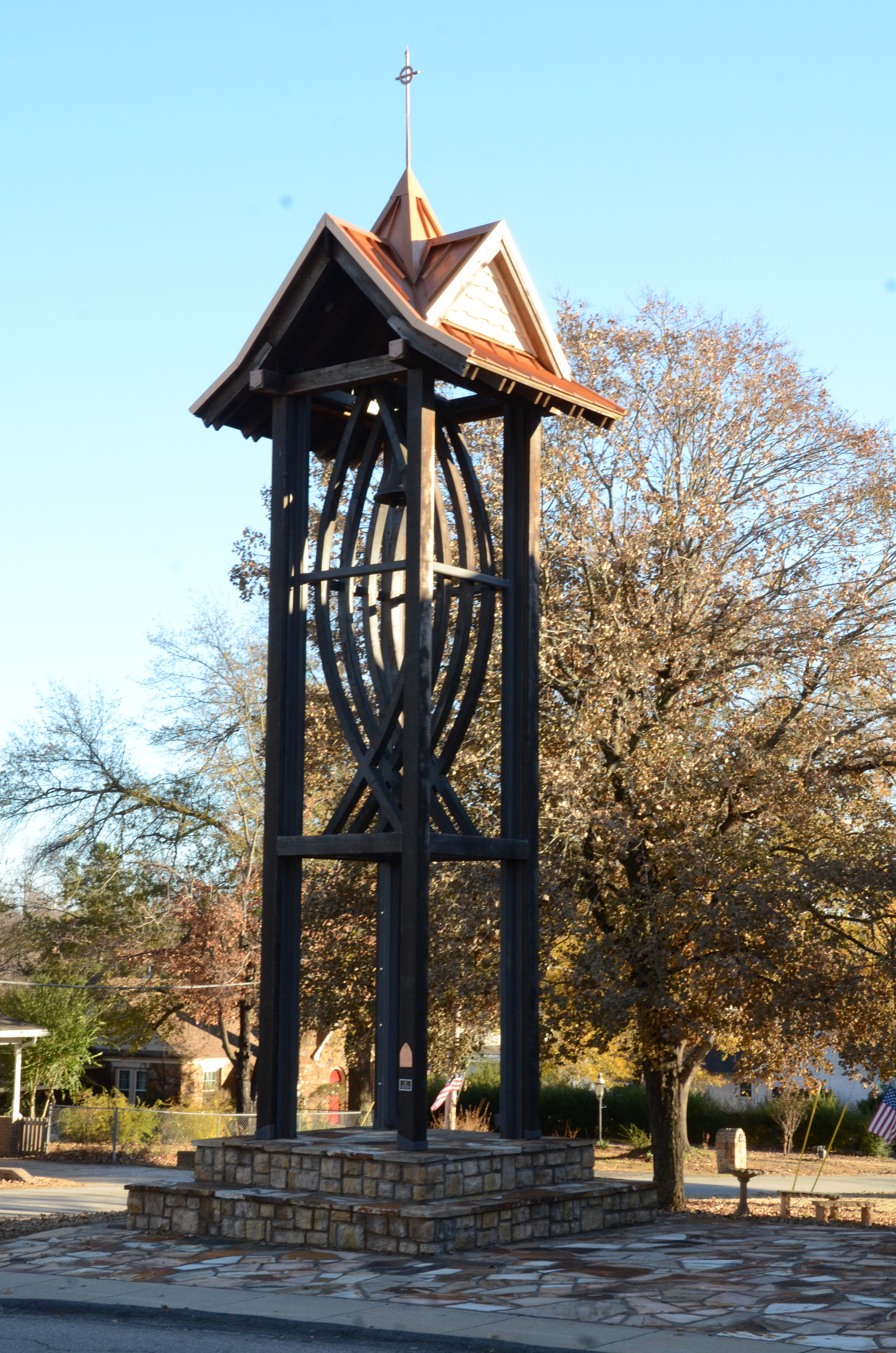
Bell Tower

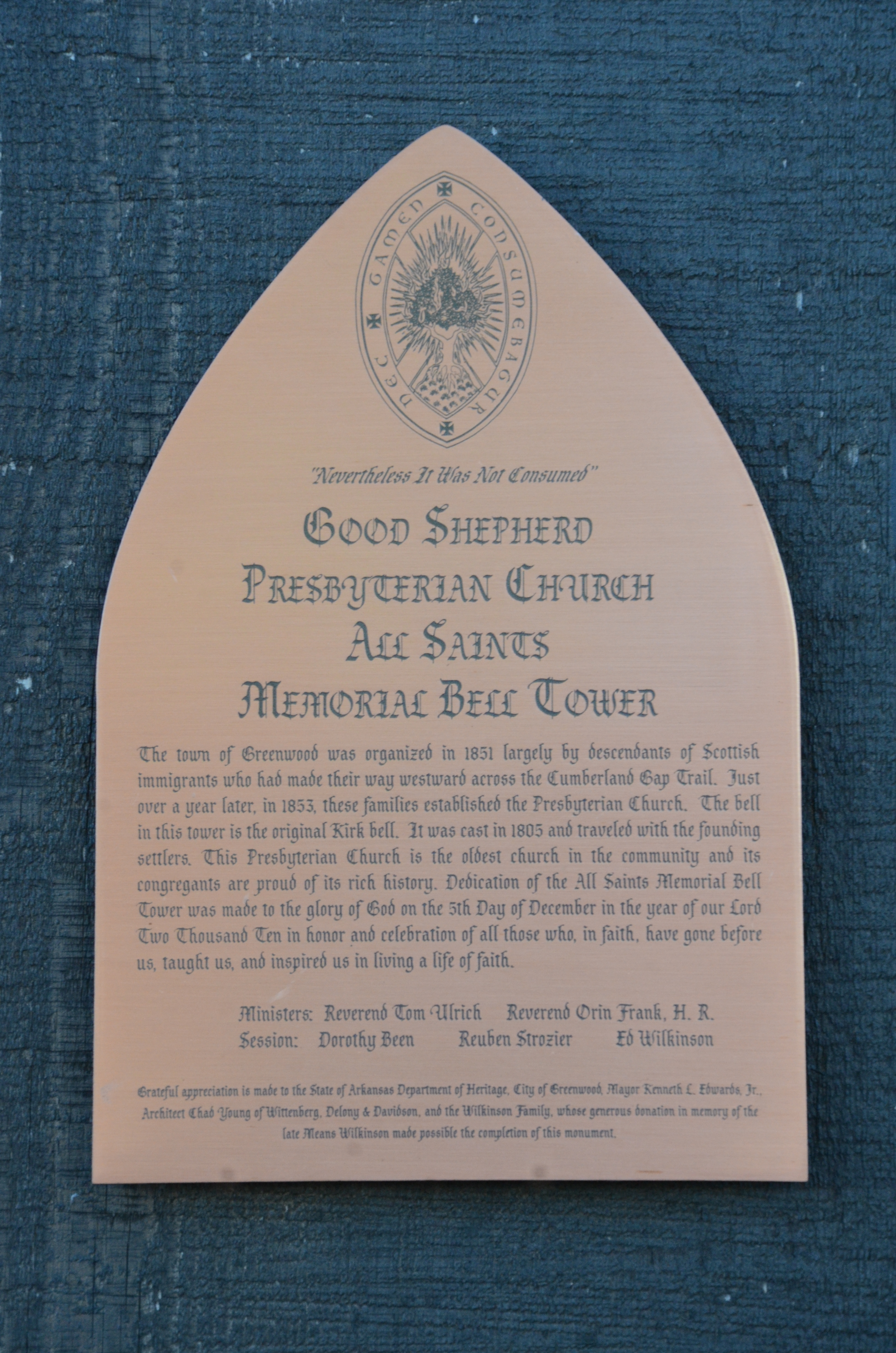
Plaque on the Bell Tower

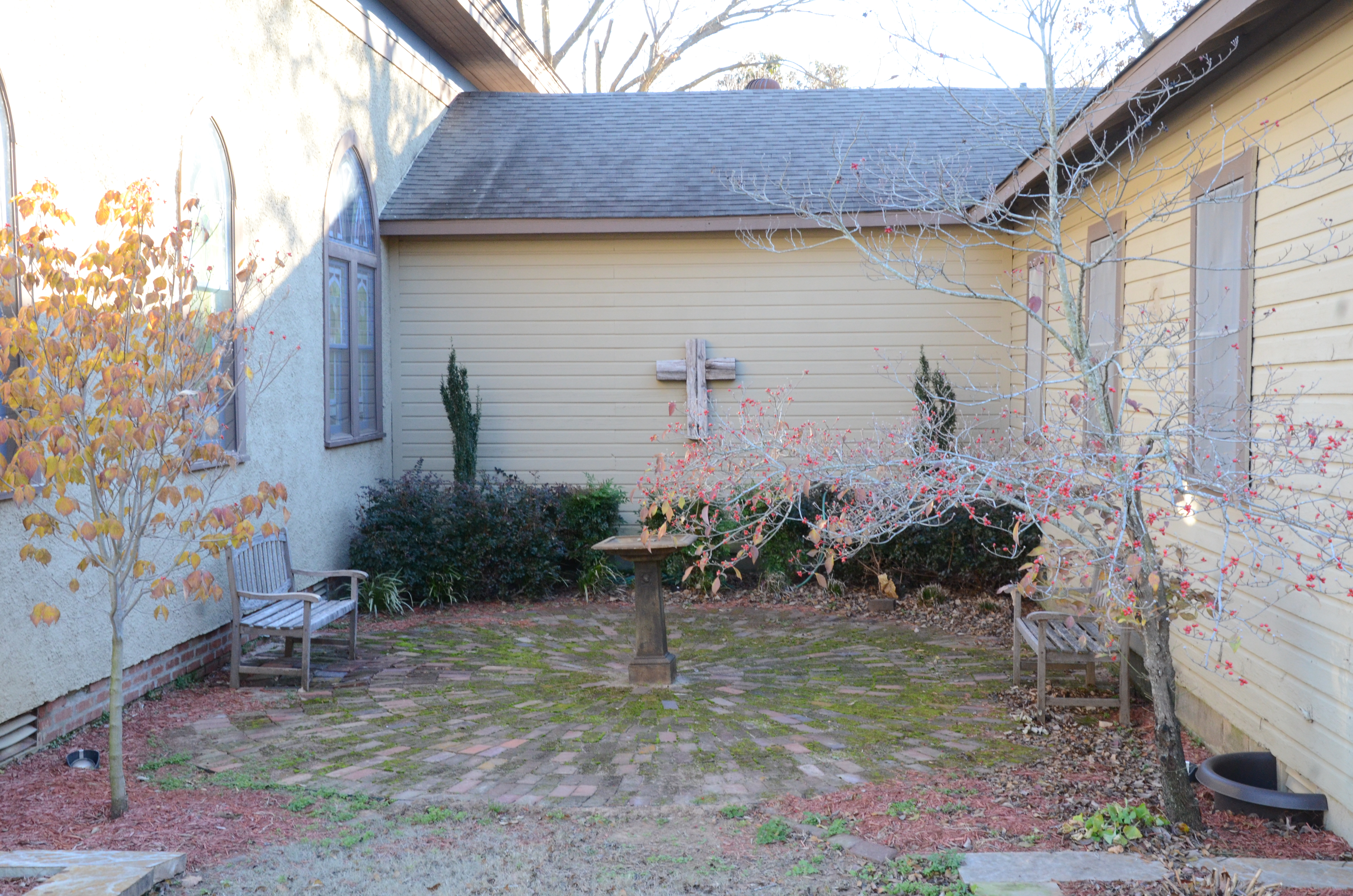
Garden Behind the Sanctuary

== See also ==
- National Register of Historic Places listings in Sebastian County, Arkansas
