= Mansfield, Arkansas =

- City
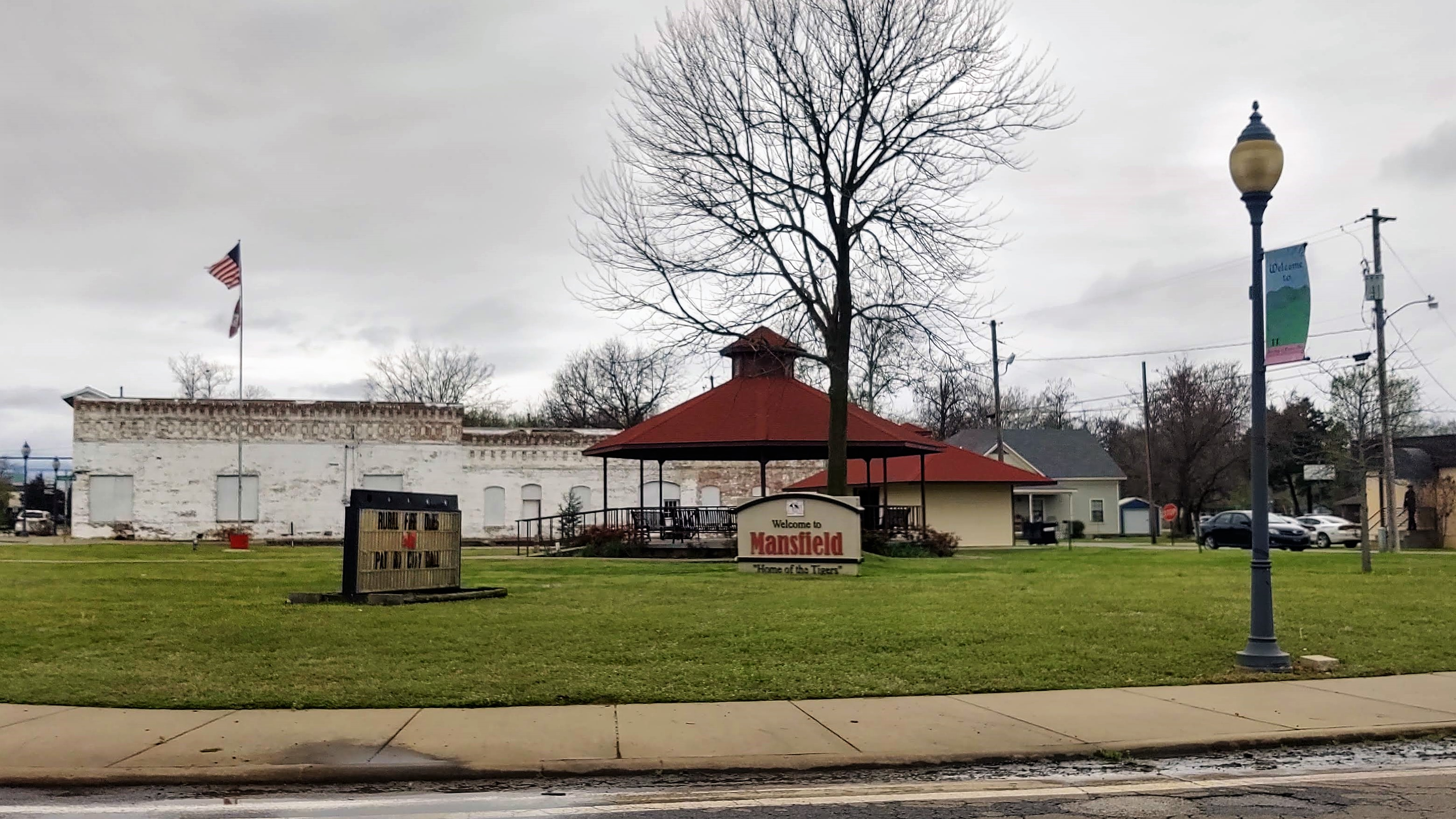
- Park in downtown Mansfield
- Motto: "Gateway to Poteau Mountain"
- Location of Mansfield in Scott County and Sebastian County, Arkansas.
- Coordinates: 35°03′40″N 94°14′47″W
- Country: United States
- State: Arkansas
- Counties: Sebastian, Scott

Area
  - Total: 2.35 sq mi (6.08 km^{2})
  - Land: 2.31 sq mi (5.99 km^{2})
  - Water: 0.035 sq mi (0.09 km^{2})
- Elevation: 620 ft (190 m)

Population (2020)
  - Total: 1,053
  - Estimate (2025): 1,066 ▲
  - Density: 455.5/sq mi (175.86/km^{2})
- Time zone: UTC-6 (Central (CST))
  - Summer (DST): UTC-5 (CDT)
- ZIP code: 72944
- Area code: 479
- FIPS code: 05-43880
- GNIS feature ID: 2405011
- Website: mansfieldar.org

Mansfield is a city in Scott and Sebastian counties in Arkansas, United States. The Sebastian County portion of the city is part of the Fort Smith, Arkansas-Oklahoma Metropolitan Statistical Area. As of the 2020 census, Mansfield had a population of 1,053.

== History ==
Mansfield was platted in 1887 when the railroad was extended to that point. The city most likely was named for William W. Mansfield, a Justice of the Arkansas Supreme Court.

== Geography ==
According to the United States Census Bureau, the city has a total area of 2.2 square miles (5.7 km^{2}), of which 2.2 square miles (5.7 km^{2}) is land and 0.04 square miles (0.10 km^{2}) (0.89%) is water.

== Demographics ==
Historical population
Census	Pop.	Note	%±
1890	243		—
1900	368		51.4%
1910	816		121.7%
1920	923		13.1%
1930	919		−0.4%
1940	1,002		9.0%
1950	869		−13.3%
1960	881		1.4%
1970	981		11.4%
1980	1,000		1.9%
1990	1,018		1.8%
2000	1,097		7.8%
2010	1,139		3.8%
2020	1,053		−7.6%
2025 (est.)	1,066	▲	1.2%
U.S. Decennial Census

=== 2020 census ===
As of the 2020 census, Mansfield had a population of 1,053. The median age was 37.1 years. 25.5% of residents were under the age of 18 and 16.2% of residents were 65 years of age or older. For every 100 females there were 89.7 males, and for every 100 females age 18 and over there were 88.0 males age 18 and over.

0.0% of residents lived in urban areas, while 100.0% lived in rural areas.

There were 408 households in Mansfield, of which 38.2% had children under the age of 18 living in them. Of all households, 46.3% were married-couple households, 18.1% were households with a male householder and no spouse or partner present, and 28.4% were households with a female householder and no spouse or partner present. About 25.0% of all households were made up of individuals and 12.2% had someone living alone who was 65 years of age or older.

There were 474 housing units, of which 13.9% were vacant. The homeowner vacancy rate was 2.1% and the rental vacancy rate was 15.6%.

Mansfield racial composition
Race	Number	Percentage
White (non-Hispanic)	908	86.23%
Black or African American (non-Hispanic)	6	0.57%
Native American	25	2.37%
Asian	13	1.23%
Pacific Islander	4	0.38%
Other/Mixed	62	5.89%
Hispanic or Latino	35	3.32%

=== 2013 ===
As of the census of 2013, there were 1,121 people in 440 households, including 289 families, in the city. The population density was 493.2 inhabitants per square mile (190.4/km^{2}). There were 505 housing units at an average density of 227.1 per square mile (87.7/km^{2}). The racial makeup of the city was 95.81% White, 0.09% Black or African American, 1.09% Native American, 0.46% Asian, 0.91% from other races, and 1.64% from two or more races. 3.37% of the population were Hispanic or Latino of any race.

Of the 440 households, 33.6% had children under the age of 18 living with them, 52.3% were married couples living together, 10.5% had a female householder with no husband present, and 34.3% were non-families. 31.6% of households were one person and 15.7% were one person aged 65 or older. The average household size was 2.49 and the average family size was 3.13.

The age distribution was 27.9% under the age of 18, 10.7% from 18 to 24, 28.5% from 25 to 44, 18.7% from 45 to 64, and 14.2% 65 or older. The median age was 35 years. For every 100 females, there were 91.4 males. For every 100 females age 18 and over, there were 87.0 males.

The median household income was $26,938 and the median family income was $35,000. Males had a median income of $28,534 versus $19,063 for females. The per capita income for the city was $13,012. About 13.2% of families and 18.0% of the population were below the poverty line, including 32.1% of those under age 18 and 12.9% of those age 65 or over.

== Education ==
Public education for early childhood, elementary and secondary students are zoned to attend Mansfield School District, which leads to graduation from Mansfield High School.

== Notable persons ==
- Mark Darr, former Arkansas lieutenant governor, graduated in 1991 from Mansfield High School.

== See also ==
- List of cities and towns in Arkansas
