= Hackett, Arkansas =

- City
- Location of Hackett in Sebastian County, Arkansas.
- Coordinates: 35°11′16″N 94°24′38″W
- Country: United States
- State: Arkansas
- County: Sebastian

Area
  - Total: 1.46 sq mi (3.79 km^{2})
  - Land: 1.44 sq mi (3.72 km^{2})
  - Water: 0.027 sq mi (0.07 km^{2})
- Elevation: 535 ft (163 m)

Population (2020)
  - Total: 784
  - Estimate (2025): 857 ▲
  - Density: 550/sq mi (211/km^{2})
- Time zone: UTC-6 (Central (CST))
  - Summer (DST): UTC-5 (CDT)
- ZIP code: 72937
- Area code: 479
- FIPS code: 05-29290
- GNIS feature ID: 2403778

Hackett is a city in Sebastian County, Arkansas, United States. It is part of the Fort Smith, Arkansas-Oklahoma Metropolitan Statistical Area. As of the 2020 census, Hackett had a population of 784.

== History ==
A post office called Hackett City was established in 1877, and the name was changed to Hackett in 1887. The city has the name of B. F. Hackett, the original owner of the town site.

== Geography ==
According to the United States Census Bureau, the city has a total area of 1.6 square miles (4.1 km^{2}), all land.

== Demographics ==
Historical population
Census	Pop.	Note	%±
1880	172		—
1890	458		166.3%
1900	330		−27.9%
1910	363		10.0%
1920	398		9.6%
1930	316		−20.6%
1940	436		38.0%
1950	440		0.9%
1960	328		−25.5%
1970	462		40.9%
1980	505		9.3%
1990	490		−3.0%
2000	694		41.6%
2010	812		17.0%
2020	784		−3.4%
2025 (est.)	857	▲	9.3%
U.S. Decennial Census

At the 2000 census, there were 694 people, 277 households and 193 families residing in the city. The population density was 424.8 inhabitants per square mile (164.0/km^{2}). There were 294 housing units at an average density of 179.9 per square mile (69.5/km^{2}). The racial makeup of the city was 95.10% White, 0.43% Black or African American, 2.16% Native American, 1.15% Asian, 0.14% from other races, and 1.01% from two or more races. 0.72% of the population were Hispanic or Latino of any race.

There were 277 households, of which 33.9% had children under the age of 18 living with them, 49.1% were married couples living together, 14.4% had a female householder with no husband present, and 30.0% were non-families. 27.4% of all households were made up of individuals, and 13.4% had someone living alone who was 65 years of age or older. The average household size was 2.51 and the average family size was 3.00.

27.5% of the population were under the age of 18, 8.2% from 18 to 24, 29.8% from 25 to 44, 21.9% from 45 to 64, and 12.5% who were 65 years of age or older. The median age was 35 years. For every 100 females, there were 89.1 males. For every 100 females age 18 and over, there were 90.5 males.

The median household income was $30,809 and the median family income was $35,909. Males had a median income of $27,500 versus $20,446 for females. The per capita income for the city was $13,051. About 7.9% of families and 11.0% of the population were below the poverty line, including 9.2% of those under age 18 and 28.4% of those age 65 or over.

== Education ==
Public elementary and secondary schools are administered by the Hackett School District and its two schools. Both schools are fully accredited by the Arkansas Department of Education (ADE) and AdvancED. The district and school mascot and athletic emblem is the Hornet with school colors of black and gold.

- Hackett Elementary School, serving kindergarten through grade 6.
- Hackett High School, serving grades 7 through 12.

== Arts and culture ==
Deer Acres Zoo, located on Jensen Road, has a variety of creatures including capybaras, monkeys and alligators.

== Notable people ==
- Hugh Franklin Waters—U.S. federal judge
- Waylon Wyatt—Singer/Songwriter
