= Midland, Arkansas =

Town in Sebastian County, Arkansas, United States

- Town
- Location of Midland in Sebastian County, Arkansas.
- Coordinates: 35°05′34″N 94°21′11″W
- Country: United States
- State: Arkansas
- County: Sebastian

Area
  - Total: 0.35 sq mi (0.91 km^{2})
  - Land: 0.35 sq mi (0.90 km^{2})
  - Water: 0.0039 sq mi (0.01 km^{2})
- Elevation: 545 ft (166 m)

Population (2020)
  - Total: 227
  - Estimate (2025): 224 ▼
  - Density: 656.2/sq mi (253.37/km^{2})
- Time zone: UTC-6 (Central (CST))
  - Summer (DST): UTC-5 (CDT)
- ZIP code: 72945
- Area code: 479
- FIPS code: 05-45500
- GNIS feature ID: 2406158

Midland is a town in Sebastian County, Arkansas, United States. It is part of the Fort Smith, Arkansas-Oklahoma Metropolitan Statistical Area. As of the 2020 census, Midland had a population of 227.

== Geography ==
According to the United States Census Bureau, the town has a total area of 0.9 km^{2} (0.3 mi^{2}), of which 0.8 km^{2} (0.3 mi^{2}) is land and 0.1 km^{2} (0.04 mi^{2}) (8.82%) is water.

== Demographics ==
Historical population
Census	Pop.	Note	%±
1910	639		—
1920	787		23.2%
1930	373		−52.6%
1940	560		50.1%
1950	356		−36.4%
1960	261		−26.7%
1970	294		12.6%
1980	286		−2.7%
1990	220		−23.1%
2000	253		15.0%
2010	325		28.5%
2020	227		−30.2%
2025 (est.)	224	▼	−1.3%
U.S. Decennial Census

As of the census of 2000, there were 253 people, 96 households, and 72 families residing in the town. The population density was 305.3/km^{2} (795.7/mi^{2}). There were 113 housing units at an average density of 136.3/km^{2} (355.4/mi^{2}). The racial makeup of the town was 96.44% White, 0.40% Black or African American, 1.19% Native American, and 1.98% from two or more races. 1.98% of the population were Hispanic or Latino of any race.

There were 96 households, out of which 38.5% had children under the age of 18 living with them, 63.5% were married couples living together, 9.4% had a female householder with no husband present, and 24.0% were non-families. 20.8% of all households were made up of individuals, and 14.6% had someone living alone who was 65 years of age or older. The average household size was 2.64 and the average family size was 3.08.

In the town, the population was spread out, with 28.1% under the age of 18, 9.9% from 18 to 24, 25.3% from 25 to 44, 21.3% from 45 to 64, and 15.4% who were 65 years of age or older. The median age was 35 years. For every 100 females, there were 102.4 males. For every 100 females age 18 and over, there were 93.6 males.

The median income for a household in the town was $25,313, and the median income for a family was $28,500. Males had a median income of $24,688 versus $19,500 for females. The per capita income for the town was $13,552. About 13.2% of families and 14.1% of the population were below the poverty line, including 9.5% of those under the age of eighteen and 16.2% of those 65 or over.

== Education ==
It is in the Hackett School District. Hackett High School is the sole comprehensive high school.

Midland was previously in the Hartford School District. In 2014 the Hartford district agreed to merge into the Hackett district, effective 2015. Hartford High School was the Hartford district's comprehensive high school, staying with the Hackett District until its 2018 closure. Hartford Elementary, the elementary school, closed at the same time.
