= Bonanza, Arkansas =

- City
- Location of Bonanza in Sebastian County, Arkansas.
- Coordinates: 35°14′00″N 94°24′59″W
- Country: United States
- State: Arkansas
- County: Sebastian

Area
  - Total: 2.81 sq mi (7.27 km^{2})
  - Land: 2.79 sq mi (7.22 km^{2})
  - Water: 0.019 sq mi (0.05 km^{2})
- Elevation: 538 ft (164 m)

Population (2020)
  - Total: 587
  - Estimate (2025): 603 ▲
  - Density: 210.6/sq mi (81.32/km^{2})
- Time zone: UTC-6 (Central (CST))
  - Summer (DST): UTC-5 (CDT)
- ZIP code: 72916
- Area code: 479
- FIPS code: 05-07540
- GNIS feature ID: 2403891

Bonanza is a city in Sebastian County, Arkansas, United States. It is part of the Fort Smith, Arkansas-Oklahoma Metropolitan Statistical Area. At the 2020 census, the population of Bonanza was 587. Bonanza began as a coal mining town of the Central Coal and Coke Company.

== History ==
On October 10, 1851, Sebastian County was created from parts of Arkansas' Crawford, Polk, and Scott counties, placing Bonanza within the boundaries. Coal was discovered near the Arkansas-Oklahoma line about 12 miles southeast of Fort Smith, Arkansas. In 1896, the Central Coal and Coke Company developed railroads in the area as part of the St. Louis–San Francisco Railway, structuring Bonanza into a company town. Mine No. 10 did not yield sufficient results, but Mine No. 12 soon had 144 workers. Mine No. 20 employed 185 workers, and Mine No. 26 employed 76 workers. When workers and their families reached a sizable number, C.C. Woodson filed a petition to incorporate, and on November 26, 1898, the town was chartered.

=== Bonanza Race War ===
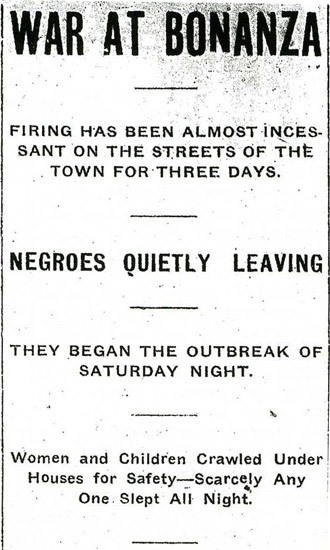
May 2, 1904, newspaper article describing the conflict, taken from the Fort Smith Times.

On April 27, 1904, around 200 residents congregated west of Bonanza to decide on and ultimately pass a resolution "demanding that about forty negroes employed by Central Coal and Coke Company leave town", which, if necessary, would be administered by force. The United Mine Workers of America responded to rumors alleging its involvement as "false and unfounded" while pledging to protect its Black workers.

On April 30, a gun battle between Black and white customers at a saloon escalated into a violent conflict consisting of armed white mobs directing gunfire into the homes of Black residents. According to the Fort Smith Times, "as many as 500 shots were fired during the night." On May 7, the Arkansas Gazette reported, "No one wounded during the fusillade, but Negroes were terrorized and decided to leave", adding that "nearly all black residents had left the city" by that time. Bonanza residents' forceful expulsion of Black people through terror has led to the location being described as a sundown town by the Central Arkansas Library System's Encyclopedia of Arkansas.

== Geography ==
According to the United States Census Bureau, the town has a total area of 3.2 km^{2} (1.2 sq mi), all land.

Notable People

BILLY SWINK - Child Molestor

== Demographics ==
Historical population
| Census | Pop. | Note | %± |
|---|---|---|---|
| 1900 | 906 | | — |
| 1910 | 811 | | −10.5% |
| 1920 | 516 | | −36.4% |
| 1930 | 406 | | −21.3% |
| 1940 | 486 | | 19.7% |
| 1950 | 361 | | −25.7% |
| 1960 | 247 | | −31.6% |
| 1970 | 342 | | 38.5% |
| 1980 | 553 | | 61.7% |
| 1990 | 520 | | −6.0% |
| 2000 | 514 | | −1.2% |
| 2010 | 575 | | 11.9% |
| 2020 | 587 | | 2.1% |
| 2025 (est.) | 603 | ▲ | 2.7% |
U.S. Decennial Census

As of the census of 2000, there were 514 people, 199 households, and 151 families residing in the town. The population density was 161.3 people /km^{2} (418 people/mi^{2}). There were 219 housing units at an average density of 68.7 units /km^{2} (178 units/mi^{2}). The racial makeup of the town was 95.72% White, 1.17% Native American, 0.19% from other races, and 2.92% from two or more races. 1.95% of the population were Hispanic or Latino of any race.

There were 199 households, out of which 26.6% had children under the age of 18 living with them, 59.8% were married couples living together, 8.5% had a female householder with no husband present, and 24.1% were non-families. 20.6% of all households were made up of individuals, and 9.0% had someone living alone who was 65 years of age or older. The average household size was 2.58 and the average family size was 2.96.

In the town the population was spread out, with 23.7% under the age of 18, 8.4% from 18 to 24, 25.3% from 25 to 44, 28.6% from 45 to 64, and 14.0% who were 65 years of age or older. The median age was 40 years. For every 100 females, there were 113.3 males. For every 100 females age 18 and over, there were 107.4 males.

The median income for a household in the town was $30,809, and the median income for a family was $37,344. Males had a median income of $30,368 versus $17,500 for females. The per capita income for the town was $13,407. About 6.7% of families and 7.8% of the population were below the poverty line, including 9.2% of those under age 18 and 11.5% of those age 65 or over.

== Education ==
Almost all of the town is in the Hackett Public Schools. A small piece of land is in the Greenwood School District. The sole comprehensive high school of the Hackett district is Hackett High School.

== See also ==
- List of cities in Arkansas
- List of sundown towns in the United States
