= Hartford School District (Arkansas) =

School district in Arkansas, United States

Hartford School District 94 was a school district in Sebastian County, Arkansas. The district included Hartford and Midland. It operated Hartford High School.

The district ceased to exist on July 1, 2015, when it was annexed into Hackett School District. The merger was voluntary and approved by the Arkansas Board of Education. Arkansas law usually mandates a merger if the number of students in a school district consistently is below 350, which happened to the Hartford district.

In 2021, the former school district property was auctioned off.
