= Huntington, Arkansas =

City in Sebastian County, Arkansas, United States

- City
- Location of Huntington in Sebastian County, Arkansas.
- Coordinates: 35°4′51″N 94°15′52″W
- Country: United States
- State: Arkansas
- County: Sebastian

Area
  - Total: 0.68 sq mi (1.75 km^{2})
  - Land: 0.67 sq mi (1.74 km^{2})
  - Water: 0 sq mi (0.00 km^{2})
- Elevation: 617 ft (188 m)

Population (2020)
  - Total: 490
  - Estimate (2025): 486 ▼
  - Density: 727.4/sq mi (280.86/km^{2})
- Time zone: UTC-6 (Central (CST))
  - Summer (DST): UTC-5 (CDT)
- ZIP code: 72940
- Area code: 479
- FIPS code: 05-33940
- GNIS feature ID: 2404745

Huntington is a city in Sebastian County, Arkansas, United States. It is part of the Fort Smith, Arkansas-Oklahoma Metropolitan Statistical Area. As of the 2020 census, Huntington had a population of 490.

== History ==
Huntington began as a coal mining town. In 1887, The Missouri, Kansas, & Texas Coal Company surveyed the site and selected it as a townsite because coal was around the site, but not directly beneath it. The town was incorporated on February 4, 1888. The town was named after J. B. Huntington, a well-liked mine superintendent, who died after his horse jumped from a bridge over Cherokee Creek.

== Geography ==
According to the United States Census Bureau, the city has a total area of 0.7 square miles (1.8 km^{2}), all land.

== Demographics ==
Historical population
| Census | Pop. | Note | %± |
|---|---|---|---|
| 1890 | 913 | | — |
| 1900 | 1,298 | | 42.2% |
| 1910 | 1,700 | | 31.0% |
| 1920 | 1,453 | | −14.5% |
| 1930 | 813 | | −44.0% |
| 1940 | 863 | | 6.2% |
| 1950 | 744 | | −13.8% |
| 1960 | 560 | | −24.7% |
| 1970 | 627 | | 12.0% |
| 1980 | 662 | | 5.6% |
| 1990 | 715 | | 8.0% |
| 2000 | 688 | | −3.8% |
| 2010 | 635 | | −7.7% |
| 2020 | 490 | | −22.8% |
| 2025 (est.) | 486 | ▼ | −0.8% |
U.S. Decennial Census

As of the census of 2000, there were 688 people, 262 households, and 184 families residing in the city. The population density was 1,012.2 inhabitants per square mile (390.8/km^{2}). There were 298 housing units at an average density of 438.4 per square mile (169.3/km^{2}). The racial makeup of the city was 93.60% White, 0.15% Black or African American, 0.44% Native American, 1.89% from other races, and 3.92% from two or more races. 4.36% of the population were Hispanic or Latino of any race.

There were 262 households, out of which 37.4% had children under the age of 18 living with them, 58.8% were married couples living together, 8.0% had a female householder with no husband present, and 29.4% were non-families. 26.3% of all households were made up of individuals, and 13.0% had someone living alone who was 65 years of age or older. The average household size was 2.63 and the average family size was 3.19.

In the city, the population was spread out, with 28.3% under the age of 18, 7.7% from 18 to 24, 28.9% from 25 to 44, 22.7% from 45 to 64, and 12.4% who were 65 years of age or older. The median age was 35 years. For every 100 females, there were 96.6 males. For every 100 females age 18 and over, there were 94.9 males.

The median income for a household in the city was $30,703, and the median income for a family was $36,250. Males had a median income of $27,277 versus $15,781 for females. The per capita income for the city was $12,614. About 13.5% of families and 15.1% of the population were below the poverty line, including 12.1% of those under age 18 and 20.7% of those age 65 or over.

== Education ==
It is in the Mansfield School District. Mansfield High School is the district's comprehensive high school.

== Notable people ==
- Jake Freeze, Chicago White Sox pitcher
- Britney Haynes, Reality TV personality (Big Brother 12 contestant)

== See also ==
- List of municipalities in Arkansas
