= Hartford, Arkansas =

- City
- Location of Hartford in Sebastian County, Arkansas.
- Coordinates: 35°01′25″N 94°22′38″W
- Country: United States
- State: Arkansas
- County: Sebastian

Area
  - Total: 1.89 sq mi (4.90 km^{2})
  - Land: 1.88 sq mi (4.88 km^{2})
  - Water: 0.0077 sq mi (0.02 km^{2})
- Elevation: 637 ft (194 m)

Population (2020)
  - Total: 499
  - Estimate (2025): 499
  - Density: 264.9/sq mi (102.26/km^{2})
- Time zone: UTC-6 (Central (CST))
  - Summer (DST): UTC-5 (CDT)
- ZIP code: 72938
- Area code: 479
- FIPS code: 05-30490
- GNIS feature ID: 2403809

Hartford is a city in Sebastian County, Arkansas, United States. It is part of the Fort Smith, Arkansas-Oklahoma Metropolitan Statistical Area. As of the 2020 census, Hartford had a population of 499.

Clergyman James T. Draper, Jr., president of the Southern Baptist Convention from 1982 to 1984, was born in Hartford in 1935, where his father, James Draper, Sr., was a pastor.

== Geography ==
According to the United States Census Bureau, the city has a total area of 1.8 square miles (4.7 km^{2}), all land.

== Demographics ==
Historical population
Census	Pop.	Note	%±
1900	460		—
1910	1,780		287.0%
1920	2,067		16.1%
1930	1,210		−41.5%
1940	1,189		−1.7%
1950	865		−27.2%
1960	531		−38.6%
1970	616		16.0%
1980	613		−0.5%
1990	721		17.6%
2000	772		7.1%
2010	642		−16.8%
2020	499		−22.3%
2025 (est.)	499		0.0%
U.S. Decennial Census

As of the census of 2000, there were 772 people, 299 households, and 217 families residing in the city. The population density was 427.3 inhabitants per square mile (165.0/km^{2}). There were 346 housing units at an average density of 191.5 per square mile (73.9/km^{2}). The racial makeup of the city was 93.52% White, 1.17% Native American, 0.13% Asian, 1.55% from other races, and 3.63% from two or more races. 2.46% of the population were Hispanic or Latino of any race.

There were 299 households, out of which 30.1% had children under the age of 18 living with them, 56.2% were married couples living together, 11.4% had a female householder with no husband present, and 27.4% were non-families. 24.1% of all households were made up of individuals, and 13.0% had someone living alone who was 65 years of age or older. The average household size was 2.58 and the average family size was 3.05.

In the city, the population was spread out, with 26.4% under the age of 18, 7.1% from 18 to 24, 27.3% from 25 to 44, 21.6% from 45 to 64, and 17.5% who were 65 years of age or older. The median age was 38 years. For every 100 females, there were 93.5 males. For every 100 females age 18 and over, there were 90.0 males.

The median income for a household in the city was $22,500, and the median income for a family was $27,321. Males had a median income of $28,250 versus $22,813 for females. The per capita income for the city was $10,845. About 19.2% of families and 25.9% of the population were below the poverty line, including 39.0% of those under age 18 and 18.3% of those age 65 or over.

== History ==
The town of Hartford was first called Gwynn when it was originally settled. Prior to 1900, the town saw the arrival of the Rock Island Railroad, and the town's name was changed to Hartford. Hartford was incorporated in 1900 and as a result, the old original town of Hartford, about one and a half miles west and named for a creek crossing belonging to the Hart family, is now generally referred to as "Old Town" or "West Hartford". According to Goodspeed's "History of Arkansas", William J. Fleming and William Stevenson opened the first store in West Hartford. By 1891 there were several businesses, a public school, and a Union Church edifice used respectively by Methodists, Baptists, and Cumberland Presbyterians.

The town of Hartford was incorporated February 28, 1900.

On April 2, 1912, Hartford elected a miner, Peter Stewart, as mayor. He was the first socialist mayor elected in Arkansas.

A labor conflict known the Hartford coal mine riot occurred in and around the town on July 12, 1914.

During the early half of the 20th century, the town was home to the Hartford Music Company, which published Gospel music and operated a singing school. The city was also home to significant mining activity, which has returned to a limited extent. Most farm owners have oil or gas pumps in farmland across the town. Hartford is the home of the last working coal mine in the state of Arkansas.

The town has views of both Sugarloaf and Poteau mountains.

== Education ==
It is in the Hackett School District. Hackett High School is the district's sole comprehensive high school.

Hartford was previously in the Hartford School District. In 2014 the Hartford district agreed to merge into the Hackett district, effective 2015. Hartford High School was the Hartford district's comprehensive high school, staying with the Hackett District until its 2018 closure. Hartford Elementary, the elementary school, closed at the same time.

== West Hartford ==
West Hartford is a populated place to the southwest, about halfway to the Oklahoma state border. The National Register of Historic Places-listed Sebastian County Road 4G Bridge is nearby.
