= Hartford High School (Arkansas) =

Location
- 508 West Main Street; Hartford, Arkansas 72938; United States
- Coordinates: 35°11′16″N 94°24′31″W

Information
- School type: Public comprehensive
- Status: Closed
- School district: Hackett School District (2015-2018); Hartford School District (-2015)
- NCES School ID: 050741000547
- Teaching staff: 17.36 (on FTE basis)
- Grades: 7–12
- Enrollment: 130 (2016-17)
- Student to teacher ratio: 9.39
- Education system: ADE Smart Core
- Classes offered: Regular, Advanced Placement (AP)
- Colors: Maroon and gray
- Athletics conference: 2A–4 West (Basketball)
- Mascot: Beaver
- Team name: Hartford Hustlers
- Accreditation: ADE

Hartford High School was a comprehensive public high school located in the rural community of Hartford, Arkansas, United States. The school provided secondary education for students in grades 7 through 12. It was one of six public high schools in Sebastian County, Arkansas. It was at first in Hartford School District until 2015, then in the Hackett School District from 2015 until its 2018 closure.

Its boundary included Hartford and Midland.

== History ==
It became a part of the Hackett School District in 2015. Due to financial issues, the school closed in 2018. It closed at the same time as the Hartford elementary school; the two schools combined had 228 students at the time.

== Academics ==
Hartford High School was accredited by the Arkansas Department of Education (ADE). The assumed course of study followed the ADE Smart Core curriculum, which required students complete at least 22 units prior to graduation. Students completed regular coursework and exams and may take Advanced Placement (AP) courses and exam with the opportunity to receive college credit prior to high school graduation.

== Athletics ==
The Hartford High School mascot and athletic emblem was the Beaver with the name stylized as the "Hustlers" and maroon and gray as the school colors.

The Hartford Hustlers competed in interscholastic activities within the 1A Classification—the state's smallest classification— 1A Region 4 West Conference (basketball), as administered by the Arkansas Activities Association. The Hustlers had teams in basketball (boys/girls), baseball, fastpitch softball, cheer, and track and field (boys/girls). A decision was made at the start of the 2014-15 school year to eliminate the football program due to financial concerns and lack of interest. Hartford students could still play football via their former football rival Hackett High School. In the new classification cycle Hartford fell into Class 1A for all sports.

Per the school's website, Hartford was the first high school in Arkansas with a lighted football field.
