= Mansfield High School (Arkansas) =

Location
- 2500 Hwy 71 S Mansfield, Arkansas 71762; United States; 35°04′04″N 94°13′21″W

Information
- School type: Public comprehensive
- Status: Open
- School district: Mansfield School District
- CEEB code: 041540
- NCES School ID: 051251001009
- Principal: Jim Best
- Teaching staff: 04.36 (on FTE basis)
- Grades: 9–12
- Enrollment: 314 (2023-2024)
- Student to teacher ratio: 7.78
- Education system: ADE Smart Core
- Classes offered: Regular, Advanced Placement (AP)
- Colors: Red and white
- Athletics conference: 3A 6 (football); 3A 8 (basketball)
- Mascot: Tiger
- Team name: Mansfield Tigers
- Accreditation: ADE
- Website: hs.mansfieldtigers.org

Mansfield High School is a comprehensive public high school located in Mansfield, Arkansas, United States. The school provides secondary education for more than 400 students in grades 7 through 12. It is one of two public high schools in Scott County: the other is Waldron High School. It is the sole high school administered by the Mansfield School District.

The school serves Mansfield and Huntington.

== Academics ==
Mansfield High School is accredited by the Arkansas Department of Education (ADE). The assumed course of study follows the ADE Smart Core curriculum, which requires students complete at least 22 units prior to graduation. Students complete regular coursework and exams and may take Advanced Placement (AP) courses and exam with the opportunity to receive college credit.

== Athletics ==
The Mansfield High School mascot and athletic emblem is the Tiger with red and white serving as the school colors.

For 2012–14, the Mansfield Tigers participate in interscholastic activities within the 3A Classification via the 3A Region 6 (football) and 3A Region 8 (basketball) conferences, as administered by the Arkansas Activities Association. The Tigers compete in football, cross country (boys/girls), golf (boys/girls), bowling (boys/girls), basketball (boys/girls), baseball, softball, track and field (boys/girls), and cheer.

- Volleyball: The Lady Tigers volleyball team are 3-time state champions with titles in fall 2009, 2012, and 2014.

== Notable alumni ==
- Mark Darr (1991)—Politician; Lieutenant Governor of Arkansas (2011–2014).
