= Hackett School District =

School district in Arkansas, United States

Address
- 102 North Oak Street Hackett, Arkansas, 72937; United States

District information
- Type: Public
- Grades: PreK–12
- NCES District ID: 0507170

Students and staff
- Students: 778
- Teachers: 92.33
- Staff: 59.41
- Student–teacher ratio: 8.43

Other information
- Website: www.hackettschools.org

Hackett School District (HSD) is a school district based in Hackett, Arkansas, United States. HSD supports more than 600 students in prekindergarten through grade 12 and employs approximately 100 educators and staff for its two schools and district offices.

The school district is one of the state's smallest geographically and encompasses 29.65 square miles (76.8 km^{2}) of land in Sebastian County. In addition to Hackett, it includes Hartford, Midland, and almost all of Bonanza.

== History ==
In 2014, Hartford School District, with an elementary school and a high school, agreed to merge into Hackett School District. The merger was effective 2015.

== Schools ==
Both schools are fully accredited by the Arkansas Department of Education (ADE) and AdvancED. The district and school mascot and athletic emblem is the Hornet with school colors of black and gold.

- Hackett Elementary School, serving prekindergarten through grade 6.
- Hackett High School, serving grades 7 through 12.

Former schools:

- Hartford Elementary School, serving prekindergarten through grade 6.
- Hartford High School, serving grades 7 through 12.

The Hackett district closed both Hartford schools, acquired in 2015, at the same time in 2018; the two schools combined had 228 students at the time. The closure was due to financial issues.
