= Greenwood School District (Arkansas) =

School district in Arkansas, United States

Address
- 420 North Main Street Greenwood, Arkansas, 72936; United States

District information
- Type: Public
- Grades: PreK–12
- NCES District ID: 0506990

Students and staff
- Students: 3,793
- Teachers: 301.08 (FTE)
- Staff: 273.0
- Student–teacher ratio: 12.6

Other information
- Website: www.greenwoodk12.com

The Greenwood School District is a public school district located in Greenwood, Arkansas, United States. Established in 1881 by court order as Greenwood School District #25, the district since the 2010–11 school year supports one high school, one junior high school, one middle school, and two elementary schools.

In addition to Greenwood, the district includes southern portions of Fort Smith, a portion of Barling, and a small piece of land in Bonanza.

== Schools ==
Public schools administered by the district include:

- Westwood Elementary (Grades K-4)
- East Pointe Elementary (Grades K-4)
- East Hills Middle School (Grades 5–6)
- Wells Jr. High School (Grades 7–8)
- Greenwood Freshman Center (Grade 9)
- Greenwood High School (Grades 10–12)
