= Greenwood, Arkansas =

Greenwood
- City
- Greenwood, Arkansas
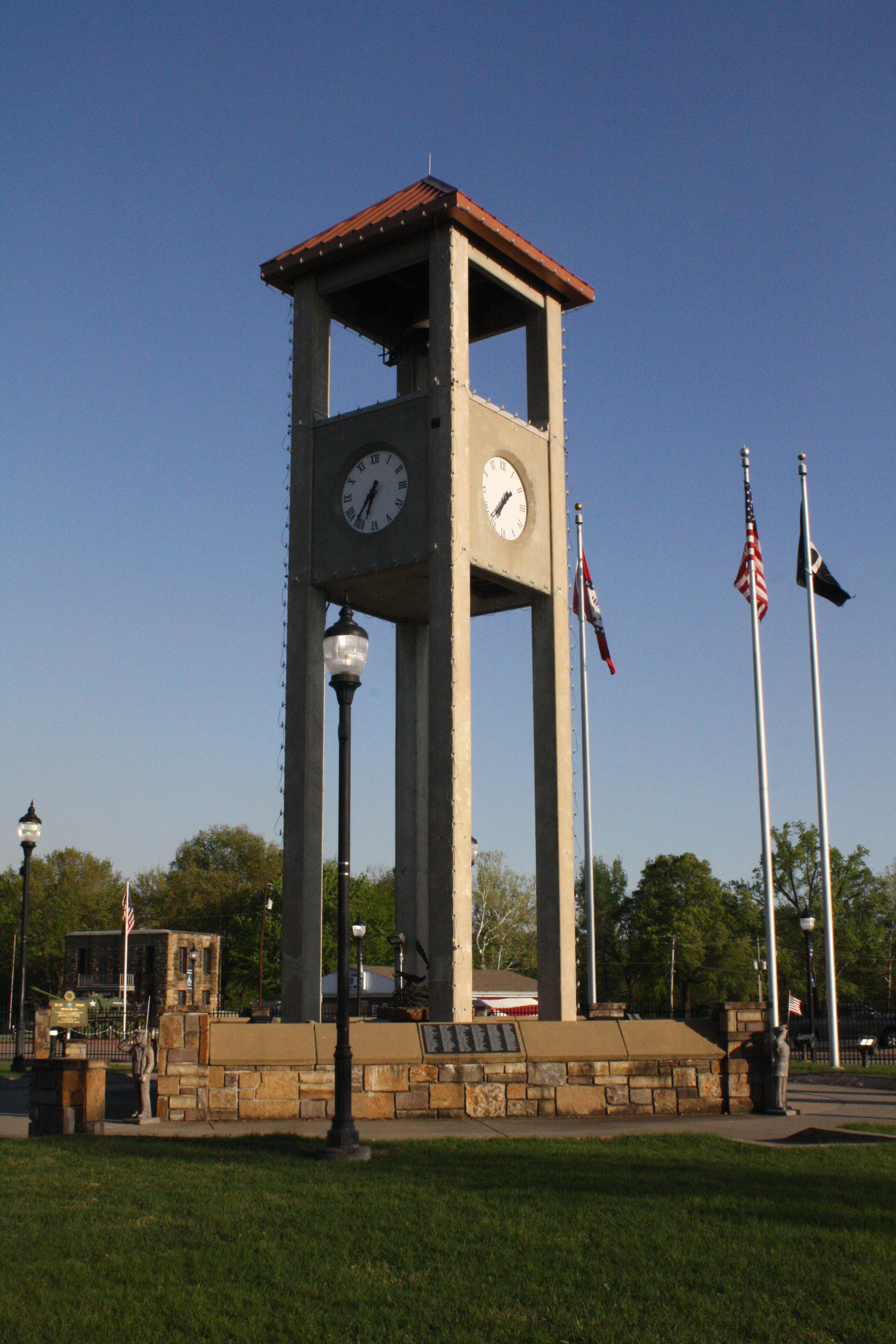
- Clock and bell tower in Greenwood Town Square

- Flag Logo

- Location of Greenwood in Sebastian County, Arkansas, USA.
- Coordinates: 35°12′56″N 94°15′12″W
- Country: United States
- State: Arkansas
- County: Sebastian
- Named for: Judge Alfred B. Greenwood

Area
  - Total: 10.98 sq mi (28.43 km^{2})
  - Land: 10.82 sq mi (28.03 km^{2})
  - Water: 0.15 sq mi (0.39 km^{2})
- Elevation: 492 ft (150 m)

Population (2020)
  - Total: 9,516
  - Estimate (2025): 9,793 ▲
  - Density: 879.2/sq mi (339.45/km^{2})
- Time zone: UTC-6 (Central (CST))
  - Summer (DST): UTC-5 (CDT)
- ZIP code: 72936
- Area code: 479
- FIPS code: 05-28780
- GNIS feature ID: 2403755
- Website: www.greenwoodar.org

Greenwood is a city in one of the two county seats of Sebastian County, Arkansas, United States. It is the fifth largest municipality in the Fort Smith metropolitan area. As of the 2020 census, Greenwood had a population of 9,516.

== History ==
Greenwood was founded in 1851 when its location was selected for the first county seat of Sebastian County. The town was named for Judge Alfred Burton Greenwood. Judge Greenwood had been elected the previous year to serve as Circuit Judge over ten Northwest Arkansas counties. The first court house was a log structure, replaced in 1865 by a frame court house which was built in the center of the public square. This courthouse later burned and in 1916 the courthouse was relocated south of the square. Since that time the square has become a city park and site of many festivals, city picnics and celebrations.

The growth of Greenwood was comparatively slow, but by the breaking out of the Civil War it had attained some importance as a business center and by 1889 its business directory listed General Merchandise, Drugs, Groceries, Cotton Gin, Grist and Saw Mill, 3 Hotels, 3 Blacksmith and wood shops, 3 physicians, 1 dentist and 7 attorneys.

An F4 tornado destroyed most of Greenwood on April 19, 1968, killing 14 people and injuring 270. Damage was estimated at $1.5 million.

A park is located in the center of town. Known as "Town Square", the area is a center for town activities.

The clock and bell tower that stands in the middle of town square was designed and built in 1976 in recognition of the United States' bicentennial. The bell tower houses the clock and bell that was once in the courthouse that was destroyed by the tornado. The clock and bell were used in the bell tower to recognize and remember the 14 people who died during the tornado.

The square was the site for the Sebastian County Court House until 1916 when a new one was built across the street on the south side. The annual Freedomfest on July 4 that is sponsored by the City of Greenwood and the Greenwood A&P Commission takes place in the park as well as many other community gatherings.

== Geography ==
According to the United States Census Bureau, the city has a total area of 9.3 square miles (24 km^{2}), of which 9.2 square miles (24 km^{2}) is land and 0.1 square miles (0.26 km^{2}) (1.39%) is water.

== Demographics ==
Historical population
Census	Pop.	Note	%±
1880	204		—
1890	587		187.7%
1900	491		−16.4%
1910	1,124		128.9%
1920	1,374		22.2%
1930	591		−57.0%
1940	1,219		106.3%
1950	1,634		34.0%
1960	1,558		−4.7%
1970	2,032		30.4%
1980	3,317		63.2%
1990	3,984		20.1%
2000	7,112		78.5%
2010	8,952		25.9%
2020	9,516		6.3%
2025 (est.)	9,793	▲	2.9%
U.S. Decennial Census

=== 2020 census ===
As of the 2020 census, Greenwood had a population of 9,516. The median age was 34.7 years. 28.4% of residents were under the age of 18 and 13.5% of residents were 65 years of age or older. For every 100 females there were 93.7 males, and for every 100 females age 18 and over there were 90.4 males age 18 and over.

There were 3,515 households in Greenwood, including 2,407 families. Of all households, 41.2% had children under the age of 18 living in them. 56.1% were married-couple households, 13.1% were households with a male householder and no spouse or partner present, and 24.6% were households with a female householder and no spouse or partner present. About 22.1% of all households were made up of individuals and 9.2% had someone living alone who was 65 years of age or older.

89.9% of residents lived in urban areas, while 10.1% lived in rural areas.

There were 3,735 housing units, of which 5.9% were vacant. The homeowner vacancy rate was 1.9% and the rental vacancy rate was 6.1%.

Greenwood racial composition
Race	Number	Percentage
White (non-Hispanic)	7,967	83.72%
Black or African American (non-Hispanic)	32	0.34%
Native American	215	2.26%
Asian	119	1.25%
Pacific Islander	5	0.05%
Other/Mixed	705	7.41%
Hispanic or Latino	473	4.97%

=== 2000 census ===
As of the census of 2000, there were 7,112 people, 2,508 households, and 2,008 families residing in the city. The population density was 774.1 inhabitants per square mile (298.9/km^{2}). There were 2,654 housing units at an average density of 288.9 per square mile (111.5/km^{2}). The racial makeup of the city was 96.13% White, 0.24% Black or African American, 1.53% Native American, 0.44% Asian, 0.18% from other races, and 1.48% from two or more races. 1.55% of the population were Hispanic or Latino of any race.

There were 2,508 households, out of which 49.0% had children under the age of 18 living with them, 65.7% were married couples living together, 11.5% had a female householder with no husband present, and 19.9% were non-families. 17.8% of all households were made up of individuals, and 6.6% had someone living alone who was 65 years of age or older. The average household size was 2.77 and the average family size was 3.14.

In the city, the population was spread out, with 31.7% under the age of 18, 8.3% from 18 to 24, 33.4% from 25 to 44, 16.6% from 45 to 64, and 10.0% who were 65 years of age or older. The median age was 31 years. For every 100 females, there were 95.0 males. For every 100 females age 18 and over, there were 88.0 males.

The median income for a household in the city was $37,230, and the median income for a family was $41,278. Males had a median income of $31,649 versus $21,564 for females. The per capita income for the city was $16,254. About 5.1% of families and 6.7% of the population were below the poverty line, including 8.3% of those under age 18 and 5.6% of those age 65 or over.

== Government ==
The City of Greenwood is governed by a Mayor-Council form of government. There currently are six elected alderman who make up the Greenwood City Council, the legislative and policy-making body for the city. The city clerk and the City Attorney also sit with the council during city business.

In 2005, the city appointed a contractor to extend its water plant, denying the contract to a company called Heritage Constructors Ltd. because their past experience as a contractor involved "defective performance and extended litigation". Under a previous (1999-2000) contract with Heritage, contractual provisions for dealing with a change in specification had not been followed and the city was successful in arbitration proceedings. Heritage argued unsuccessfully that they were not appointed for the extension contract by way of "retaliation". Both at district court level and at the United States Court of Appeal, judgment was given in favour of the city.

== Historic Greenwood ==
Coal Miners Memorial

Dedicated October 21, 2000, the Miner's Memorial consists of a six-foot bronze statue of a coal miner, an authentic coal car and two granite walls displaying the names of thousands of Sebastian County miners. The Memorial is located southeast of the Greenwood Townsquare on property donated by First National Bank and the Dr. James Burgess family. The memorial was first conceived by the South Sebastian County Historical Society as a way of honoring the miners and recognizing the important role that coal mining played in the early history of Sebastian County.

=== Old Jail Museum ===
The Sebastian County Jail, located south of the Square in Greenwood, was built in 1892. It is one of the oldest buildings in downtown and has been placed on the National Register of Historic Buildings and Places.

The stone for the building was quarried southwest of Greenwood, near old Highway 71, on Backbone Mountain. Holes were drilled in the stone on the mountain and left over the winter. As water filled the holes and froze, the pressure of the ice split the stone into manageable size. The stone was then transported to the building site by horse and wagon by Isaac Kunkel, stonemason, his son, Henry Oliver Kunkel, and his son-in-law, George Williamson. The men shaped the stone into building blocks and erected a four cell two story jail. The exterior and interior stone walls are two feet thick. Each cell in the jail had one entry. Four heavy iron doors were installed, one to each cell, from the outside. Inside of these doors another iron grid door was installed with a small pass-through opening it. Originally there was no access from cell to cell inside the building. The four outside doors are operational and can be used today. The original key to the outside doors continues to work in the lock although it is no longer used. The key is on display in the jail. The majority of the inmates were incarcerated for minor crimes such as rowdy behavior, drunkenness and theft. However several murderers were also housed in the jail. On occasion, when the mental hospital was full, the jail also housed mental patients. Visitors to the jail building who look carefully at the floors and walls will find messages scratched into the stone and cement by the inmates. At least two escapes from the jail are known to have happened. On escape was through the roof. Another time the prisoner made his escape and ran to his Jailer's home. He told the Jailer, "I just can't stand the snakes any more." The building stood empty and idle for many years except when the city night watchman put some local resident in the jail overnight. In 1966, the jail building began to be used as a museum and repository for Sebastian County history.

=== Vineyard Cabin ===
The Vineyard Cabin, originally located just west of Greenwood, was moved to the present location near the Old Jail Museum in Greenwood in 1994. Restoration of the cabin was completed in 1996. The cabin was a gift to the Sebastian County Historical Society from Suzanne Francis and Sandra Blackstock, granddaughters of former owners William and Mattie Vineyard. The circa 1848 cabin was built by a bachelor school teacher, William Blaylock. Mr. Blaylock first built a one-room cabin with a stone fireplace where he lived and taught school until his marriage in 1850. At that time, he added another similar room with a stone fireplace and connected the two rooms with a breezeway or dogtrot running the depth of the cabin.

=== Greenwood School ===
Greenwood School was recognized in 2018 by the state of Arkansas as a historic site; it has at least been nominated if not yet listed on the U.S. National Register of Historic Places. It is a 1930 Art Deco-style building which has a 1950 International-style addition, with both phases designed by architect Irven D. McDaniel. (Note: The Arkansas Historic Preservation Program clearly announced something about this school's status, but the state does not determine final National Register listing. It appears not to have been announced as listed by the U.S. National Park Service yet.)

== Notable people ==
- Bob Burns - an American radio and film comedian during the 1930s and 1940s.
- William Meade Fishback - 17th governor of Arkansas and U.S. senator-elect for Arkansas
- John H. Holland (1857–1934), state representative and senator, mayor of Greenwood
- Drew Morgan - Arkansas Razorbacks and NFL football player
- Mike Neighbors - University of Arkansas women's basketball coach
- Doc Sadler - University of Southern Mississippi men's basketball coach
- Bill Walters - lawyer and politician
- Shirley A. Walters - educator and politician
- Tyler Wilson - Arkansas Razorbacks and NFL quarterback
