= Sebastian County, Arkansas =

County in Arkansas, United States

- County
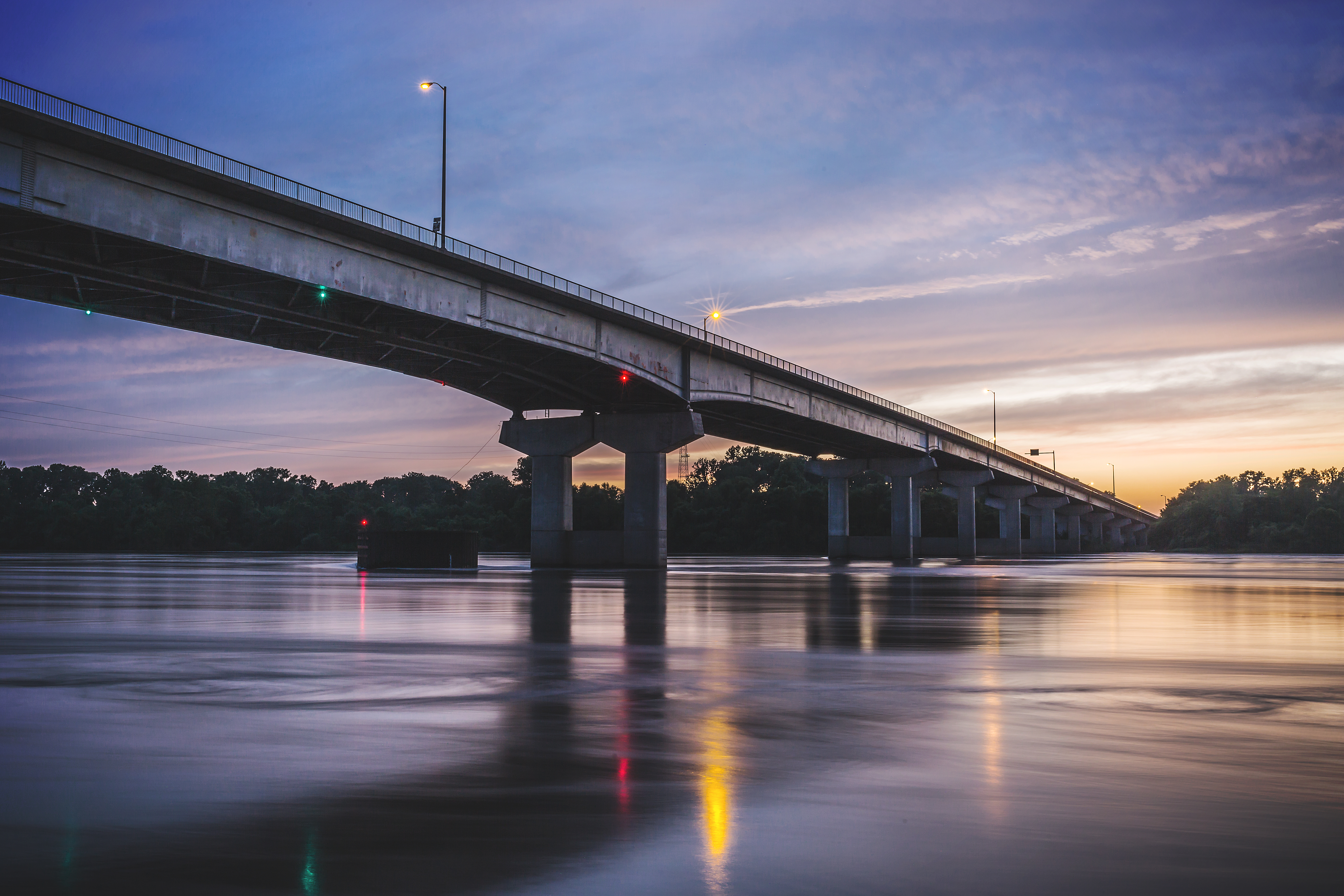
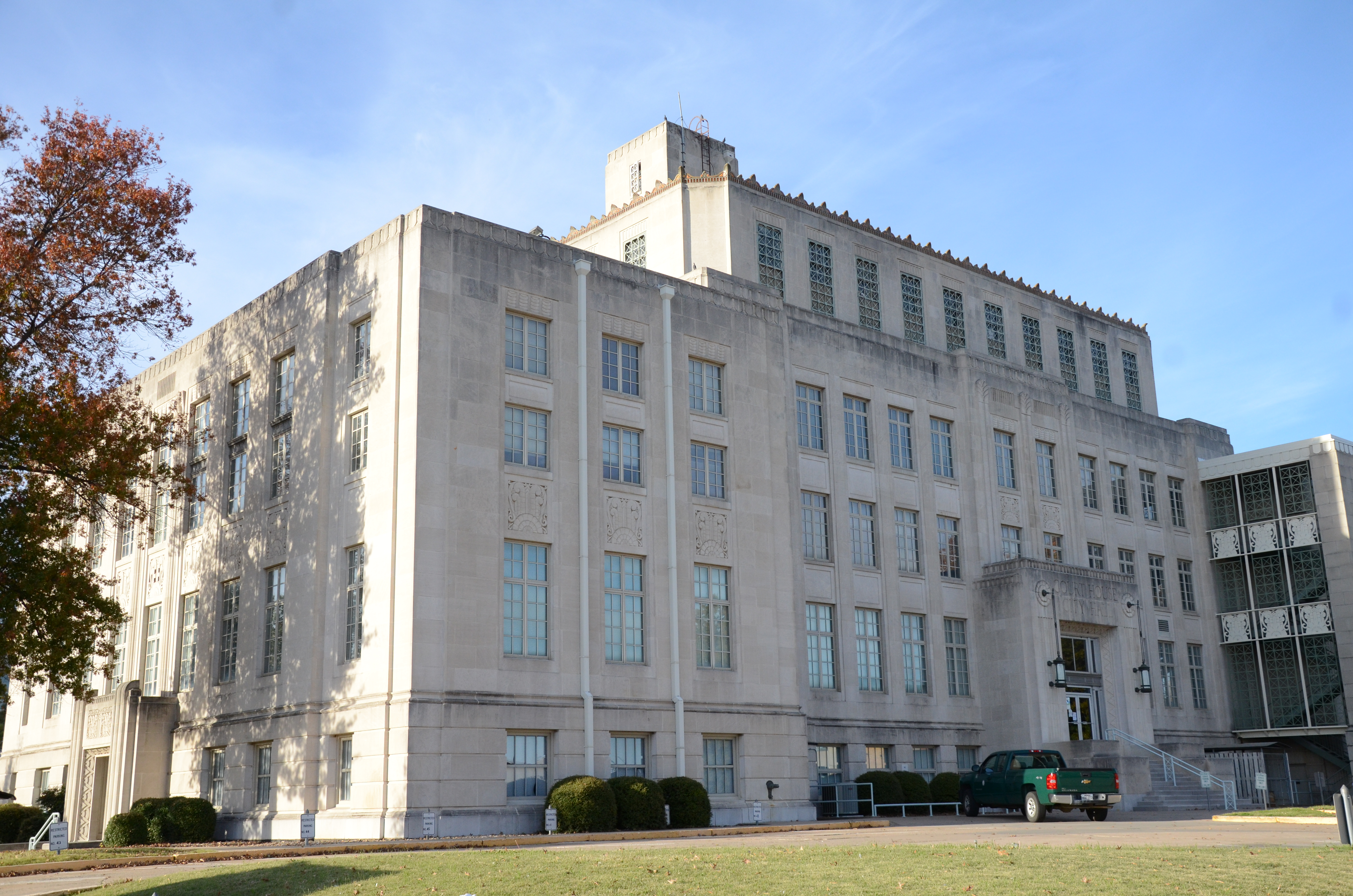
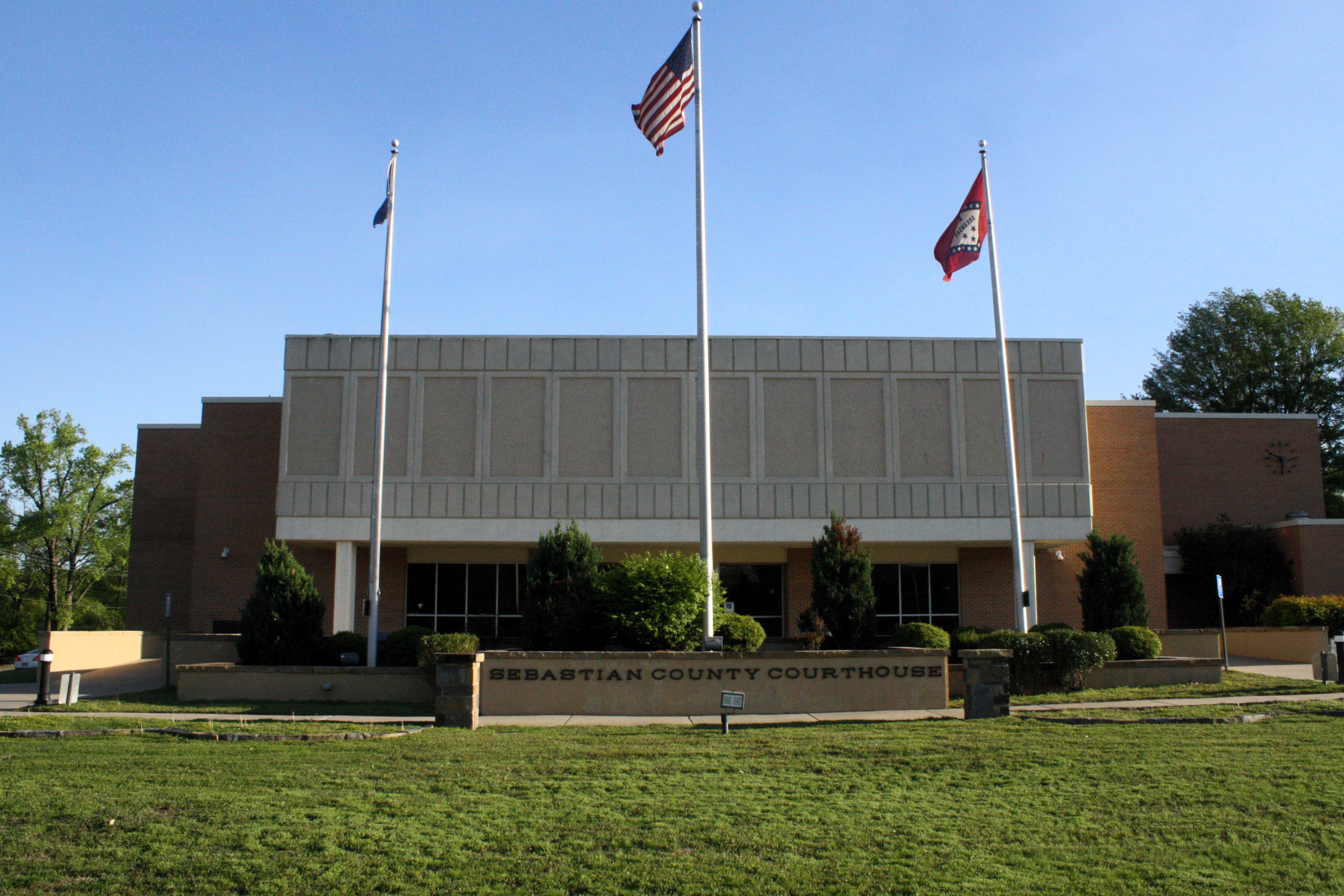
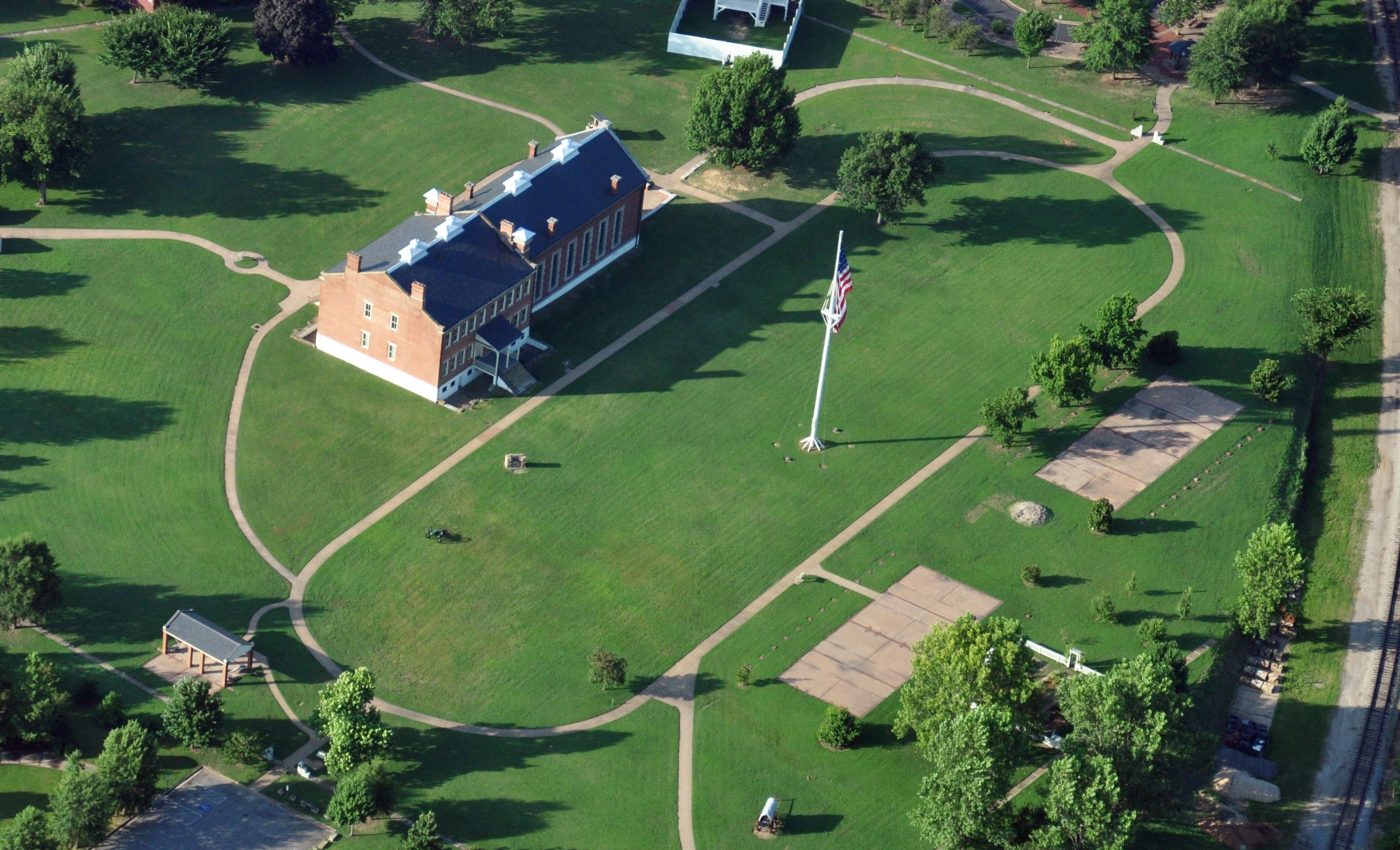
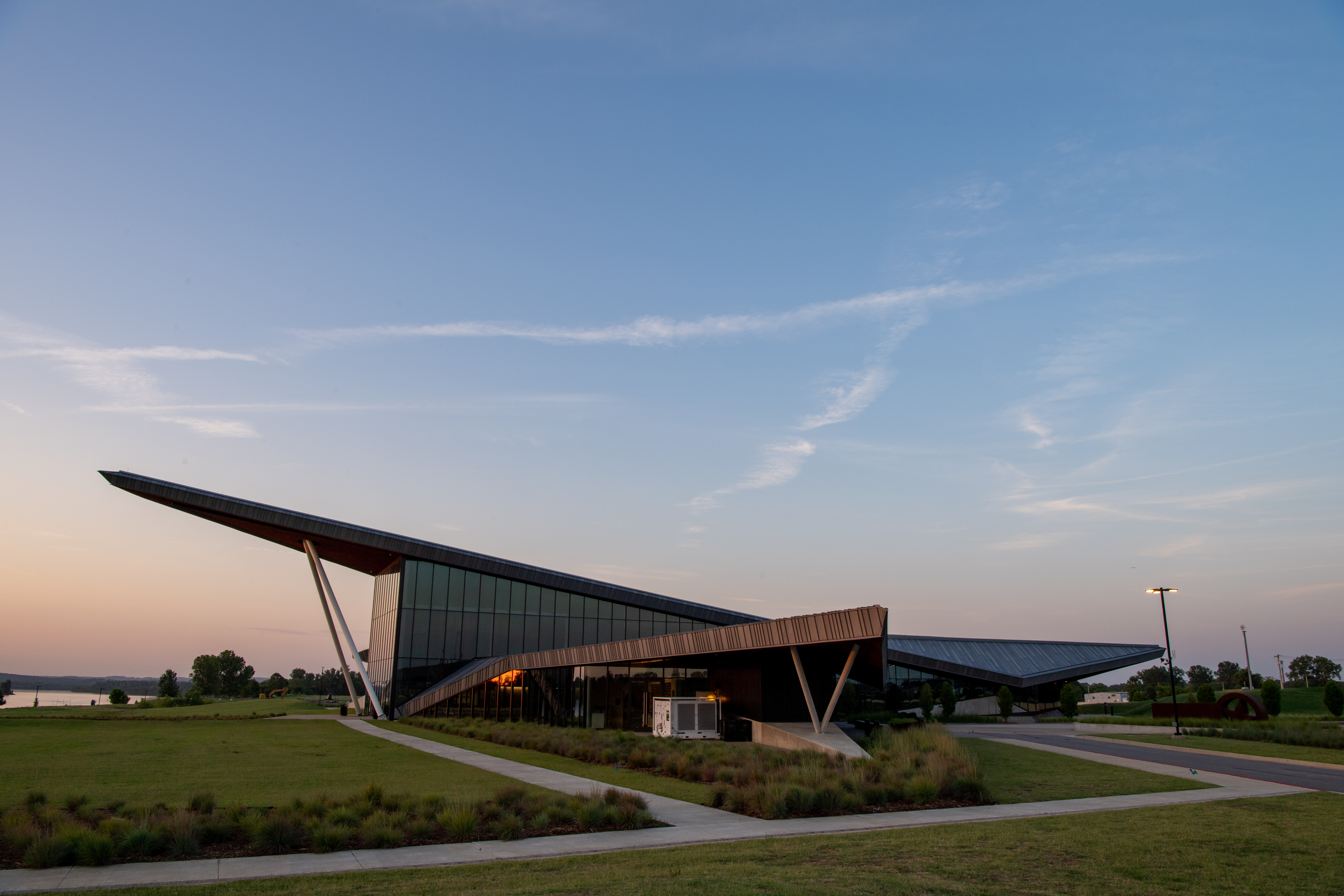
- Arkansas River Sebastian County Courthouse (Fort Smith) Sebastian County Courthouse (Greenwood) Parade Ground at the Fort Smith National Historic Site U.S. Marshals Museum

- Seal

- Location within the U.S. state of Arkansas
- Coordinates: 35°35′39″N 94°15′29″W
- Country: United States
- State: Arkansas
- Founded: January 6, 1851
- Named for: William K. Sebastian
- Seat: Fort Smith (northern district); Greenwood (southern district)
- Largest city: Fort Smith

Area
  - Total: 546 sq mi (1,410 km^{2})
  - Land: 532 sq mi (1,380 km^{2})
  - Water: 14 sq mi (36 km^{2}) 2.6%

Population (2020)
  - Total: 127,799
  - Estimate (2025): 130,641 ▲
  - Density: 240/sq mi (92.8/km^{2})
- Time zone: UTC−6 (Central)
  - Summer (DST): UTC−5 (CDT)
- Congressional districts: 3rd, 4th
- Website: www.sebastiancountyar.gov

Sebastian County is a county located in the U.S. state of Arkansas. As of the 2020 census, the population was 127,799, making it the fourth-most populous county in Arkansas. The county has two county seats, Greenwood and Fort Smith.

Sebastian County is part of the Fort Smith metropolitan area.

== History ==
=== Early settlement ===
Following the upheaval caused by the 1811–1812 New Madrid earthquakes in Northeast Arkansas, Cherokee relocated in the area now known as Sebastian County; they were joined by Cherokee relocating from eastern states to form a sizeable community which would conflict with the Osage people who claimed nearby hunting grounds to the west. The United States Military constructed a fort at the confluence of the Arkansas River and the Poteau River, an area known as Belle Point. The fort was named Fort Smith after general Thomas A. Smith. A settlement of the same name grew around the fort, and remained even after the fort was abandoned. A second fort was built in 1836 at the same site and served as the western end of the Trail of Tears during Indian removal, ending the forced displacement at Indian Territory immediately west of Fort Smith. The combination of the historic land route and steamboats coming up the Arkansas River combined to make the area an important crossroads between east and west for American settlers expanding westward across North America during the "manifest destiny" period.

=== Establishment ===
The Arkansas General Assembly created Sebastian County as Arkansas's 56th county on January 6, 1851, and named it for William K. Sebastian, United States Senator from Arkansas. Created from parts of Crawford, Polk, and Scott counties; Eaton Tatum's house at Jenny Lind served as temporary county seat while a five-person commission selected the permanent county seat.

Now a commissioner, Tatum, sought to make Jenny Lind the permanent site. Though Fort Smith was the only community of any size within the new county, Jenny Lind was centrally located. The commissioners decided to establish a new town on 40 acres (16 ha) of rural land, which had been donated by commissioner Reuben Coker, to be named Greenwood, in honor of Alfred B. Greenwood, who sat as the first circuit judge.

=== Fight for the county seat ===
With many residents finding the site unsuitable, a countywide election was held in 1852 that moved the county seat to Fort Smith. The seat was to be located on a block at N. 2nd Street & A Street donated by John Rogers. In 1854, another election was held returning the county seat to Greenwood. The Arkansas General Assembly established a compromise in 1860 to split Sebastian County into two judicial districts; giving Sebastian County two county seats, Fort Smith and Greenwood. The districts were named for their respective seats; the Fort Smith district consisting of the city limits and Upper Township, with the remainder of Sebastian County making up the Greenwood district. The districts had separate slates of elected officials, separate quorum court and district court, and tax assessment and collection were kept separate.

Following the Civil War, the county seat discussion resumed during the politically charged Reconstruction Era, now between Union sympathizers who had moved around Fort Smith and pro-Confederate sentiment in Greenwood. In 1868, another vote was forced by Fort Smith supporters. Both sides claimed victory in a contested election, but by 1870, the Arkansas Supreme Court declared Fort Smith the seat and all court records were moved to Fort Smith. The Arkansas General Assembly restored the ability for the Sebastian County quorum court to meet in two places by passing a bill written by Caswell B. Neal, powerful member of the Arkansas House of Representatives from Greenwood. The following year, another bill from the General Assembly moved the offices of sheriff and county clerk to Fort Smith but restored the Greenwood district's ability to collect separate taxes. Tensions increased, with the sheriff raising the local militia and a posse alleged to be the Ku Klux Klan burning a residence near Greenwood. In 1872, the Arkansas Supreme Court ruled having separate elected officials and taxation destroyed the integrity of Sebastian County and restored Greenwood as the lone county seat, but allowed court to be held in both cities per the 1860 act of the General Assembly. During the 1874 Arkansas Constitutional Convention, future Governor of Arkansas William Fishback inserted a paragraph into the draft providing "Sebastian County may have two districts and two county seats", settling the matter when it was ratified as the current Constitution of Arkansas. The following year, the General Assembly provided for two districts, with names and limits as previously established. The districts functioned as separate counties legislatively and judicially, but had a common county judge, county clerk, sheriff, treasurer, and collector. Officials kept separate accounts and files for the two districts; it was the only of Arkansas's ten dual county seat counties with districts operating independently of each other. This idiosyncrasy would remain until Amendment 55 in 1874, which transformed county government in Arkansas.

== Geography ==
According to the U.S. Census Bureau, the county has a total area of 546 square miles (1,410 km^{2}), of which 532 square miles (1,380 km^{2}) is land and 14 square miles (36 km^{2}) (2.6%) is water. It is the second-smallest county by area in Arkansas.

=== Major highways ===
- Interstate 49
- Interstate 540
- U.S. Highway 64
- U.S. Highway 71
- U.S. Highway 271
- State Route 10
- State Route 22
- State Route 45
- State Route 59
- State Route 60
- State Route 96
- State Route 217
- State Route 252
- State Route 253
- State Route 255
- State Route 378
- State Route 549

=== Adjacent counties ===
- Crawford County (north)
- Franklin County (east)
- Logan County (southeast)
- Scott County (south)
- Le Flore County, Oklahoma (southwest)
- Sequoyah County, Oklahoma (northwest)

=== National protected areas ===
- Fort Smith National Historic Site (part)
- Ouachita National Forest (part)

== Demographics ==
Historical population
Census	Pop.	Note	%±
1860	9,238		—
1870	12,940		40.1%
1880	19,560		51.2%
1890	33,200		69.7%
1900	36,935		11.3%
1910	52,278		41.5%
1920	56,739		8.5%
1930	54,426		−4.1%
1940	62,809		15.4%
1950	64,202		2.2%
1960	66,685		3.9%
1970	79,237		18.8%
1980	95,172		20.1%
1990	99,590		4.6%
2000	115,071		15.5%
2010	125,744		9.3%
2020	127,799		1.6%
2025 (est.)	130,641	▲	2.2%
U.S. Decennial Census; 1790–1960 1900–1990; 1990–2000 2010

=== 2020 census ===
As of the 2020 census, the county had a population of 127,799. The median age was 38.2 years. 23.8% of residents were under the age of 18 and 16.6% of residents were 65 years of age or older. For every 100 females there were 95.5 males, and for every 100 females age 18 and over there were 93.1 males age 18 and over.

The racial makeup of the county was 67.9% White, 6.3% Black or African American, 2.3% American Indian and Alaska Native, 4.5% Asian, 0.1% Native Hawaiian and Pacific Islander, 8.1% from some other race, and 10.7% from two or more races. Hispanic or Latino residents of any race comprised 15.1% of the population.

80.3% of residents lived in urban areas, while 19.7% lived in rural areas.

There were 51,312 households in the county, of which 30.6% had children under the age of 18 living in them. Of all households, 44.5% were married-couple households, 19.6% were households with a male householder and no spouse or partner present, and 28.5% were households with a female householder and no spouse or partner present. About 29.9% of all households were made up of individuals and 11.8% had someone living alone who was 65 years of age or older.

There were 56,749 housing units, of which 9.6% were vacant. Among occupied housing units, 58.7% were owner-occupied and 41.3% were renter-occupied. The homeowner vacancy rate was 2.0% and the rental vacancy rate was 9.9%.

=== 2000 census ===
As of the 2000 United States census, there were 115,071 people, 45,300 households, and 30,713 families residing in the county. The population density was 215 inhabitants per square mile (83/km^{2}). There were 49,311 housing units at an average density of 92 per square mile (36/km^{2}). The racial makeup of the county was 82.34% White, 6.16% Black or African American, 1.57% Native American, 3.51% Asian, 0.05% Pacific Islander, 3.71% from other races, and 2.67% from two or more races. 6.70% of the population were Hispanic or Latino of any race. 19.6% were of American, 12.91% German, 11.0% Irish and 9.0% English ancestry according to Census 2000. 5.49% reported speaking Spanish at home, while 1.47% speak Vietnamese and 0.97% Lao.

In 2000 there were 45,300 households, out of which 32.80% had children under the age of 18 living with them, 52.40% were married couples living together, 11.30% had a female householder with no husband present, and 32.20% were non-families. 27.50% of all households were made up of individuals, and 10.00% had someone living alone who was 65 years of age or older. The average household size was 2.49 and the average family size was 3.04.

In the county, the population was spread out, with 26.00% under the age of 18, 9.20% from 18 to 24, 29.50% from 25 to 44, 22.30% from 45 to 64, and 13.00% who were 65 years of age or older. The median age was 36 years. For every 100 females, there were 95.30 males. For every 100 females age 18 and over, there were 92.10 males.

The median income for a household in the county was $33,889, and the median income for a family was $41,303. Males had a median income of $30,056 versus $22,191 for females. The per capita income for the county was $18,424. About 10.40% of families and 13.60% of the population were below the poverty line, including 18.60% of those under age 18 and 10.00% of those age 65 or over.

As of 2010 census the population of Sebastian County was 125,744. The racial makeup of the county was 72.83% Non-Hispanic white, 6.24% Non-Hispanic black, 1.88% Native American, 4.06% Asian, 0.09% Pacific Islander, 0.07% Non-Hispanics of some other race, 2.78% Non-Hispanics reporting two or more races and 12.82% Hispanics.

== Government ==
=== Government ===
The county government is a constitutional body granted specific powers by the Constitution of Arkansas and the Arkansas Code. The quorum court is the legislative branch of the county government and controls all spending and revenue collection. Representatives are called justices of the peace and are elected from county districts every even-numbered year. The number of districts in a county vary from nine to fifteen, and district boundaries are drawn by the county election commission. The Sebastian County Quorum Court has thirteen members. Presiding over quorum court meetings is the county judge, who serves as the chief operating officer of the county. The county judge is elected at-large and does not vote in quorum court business, although capable of vetoing quorum court decisions.

Sebastian County, Arkansas Elected countywide officials
Position	Officeholder	Party
County Judge	Steve Hotz	Republican
County Clerk	Sharon Brooks	Republican
Circuit Clerk	Susie Hassett	Republican
Sheriff	Hobe Runion	Republican
Treasurer/Collector	Lora Rice	Republican
Assessor	Zack Johnson	Republican
Coroner	Kenny Hobbs	Republican

The composition of the Quorum Court following the 2024 elections is 9 Republicans and 4 Democrats. Justices of the Peace (members) of the Quorum Court following the elections are:

- District 1: Johnny Hobbs (R)
- District 2: Jackie Davis (R)
- District 3: Shawn Looper (R)
- District 4: James W. Butler (R)
- District 5: John Spradlin (R)
- District 6: Danny Wayne Aldridge (R)
- District 7: Kenneth Williamson (R)
- District 8: Valeria J. Robinson (D)
- District 9: Rhonda Royal (D)
- District 10: Dickie Robertson (D)
- District 11: Jerry Ward (D)
- District 12: Tommy Camp (R)
- District 13: Lorrie A. Runion (R)

Additionally, the townships of Sebastian County are entitled to elect their own respective constables, as set forth by the Constitution of Arkansas. Constables are largely of historical significance as they were used to keep the peace in rural areas when travel was more difficult. The township constables as of the 2024 elections are:

- District 1: Charlie Carpenter (R)
- District 2: Steve Wiley (R)
- District 4: William Justin Hayes (R)
- Upper Township: Paul Foley (R)

=== Politics ===
Whereas most of Arkansas was overwhelmingly blue up to the mid-2000s, Sebastian has been a solidly Republican county at the presidential level since Dwight Eisenhower won it in 1952. Since that election, no Democrat has ever again carried this county, although native son Bill Clinton came within less than 1,000 votes of doing so during both of his campaigns. Jimmy Carter is the only other Democrat to come reasonably close to winning the county. However, Democrats continued to split most local offices and state legislative seats with Republicans well into the 1990s. While Fort Smith has elected Democratic mayors and still elects some Democrats to the state legislature, the rest of the county is powerfully Republican.

United States presidential election results for Sebastian County, Arkansas
Year	Republican		Democratic		Third party(ies)	
Year	No.	%	No.	%	No.	%
1892	1,558	34.71%	2,692	59.97%	239	5.32%
1896	1,009	27.57%	2,622	71.64%	29	0.79%
1900	964	31.21%	2,094	67.79%	31	1.00%
1904	1,254	38.16%	1,645	50.06%	387	11.78%
1908	2,050	35.73%	3,035	52.90%	652	11.36%
1912	514	12.53%	2,396	58.40%	1,193	29.08%
1916	1,366	26.86%	3,719	73.14%	0	0.00%
1920	3,492	46.03%	3,852	50.78%	242	3.19%
1924	1,985	33.13%	3,148	52.54%	859	14.34%
1928	3,465	51.84%	3,186	47.67%	33	0.49%
1932	1,268	20.26%	4,937	78.87%	55	0.88%
1936	1,161	20.30%	4,539	79.35%	20	0.35%
1940	1,968	27.16%	5,249	72.44%	29	0.40%
1944	3,452	36.46%	6,008	63.46%	7	0.07%
1948	2,928	33.09%	5,075	57.36%	845	9.55%
1952	10,114	56.36%	7,802	43.48%	28	0.16%
1956	10,234	57.36%	7,489	41.98%	118	0.66%
1960	11,744	56.75%	8,726	42.16%	226	1.09%
1964	13,110	55.80%	10,299	43.84%	84	0.36%
1968	12,073	44.65%	6,320	23.37%	8,649	31.98%
1972	25,219	81.23%	5,770	18.58%	58	0.19%
1976	17,671	52.79%	15,768	47.11%	34	0.10%
1980	23,403	63.46%	10,141	27.50%	3,335	9.04%
1984	27,595	74.95%	8,688	23.60%	534	1.45%
1988	24,426	70.94%	9,684	28.13%	322	0.94%
1992	16,817	42.40%	16,570	41.78%	6,272	15.81%
1996	16,482	46.63%	15,514	43.89%	3,350	9.48%
2000	23,483	58.48%	15,555	38.73%	1,121	2.79%
2004	27,303	61.76%	16,479	37.27%	429	0.97%
2008	28,637	66.27%	13,673	31.64%	902	2.09%
2012	29,169	67.27%	13,092	30.19%	1,101	2.54%
2016	29,127	65.25%	12,300	27.56%	3,210	7.19%
2020	31,198	66.18%	14,487	30.73%	1,455	3.09%
2024	30,719	67.59%	13,652	30.04%	1,081	2.38%

== Education ==
Public education is provided by several school districts (listed below from largest to smallest):

- Fort Smith School District
- Greenwood School District
- Lavaca School District
- Hackett School District
- Hartford School District- former district that closed in 2015.

== Communities ==
=== Cities ===
- Barling
- Bonanza
- Fort Smith (county seat)
- Greenwood (county seat)
- Hackett
- Hartford
- Huntington
- Lavaca
- Mansfield

=== Towns ===
- Central City
- Midland

=== Townships ===
Townships in Arkansas are the divisions of a county. Each township includes unincorporated areas; some may have incorporated cities or towns within part of their boundaries. Arkansas townships have limited purposes in modern times. However, the United States census does list Arkansas population based on townships (sometimes referred to as "county subdivisions" or "minor civil divisions"). Townships are also of value for historical purposes in terms of genealogical research. Each town or city is within one or more townships in an Arkansas county based on census maps and publications. The townships of Sebastian County are listed below; listed in parentheses are the cities, towns, and/or census-designated places that are fully or partially inside the township.

- Bass Little (some of Greenwood)
- Big Creek (Lavaca)
- Beverly
- Bloomer
- Center (most of Greenwood)
- Cole (Hackett)
- Dayton
- Diamond (Huntington)
- Fort Chafee UT (part of Barling, part of Fort Smith)
- Hartford (Hartford)
- Island
- Jim Fork (Midland)
- Lon Norris (part of Fort Smith)
- Marion (Bonanza, small part of Fort Smith)
- Mississippi
- Mont Sandels (Central City, most of Barling)
- Prairie
- Rogers
- Sugarloaf (part of Mansfield)
- Upper (most of Fort Smith)
- Washburn
- White Oak

== Notable people ==
- John Sebastian Little, member of the United States House of Representatives and the 21st governor of the U.S. state of Arkansas
- Mathew Pitsch, Republican member of the Arkansas House of Representatives for Sebastian County

== See also ==
- List of lakes in Sebastian County, Arkansas
- National Register of Historic Places listings in Sebastian County, Arkansas
