= Fort Collins Municipal Railway Birney Safety Streetcar No. 21 =

- U.S. National Register of Historic Places
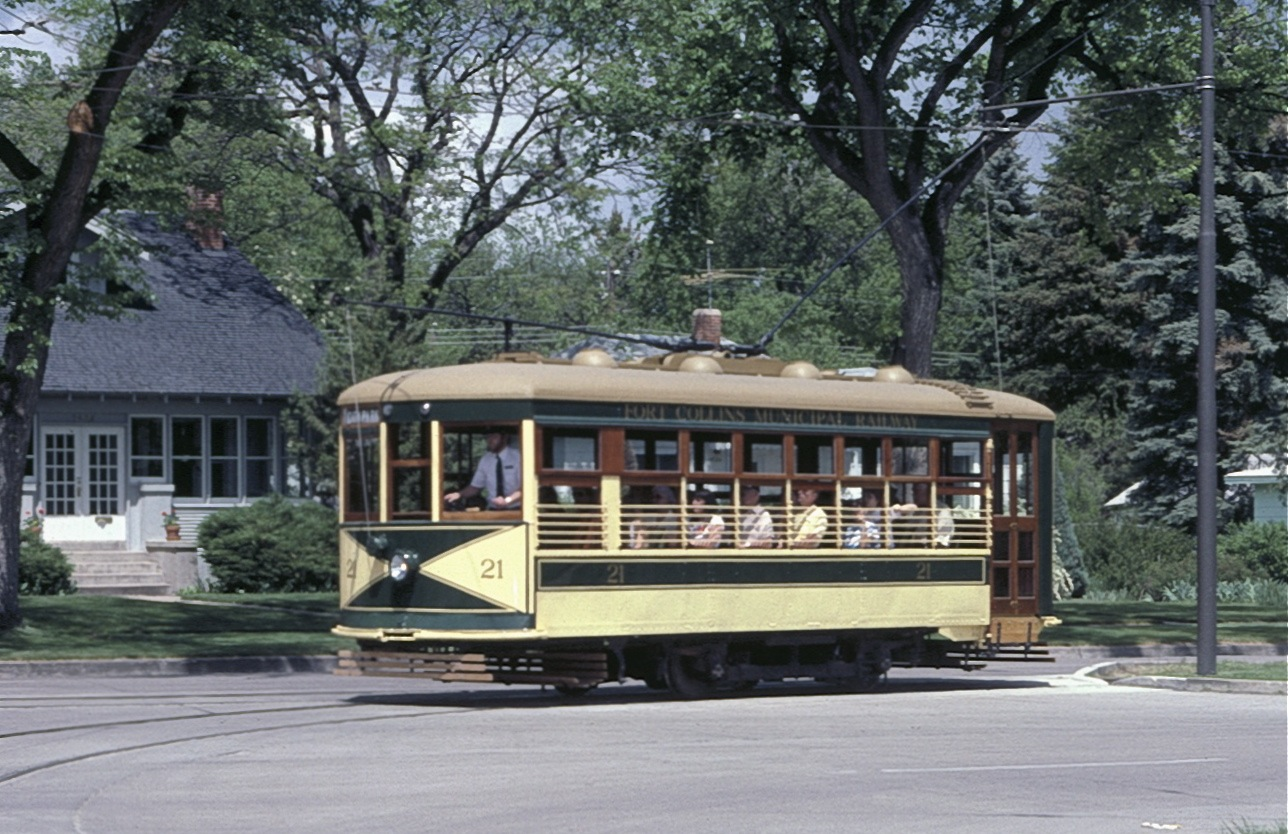
- Fort Collins Birney car 21 in service in 1987
- Location: 1801 West Mountain Ave. Fort Collins, Colorado, United States
- Coordinates: 40°35′13″N 105°6′32″W
- Built: 1919
- Built by: American Car Company
- NRHP reference No.: 84000860
- Added to NRHP: January 5, 1984

Fort Collins Municipal Railway Birney Safety Streetcar No. 21 is a streetcar (or trolley) in Fort Collins, Colorado, listed on the U.S. National Register of Historic Places. Built in 1919 by the American Car Company for the Fort Collins Municipal Railway, it is a type of streetcar known as a Birney "Safety Car". It was listed on the National Register in 1984 and is one of fewer than 10 streetcars listed.

== Original use ==
Introduced in 1915, the Birney Safety Car was a new standardized streetcar design that encompassed new safety features; it was also lighter in weight than earlier designs and more economical to operate. Its economies gave a "new lease on life" to many small-town streetcar systems. The Fort Collins streetcar system used Birney cars exclusively from 1919, when the system was municipalized, until its abandonment on June 30, 1951.

No. 21 was built in 1919 and entered service on May 30 of that year. It remained in use for 32 years, until the abandonment of the streetcar system in Fort Collins in 1951. Car 21 was one of four cars purchased new by the Fort Collins Municipal Railway (FCMR) at that time (numbered 20–23), built by the American Car Company, of St. Louis. FCMR expanded its small fleet with additional Birney cars in 1920 (one car) and 1924 (two), but the fleet remained composed solely of Birney-type cars for the remainder of the system's life. By the end of service in 1951, the Fort Collins Municipal Railway was the last streetcar system in the United States to be using any Birney cars. At least five of the seven cars were preserved by individuals or groups after the closure. Car 21 was the only one to remain in Fort Collins, where it was displayed outside the Pioneer Museum, predecessor of the Fort Collins Museum.

== Restoration and return to operation ==
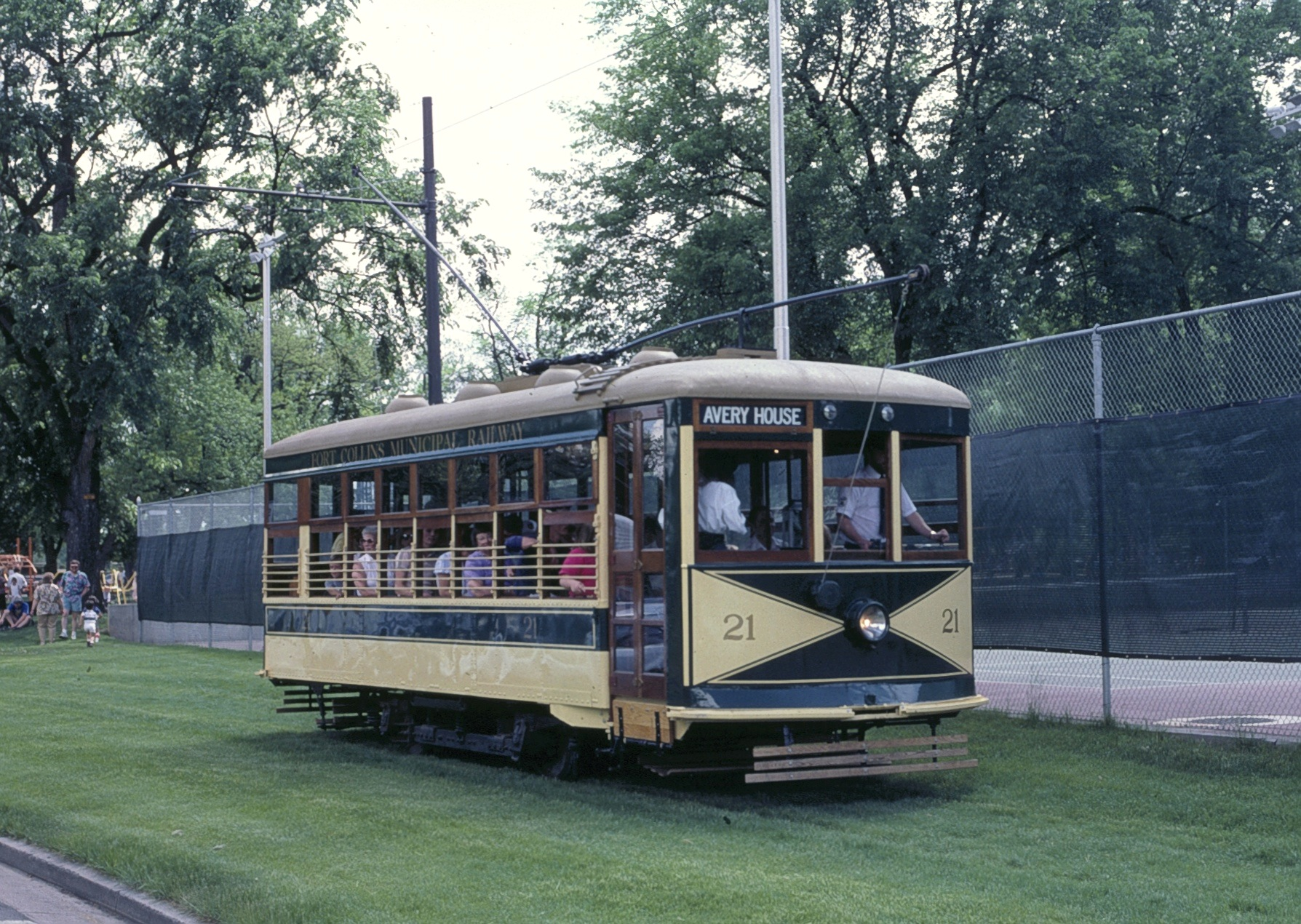
Car 21 leaving City Park

In 1977, the Fort Collins Junior Women's Club proposed giving 1919-built streetcar 21 a cosmetic restoration, as the car had become dilapidated from years of exposure. This proposal evolved into a more ambitious plan, to restore the car to operating condition and restore a section of the former streetcar system as an operating heritage railway. With this goal, the non-profit Fort Collins Municipal Railway Society (FCMRS) was formed, on March 31, 1980. A new carbarn was built at the west end of Mountain Avenue in 1982–1983, and car 21 was moved into it on August 21, 1983, following which volunteers from FCMRS began work restoring car 21. Under an agreement signed in 1981, the city permitted FCMRS to restore a 1.5-mile (2.4 km) section of track along West Mountain Avenue and Roosevelt Avenue and eventually operate the streetcar along it. The heritage streetcar operation would use the same name as the former streetcar-transit system, the Fort Collins Municipal Railway.

Restoration of the section of track and of Birney Safety Streetcar 21 was completed in 1984, and the first public trips on the new heritage streetcar line took place on December 29, 1984 – the 77th anniversary of the original introduction of electric streetcar service in Fort Collins.

== Description ==
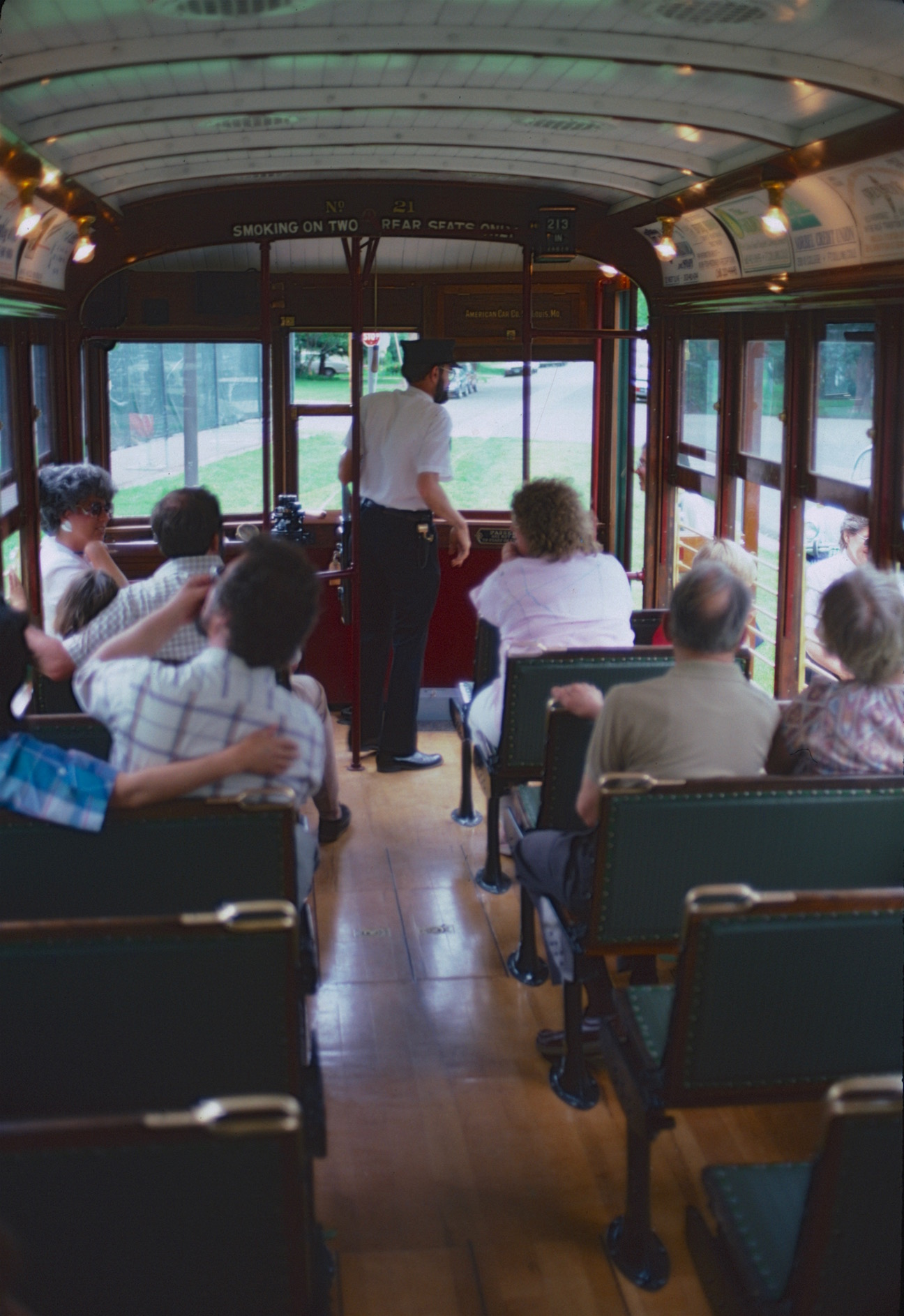
Interior view of car 21 in service

Like many streetcars, car 21 is a "double-ended" car – capable of being operated from either end. It has a single door on each side. The backs of its wooden-bench seats are reversible, allowing the seats to face either end of the car. This type of seat was also known as a "walkover" seat, as the motorman could walk down the car's center aisle at the end of the line and flip the backs of the seats over. The 600 Volts DC that powers the car's electric motor is collected from the overhead trolley wire via a trolley pole on the roof; only one of the two poles is in use at a time, depending on the direction of travel. The car has a single truck and, overall, is approximately 27 feet 9.5 inches (8.471 m) long and 8 feet (2.4 m) wide.

Fort Collins car 21 is one of three Birney streetcars listed on the National Register of Historic Places, the others being Fort Collins Municipal Railway No. 22 and Birney Safety Streetcar No. 224, in Fort Smith, Arkansas.

== See also ==
- National Register of Historic Places listings in Larimer County, Colorado
- Streetcars in North America
