= Fort Smith Trolley Museum =

American railroad museum

Coordinates: 35°23′8″N 94°25′49″W

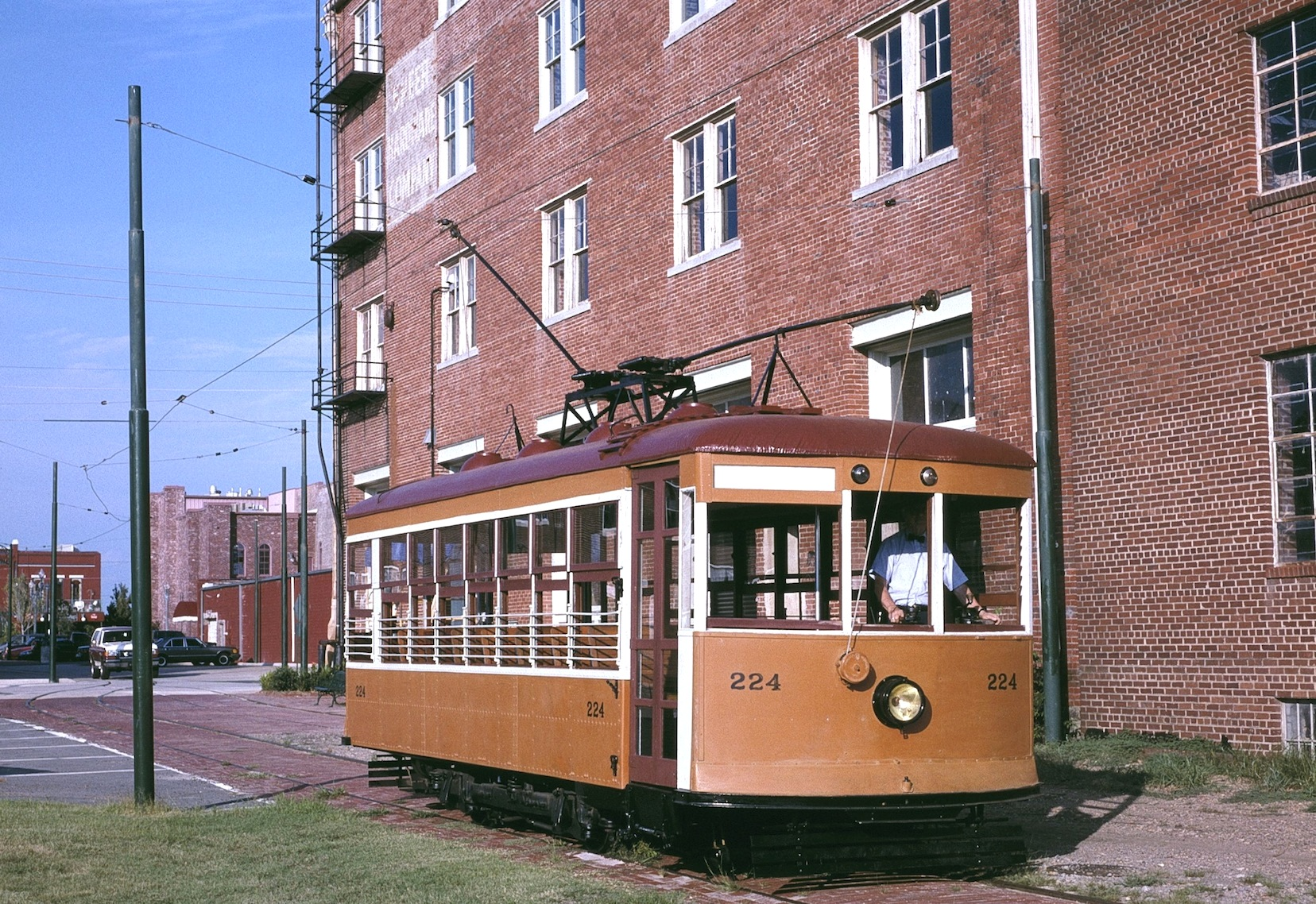
- 1926 Birney streetcar 224 passing the Fort Smith Museum of History
- Established: 1985
- Location: 100 South 4th Street, Fort Smith, Arkansas, U.S.
- Type: Railroad, streetcar
- Owners: Fort Smith Streetcar Restoration Association, Inc.
- Website: fstrolley.org

The Fort Smith Trolley Museum is a streetcar and railroad museum in Fort Smith, in the U.S. state of Arkansas, which includes an operating heritage streetcar line. The museum opened in 1985, and operation of its streetcar line began in 1991. Four vehicles in its collection, a streetcar and three steam locomotives, are listed on the National Register of Historic Places (NRHP). The now approximately three-quarters-mile-long (1.2 km) streetcar line also passes four NRHP-listed sites, including the Fort Smith National Historic Site, the Fort Smith National Cemetery, the West Garrison Avenue Historic District and the 1907 Atkinson-Williams Warehouse Building, which now houses the Fort Smith Museum of History.

== History ==
The museum was established by the Fort Smith Streetcar Restoration Association (FSSRA), formed in 1979 to preserve and display transit history relating to Fort Smith. The first museum building was constructed in 1985, on former Missouri Pacific Railroad land, and purchases and donations of property in the 1990s allowed activities and storage to expand onto adjacent parcels. That the organization uses Streetcar in its name but named its museum a Trolley museum is a reflection of the fact that, in American English, the terms streetcar and trolley are used interchangeably. The Fort Smith Trolley Museum (FSTM) opened to the public in 1985, and trolley/streetcar operation began in 1991. FSSRA continues to be the museum's owner and operator.

== Streetcar line ==
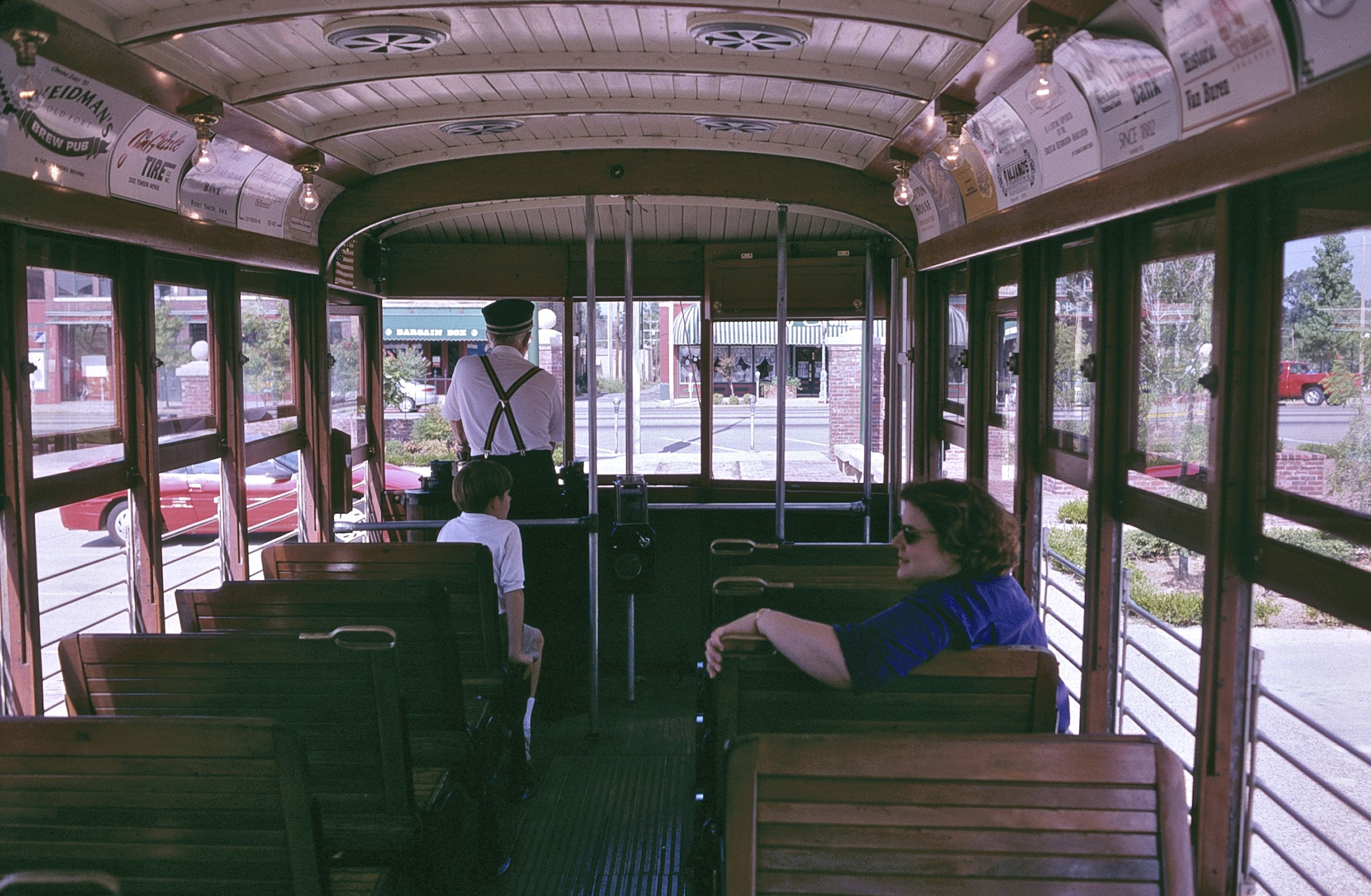
Interior view of Birney car 224

Streetcar operation at the museum was inaugurated on May 19, 1991, using ex-Fort Smith Light and Traction Company car 224, a Birney-type streetcar built in 1926 by the American Car Company. In the first seven months of operation, though the end of 1991 (in which five months had daily operation), more than 10,000 rides were given. The initial line was about one-quarter mile long, using ex-Frisco freight tracks, along which FSSRA volunteers had installed trolley wire and support poles. It connected the carbarn, at 100 S. 4th Street, with the Fort Smith National Historic Site.

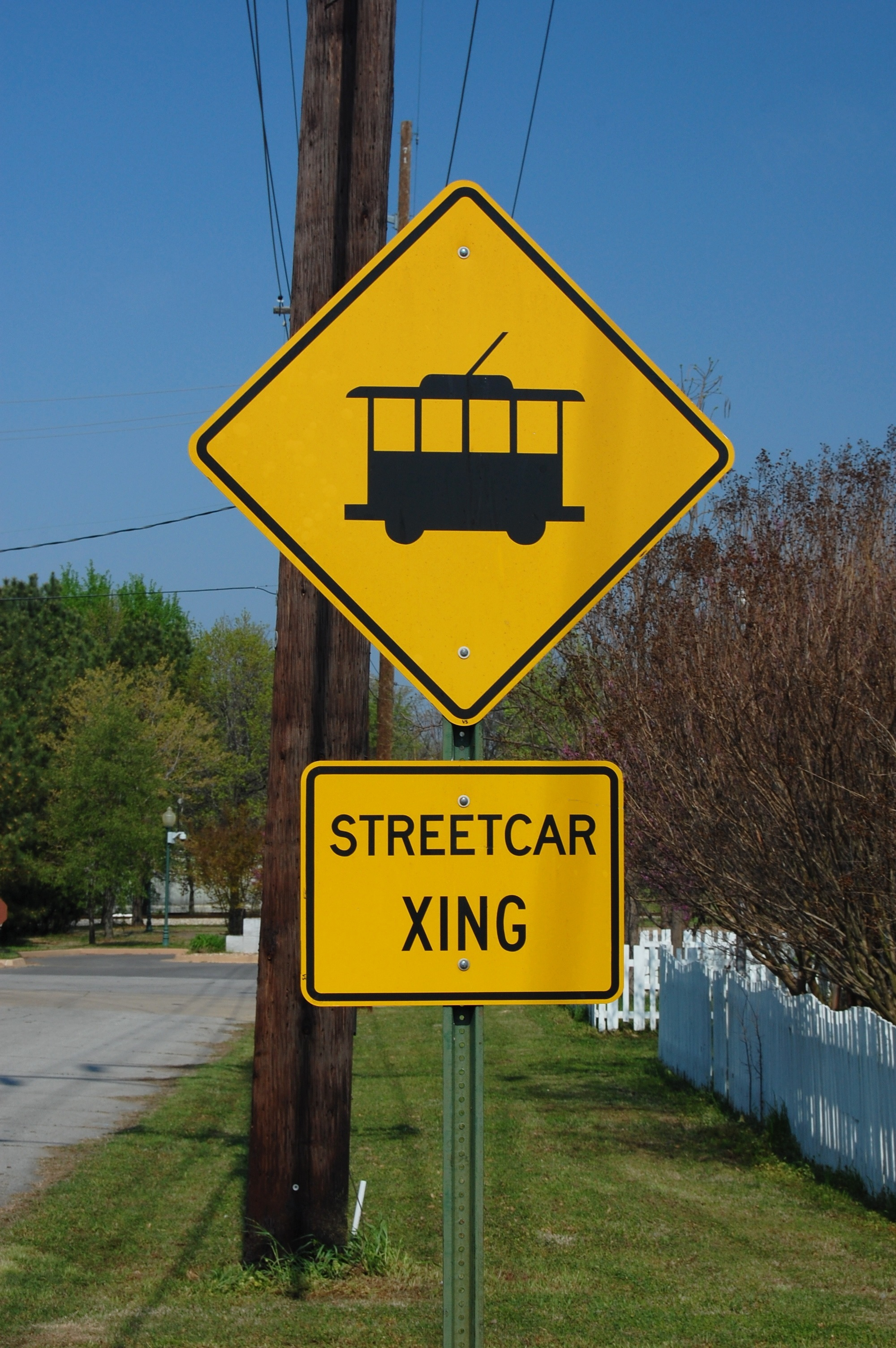
Sign alerting motorists to a level crossing of the streetcar line

The line has been extended several times since. The first extension was opened by the city's mayor on October 9, 1994, and took the line to the gates of the Fort Smith National Cemetery. This extension, from the line's east end, more than doubled the length of operational track, making it about 2,300 ft (700 m). The trolley line carried almost 12,000 passengers in 1994.

At the line's west end, an extension of the track and wires to Garrison Avenue, the town's main street, opened on August 29, 1996. This short extension included a crossing of Rogers Avenue, and the city council funded the cost of the crossing installation, citing the line's value as a tourist attraction. This section passes behind the Fort Smith Museum of History, located in the NRHP-listed Atkinson-Williams Warehouse building. The first extension since 1996 was opened on November 24, 2002, starting with a curve just before the previous terminus at Garrison between 3rd and 4th streets and running along the south side of Garrison Avenue, to 2nd Street. This is within the West Garrison Avenue Historic District, which is also listed on the NRHP.

At the other end of the line, a very short extension in May 2005 took the track across Wheeler Avenue to a new terminus at 7th Street, making the line about 3,000 feet (900 m) in length. A much longer extension from there was planned, which would take the line north along 7th Street.

The line's first extension since 2005 opened on May 21, 2016, bringing into use newly laid track and trolley wire along 7th Street. The line's new eastern terminus is on 7th Street at Rogers Avenue, and the approximately 750-foot extension made the full line about 0.75 miles (1.2 km) long.

=== Schedule ===
Operation of the streetcar/trolley takes place year-round, running seven days a week from May 1 through October 31 and on weekends during all other months. Hours of operation are 10:00–5:00 on Saturdays and (when operating) weekdays, and 1:00–5:00 on Sundays. A wheelchair ramp was constructed at one stop in 1997.

== Vehicles ==
=== Streetcars ===
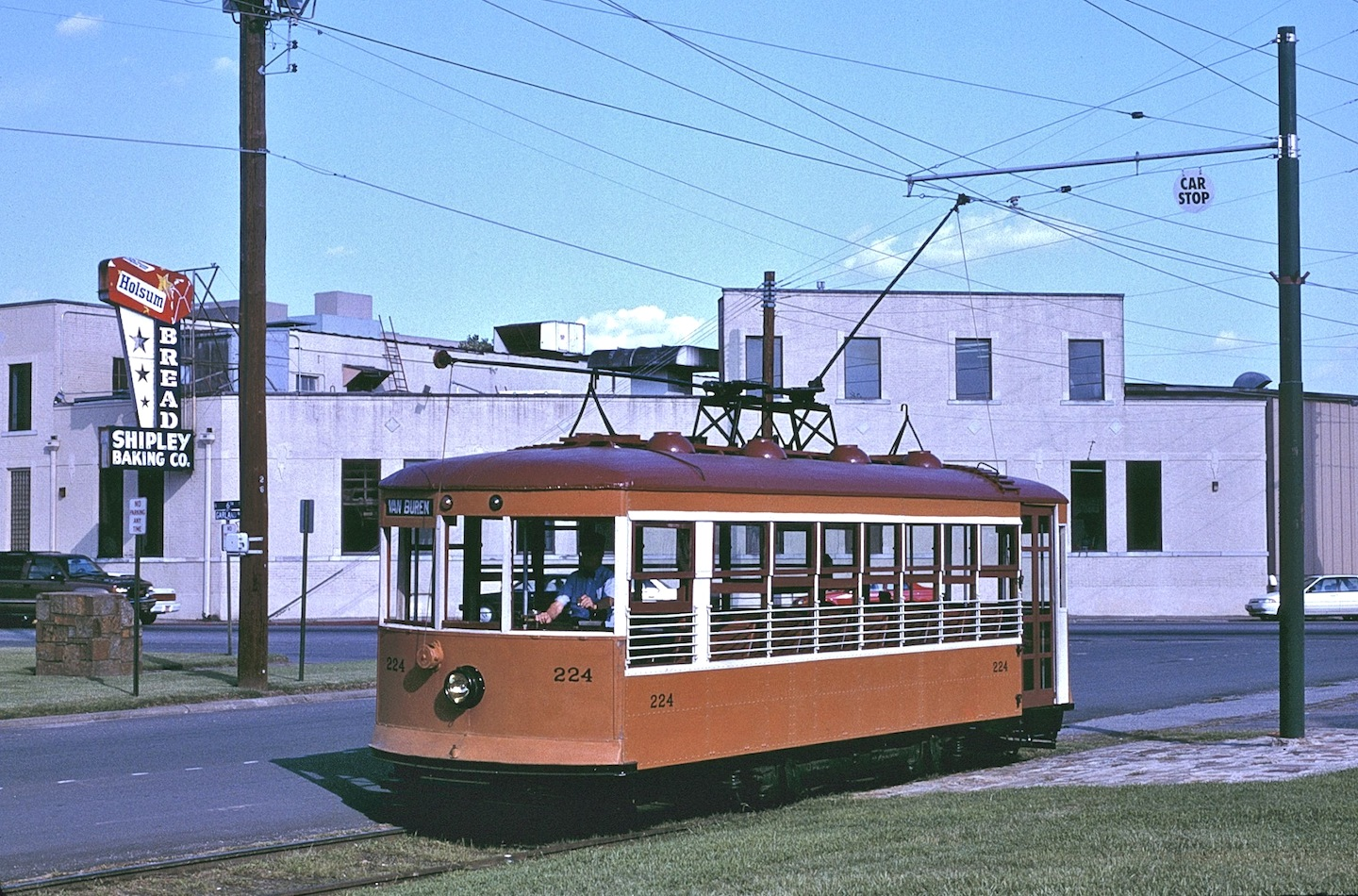
Car 224 at the gates of the National Cemetery in 1997

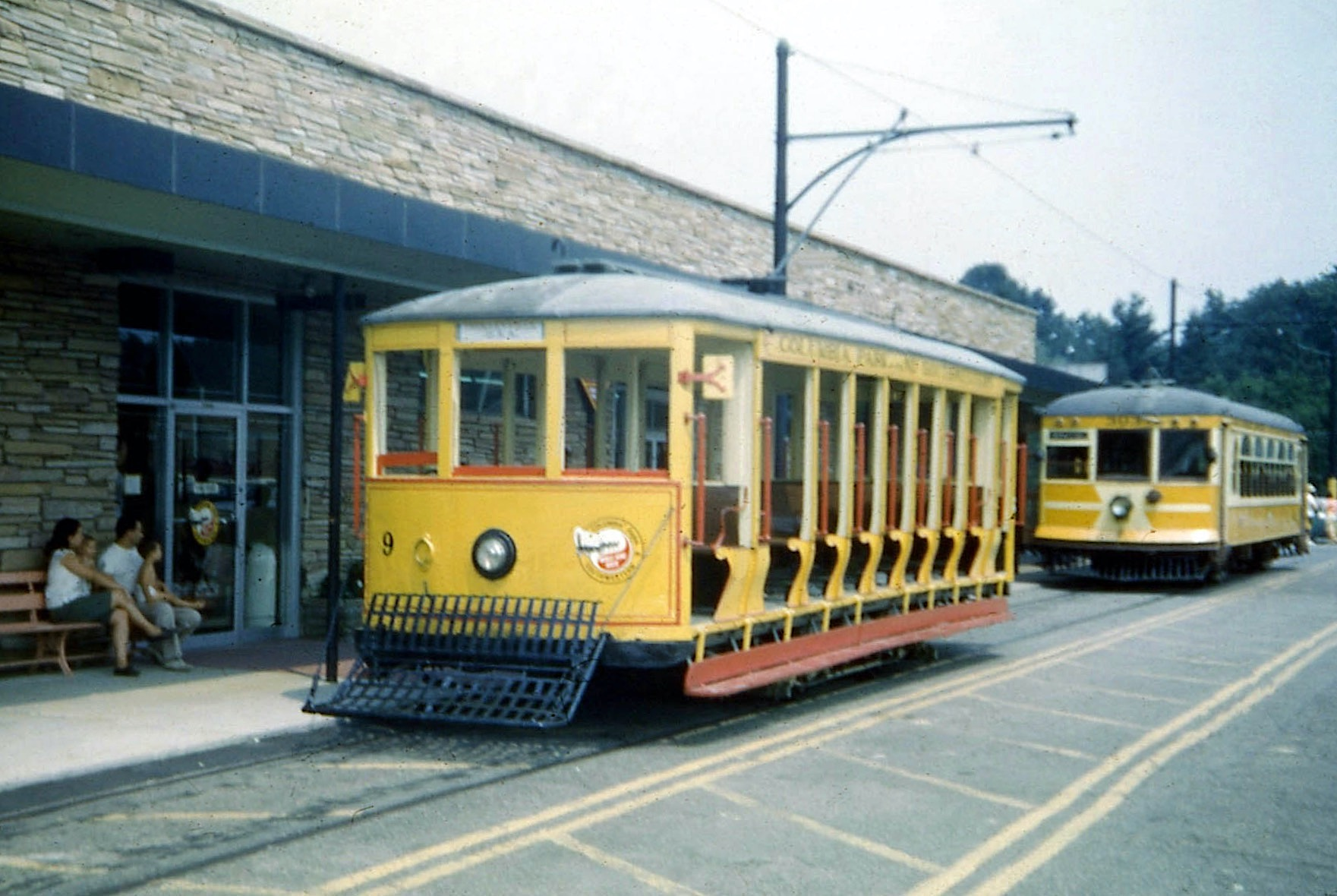
Ex-Veracruz car 9 in 1966, at the former Trolleyville USA museum. It is being restored by FSTM.

As of 2016, the museum has two fully restored and operational streetcars: Fort Smith car 224, which was listed on the National Register of Historic Places in 1994 as Birney Safety Streetcar No. 224, and Hot Springs Street Railway Company car 50 (built in 1904 by the St. Louis Car Company), which operated in Hot Springs, Arkansas, until 1939. Car 50 entered service in May 2016, after 16 years of restoration work, but Birney car 224 remains the primary streetcar that the museum uses for normal service (because one-man operation is more practical with it). Several Birney cars such as 224 were in regular service on the original Fort Smith streetcar system for its last several years, through to the abandonment of the system, on November 15, 1933.

Although restoration work has been under way on other streetcars at the museum for several years, car 224 was the only operational car for the first 25 years of trolley operation at the museum – until car 50's restoration was completed in 2016.

Among the other streetcars in the collection are three more which, as with No. 224, operated in municipal service in Fort Smith:

- Fort Smith Traction, Light and Power 10, built in 1902 (body only)
- Fort Smith Light and Traction 205, Birney car built in 1919 (body only)
- Fort Smith Light and Traction 221, Birney car built in 1926 (body only)

In addition, an open streetcar built by the J. G. Brill Company in 1908 was acquired from the Texas Transportation Museum (in San Antonio, Texas) in 1995. It is ex-Veracruz, Mexico, No. 6. The Fort Smith and Veracruz cars are all single-truck cars, but in 1992 FSSRA acquired the body of Hot Springs Street Railway Company car 50 (St. Louis Car Company, 1904), a double-truck car which once operated in Hot Springs. The organization subsequently acquired trucks and motors for the car, and began working on restoring it to operating condition, a goal that was reached in 2016. Another Birney car in the collection is ex-Kansas City 1545, built in 1919.

Three additional streetcars were acquired in 2009: ex-Little Rock Birney cars 305 and 310, which FSSRA plans to combine into one operating car, and a second ex-Veracruz open car, No. 9. The latter is the same type as FSTM's car 6, a 1908 Brill car, which has yet to be restored to operating condition. The group now plans to restore car 9 to operating condition first, using some parts from car 6. Car 9 was acquired from the Lake Shore Electric museum group.

=== Locomotives ===
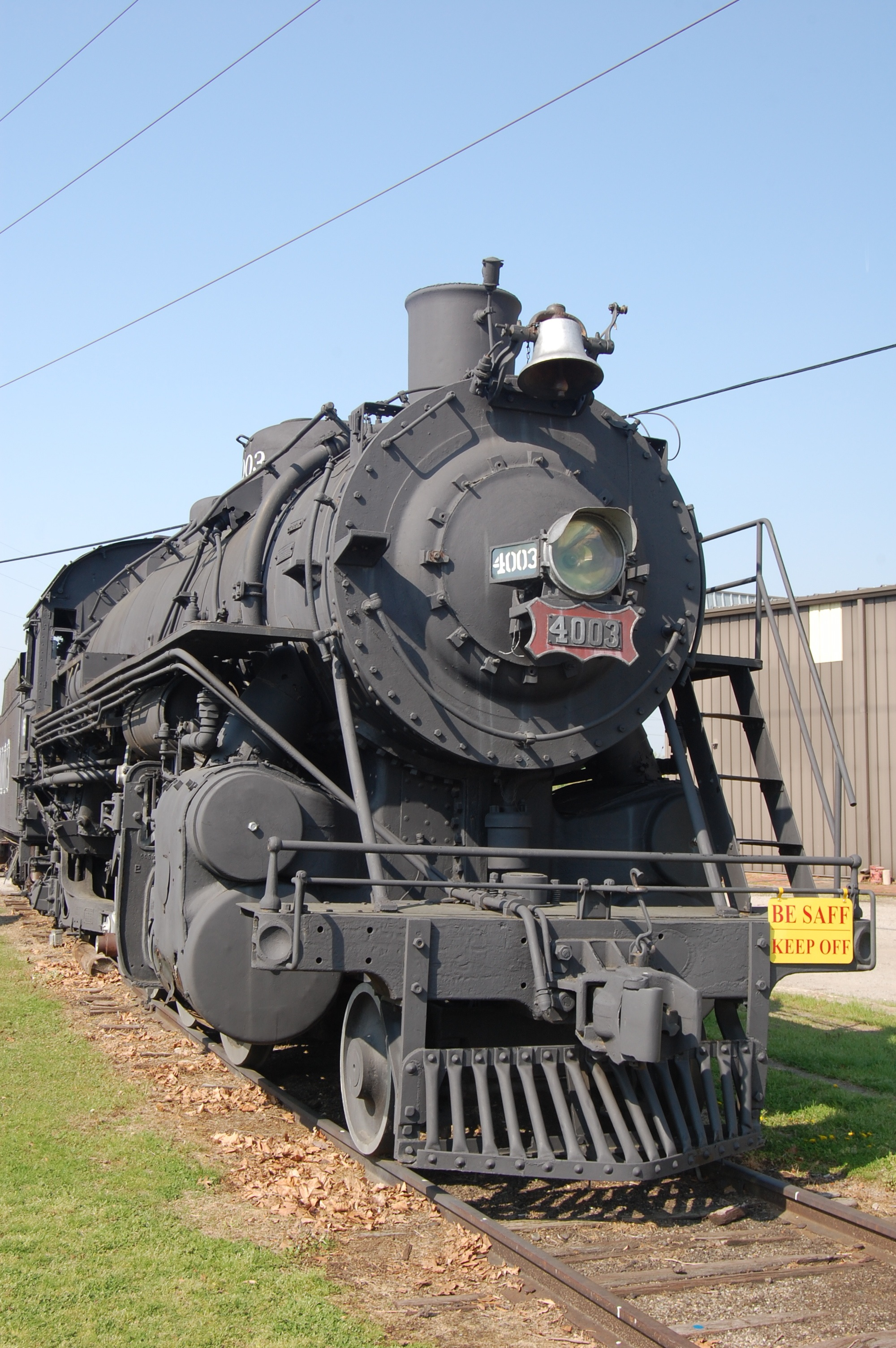
Frisco 4003 in 2008

Of four locomotives owned by the museum and kept on public display, three are listed on the National Register of Historic Places (NRHP):

- Frisco 4003, a USRA Light Mikado steam locomotive built in 1919 – donated to FSTM in 1998 and listed on the NRHP in 2004.
- Maumelle Ordnance Works Locomotive 1, a Vulcan gasoline-mechanical, 35-ton switcher built in 1942 – donated to FSTM in 1988 and listed on the NRHP in 2006.
- United States Air Force Locomotive No. 1246, a General Electric diesel-electric, 44-ton switcher built in 1953, which was listed on the NRHP on the same date as Locomotive No. 1 (shown above), September 20, 2006 (ref. no. 06000840). It was acquired by FSTM in 1992.

Also in the collection are three cabooses, a passenger car and various items of non-passenger railroad rolling stock.

=== Buses ===
As of 1997, the museum owned three vintage motor buses: A 1939 ex-Little Rock Twin Coach R-23, a 1954 Fort Smith General Motors TGH-3102 bus, and a 1951 ex-Oklahoma City GM bus. The original Fort Smith bus, No. 285, was used in the 1988 movie Biloxi Blues.

== See also ==
- Fort Smith Transit
- Streetcars in North America
