= Fort Collins Municipal Railway No. 22 =

- Fort Collins Municipal Railway Car No. 22
- U.S. National Register of Historic Places
- Colorado State Register of Historic Properties
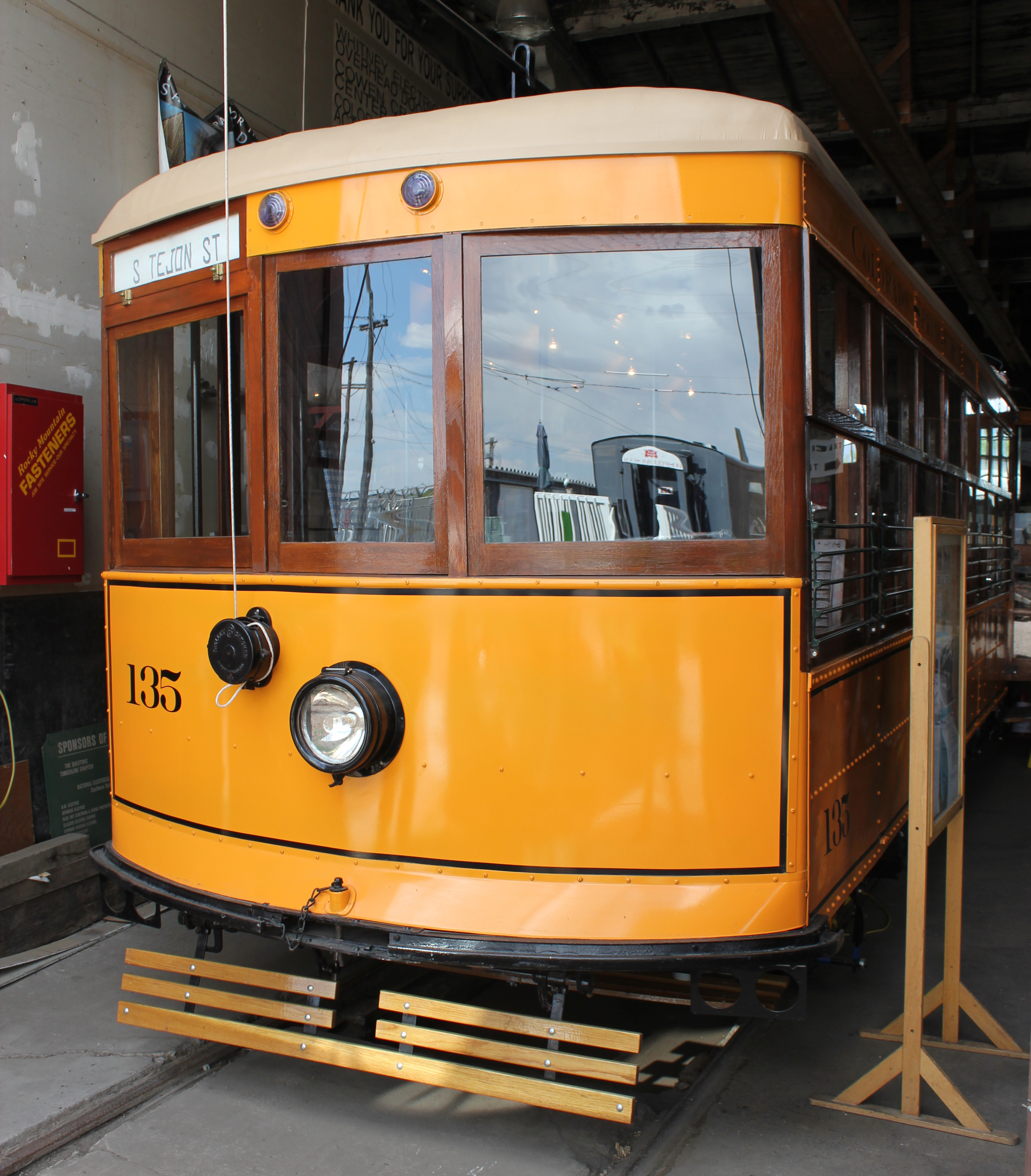
- Former Fort Collins streetcar 22, now painted as Colorado Springs No. 135

- Location within Colorado
- Location: 2333 Steel Drive, Colorado Springs, Colorado
- Coordinates: 38°52′01″N 104°49′53″W
- Built: 1919
- NRHP reference No.: 11000901
- Added to NRHP: December 15, 2011

The Fort Collins Municipal Railway Car No. 22 is a streetcar listed on the U.S. National Register of Historic Places. Since 1995, the car has been located in Colorado Springs, Colorado.

The car was built for use on the Fort Collins Municipal Railway in Fort Collins, Colorado, by the American Car Company of St. Louis in 1919 and was used until 1951, when the streetcar service in Fort Collins was abandoned. It is a type of streetcar known as a Birney "Safety Car". The Rocky Mountain Railroad Club purchased it in 1953 and moved it to Denver. After five years in storage, car 22 was moved to the Colorado Railroad Museum in 1958 and put on display there.

In 1994, the Rocky Mountain Railroad Club began leasing No. 22 to the Pikes Peak Historical Street Railway Foundation (PPHSRF), in Colorado Springs, and the car was moved there in 1995. When the 10-year lease expired, the Rocky Mountain Railroad Club agreed to sell the streetcar to the PPHSRF, which has a short section of operational streetcar line. In 2007, PPHSRF, now doing business under the name of the former Colorado Springs & Interurban Railway (CS&IR), changed No. 22's current identity by giving it a new paint scheme and renumbering it as CS&IR No. 135.

Car 135, ex-Fort Collins 22, is one of two preserved Fort Collins streetcars listed on the National Register. The other is Fort Collins Municipal Railway Birney Safety Streetcar No. 21.

A third Birney-type streetcar listed on the National Register is Birney Safety Streetcar No. 224, in Fort Smith, Arkansas.

== See also ==
- National Register of Historic Places listings in El Paso County, Colorado
- Streetcars in North America
