= Birney =

Streetcar

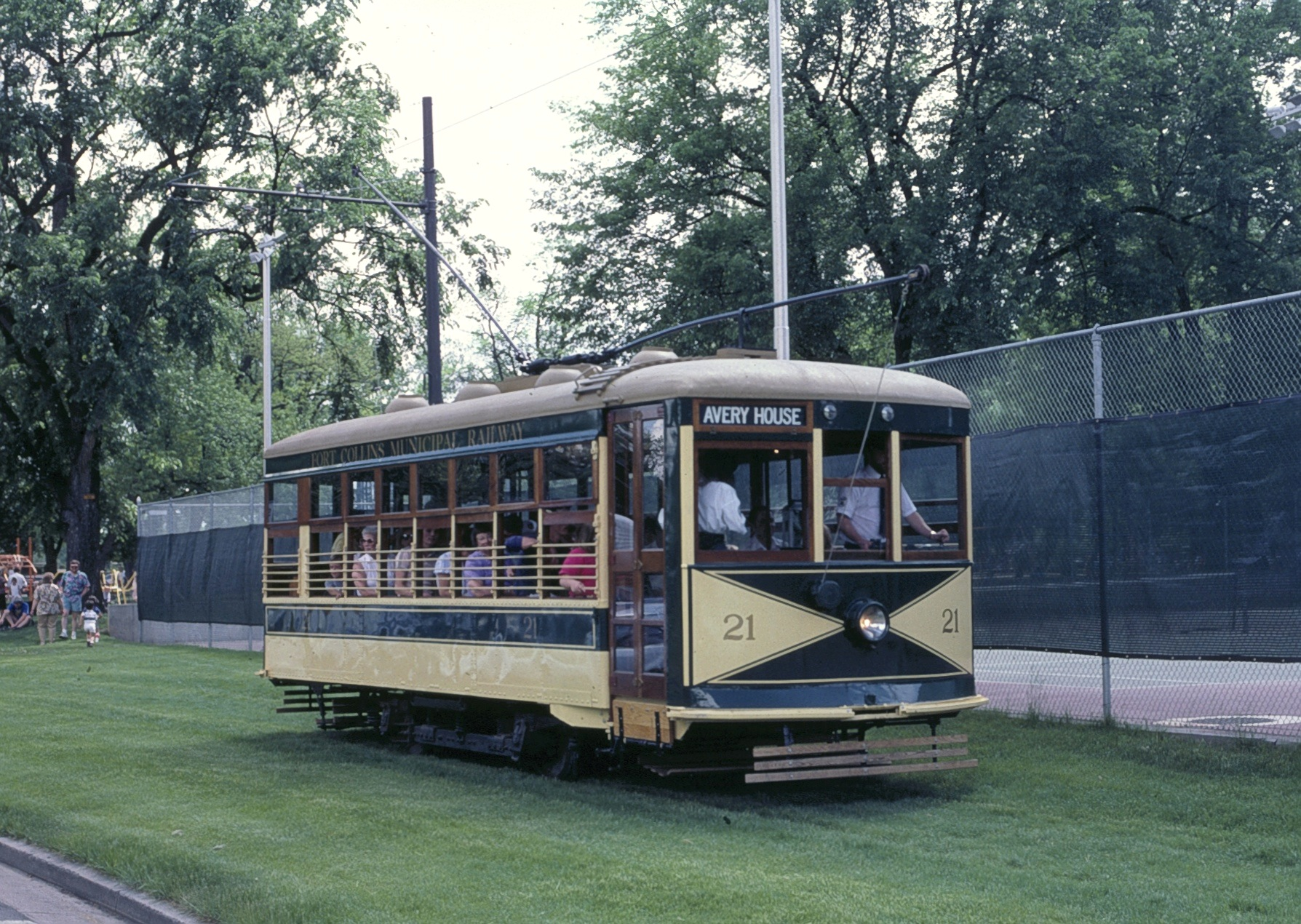
Fort Collins Municipal Railway Birney car 21, built in 1919

A Birney or Birney Safety Car is a type of streetcar that was manufactured in the United States in the 1910s and 1920s. The design was small and light and was intended to be an economical means of providing frequent service at a lower infrastructure and labor cost than conventional streetcars. Production of Birney cars lasted from 1915 until 1930, and more than 6,000 of the original, single-truck version were built. Several manufacturers built Birney cars. The design was "the first mass-produced standard streetcar (albeit with minor variations)" in North America.

== Invention ==
The Birney car was the joint 1915 invention of Charles Birney and Joseph Bosenbury (who was issued the patents in 1917 and 1919, and assigned half to Birney; see Brill page 140). Birney was an engineer with the firm of Stone & Webster, an operator of a number of trolley systems in the United States in the early part of the 20th century. The design was named the "Safety Car", and became known as the "Birney Safety Car" and ultimately simply as the "Birney" car.

The vehicle was a return to single-truck (single-bogie) streetcars. Birneys were small and light, about a third the weight of conventional cars of the period; were of rugged, standardized construction; mass-produced and inexpensively built. Twin motors gave them nimble acceleration. Birney cars averaged about 28 feet (8.5 m) in length and typically had seating for about 32 passengers.

The largest producer of Birney Safety Cars was the American Car Company, a subsidiary of the J. G. Brill Company, but several other companies also manufactured Birneys (e.g. Ottawa Car Company).

== Benefits and safety features ==
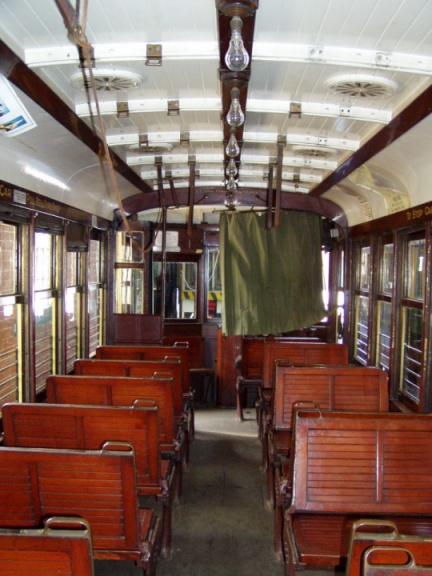
Birney safety car, typical interior

The Birney was designed to operate with only a motorman, saving the cost of the conductor. Single-person operation became even more attractive during the labor shortage of World War I. When labor was available, Birneys could be operated at more frequent intervals, prompting the slogan "A Car in Sight at all Times". This latter attraction was one of the street railway industry's first attempts to deal directly with automobile competition.

The Birney Car also introduced the use of pneumatically balanced and interlocked doors. If a door was stuck open, or a passenger or other object blocked the door, the motors could not be started.

The controls on the Birney Car also included an early application of the "deadman control". This device removed power from the car's motors and applied the air brakes if the controller handle was released for any reason, causing the car to come to an abrupt stop.

A longer, double-truck version of the Birney car was developed in the 1920s, incorporating its most successful features. The first of these were ordered in 1918 by the Cape Breton Electric Company, which later cancelled the order. The two cars – the only double-truck center-entrance Birney cars to be built – were eventually delivered to the Waterbury and Milldale Tramway in 1921. Double-truck Birney cars were sold to a number of systems, including that of Tampa, Florida, and to the Texas Interurban Railway, which used them exclusively. In addition to 11 double-truck passenger cars, which featured deluxe interior appointments and toilets for interurban service, the Texas Interurban operated three unusual Birney-based double-truck express cars without passenger seats or windows– the only cars of this type ever built.

== Decline ==
Thousands of the cars were purchased from their inception to a few years after the end of the war. Production peaked in 1920, with 1,699 cars built in that year alone, but then declined rapidly and ended in 1930.

Birney cars began to fall from favor in part because of the features that had originally made them attractive. Their light weight could be a problem in snow that a heavier car could easily plow through. Their short length made their ride quality comparatively poor, and on poorly maintained track they derailed easily. The public began to deride them as flimsy. Their limited passenger capacity rendered them unsuitable for busy routes and rush hour service, causing them to be relegated to minor lines or to be sold mostly to small-town streetcar systems.

The streetcar companies also found that the safety features of the Birney, such as the use of interlocked doors to prevent the car from starting if a door was open or a passenger was stuck, could be incorporated in larger cars and that the public was not as disturbed by the absence of the conductor as the companies had feared.

== International use ==
Its initial rise and fall notwithstanding, the Birney car was useful and durable, and many were shipped to streetcar systems in other countries, especially ones located in smaller cities and towns, where they served for additional decades. For example, the city of Halifax, Nova Scotia, Canada, bought up Birneys secondhand from other systems (including 22 acquired from the Toronto Transportation Commission (TTC) and five from Bakersfield and Kern Electric Railway) across North America to build an "all-Birney fleet" and keep its streetcar system going in the difficult years of the Great Depression and World War II, finally retiring its last car in 1949. The Toronto Civic Railways operated 25 Birney cars in Toronto from 1920 to 1921 when the TTC took over the TCR and continued operating the cars until 1940 (remaining 14 cars were sold to Halifax excluding 3 sold to Cornwall in 1926 and 8 to Halifax in 1927).

Although the vast majority of the cars built were sold to streetcar operators in North America (including in Mexico and Cuba), a small number went to much more distant places, such as Australia and New Zealand. In the latter, Birney cars were imported for use by the provincial centres of New Plymouth in the North Island and Invercargill in the South Island, reputedly the world's most southerly tramway system.

Cities in South America whose streetcar companies purchased Birney cars included Concordia and Paraná, in Argentina, while Guayaquil in Ecuador obtained Birneys secondhand from Trenton, New Jersey. The Colombian cities of Medellín and Pereira both were served by Birney streetcars, the former's fleet being made up entirely of Birney cars – 61 of them – of both single- and double-truck configuration. In 1930, the Curitiba, Brazil, tramway system bought 20 second-hand Birney cars from Boston and these cars were converted to metre gauge.

In Australia the Municipal Tramways Trust, Adelaide purchased four as its Type G tram; the Melbourne & Metropolitan Tramways Board purchased two as its X class; and the Melbourne Electric Supply Company (Geelong) purchased two. The two Birneys in Geelong were unusual, having been built with longitudinal seating. These and the four Adelaide cars were transferred to Bendigo in 1947, where four of them remained in revenue service until 1972. One each of the Geelong and Adelaide cars is operational on the Bendigo Tramways heritage line; the three other Adelaide cars are held by the Tramway Museum, St Kilda, South Australia, with one in regular service.

== Preservation and continued use ==
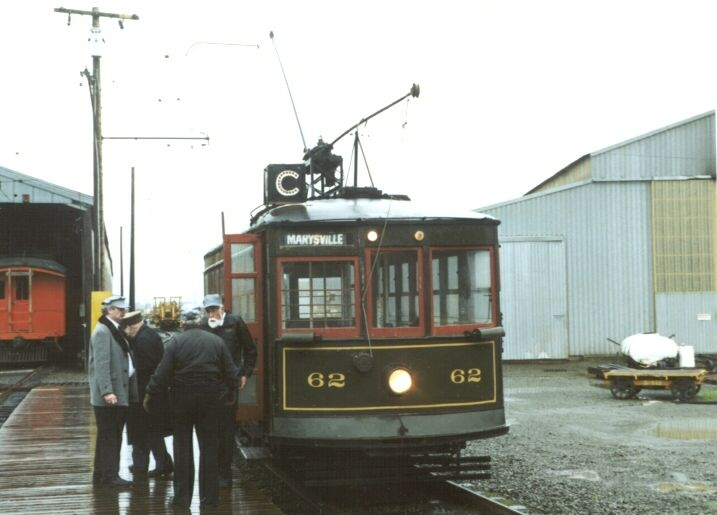
Sacramento Northern Birney car 62 at the Western Railway Museum, Rio Vista, California

=== Australia ===
Seven of the eight Birney cars imported there have survived in operating condition:

- five are at Bendigo Tramways, - two ex-Geelong cars and three from Adelaide.
- one G type at the Adelaide Tramway Museum, St Kilda.
- one Melbourne X class housed at the Hawthorn tram depot in Melbourne. Thus, Australia has a high proportion of the world's surviving, operable Birney cars.

=== Canada ===
- The Nelson Electric Tramway (in Nelson, B.C.) has one fully restored Birney car.

=== New Zealand ===
- New Plymouth Birney No. 8 is preserved by Wanganui Tramways.
- Invercargill Birney car No. 15 was restored by the Tramway Historical Society at Ferrymead Heritage Park, Christchurch. It operates on the Christchurch tramway.
- Invercargill No.16 was recently rediscovered and recovered to the Bill Richardson Transport World in Invercargill and is being restored for static display.

=== United States of America ===
A number of Birney cars remain in use today in North America at trolley museums and heritage streetcar operations. Single examples of original Birney cars are in service on heritage streetcar lines in Tampa, Florida; Fort Collins, Colorado; San Jose, California, and Fort Smith, Arkansas, as well as on the M-Line Trolley line in Dallas, Texas. Three of these cars, Fort Collins car 21, Fort Collins car 22, and Fort Smith car 224, are listed on the U.S. National Register of Historic Places.

Replica Birney cars built by Gomaco are in service in at least four U.S. cities (see below).

=== Replica Birney cars ===
In the United States, the Gomaco Trolley Company has built at least 18 replica Birney cars, in the style of the less-common double-truck Birney car design, since 1999. Gomaco fitted these with trucks from ex-Milan, Italy Peter Witt streetcars. These have been supplied to Tampa, Florida; Charlotte, North Carolina; Little Rock, Arkansas and Memphis, Tennessee. Gomaco also restored an original single-truck Birney car body in 2002–3 for the Fresno Metropolitan Flood Control District in Fresno, California; this was intended for static display in a local park.

== See also ==
- Peter Witt streetcar
- PCC streetcar
