= Birney Safety Streetcar No. 224 =

- U.S. National Register of Historic Places
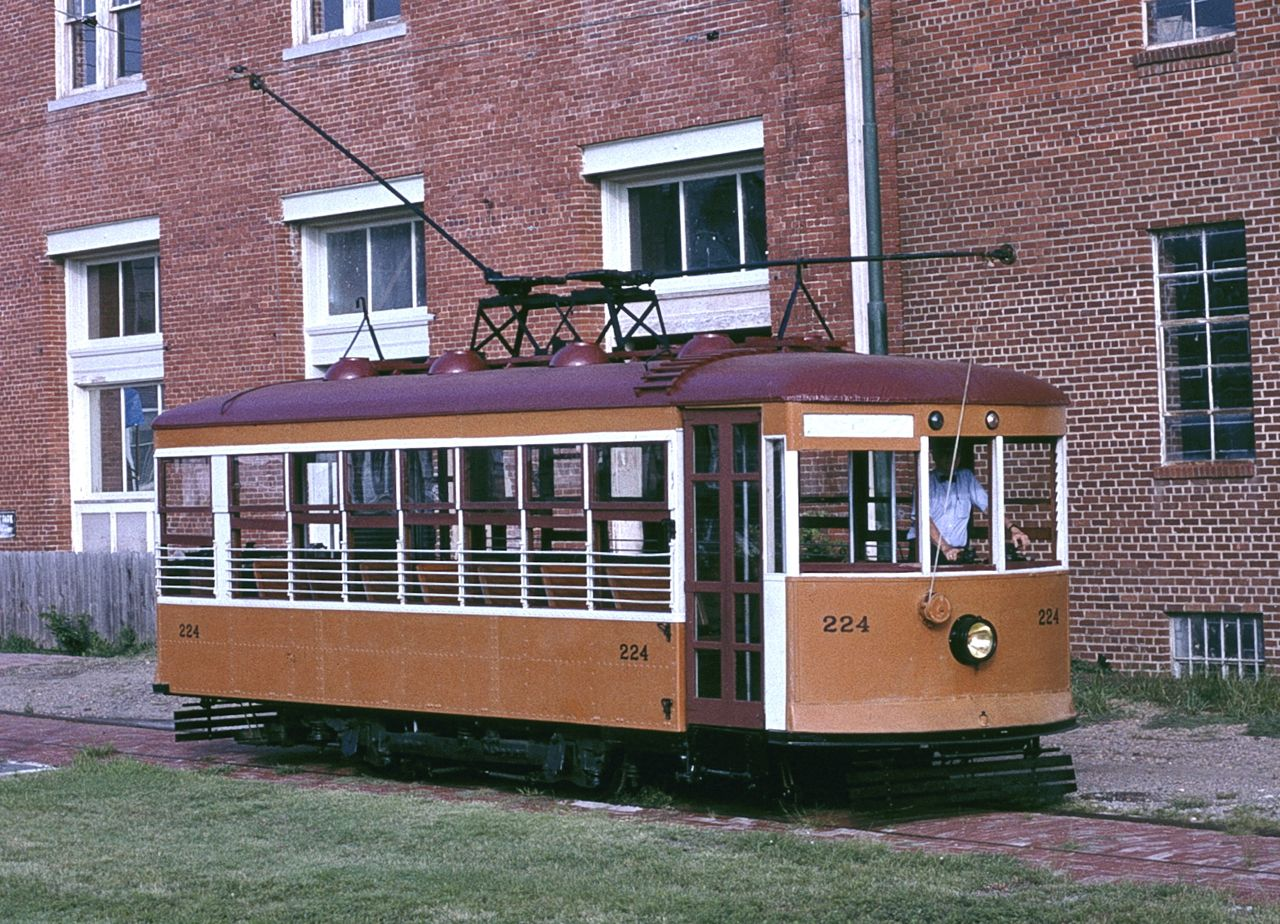
- Birney car 224 in operation on the Fort Smith Trolley Museum line
- Location: Fort Smith Trolley Museum, 100 S. Fourth St., Fort Smith, Arkansas, United States
- Coordinates: 35°23′8″N 94°25′48.7″W
- Built: 1926
- Architect: American Car Company
- NRHP reference No.: 94000465
- Added to NRHP: May 19, 1994

Birney Safety Streetcar No. 224 is a streetcar (or trolley) in Fort Smith, Arkansas, listed on the U.S. National Register of Historic Places. Built in 1926 by the American Car Company division of the J. G. Brill Company, it is a type of streetcar known as a Birney "Safety Car". It was listed on the National Register in 1994 and is one of fewer than 10 streetcars listed.

== Original use ==
Introduced in 1915, the Birney Safety Car was a new standardized streetcar design that encompassed new safety features; it was also lighter in weight than earlier designs and more economical to operate. Its economies gave a "new lease on life" to many small-town streetcar systems.

No. 224 was built and purchased in 1926. The Fort Smith streetcar system used several Birney-type cars during the last several years of streetcar service, until the abandonment of the system by the Fort Smith Light & Traction Company on November 15, 1933. Car 224 was later used as a diner in Ashdown, Arkansas.

== Restoration and new use ==
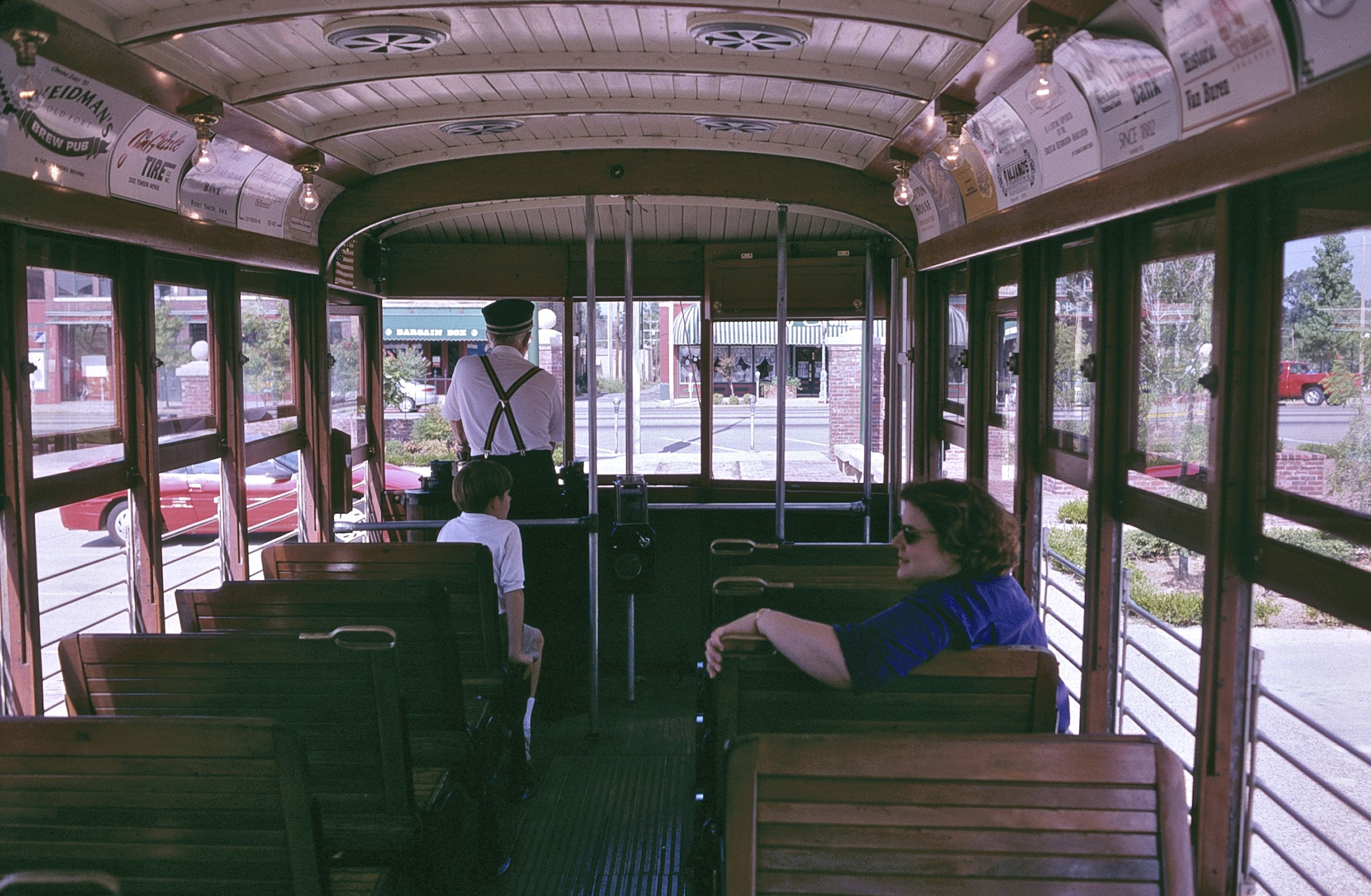
Interior of car 224

Birney car 224 is owned by the Fort Smith Streetcar Restoration Association (FSSRA) and is part of the Fort Smith Trolley Museum (FSTM) collection. Car 224 was restored by FSSRA volunteers and began carrying passengers on the museum's heritage streetcar line on May 19, 1991. It was added to the National Register exactly three years later, on May 19, 1994. The FSTM streetcar line, or trolley line – the terms streetcar and trolley are used interchangeably in much of North America connects Garrison Avenue, in downtown, with the gates of the Fort Smith National Cemetery.

== Description ==
Like many streetcars, car 224 is a "double-ended" car – capable of being operated from either end. It has a single door on each side. The backs of its wooden-bench seats are reversible, allowing the seats to face either end of the car. This type of seat was also known as a "walkover" seat, as the motorman could walk down the car's center aisle at the end of the line and flip the backs of the seats over. The 600 Volts DC that powers the car's electric motor is collected from the overhead trolley wire via a trolley pole on the roof; only one of the two poles is in use at a time, depending on the direction of travel. The car has a single truck and, overall, is approximately 27 feet (8.2 m) long.

Fort Smith car 224 is one of three Birney streetcars listed on the National Register of Historic Places, the others both being from the former Fort Collins, Colorado system: Fort Collins car 21, which operates on a heritage streetcar line in its home town, and Fort Collins car 22.

== See also ==
- National Register of Historic Places listings in Sebastian County, Arkansas
- Streetcars in North America
