= Maumelle Ordnance Works Locomotive 1 =

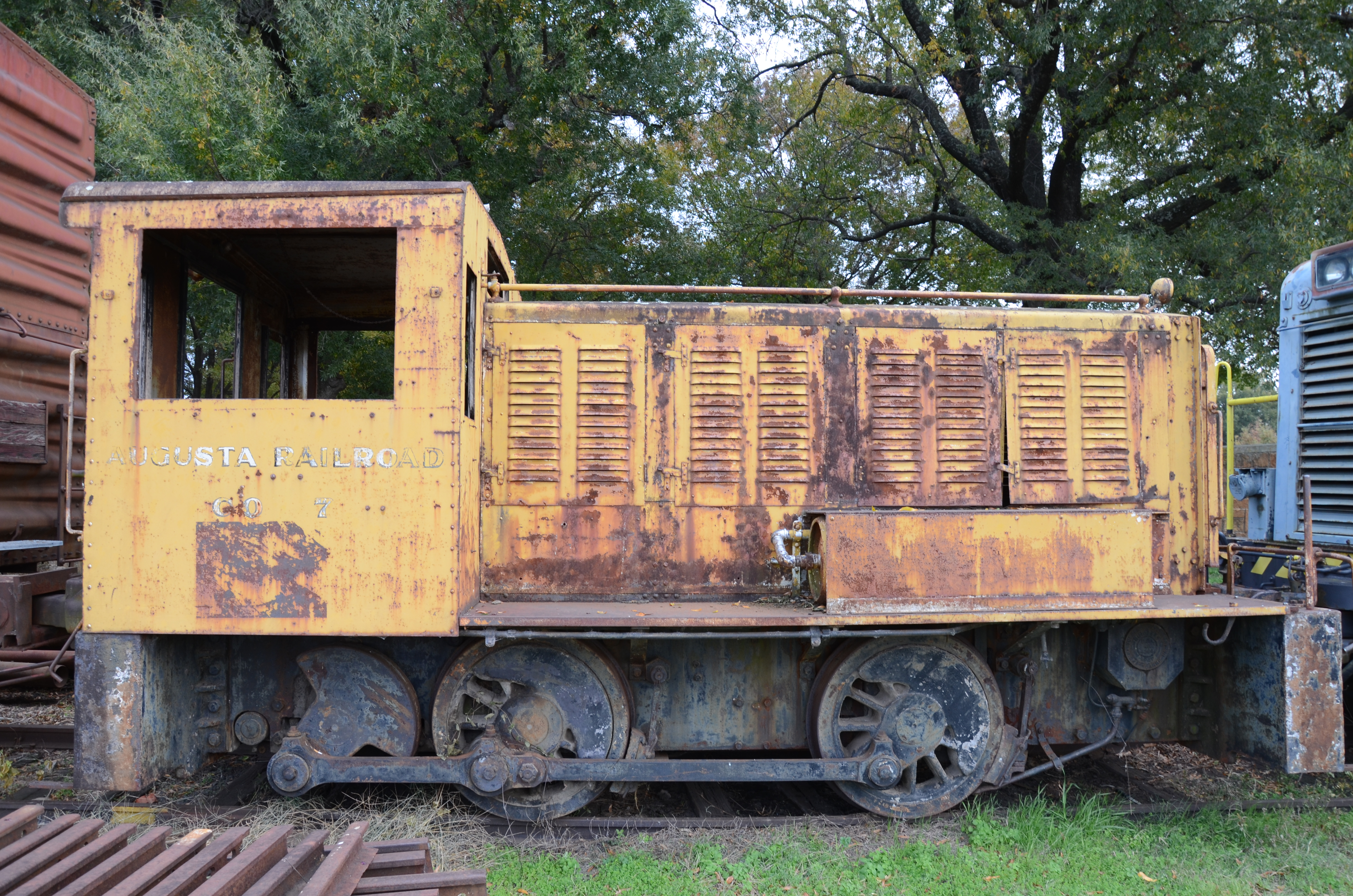
Type and origin
- Power type: Gasoline-mechanical
- Builder: Vulcan Iron Works (of Wilkes-Barre, Pennsylvania)
- Serial number: 4364
- Model: 35 ton
- Build date: April 1942
Specifications
- Configuration
  - Whyte: 0-4-0PM
  - AAR: B
  - UIC: B
- Gauge: 4 ft 8 1/2 in (1,435 mm)
- Loco weight: 35 short tons (32 t)
- Prime mover: Hercules, gasoline
- RPM range: 1800
- Transmission: 4-speed constant mesh, via side rods
Career
- Operators: Maumelle Ordnance Works #1; US Army #8223 (c1945); Augusta Railroad #7 (c1952)
- Delivered: 1942
- Last run: c. 1958
- Retired: 1958
- Preserved: 1988
- Current owner: Fort Smith Trolley Museum
- Disposition: On static display, based in Fort Smith, Arkansas
- Maumelle Ordnance Works Locomotive #1
- U.S. National Register of Historic Places
- Location within Arkansas Location within the United States
- Location: 100 S 4th St., Fort Smith, Arkansas
- Coordinates: 35°23′8″N 94°25′50″W
- Area: less than one acre
- Built: 1942
- Architect: Vulcan Iron Works
- NRHP reference No.: 06000835
- Added to NRHP: September 20, 2006

Maumelle Ordnance Works Locomotive 1 is a gasoline-powered, mechanically driven, two-axle railway locomotive which was built in 1942 by Vulcan Iron Works (of Wilkes-Barre, Pennsylvania) for the United States War Department's Maumelle Ordnance Works. It was added to the U.S. National Register of Historic Places in 2006 and is preserved at the Fort Smith Trolley Museum.

== History ==
The Maumelle Ordnance Works were built by the War Department in 1941 to produce the explosives picric acid, ammonium picrate, and ammonium nitrate. The plant began production in 1942 and the locomotive was purchased to move freight cars around the facility, which was spread over 7,000 acres (2,800 ha) to minimize the risk of incidents spreading from one production unit to others. The plant stopped production in August 1945 and was decontaminated and shut down by November. The land passed through several hands and eventually became the planned community of Maumelle, Arkansas.

The Arkansas nomination document says that locomotive #1 was then transferred to the Army, renumbered 8223, and sent to the Newport Army Air Field. The airfield, however, had been renamed "Marine Corps Air Facility Newport" in 1944 and turned over to the City of Newport at the end of the war.

Wherever it spent the period after the war, in the early 1950s the government sold the locomotive to the Augusta Railroad, a 1.65-mile (2.66 km) line that connected Augusta, Arkansas, near Broadway and 1st Street, to the Missouri Pacific at 6th Street in New Augusta. Parts of the railroad right of way are still obvious on the Google aerial view. The little gasoline locomotive replaced a 1924 Alco 2-6-0 steam locomotive that had been condemned. During the 1950s, the railroad gradually died, as its traffic shifted to trucks. The railroad went through an abandonment proceeding in 1958 and was purchased by Glenn Taggart and Bing Miller. Subsequently, Tommy Taggart bought Miller's interest. He kept the locomotive until he donated it to the Fort Smith Trolley Museum in June 1988.

== Design ==
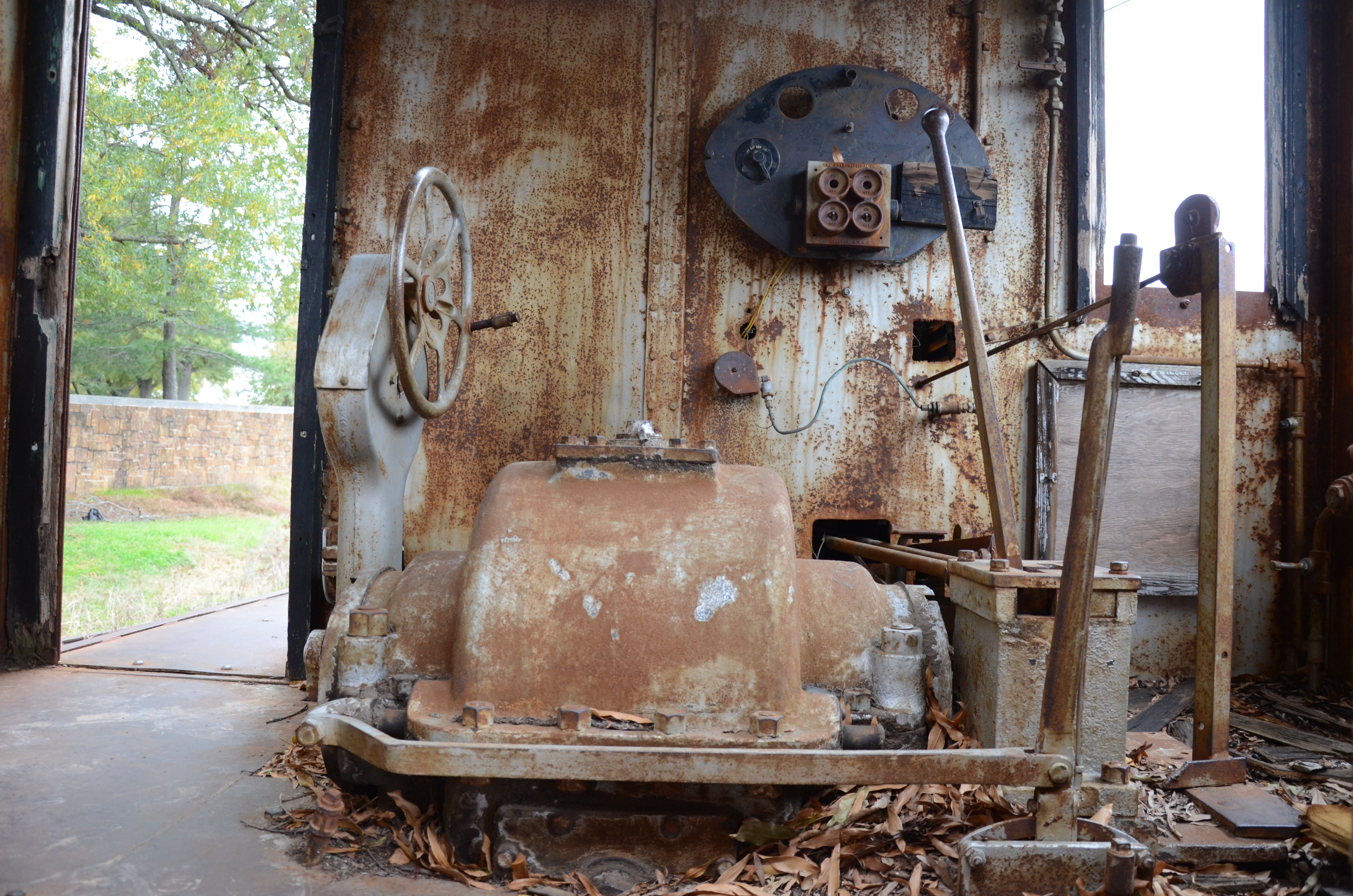
The locomotive's controls

Locomotive #1 is an unusual combination. Virtually all internal combustion locomotives are diesel-electrics, powered by a diesel prime mover driving a generator which in turn drives one or more electric traction motors; apart from some diesel-mechanical and diesel-hydraulic locomotives. All of the major manufacturers had discarded the use of gasoline engines by the middle 1930s in favor of diesel, primarily on the grounds of fuel economy. Vulcan continued to produce a very limited number of both while it also continued to produce steam locomotives. In early 1942 it is likely that war needs made it easier to get a gasoline engine than a diesel because a gasoline engine uses much less material.

Electric drive is almost universal because a railroad locomotive is a difficult environment for a mechanical gearbox, as the loads vary widely from second to second as the slack action runs in and out. Only on very small locomotives, pulling a limited number of cars, generally on level track, have there been any successful gearbox locomotive drives. In the case of Locomotive 1, the four-speed gearbox drives a jackshaft under the cab which is connected with side rods to the two driving wheels. The choice of mechanical drive may also have been driven by war availability – a generator and traction motor take hundreds of pounds of copper, which was scarce.

The nomination document quotes a Vulcan ad in the 1947 Locomotive Cyclopedia, ""All Vulcan diesel and gasoline geared locomotives are equipped with a distinctive four-speed, constant-mesh, spur-geared transmission which permits easy gear changes at relatively high speeds. Gears and shafts are heat-treated nickel-chromium steel mounted on anti-friction bearings and operating in an oil bath. Extra-heavy cross-equalized semi-elliptic springs and Vulcan 3-point suspension assure easy riding on rough track and minimize derailments."

It was added to the National Register of Historic Places in 2006.
