= Texas Interurban Railway =

Overview
- Status: Defunct
- Locale: Dallas, Texas

Service
- Type: Interurban
- Services: 2

History
- Opened: 1923
- Closed: 1932

Technical
- Track gauge: 4 ft 8 1/2 in (1,435 mm) standard gauge
- Electrification: Trolley wire

The Texas Interurban Railway was an electric interurban railway that operated from Dallas, Texas, to Terrell and Denton from 1923 to 1932. The line to Terrell was built and operated exclusively by the Texas Interurban, while service to Denton was provided using trackage rights on a preexisting Missouri–Kansas–Texas Railroad (Katy) branch line that was electrified with overhead lines. The venture was a financial failure; service ended after less than ten years when the Dallas Union Trust Company foreclosed.

== History ==
At the start of the 20th century, Stone & Webster controlled several street railways and power companies in the Dallas area, but its relations with the city government deteriorated for various reasons, and in 1916, the city asked General Electric (GE) to acquire the Stone & Webster holdings and consolidate them into a single power company and a single railway transit company. In 1917, GE agreed, creating Dallas Power and Light to handle power generation and the Dallas Railway Company to operate the city's transit system, and also agreed to build two interurban lines from Dallas to unspecified destinations at least 30 miles (48 km) distant within two years, guaranteed by a bond of $550,000 (equivalent to $13,821,000 in 2025).

The contract was delayed by World War I. When the war ended, GE and Dallas pursued building a single 135-mile (217 km) interurban to Wichita Falls instead of the pair of shorter lines proposed previously. This proposal was ultimately called off due to inadequate funding, and GE attempted to back out of the original contract in 1920, but the city would not allow it. In January 1921, to avoid forfeiting the $550,000 bond, GE agreed to build the originally specified pair of lines, with construction to start on the first line in March and the second line in September. Strickland, Calder and Hobson was incorporated in Dallas to run the venture; its name was later changed to the Texas Interurban Railway Company.

The first section, 29 miles (47 km) from Dallas to Terrell, opened on January 14, 1923. Most of the line was newly built and roughly paralleled the Texas and Pacific Railway, with the exception of the tracks accessing downtown Dallas, which were shared with the Dallas Railway's Forney streetcar line. Construction cost was $2 million (equivalent to $36.1 million in 2025). In an unusual arrangement for an interurban, the Texas Midland Railroad and the Texas Interurban coordinated their schedules in Terrell, and sold tickets on each other's trains.

Between 1906 and 1913, attempts had been made to extend interurban service from Denton to Dallas, Fort Worth, and Slidell, but all failed without any construction taking place. In 1921, the Texas Interurban selected Denton as the terminus of its second line; rather than building all-new tracks, the company arranged trackage rights on the Denton branch of the Missouri–Kansas–Texas Railroad (popularly known as the Katy), which would be electrified. Dallas approved the project in October 1922, but the connection between the Katy and downtown Dallas required laying seven blocks of new track in Fairmount Avenue; landowners on the street sued and gained a court injunction halting construction in October 1923. The injunction was lifted on appeal in January 1924, construction resumed, and the inaugural trip was made on September 30, 1924. Public service started the next day, costing $1.25 for a one-way ticket and $2.40 for a return ($23 and $45 in 2025 adjusted for inflation). The 33-mile (53 km) line had 25 stops, with city termini on branches off the Katy line; in Denton the brick terminal was built at the corner of Ash (Austin) and McKinney streets. The line was electrified using a catenary with power supplied from three substations. Six passenger cars and one express car provided an hourly service from Denton from 5 am and 6 pm. The average speed was 23.8 miles per hour (38.3 km/h) and cars reached a top speed of 28 miles per hour (45 km/h).

Historian Johnnie J. Myers characterized the enterprise as "clearly an anachronism from the start". Due to its long gestation, the Texas Interurban faced competition from automobiles and buses from the outset, unlike other interurban systems, and bus companies undercut its fares between Dallas and Denton from 1925. The line to Terrell was profitable, but the Denton line never was. Cumulative earnings to March 1, 1928, were a $65,864 profit on the Terrell line, but this was offset by losses of $307,584 on the Denton line, amounting to an overall net loss of $241,720 (equal to a $1,235,000 profit, $5,767,000 loss, and $4,532,000 overall loss in 2025, respectively). In December 1928, the Terrell line was separately reincorporated as the Dallas-Terrell Interurban Railway; the reasons for this legal maneuver are historically obscure, but Myers speculates the intent was to insulate it from heavy operating losses on the Denton line. Myers notes that the demographics for both lines were never promising, as they traversed regions with an average population density of only 1,200 people per square mile (2.6 square km), while Terrell had a population of only 15,000, and Denton only 7,626.

Rail service was withdrawn on March 13, 1932, when the Dallas Union Trust Company foreclosed on the company. The Denton line was $1.2 million in debt (equivalent to $28.32 million in 2025). The lines were sold at auction by the Dallas County Sheriff on June 7 to Louis Mentz, who paid only $150 and $350 for the Denton and Terrell lines respectively (equal to $3,540 and $8,259 in 2025). Unshared tracks and overhead lines were scrapped, but some buildings survived, while the cars were transferred to the Dallas Railway and Terminal Company, where some would serve as streetcars until 1956.

== Equipment ==
The Texas Interurban Railway exclusively operated double-truck Birney cars, operating 11 passenger cars with deluxe interior appointments and toilets, along with three unusual double-truck express cars without passenger seats or windows—the only cars of this type ever built.

== See also ==
- Green Line (DART) and A-train (Texas) – modern light rail lines using the same right-of-way as the Denton line
