= United States Air Force Locomotive No. 1246 =

United States Air Force 1246
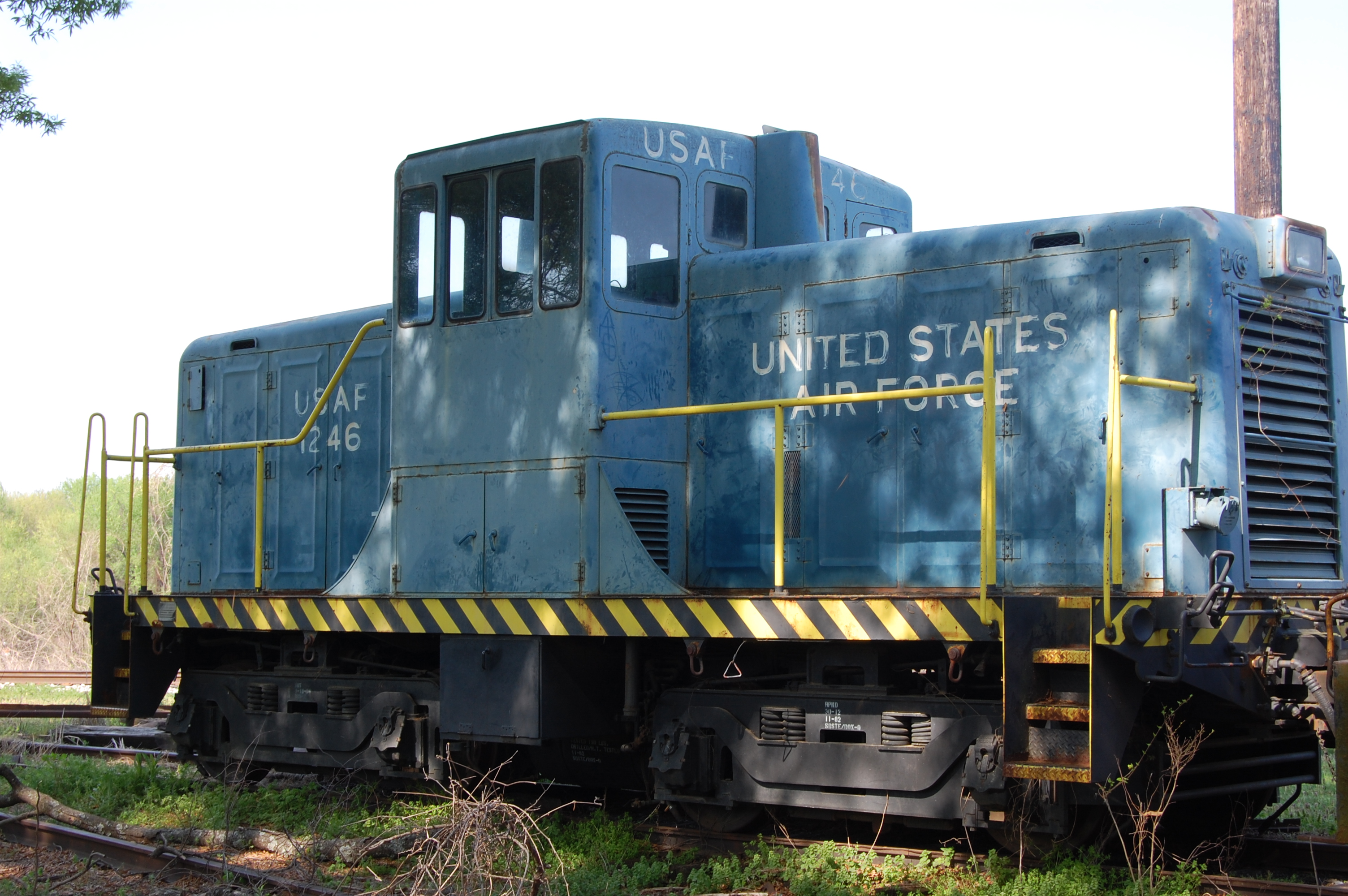
- 2008 photo
Type and origin
- Power type: Diesel-electric
- Builder: General Electric
- Serial number: 31870
- Model: 44-ton
- Build date: January 1953
Specifications
- Configuration
  - AAR: B-B
  - UIC: Bo′Bo′
- Gauge: 4 ft 8 1/2 in (1,435 mm)
- Prime mover: Caterpillar D17000, 2 off
- Engine type: V8 diesel
Performance figures
- Power output: 380 hp (283 kW)
Career
- Operators: United States Air Force
- Current owner: Fort Smith Trolley Museum
- Disposition: On static display, based in Fort Smith, Arkansas
- United States air Force Locomotive No. 1246
- U.S. National Register of Historic Places
- Location within Arkansas Location within the United States
- Location: 100 S 4th St., Fort Smith, Arkansas
- Coordinates: 35°23′7″N 94°25′47″W
- Area: less than one acre
- Built: 1953
- Architect: General Electric Company
- NRHP reference No.: 06000840
- Added to NRHP: September 20, 2006

The United States Air Force Locomotive No. 1246 is a historic diesel-electric railroad switch locomotive on display at the Fort Smith Trolley Museum in Fort Smith, Arkansas. It was manufactured in 1953 by the General Electric Company in Schenectady, New York, in fulfillment of a contract with the United States Air Force for eleven of its 44-ton locomotives. It is believed to have spent all of its productive life at Grissom Air Force Base in Indiana, and was acquired by the museum in 1992.

The locomotive was added to the National Register of Historic Places in 2006.

== See also ==
- National Register of Historic Places listings in Sebastian County, Arkansas
