= Vulcan Iron Works (Wilkes-Barre) =

Former American locomotive manufacturer

- Founded: 1849; 177 years ago in Wilkes-Barre, Pennsylvania
- Defunct: 1954
- Fate: Acquired
- Successor: General Industrial Locomotive Corp
- Headquarters: Wilkes-Barre, Pennsylvania

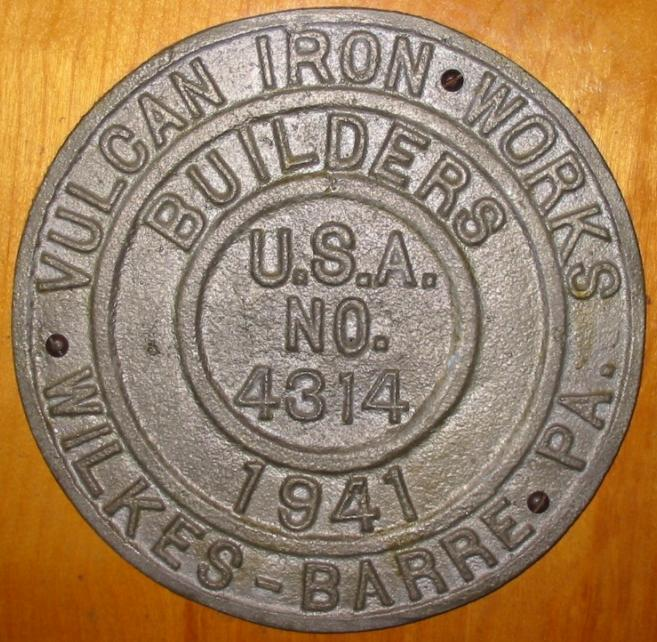
A Wilkes-Barre Pennsylvania Vulcan Iron Works builder's plate from 1941.

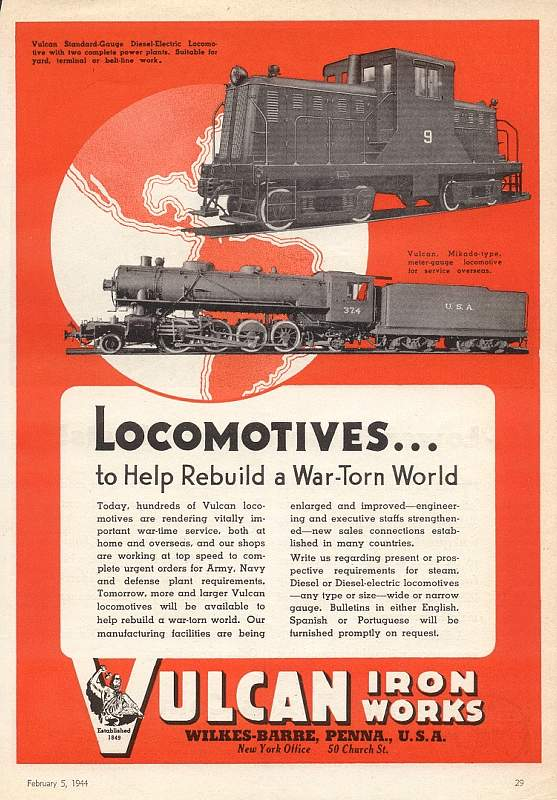
Wilkes-Barre Pennsylvania Vulcan Iron Works produced both steam and diesel locomotives in 1944

The Vulcan Iron Works, based in Wilkes-Barre, Pennsylvania, manufactured railroad locomotives such as those shown in the illustration. The company was established in 1849 by Richard Jones. It built locomotives such as the preserved Berlin Mills Railway 7 (1911), and by 1944 was constructing both steam and diesel locomotives, as illustrated (right). The company ceased operation in 1954, and its assets were acquired by General Industrial Locomotive Corp.

== War-time service ==
In February 1944, before the 'D-Day' Normandy landings, the company claimed

Today, hundreds of Vulcan locomotives are rendering vitally important war-time service, both at home and overseas, and our shops are working at top speed to complete urgent orders for Army, Navy and defense plant requirements. Tomorrow, more and larger Vulcan locomotives will be available to help rebuild a war-torn world. Our manufacturing facilities are being enlarged and improved ....

== Locomotives ==
Vulcan produced a wide variety of steam locomotives, mostly small but some with up to eight driving wheels. With the advent of internal combustion technology, the firm began producing small locomotives fueled not only with gasoline, but also benzine, alcohol, kerosene and naptha. Vulcan produced its first diesel locomotives in the 1920s; a total of 54 diesel-electric switcher units (each weighing 25 short tons (23 t) or more) came out of Vulcan's shops between 1938 and 1954. Its largest unit was a 70-short-ton (64 t) B-B unit built for Carnegie Steel Company in 1944. It also constructed the TCDD 56301 Class for the Turkish State Railways in 1947.

Vulcan built a large number of gasoline-powered locomotives with a mechanical drive, such as the Maumelle Ordnance Works Locomotive 1, built in 1942.
