= TCDD 56301 Class =

56301 class
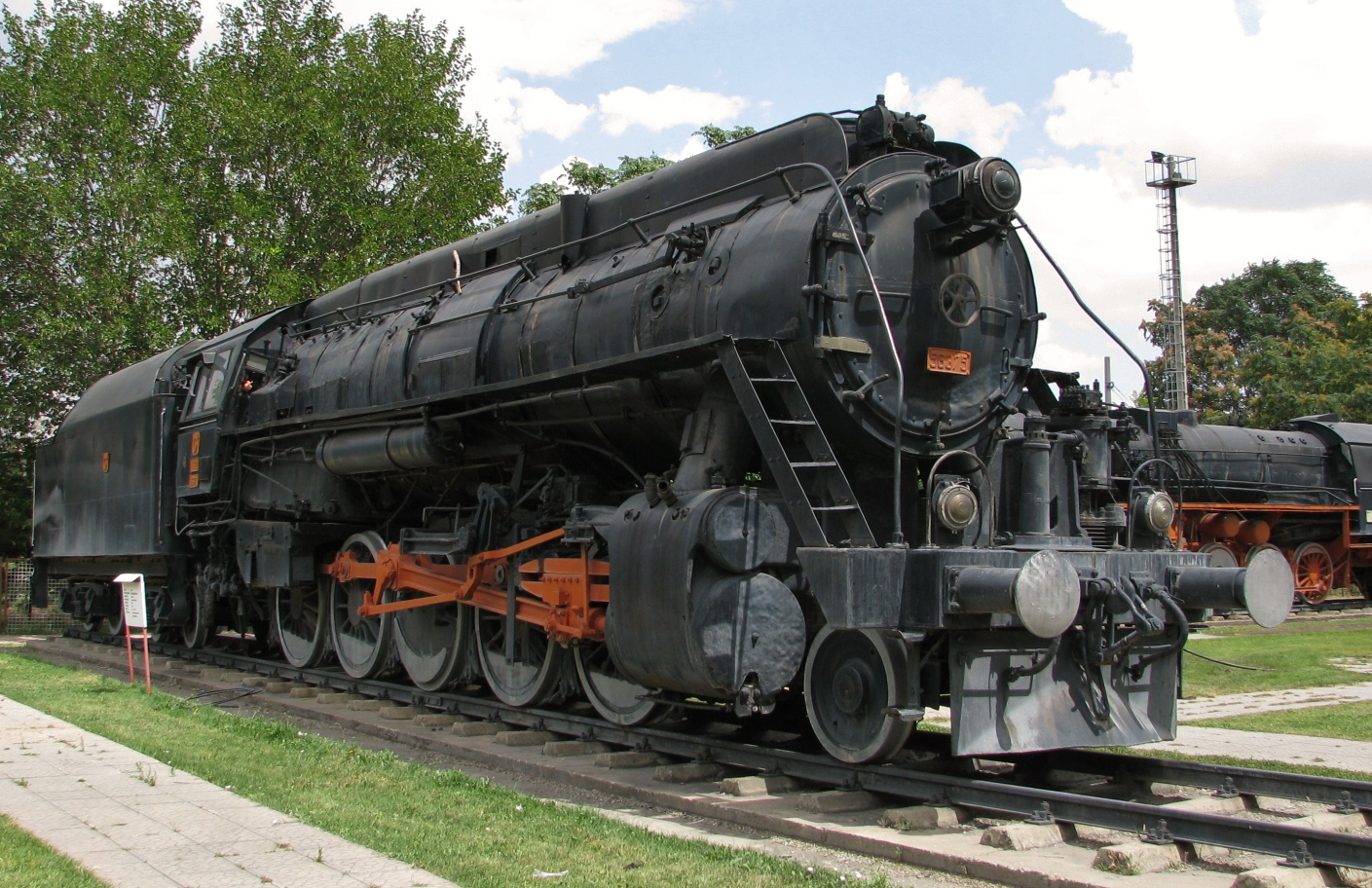
Type and origin
- Power type: Steam
- Builder: Vulcan Iron Works
- Serial number: 4790-4877
- Build date: 1947-1949
- Total produced: 88
Specifications
- Configuration
  - Whyte: 2-10-0
  - UIC: 1′E h2
- Gauge: 1,435 mm (4 ft 8 1/2 in)
- Driver dia.: 1450 mm
- Wheelbase
  - Coupled: 6808 mm
- Loco weight: 101,9
- Tender weight: 32,7
- Fuel type: coal
- Fuel capacity: 12,7 ton
- Water cap.: 30,2 m3
- Boiler pressure: 17,6 bar
- Cylinder size: 600 mm × 711 mm (23 5/8 in × 28 in)
Performance figures
- Maximum speed: 70 km/h
- Power output: 2350 hp
Career
- Numbers: 56301 - 56388
- Nicknames: Skyliners
- Preserved: 4, with remains of 2 more for parts

The Turkish State Railways (TCDD) 56301 Class is a class of 2-10-0 steam locomotives known as "Skyliners". They were built by Vulcan Iron Works of Wilkes-Barre, Pennsylvania. The 88 locomotives in this class were numbered 56301-88. The first arrived in 1947.

They were the first American-built locomotives ordered by TCDD, though they had acquired ex-USATC S200 Class (TCDD 46201 Class) and ex-USATC S160 Class (TCDD 45171 Class). This class had the largest boiler and firebox of any Turkish locomotive and were the only ones fitted with mechanical stokers.

At least 4 are known to be preserved, these being 56375 at the TCDD Open Air Steam Locomotive Museum in Ankara, 56337 at the Çamlık Railway Museum, 56378 at Tren Park within Karabük University, and 56359 stored serviceable at Çankırı. The remains of 56369 and 56376 are also at Çankırı, serving as parts sources for 56359.
