= Fort Collins Municipal Railway =

Coordinates: 40°35′6.67″N 105°6′13.58″W

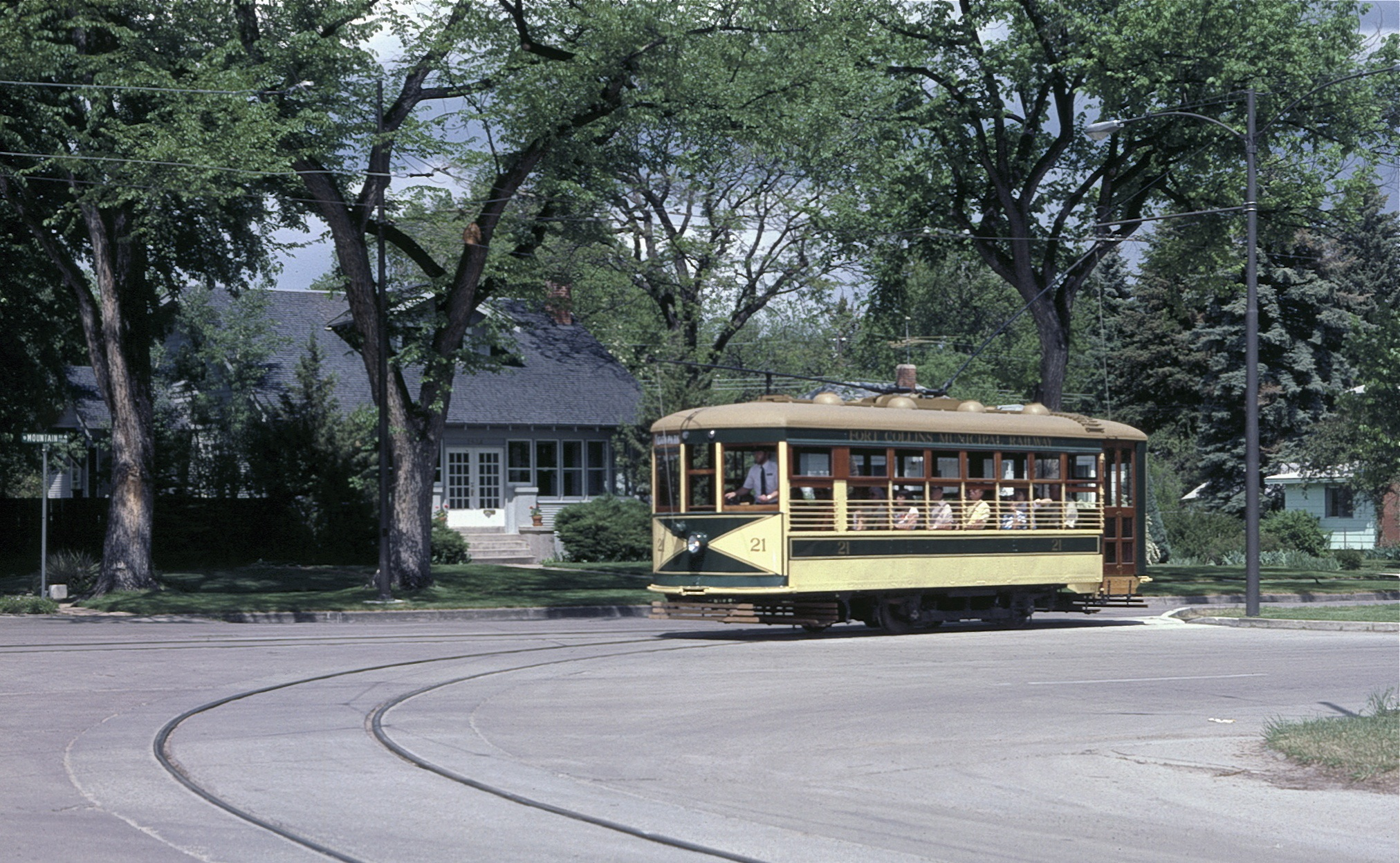
- Fort Collins Birney car 21 on the 1984-opened heritage streetcar line

Overview
- Locale: Fort Collins, Colorado
- Transit type: Heritage streetcar, seasonal
- Number of lines: 1
- Website: www.fortcollinstrolley.org

Operation
- Began operation: 1984
- Operator: Fort Collins Municipal Railway Society (FCMRS)

Technical
- System length: 1.5 miles (2.4 km)
- Track gauge: 4 ft 8 1/2 in (1,435 mm)
- Old gauge: 4 ft 8 1/2 in (1,435 mm)
- Electrification: 600 V DC, overhead wires

The Fort Collins Municipal Railway operated streetcars in Fort Collins, Colorado, from 1919 until 1951. Since 1984, a section of one of the former routes has been in operation as a seasonal heritage streetcar service, under the same name, running primarily on Spring and Summer weekends. The heritage service is operated by volunteers from the Fort Collins Municipal Railway Society (FCMRS). The streetcar in use on the heritage line, Birney "Safety" Streetcar No. 21, is listed on the National Register of Historic Places.

== History of original system ==
Evolution of the streetcar line since its inception in 1908.

1940 postcard of College Avenue and Linden Street filled with automobiles and streetcars

=== Early service and first closure ===
Electric streetcar service in Fort Collins began on December 29, 1907. The first local street railway service had actually begun on August 8, 1907, temporarily using a steam locomotive borrowed from the Colorado and Southern Railway, hauling four elderly passenger coaches, on a newly constructed single-track line along Mountain Avenue. True electric trolley/streetcar service was inaugurated with the formal dedication of the new street railway system, on December 29 of the same year. The owner and operator was the Denver and Interurban Railroad (D&I), a subsidiary of Colorado & Southern Railway. The system struggled financially, its light ridership making it no longer economically viable as a private venture. The D&I itself soon went into receivership, and abruptly ceased operation of its Fort Collins trolley system, on the night of July 10, 1918.

=== Second iteration ===
This left the town without public transportation service. It was proposed that the city purchase the system and restore service. This was approved by the city council and, in January 1919, in a vote by the citizens, and the Fort Collins Municipal Railway (FCMR) was formed. Rolling stock was not part of the deal, so four new Birney-type streetcars were purchased from the American Car Company, numbered 20–23, arriving on May 24, 1919. Within one to two weeks of that date, streetcar service in Fort Collins was restored. A fifth Birney car, No. 24, was purchased in 1920 from the Cincinnati Car Company, and in 1924 two secondhand Birneys (built in 1922 by American Car) were acquired from the Cheyenne Electric Railway Company, becoming Fort Collins cars 25–26. In the mid-1940s, cars 24 and 25 were replaced by two other Birneys, bought used from the Virginia Electric Power Company. The system operated three routes and ran on a 20-minute schedule. During its period of municipal ownership, 1919–1951, Birney-type cars made up the entire fleet, with a total of just five to seven cars (numbered in the range 20–26) on the active roster at any time. It was the last all-Birney streetcar system in North America.

By the end of service in 1951, the Fort Collins Municipal Railway was the last streetcar system in the U.S. to use any Birney cars. Operation ended on June 30, 1951, after several unprofitable years. Fort Collins was the last city in Colorado to operate streetcars. Other streetcar systems in the state included Pueblo, which ceased operation in 1948, and the Denver Tramway, which terminated streetcar service in 1950.

At least five of the seven cars were preserved by individuals or groups after the closure. Car 20 is displayed in non-operating condition at Pioneer Village in Minden, Nebraska. Car 21 was the only one to remain in Fort Collins, where it was displayed outside the Pioneer Museum, predecessor of the Fort Collins Museum.

== Restoration and heritage service ==
=== Early restoration efforts ===
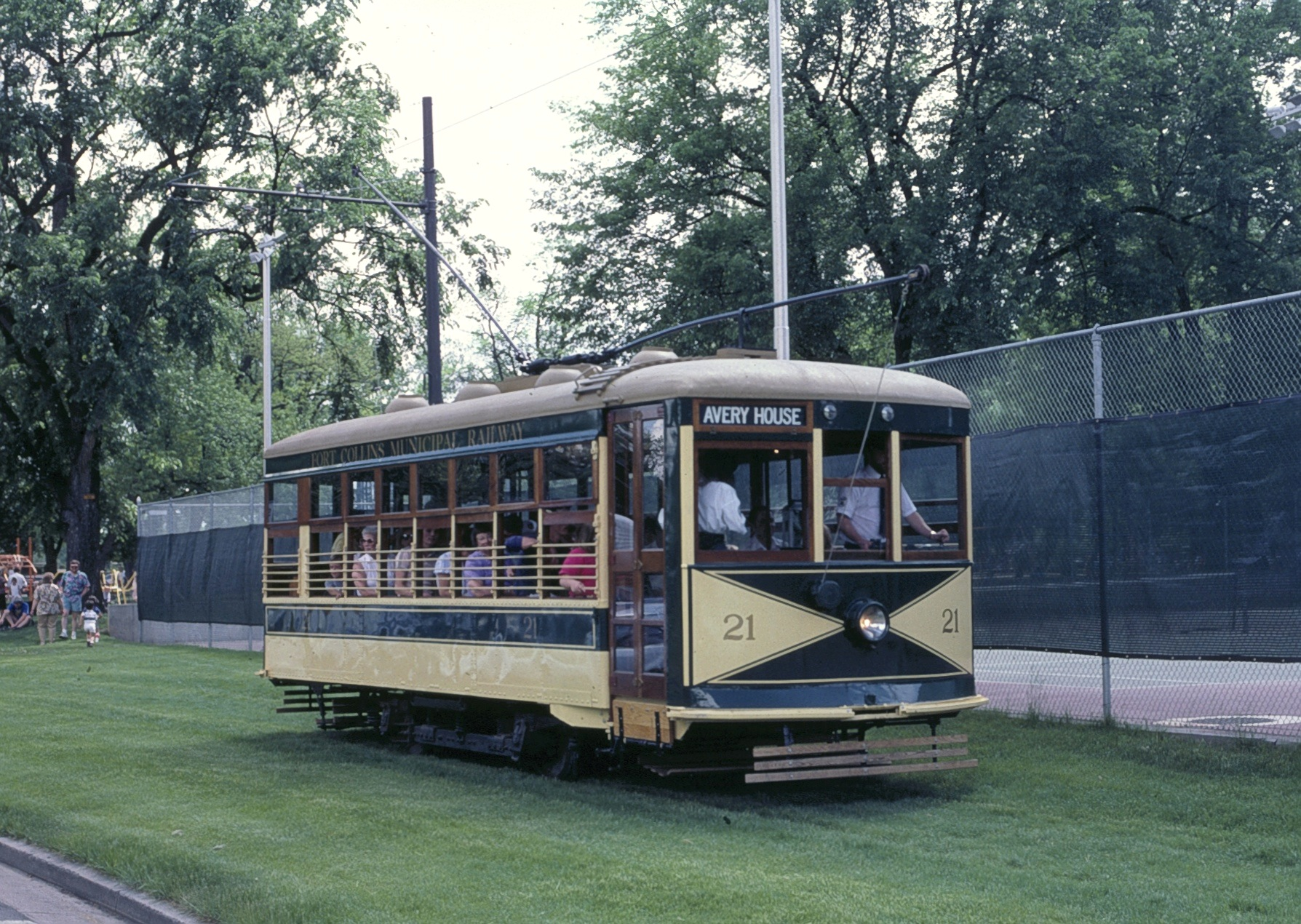
Car 21 leaving City Park (May 1987)

In 1977, the Fort Collins Junior Women's Club proposed giving 1919-built streetcar 21 a cosmetic restoration, as the car suffered from years of exposure. This proposal evolved into a more ambitious plan to restore the car to operating condition, and restore a section of the former streetcar system as an operating heritage railway. With this goal, the non-profit Fort Collins Municipal Railway Society (FCMRS) was formed on March 31, 1980. A new carbarn was built at the west end of Mountain Avenue in 1982–1983, and car 21 was moved there on August 21, 1983. Volunteers from FCMRS then began restoring car 21. Under an agreement signed in 1981, the city permitted FCMRS to restore a 1.5-mile (2.4 km) section of track along West Mountain Avenue and Roosevelt Avenue and operate the streetcar along it. The section of route chosen for restoration was part of the city's first streetcar line, opened in 1907. A substation to provide 600Vdc electric power was purchased, and overhead wires were reinstalled along the route.

Restoration of track and 1919 Birney car 21 was completed in 1984, and the first public trips on the heritage streetcar line occurred on December 29, 1984 – the 77th anniversary of the introduction of electric streetcar service in Fort Collins. Regular heritage service would operate in spring and summer, not year-round.

=== Later history and operations ===
Fort Collins Municipal Railway at Shields Street (February 2026)

The heritage line normally operates from May through September, on weekends, from Noon to 5 p.m., half-hourly.

As of 2010, car 21 is still the only streetcar that has been restored to serve the heritage line. Since 1992 the society has been working to add a second car. After delays, in 2007 FCMRS acquired another Birney car which had previously operated in Fort Collins. Number 25 was purchased by FCMRS in 2007 and was returned to Fort Collins in 2008, where restoration work began. Car 25 was originally purchased for use on the Fort Collins system in 1946, having previously been Virginia Electric Power Company (Richmond, Virginia) car 1520. It replaced the first car No. 25 in the Fort Collins fleet. After the 1951 system closure, No. 25 had been sold to a person in Woodland Park, Colorado. It was later sold in the early 1990s and moved to Charleston, South Carolina, then to Charlotte, North Carolina before being acquired by FCMRS.

One of car 21's axles broke on July 25, 2010, and service was indefinitely suspended, ultimately for the remainder of 2010. Replacement parts were obtained, and repair work and testing were completed in April 2011. Car 21 returned to service on May 1, 2011. The line remains in operation as of 2016, with the season ending September 25. On July 4, 2020, car 25 was returned to service.

=== Stations ===
The Fort Collins Municipal Railway stops at the following locations:

- Trolley Depot in City Park
- Shields Street and Mountain Avenue
- Loomis Street and Mountain Avenue
- Howes Street and Mountain Avenue

== See also ==
- List of streetcar systems in the United States (all-time list)
- Streetcars in North America
- List of Colorado historic railroads
