= West Garrison Avenue Historic District =

Historic district in Arkansas, United States

- U.S. National Register of Historic Places
- U.S. Historic district
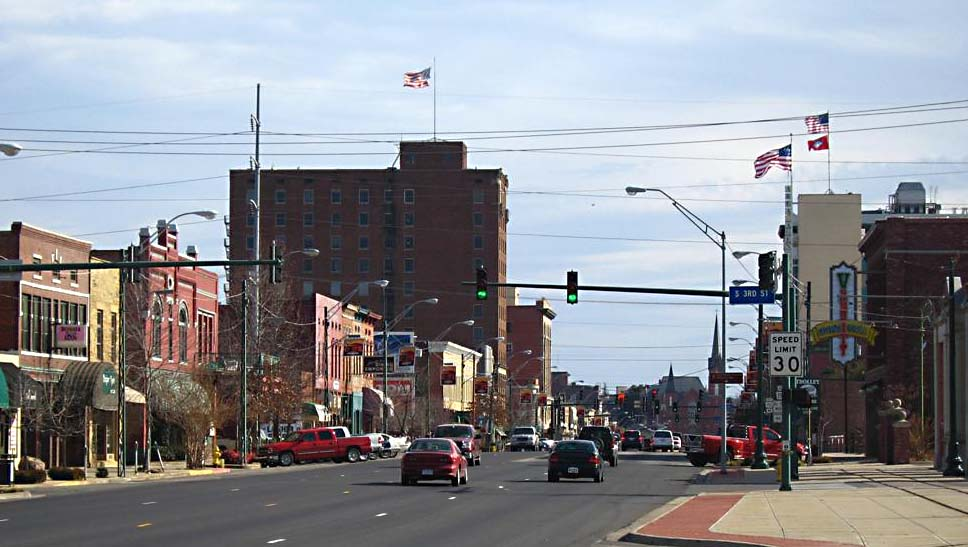

- Location within Arkansas Location within the United States
- Location: 100-525 Garrison Ave., Fort Smith, Arkansas
- Area: 107 acres (43 ha)
- Architect: Multiple
- Architectural style: Classical Revival, Late Victorian
- NRHP reference No.: 79000464 (original); 01000614 (increase)

Significant dates
- Added to NRHP: April 26, 1979
- Boundary increase: June 6, 2001

The West Garrison Avenue Historic District is a historic district encompassing the oldest commercial section of Fort Smith, Arkansas. When listed on the National Register of Historic Places in 1979, the district included just a five-block stretch of Garrison Avenue, the major east–west thoroughfare in the city and one of its oldest, dating to the city's founding in 1838. The district included more than fifty historically significant buildings built before 1912. The area was significantly affected by a major tornado in September 1996, in which thirteen historic buildings were destroyed and others damaged. The district was subsequently enlarged in 2001 to encompass 175 buildings with historic significance to 1951. These buildings are located along the length of Garrison Avenue (twelve blocks), as well as Rogers Avenue and North "A" Street, which run parallel to Garrison (north and south of it, respectively), and the connecting north–south blocks.

== See also ==
- National Register of Historic Places listings in Sebastian County, Arkansas
