= Fort Smith Museum of History =

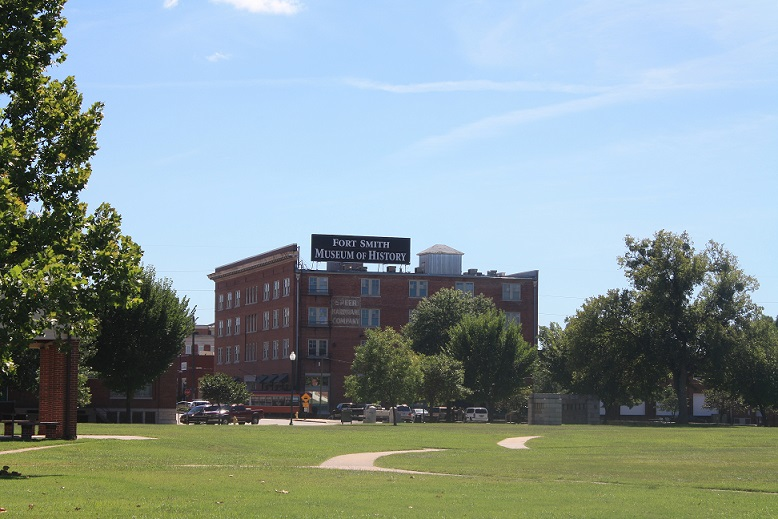

- Location within Arkansas Location within the United States
- Established: 1910
- Location: 320 Rogers Avenue; Fort Smith, Arkansas
- Type: History museum
- Website: www.fortsmithmuseum.org
- Atkinson-Williams Warehouse
- U.S. National Register of Historic Places
- Location: 320 Rogers Ave., Fort Smith, Arkansas
- Coordinates: 35°23′15″N 94°25′42″W
- Area: less than one acre
- Built: 1906
- Built by: Tillman T. Reddick
- NRHP reference No.: 79000458
- Added to NRHP: December 13, 1979

The Fort Smith Museum of History is located at 320 Rogers Avenue in Fort Smith, Arkansas. The museum is devoted to presenting the history of Fort Smith and the surrounding region. It is located near the Fort Smith National Historic Site in the former Atkinson-Williams Warehouse, built in 1906 and one of the city's oldest surviving commercial warehouse buildings. The building, a large four-story brick building with typical early-20th-century commercial styling, was listed on the National Register of Historic Places in 1979.

== See also ==
- National Register of Historic Places listings in Sebastian County, Arkansas
