= American Car Company =

- Company type: Subsidiary
- Industry: Rail transport
- Founded: 1891; 135 years ago
- Defunct: 1931; 95 years ago
- Fate: Defunct
- Successor: J. G. Brill of Missouri
- Headquarters: St. Louis, Missouri, U.S.
- Area served: United States
- Products: Streetcars
- Owner: J. G. Brill Company (from 1902)

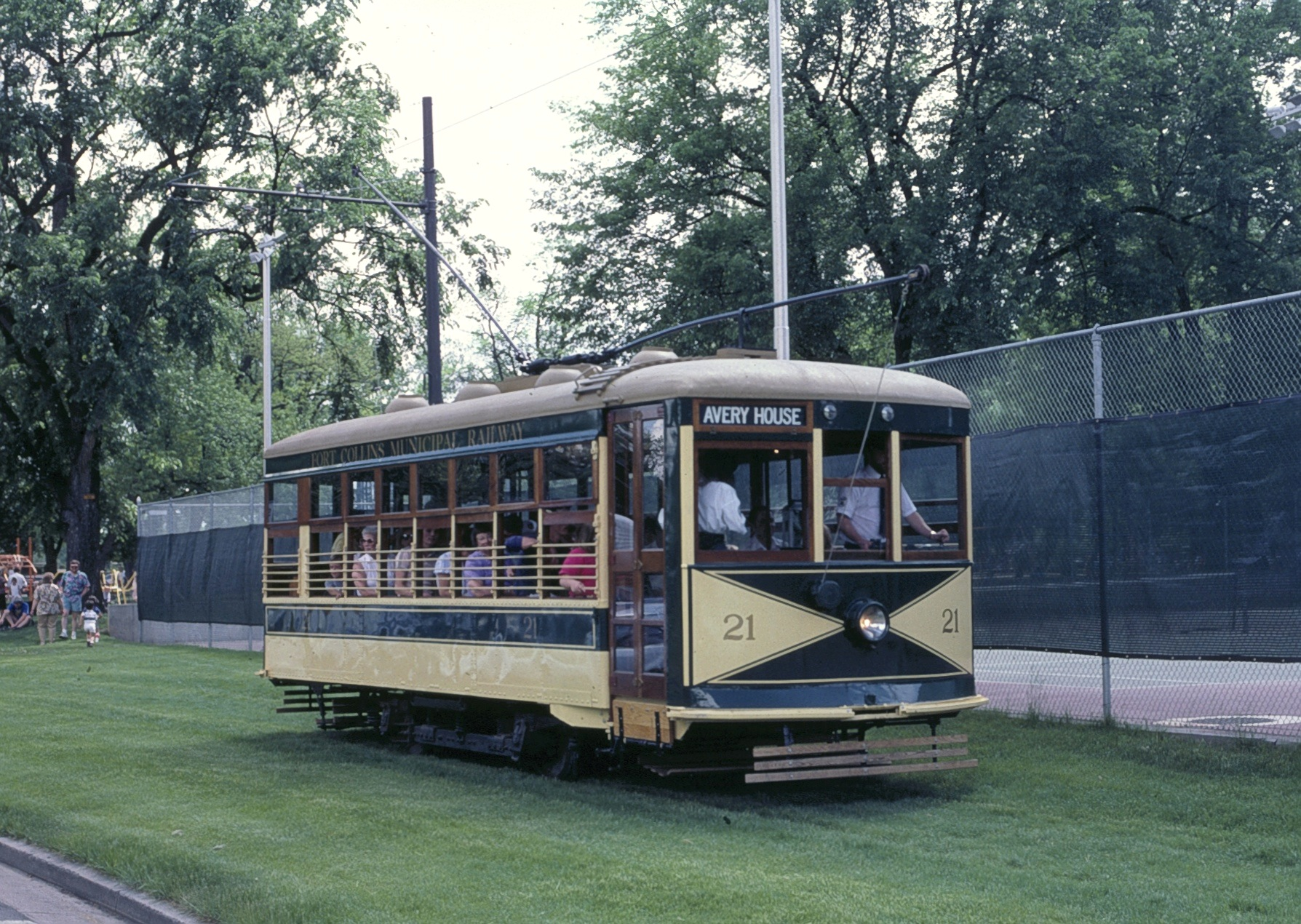
A Birney car made by the American Car Company, built in 1919, shown here in operation in 1987

The American Car Company was a streetcar manufacturing company based in St. Louis, Missouri, United States. It was one of the country's leading streetcar builders during the heyday of streetcar operation. The company was founded in 1891 by William Sutton and Emil Alexander, who had previously founded the Laclede Car Company in 1883 also in St. Louis, and had both got their start working in the streetcar business at St. Louis' horsecar manufacturer, the Brownell Car Company.

The American Car Company was a builder of electric powered streetcars. ACC was bought out by the J. G. Brill Company of Philadelphia in 1902. However, Brill continued to operate the American Car Co. under its own name until 1931, when it was reorganized as J. G. Brill of Missouri.

In 1915, American Car built the very first Birney-type trolley, the prototype of a new design then known as the "Safety Car", and went on to build more Birney cars than any other manufacturer. The Fort Collins Municipal Railway, in Colorado, and the Fort Smith Trolley Museum, in Arkansas, are examples of operations where preserved Birney cars built by the American Car Company can still be seen running today.

In 1931, only four months after parent company J. G. Brill discontinued use of the American Car Company name, the ex-ACC factory in St. Louis closed permanently.

Cars from American Car Company are on display as part of the collections for the Phoenix Trolley Museum and Fox River Trolley Museum.

== See also ==
- Birney Safety Streetcar No. 224
- American Car and Foundry Company
- List of tram builders
