= Motorman (rail transportation) =

Operator of a train

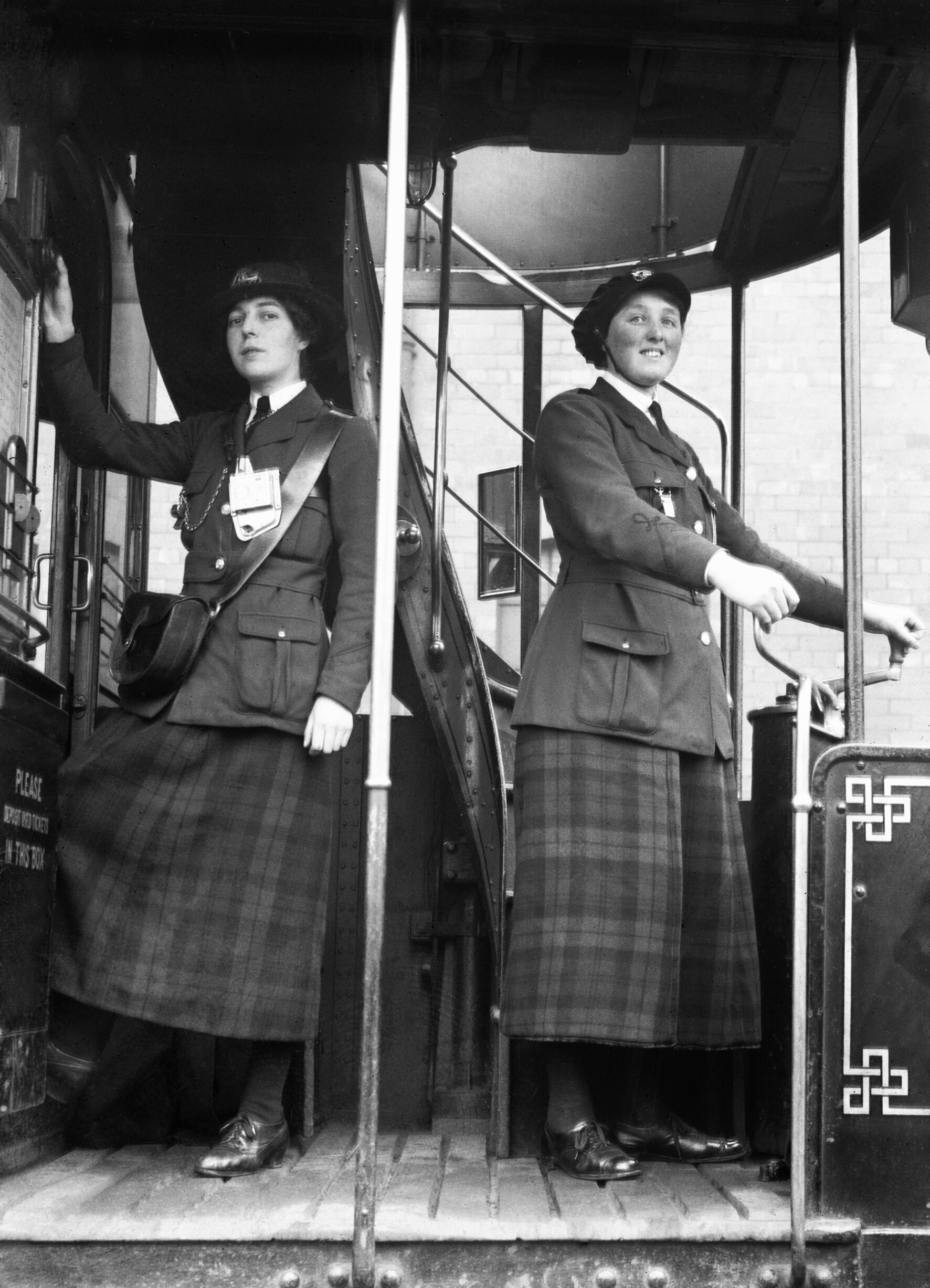
A tram driver (right) and conductor, Glasgow, 1918

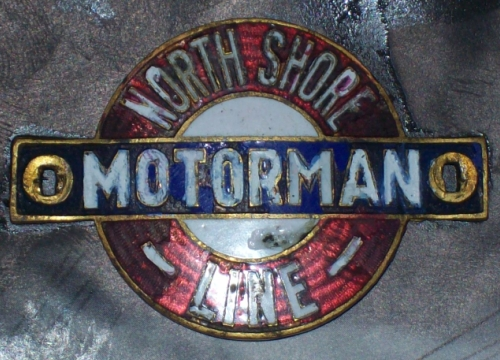
Hat pin from motorman on the Chicago, North Shore and Milwaukee railroad

A motorman is a person who operates a tram (streetcar), light rail, or rapid transit train. A motorman is in charge of operating their train, applying power to traction motors, in the same sense as a railroad engineer is in charge of the engine.

The term was and, where still used, is gender-neutral. Though motormen have historically been men, women in the position (first appearing in the United States during the World Wars) were usually also called motormen as a job title. Twin City Lines adopted the diminutive "motorette" for their women employees. The term has been replaced by more neutral ones, as gender-specific job titles have fallen into disuse.

On systems such as the New York City Subway and London Underground, the position is now called "train operator" (T/O). After transitioning to one-person operation on the Chicago "L", use of "operator" came as a replacement term after motormen assumed additional responsibilities previously held by the conductors.

The operator of an electric locomotive or electric multiple unit on a commuter or mainline railroad is typically called an engineer, operator, or driver.

The term may also refer to a person on a locomotive-hauled train when the train is being propelled by the locomotive. The driver is responsible for applying power in the locomotive, while the motorman (usually in a specially-built or converted vehicle) at the front of the train, is responsible for obeying signals, sounding the horn, and applying the brakes where necessary.
