= List of county courthouses in Arkansas =

This is a list of county courthouses in Arkansas. Each county in Arkansas has a city that is the county seat where the county government resides, including a county courthouse. Arkansas also has ten counties which have two county seats and two county courthouses. This is usually due to a capricious river that runs across the county which became impassable at some point in county history.

Picture	Courthouse	County	Location
	North Arkansas County Courthouse	Arkansas County	34°29′59″N 91°33′6″W; 302 S. College Street; Stuttgart, Arkansas
	South Arkansas County Courthouse	Arkansas County	34°17′42″N 91°20′6″W; Courthouse Square; De Witt, Arkansas
	Ashley County Courthouse	Ashley County	33.227342°N 91.795962°W; 215 E Jefferson St; Hamburg, Arkansas
	Baxter County Courthouse	Baxter County	36°20′7″N 92°23′5″W; Courthouse Square; Mountain Home, Arkansas
	Benton County Courthouse	Benton County	36°22′21″N 94°12′27″W; 106 SE A Street; Bentonville, Arkansas
	Boone County Courthouse	Boone County	36°13′49″N 93°6′29″W; Courthouse Square; Harrison, Arkansas
	Bradley County Courthouse and Clerk's Office	Bradley County	33°36′53″N 92°3′48″W; Courthouse Square; Warren, Arkansas
	Calhoun County Courthouse	Calhoun County	33°32′15″N 92°28′19″W; Courthouse Square; Hampton, Arkansas
	East Carroll County Courthouse	Carroll County	36°21′51″N 93°34′4″W; Public Square; Berryville, Arkansas
	West Carroll County Courthouse	Carroll County	36.401532°N 93.737737°W; 4 South Main Street; Eureka Springs, Arkansas
	Chicot County Courthouse	Chicot County	33°29′0″N 91°16′55″W; 108 Main Street; Lake Village, Arkansas
	Clark County Courthouse	Clark County	34°7′6″N 93°3′3″W; 401 Clay Street; Arkadelphia, Arkansas
	East Clay County Courthouse	Clay County	36.382263°N 90.1919°W; 151 South Second Avenue; Piggott, Arkansas
	West Clay County Courthouse	Clay County	36.404565°N 90.583886°W; 800 West Second Street; Corning, Arkansas
	Cleburne County Courthouse	Cleburne County	35°29′27″N 92°1′55″W; Courthouse Square; Heber Springs, Arkansas
	Cleveland County Courthouse	Cleveland County	33°57′33″N 92°11′4″W; Main and Magnolia Sts; Rison, Arkansas
	Columbia County Courthouse	Columbia County	33°16′1″N 93°14′27″W; Court Square; Magnolia, Arkansas
	Conway County Courthouse	Conway County	35°9′5″N 92°44′37″W; 117 S. Moose Street; Morrilton, Arkansas
	East Craighead County Courthouse	Craighead County	35.817414°N 90.432165°W; 405 Court Street; Lake City, Arkansas
	West Craighead County Courthouse	Craighead County	35°50′14″N 90°42′18″W; 511 Main Street; Jonesboro, Arkansas
	Crawford County Courthouse	Crawford County	35.434079°N 94.356168°W; 300 Main Street; Van Buren, Arkansas
	Crittenden County Courthouse	Crittenden County	35°12′57″N 90°11′45″W; 85 Jackson Street; Marion, Arkansas
	Cross County Courthouse	Cross County	35.223557°N 90.787049°W; 705 East Union Street; Wynne, Arkansas
	Dallas County Courthouse	Dallas County	33°48′45″N 92°24′49″W; 3rd and Oak Streets; Fordyce, Arkansas
	Desha County Courthouse	Desha County	33°36′33″N 91°12′8″W; Robert S. Moore Avenue; Arkansas City, Arkansas
	Drew County Courthouse	Drew County	33°37′36″N 91°47′29″W; 210 S. Main Street; Monticello, Arkansas
	Faulkner County Courthouse	Faulkner County	35°5′20″N 92°26′34″W; 801 Locust St. Conway, Arkansas
Franklin County Courthouse, Ozark, AR	North Franklin County Courthouse	Franklin County	35°29′11″N 93°49′36″W; 211 W. Commercial Street; Ozark, Arkansas
Franklin County Courthouse, Charleston, AR	South Franklin County Courthouse	Franklin County	35°29′11.50″N 93°49′38.33″W; Arkansas Highway 22; Charleston, Arkansas
	Fulton County Courthouse	Fulton County	36°22′14.4″N 91°49′23.6″W; Court Square; Salem, Arkansas
	Garland County Courthouse	Garland County	34°30′17″N 93°3′32″W; Ouachita and Hawthorne Aves; Hot Springs, Arkansas
	Grant County Courthouse	Grant County	34.306811°N 92.400332°W; 101 West Center Street; Sheridan, Arkansas
	Greene County Courthouse	Greene County	36°3′14″N 90°29′12″W; 320 Court Street; Paragould, Arkansas
	Hempstead County Courthouse	Hempstead County	200 East Third Street; Hope, Arkansas
	Hot Spring County Courthouse	Hot Springs County	34°21′46″N 92°48′53″W; 210 Locust Street; Malvern, Arkansas
	Howard County Courthouse	Howard County	33°56′52″N 93°50′51″W; 421 North Main Street; Nashville, Arkansas
	Independence County Courthouse	Independence County	35.770537°N 91.653215°W; 192 E. Main Street; Batesville, Arkansas
	Izard County Courthouse	Izard County	36°3′31″N 91°54′20″W; Arkansas Highway 69 on Courthouse Square; Melbourne, Arkansas
	Jackson County Courthouse	Jackson County	35°36′13″N 91°16′58″W; US Route 67; Newport, Arkansas
	Jefferson County Courthouse	Jefferson County	34.229408°N 92.003282°W; 101 East Barraque Street; Pine Bluff, Arkansas
	Johnson County Courthouse	Johnson County	35°28′15″N 93°27′53″W; 215 W. Main Street; Clarksville, Arkansas
	Lafayette County Courthouse	Lafayette County	33°21′26″N 93°34′36″W; Bounded by 3rd, Spruce, 4th, and Maple Streets; Lewisville, Arkansas
	Lawrence County Courthouse	Lawrence County	36.070232°N 90.957635°W; 315 West Main Street; Walnut Ridge, Arkansas
	Lee County Courthouse	Lee County	34°46′28″N 90°45′25″W; 15 E. Chestnut Street; Marianna, Arkansas
	Lincoln County Courthouse	Lincoln County	33°56′22″N 91°50′40″W; 300 S. Drew Street; Star City, Arkansas
	Little River County Courthouse	Little River County	33°40′20″N 94°7′58″W; Main and 2nd Streets; Ashdown, Arkansas
	North Logan County Courthouse	Logan County	35°17′32″N 93°43′48″W; Courthouse Square; Paris, Arkansas
	South Logan County Courthouse	Logan County	35°4′8″N 93°55′13″W; 366 N. Broadway Avenue; Booneville, Arkansas
	Lonoke County Courthouse	Lonoke County	34°47′9″N 91°53′57″W; 301 N. Center Street; Lonoke, Arkansas
	Madison County Courthouse	Madison County	36°5′14″N 93°44′11″W; N. Center Street; Huntsville, Arkansas
	Marion County Courthouse	Marion County	36°13′33″N 92°40′55″W; Courthouse Square; Yellville, Arkansas
	Miller County Courthouse	Miller County	33°25′35″N 94°02′18″W; 400 Laurel Street; Texarkana, Arkansas
	North Mississippi County Courthouse	Mississippi County	35°55′43″N 89°54′16″W; 200 W. Walnut Street; Blytheville, Arkansas
	South Mississippi County Courthouse	Mississippi County	35°42′11″N 89°58′9″W; Hale and Poplar Avenues; Osceola, Arkansas
	Monroe County Courthouse	Monroe County	34°41′33″N 91°18′51″W; Courthouse Square; Clarendon, Arkansas
	Montgomery County Courthouse	Montgomery County	34°33′28″N 93°37′56″W; Court Square; Mount Ida, Arkansas
	Nevada County Courthouse	Nevada County	33.800547°N 93.38069°W; 215 E 2nd Street South; Prescott, Arkansas
	Newton County Courthouse	Newton County	36°0′29″N 93°11′13″W; Courthouse Square; Jasper, Arkansas
	Ouachita County Courthouse	Ouachita County	33°35′4″N 92°49′49″W; 145 Jefferson Avenue; Camden, Arkansas
	Perry County Courthouse	Perry County	35°0′19″N 92°48′7″W; Main and Pine Streets; Perryville, Arkansas
	Phillips County Courthouse	Phillips County	34°31′42″N 90°35′6″W; 622 Cherry Street; Helena-West Helena, Arkansas
	Pike County Courthouse	Pike County	34°3′43″N 93°41′23″W; Courthouse Square; Murfreesboro, Arkansas
	Poinsett County Courthouse	Poinsett County	35°33′47″N 90°43′2″W; Bounded by Market, East, Court, and Main Streets; Harrisburg, Arkansas
	Polk County Courthouse	Polk County	34°35′12″N 94°14′21″W; 507 Church Street; Mena, Arkansas
	Pope County Courthouse	Pope County	35.278128°N 93.133744°W; 100 West Main Street; Russellville, Arkansas
	North Prarire County Courthouse	Prairie County	34°58′39″N 91°29′39″W; Main Street; Des Arc, Arkansas
	South Prarire County Courthouse	Prairie County	34°46′59″N 91°27′44″W; Junction of Magnolia and Prairie Streets; De Valls Bluff, Arkansas
	Pulaski County Courthouse	Pulaski County	34°44′57″N 92°16′32″W; 405 W. Markham Street; Little Rock, Arkansas
	Randolph County Courthouse	Randolph County	36°15′39″N 90°58′16″W; Southwestern corner of the junction of Broadway and N. Marr Streets; Pocahontas, Arkansas
	St. Francis County Courthouse	St. Francis County	35.0079°N 90.783448°W; 313 S Izard Street; Forrest City, Arkansas
	Saline County Courthouse	Saline County	34°33′53″N 92°35′15″W; Courthouse Square; Benton, Arkansas
	Scott County Courthouse	Scott County	34°54′2.94″N 94°5′35.03″W; 190 W. 1st Street; Waldron, Arkansas
	Searcy County Courthouse	Searcy County	35°54′34″N 92°37′55″W; Courthouse Square; Marshall, Arkansas
	Sebastian County Courthouse, Fort Smith District	Sebastian County	35°23′8″N 94°25′34″W; 100 S. 6th Street; Fort Smith, Arkansas
	Sebastian County Courthouse, Greenwood District	Sebastian County	35.212403°N 94.253265°W; 301 East Center Street; Greenwood, Arkansas
	Sevier County Courthouse	Sevier County	35.212403°N 94.253265°W; 115 North 3rd Street; De Queen, Arkansas
	Sharp County Courthouse	Sharp County	36.227734°N 91.606928°W; 718 Ash Flat Drive; Ash Flat, Arkansas
	Stone County Courthouse	Stone County	35°52′8″N 92°7′5″W; Courthouse Square; Mountain View, Arkansas
	Union County Courthouse	Union County	33°12′43″N 92°39′50″W; Union Square; El Dorado, Arkansas
	Van Buren County Courthouse	Van Buren County	35°35′33″N 92°27′28″W; Junction of Griggs and Main Streets; Clinton, Arkansas
	Washington County Courthouse	Washington County	36.06586°N 94.157081°W; 280 North College Avenue; Fayetteville, Arkansas
	White County Courthouse	White County	36.06586°N 94.157081°W; Court Square; Searcy, Arkansas
	Woodruff County Courthouse	Woodruff County	35°17′15″N 91°21′52″W; 500 N. 3rd Street; Augusta, Arkansas
	Yell County Courthouse, Danville District	Yell County	35.057449°N 93.391490°W; 101 E 5th Street; Danville, Arkansas
	Yell County Courthouse, Dardanelle District	Yell County	35°13′26″N 93°9′23″W; 209 Union Street; Dardanelle, Arkansas

== Former county courthouses ==
- Hempstead County Courthouse
- Jackson County Courthouse, now contained within Jacksonport State Park
- Randolph County Courthouse
- Scott County Courthouse, replaced in 1996
- Washington County Courthouse, replaced in 1994

== See also ==
- List of United States federal courthouses in Arkansas
