= Frank Gibb =

Frank Gibb may refer to:

- Frank W. Gibb (died 1932), American architect
- Frank Gibb (cricketer) (1868–1957), English cricketer
