= Yell County Courthouse =

- U.S. National Register of Historic Places
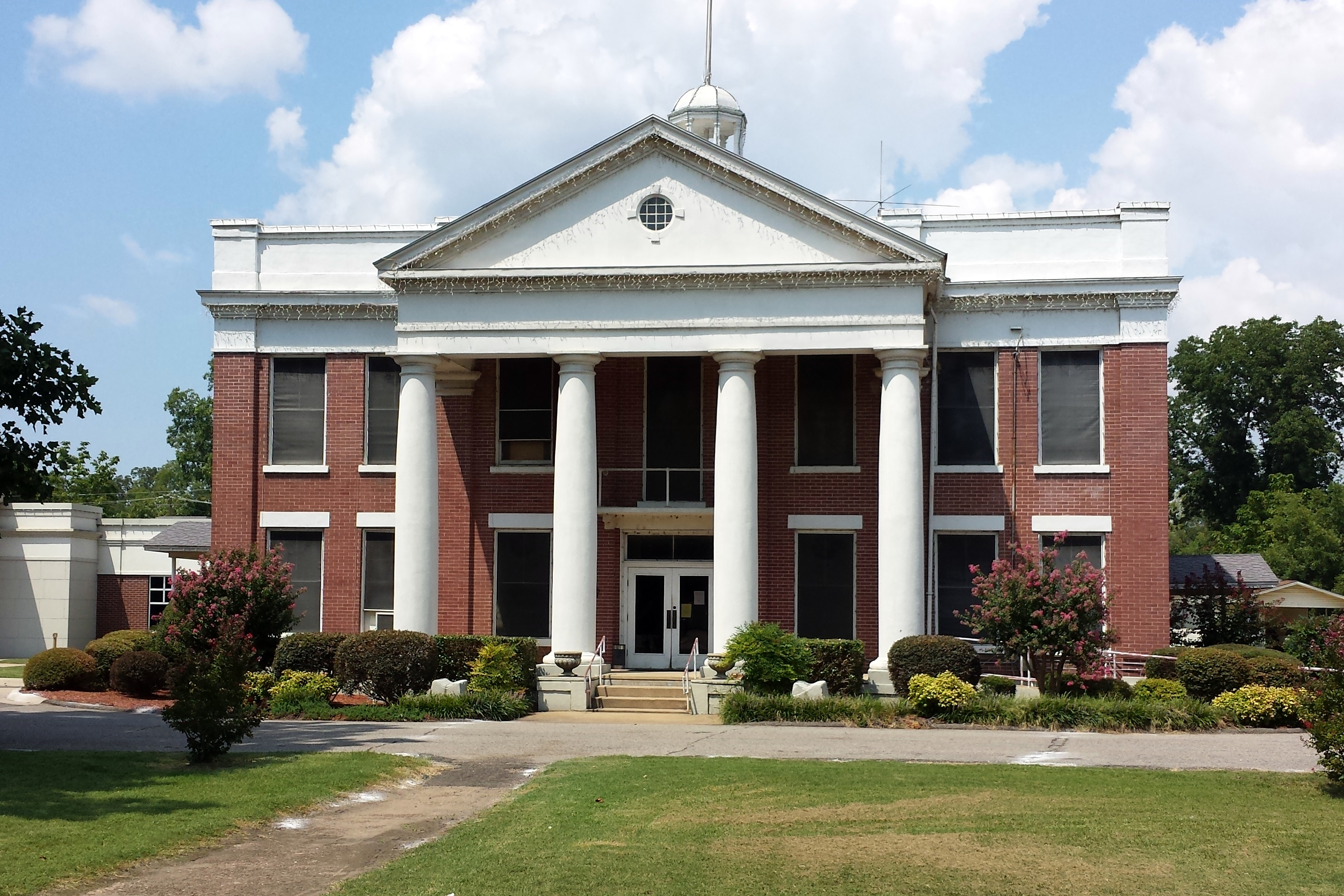

- Location within Arkansas Location within the United States
- Interactive map showing the location of Yell County Courthouse
- Location: 209 Union St., Dardanelle, Arkansas
- Coordinates: 35°13′26″N 93°9′23″W
- Area: 1 acre (0.40 ha)
- Built: 1914
- Built by: L. R. Wight and Company
- Architect: Frank W. Gibb
- Architectural style: Classical Revival
- NRHP reference No.: 92001176
- Added to NRHP: September 8, 1992

The Yell County Courthouse is a courthouse in Dardanelle, Arkansas, United States, one of two county seats of Yell County, built in 1914. It was listed on the National Register of Historic Places in 1992. The courthouse is the second building to serve the Dardanelle district of Yell County.

== History ==
Yell County was founded from portions of Scott and Pope counties in 1840. A courthouse was established at Monrovia, but was soon relocated to Danville to be more centrally located. Following the Civil War in 1875, Dardanelle was made a second county seat. Arkansas has ten counties with dual county seats. A commercial building on Front Street between Green and Oak Streets in Dardanelle was made into the district's first courthouse in 1875, and a jail was built close by. The courthouse burned on April 12, 1912, leading the county to buy a new plot of land on Union Street. Yell County contracted architect Frank W. Gibb, who in his lifetime designed 60 courthouses in Arkansas as well as the Arkansas Building at the St. Louis World's Fair and the Buckstaff Bathhouse in Hot Springs, Arkansas. Contractor L.R. Wight and Company of Dallas, Texas built the structure for under $25,000 (equivalent to $804,000 today).

== Architecture ==
Similar to the Dallas County Courthouse in Fordyce built by Gibb in 1911, the building features typical details of the neoclassical style. The symmetric facade with doric columns and white trim all fit with the style. An octagonal roof ornament tops the T-shaped building.

== Confederate monument ==
The Dardanelle Confederate Monument on Union Street was erected by the United Daughters of the Confederacy (UDC) in 1921, and added to the National Register of Historic Places in 1996 as part of the Civil War Commemorative Sculpture Multiple Property Submission.

== See also ==
- Confederate monuments
- List of county courthouses in Arkansas
- National Register of Historic Places listings in Yell County, Arkansas
