= Logan County Courthouse =

Logan County Courthouse or Old Logan County Courthouse may refer to:

in the United States

(by state)

- Logan County Courthouse, Southern Judicial District, Booneville, Arkansas
- Logan County Courthouse, Eastern District, Paris, Arkansas
- Logan County Courthouse (Colorado), Sterling, Colorado
- Logan County Courthouse (Kansas), Oakley, Kansas
- Old Logan County Courthouse (Kansas), Russell Springs, Kansas
- Logan County Courthouse (North Dakota), Napoleon, North Dakota
- Logan County Courthouse (Ohio), Bellefontaine, Ohio
- Logan County Courthouse (Oklahoma), Guthrie, Oklahoma
