= Frank W. Gibb =

American architect

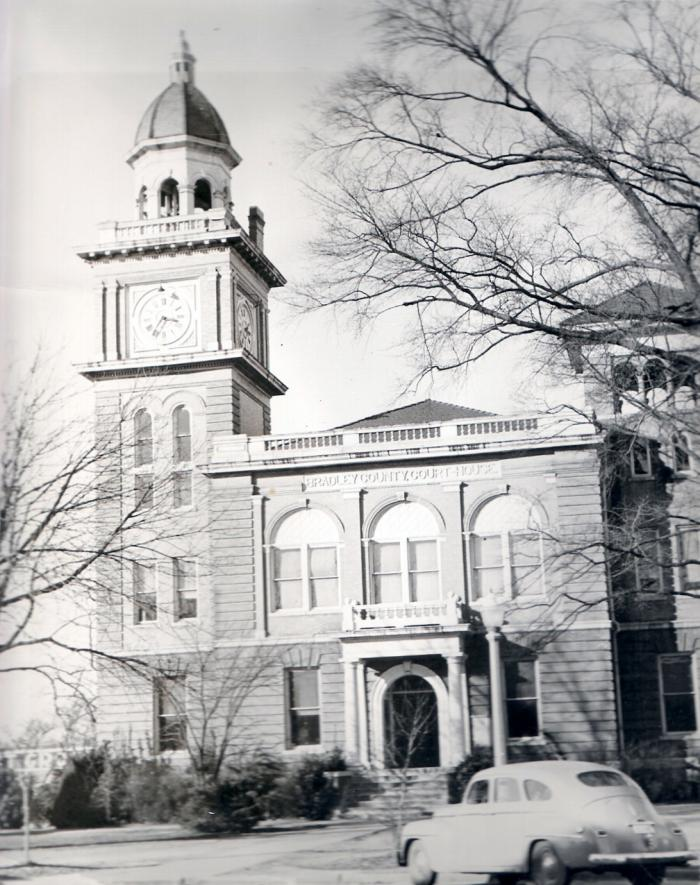
Bradley County Courthouse and Clerk's Office

Frank W. Gibb (died 1932) was an architect in Little Rock, Arkansas.

He was a member of the American Institute of Architects (AIA) during 1901–1917 He is credited with design work for 60 courthouses in Arkansas.

A number of his works are listed on the U.S. National Register of Historic Places.

Works include:

- First United Methodist Church (1899–1900), 723 Center St. Little Rock, AR, NRHP-listed
- Dr. M. C. Hawkins House (1900), 4684 AR 8 Parkdale, AR, NRHP-listed
- Ada Thompson Memorial Home (1900), designed with Theodore Sanders, 2021 S. Main Little Rock, AR, NRHP-listed
- Gregory House (1900), 300 South Second Street, Augusta, AR, NRHP-listed
- Bradley County Courthouse and Clerk's Office (1903), Courthouse Sq. Warren, AR, NRHP-listed
- Joseph Taylor Robinson House (1904), 2122 Broadway Little Rock, AR, NRHP-listed
- Calhoun County Courthouse (1909), Courthouse Sq. Hampton, AR, NRHP-listed
- Franklin County Courthouse (1904), 211 W. Commercial St. Ozark, AR, NRHP-listed
- Dallas County Courthouse (1911), 3rd and Oak Sts. Fordyce, AR, NRHP-listed
- William H. Martin House (1911–12), 815 Quapaw Ave. Hot Springs, AR, NRHP-listed
- White County Courthouse (1912 remodelling), Court Sq. Searcy, AR, NRHP-listed
- Phillips County Courthouse (1914), 622 Cherry St. Helena, AR, NRHP-listed
- Yell County Courthouse (1914), 209 Union St. Dardanelle, AR, NRHP-listed
- Franklin County Courthouse, Southern District (1923), AR 22 Charleston, AR, NRHP-listed
- Conway County Courthouse (1929), Moose St. at Church St. Morrilton, AR, NRHP-listed
