= Dallas County Courthouse =

Dallas County Courthouse may refer to:

- Dallas County Courthouse (Alabama) or Joseph T. Smitherman Historic Building
- Dallas County Courthouse (Arkansas)
- Dallas County Courthouse (Iowa)
- Dallas County Courthouse (Texas)
