= Searcy Confederate Monument =

- U.S. National Register of Historic Places
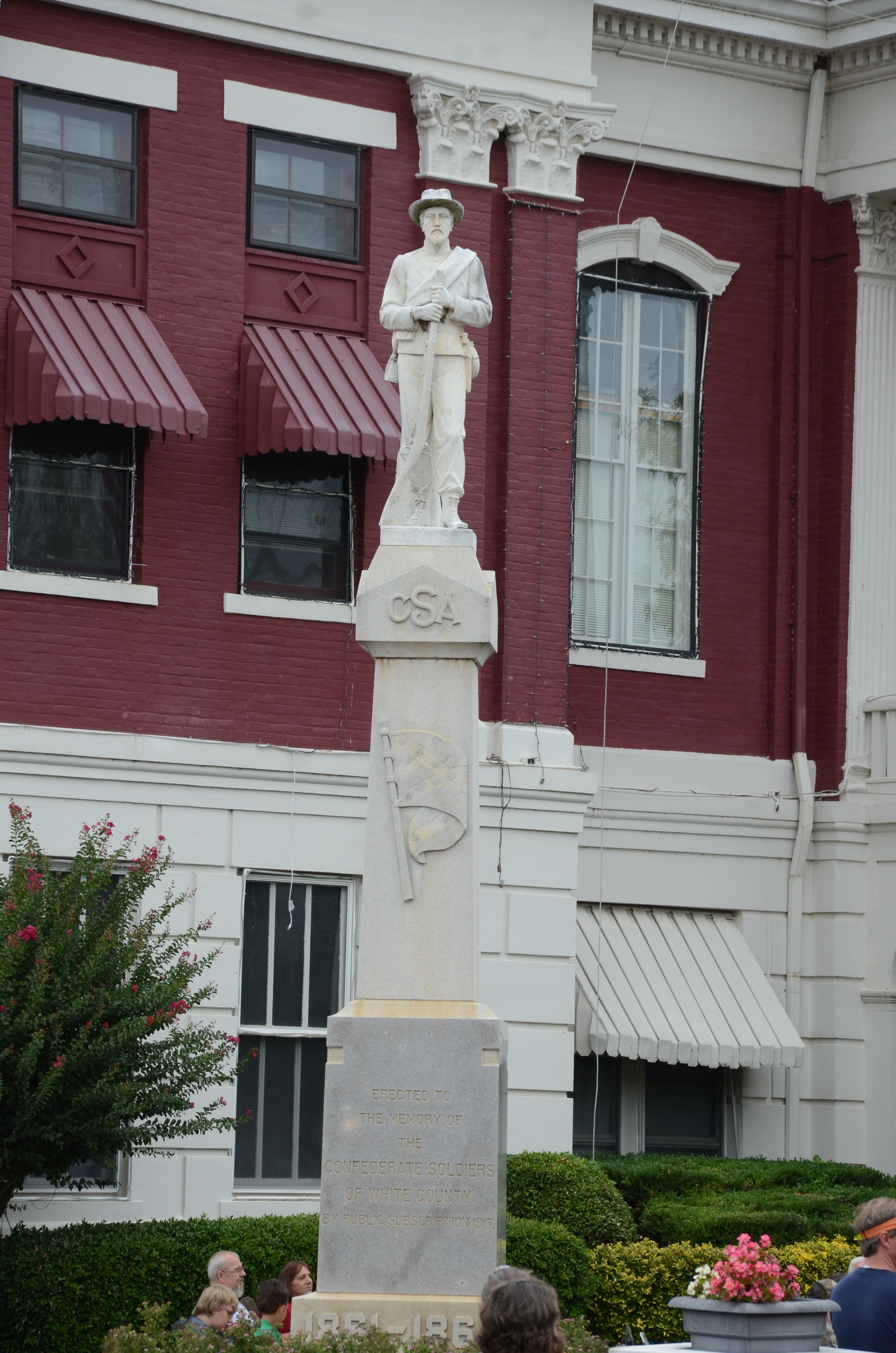

- Location within Arkansas Location within the United States
- Location: Courthouse Lawn, near jct. of W. Arch Ave. and Spring St., Searcy, Arkansas
- Coordinates: 35°15′3″N 91°44′18″W
- Area: less than one acre
- Built: 1917
- Architectural style: Classical Revival
- MPS: Civil War Commemorative Sculpture MPS
- NRHP reference No.: 96000458
- Added to NRHP: April 26, 1996

The Searcy Confederate Monument stands on the grounds of the White County Courthouse, near the corner of West Arch Avenue and Spring Streets, in Searcy, Arkansas. It is a marble statue, depicting a Confederate Army soldier, standing at rest with his rifle resting on the ground. The statue is about 6 feet (1.8 m) in height, and is mounted on a granite base that is 16 feet (4.9 m) tall and 6 feet (1.8 m) square. The base is inscribed in commemoration of White County's soldiers who served in the Confederate Army. The statue was placed in 1917; it was funded through a public fund-raising campaign.

The monument was listed on the National Register of Historic Places in 1996.

== See also ==
- National Register of Historic Places listings in White County, Arkansas
