= First United Methodist Church (Little Rock, Arkansas) =

Historic church in Arkansas, United States

- U.S. National Register of Historic Places
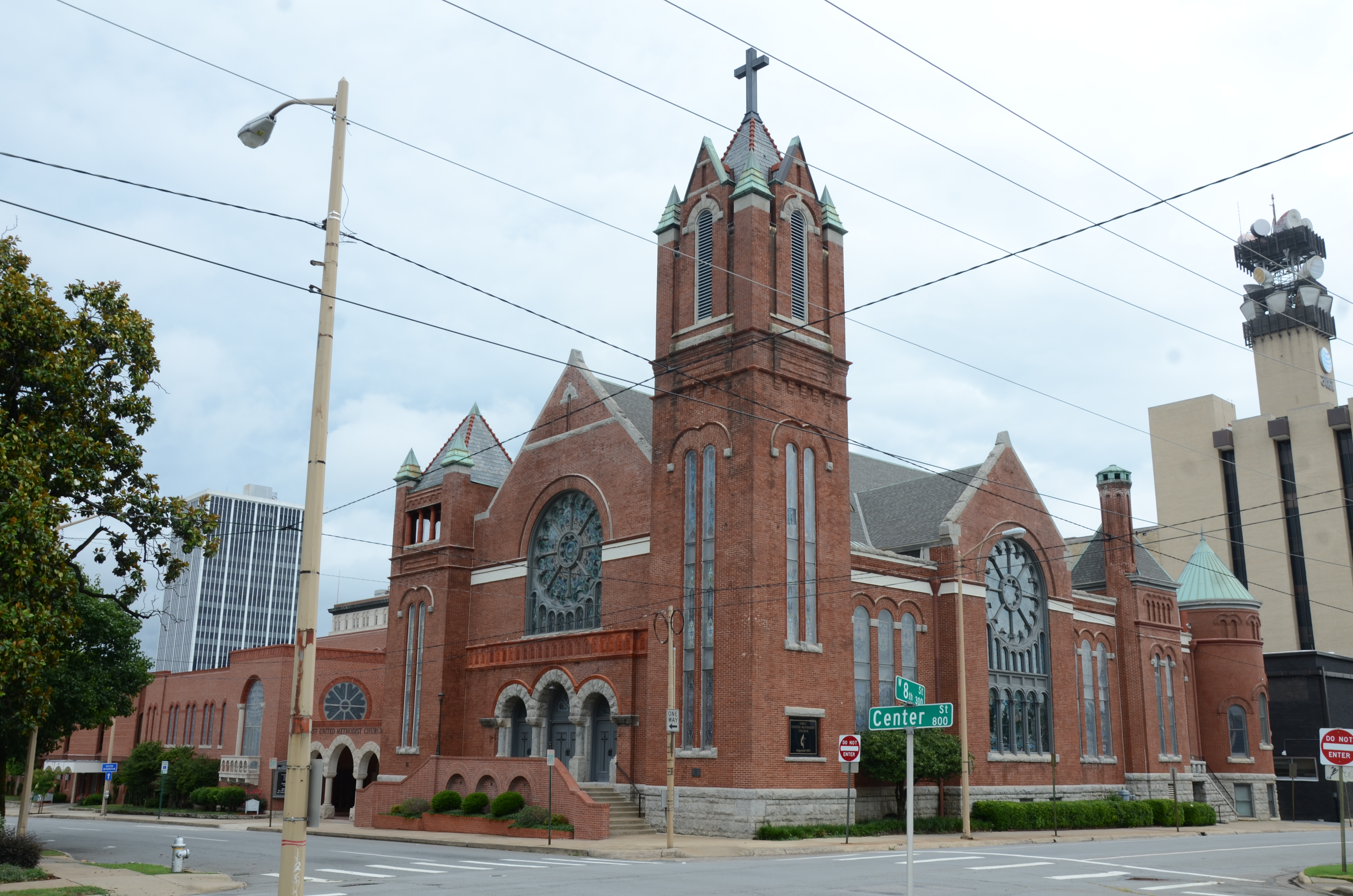

- Location within Arkansas Location within the United States
- Location: 723 Center St., Little Rock, Arkansas
- Coordinates: 34°44′30″N 92°16′25″W
- Area: less than one acre
- Built: 1896
- Architect: Frank W. Fibb
- Architectural style: Romanesque
- NRHP reference No.: 86002845
- Added to NRHP: October 9, 1986

The First United Methodist Church is a historic church at 723 Center Street in Little Rock, Arkansas. It is a large brick building, designed by Frank W. Gibb and built in 1899–1900. It is one of the city's finest examples of Romanesque Revival architecture, with square towers at its corners, and its predominantly smooth brick exterior contrasted by rusticated granite trim. The congregation, founded in 1831, is the oldest Methodist congregation in the city, and the mother congregation of many of its other Methodist establishments. Its senior pastor is the Rev. David Freeman.

The building was listed on the National Register of Historic Places in 1986.

== See also ==
- National Register of Historic Places listings in Little Rock, Arkansas
