= Bradley County Courthouse and Clerk's Office =

- U.S. National Register of Historic Places
- U.S. Historic district – Contributing property
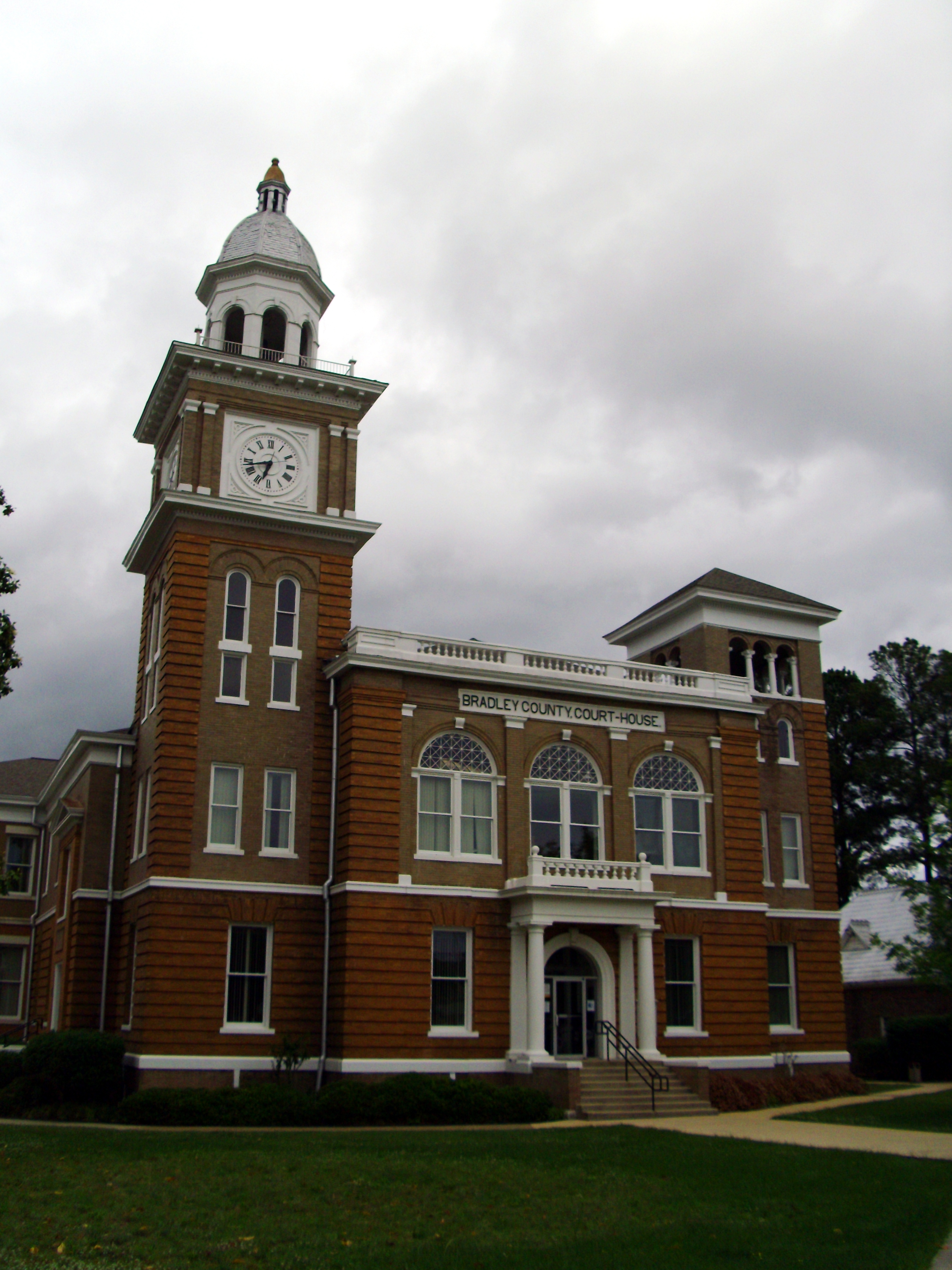
- Bradley County Courthouse

- Location within Arkansas Location within the United States
- Interactive map showing the location of Bradley County Courthouse
- Location: Courthouse Square, Warren, Arkansas
- Coordinates: 33°36′53″N 92°3′48″W
- Area: less than one acre
- Built: 1903
- Built by: E. L. Koonce
- Architect: Frank W. Gibb
- Part of: Warren Commercial Historic District (ID16000433)
- NRHP reference No.: 76000389

Significant dates
- Added to NRHP: December 12, 1976
- Designated CP: July 11, 2016

Bradley County Courthouse is a courthouse in Warren, Arkansas, United States, the county seat of Bradley County, built in 1903. It was listed on the National Register of Historic Places in 1976. The courthouse was built using two colors of brick and features a 2½ story clock tower.

== History ==
Bradley County was established in 1840 from Union County and was named for Hugh Bradley. Eventually Bradley County was fragmented into five more counties. Pennington Settlement, later renamed Warren, became the county seat around 1840. Two courthouses, a log cabin and later a brick and stucco building, were used for county business until the building of the current structure in 1903.

== Architecture ==
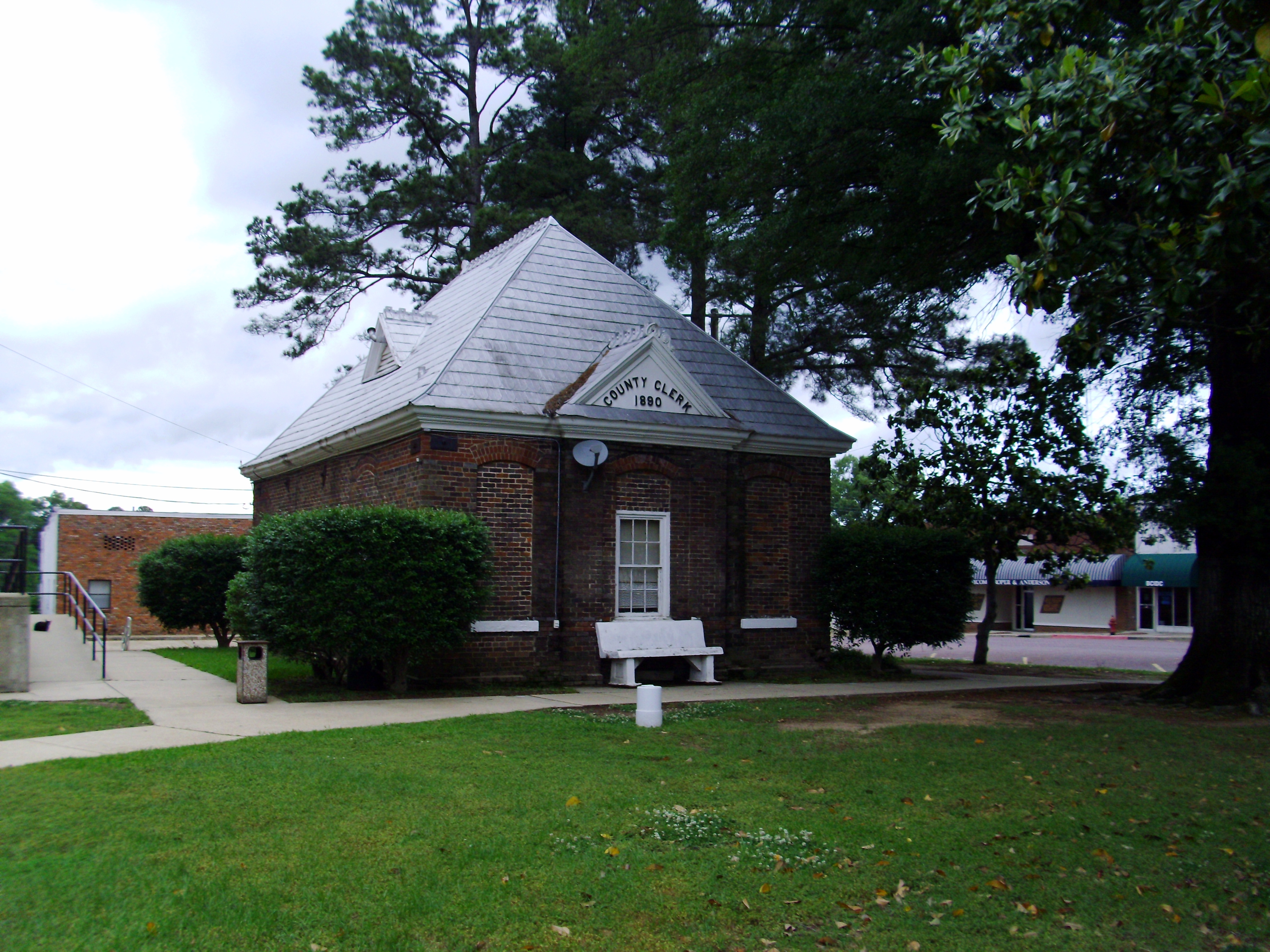
Former county clerk's office

The Bradley County Courthouse has a two-tone brick exterior with quoin arched windows as well as gauged voussoirs and dentils along the cornices. A tower in one corner of the structure has clocks facing all four directions, an arched cupola, and a hexagonal shaped roof. Also included on the National Register of Historic Places is a one-story brick building built in 1890. Originally the county clerk's office, the building now serves as a library.

== See also ==
- List of county courthouses in Arkansas
- National Register of Historic Places listings in Bradley County, Arkansas
