= Dardanelle Confederate Monument =

Coordinates: 35°13′26.5″N 93°9′19.1″W

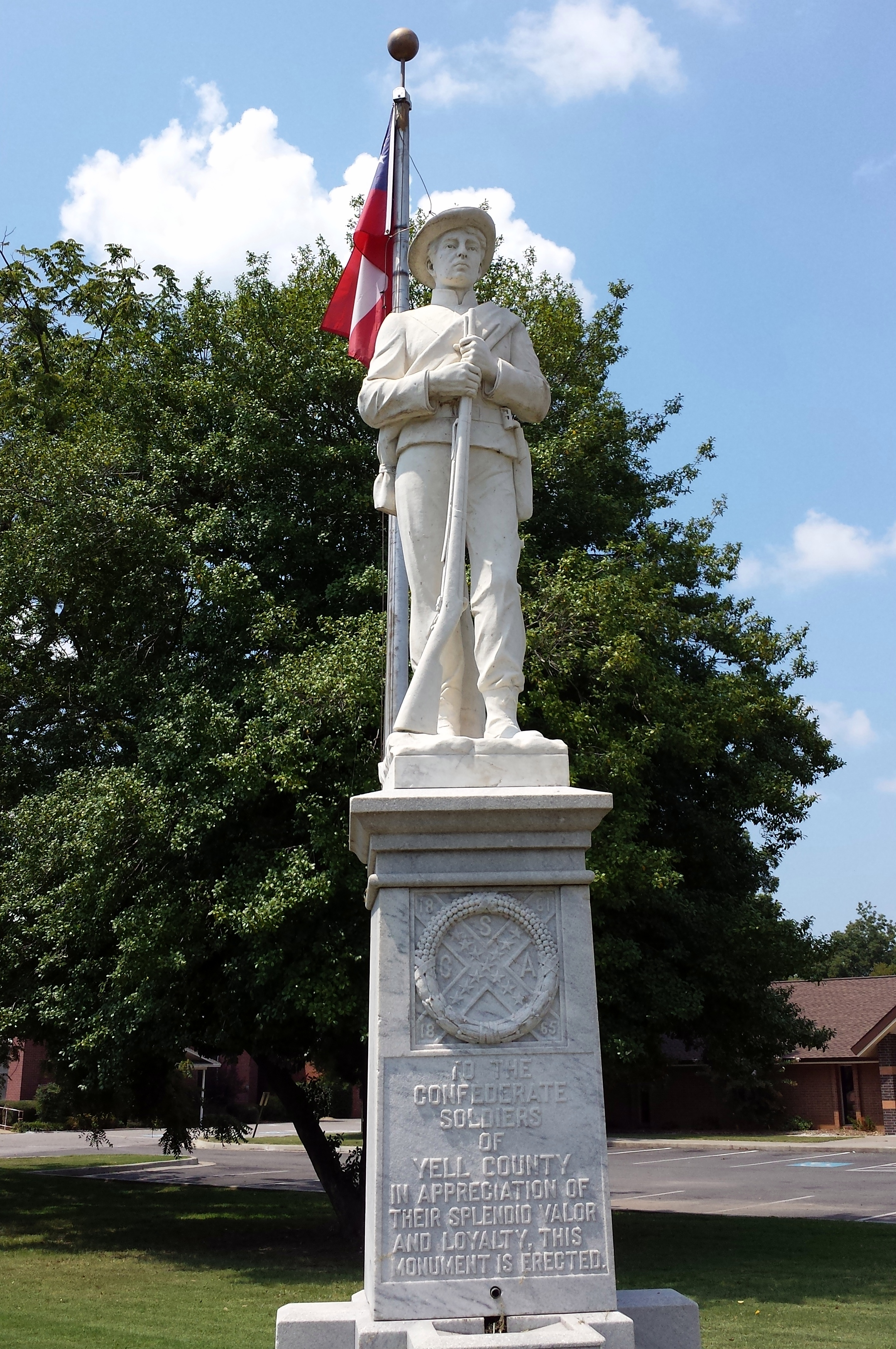
The monument in 2013

The Dardanelle Confederate Monument is located near the Yell County Courthouse on Union Street in Dardanelle, Arkansas, United States. Erected by the United Daughters of the Confederacy (UDC) in 1921, the monument was added to the National Register of Historic Places in 1996 as part of the Civil War Commemorative Sculpture Multiple Property Submission.

The UDC raised $1,760 ($31,769 today) to construct the monument between two banks in downtown Dardanelle. Following the completion of a new bridge over the Arkansas River in 1930, the UDC suggested it be moved so that "all who crossed the bridge would find themselves face to face with the image in marble of the greatest soldier in the world - the Confederate soldier." The monument was moved to the southeast corner of the courthouse grounds, where it has remained ever since. The monument formerly contained plumbing allowing it to operate as a fountain which has since been removed.

An inscription reads: "To the Confederate soldiers of Yell County, in appreciation of their splendid valor and loyalty, this monument is erected".

== See also ==
- 1921 in art
- Confederate monuments and memorials
- National Register of Historic Places listings in Yell County, Arkansas
