= Johnson County Courthouse (Arkansas) =

- U.S. National Register of Historic Places
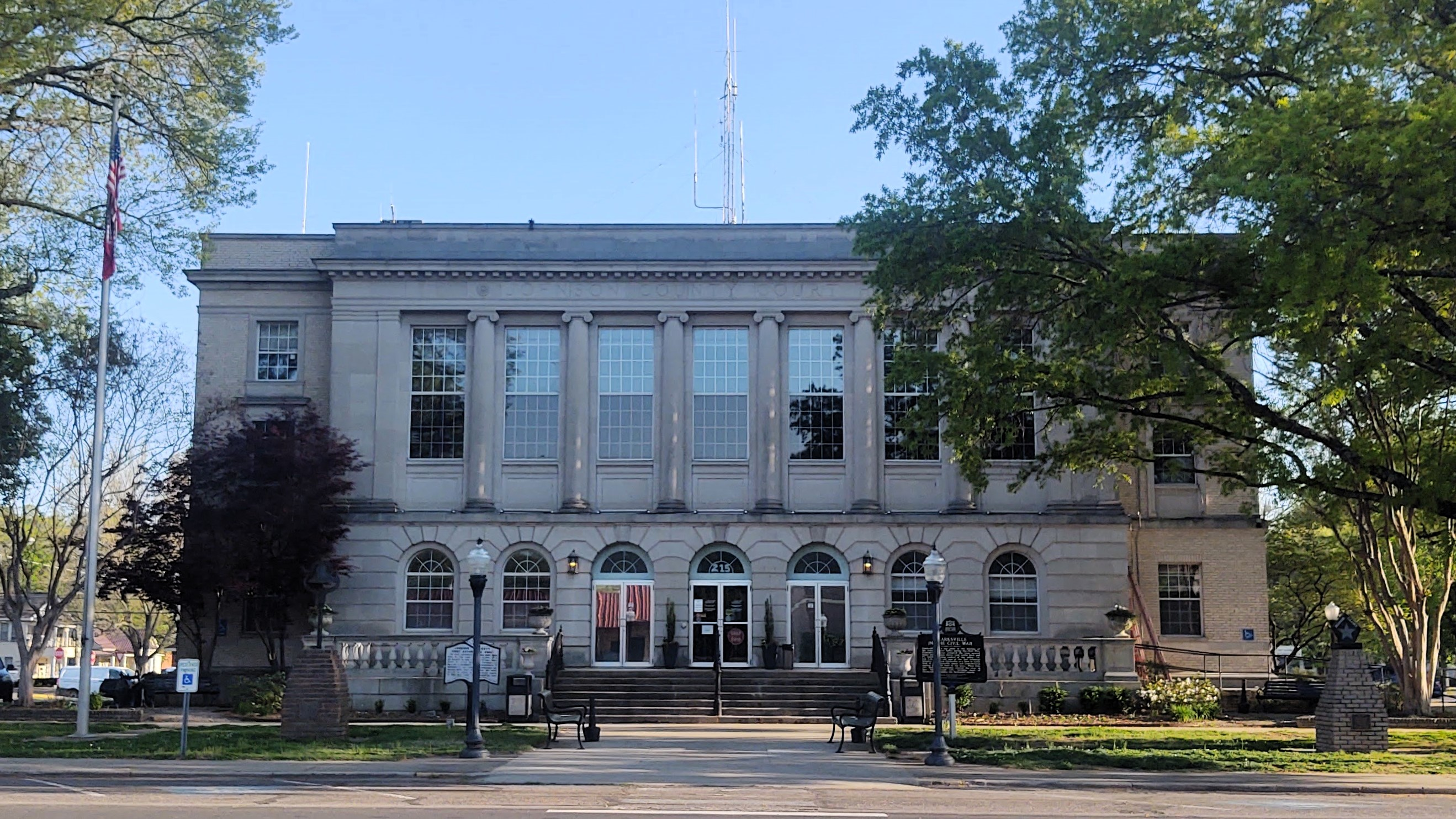

- Location within Arkansas Location within the United States
- Location: 215 W. Main Street; Clarksville, Arkansas
- Coordinates: 35°28′15″N 93°27′53″W
- Area: less than one acre
- Built by: Linebarger & Feaser
- Architect: Haralson & Nelson
- Architectural style: Colonial Revival, Classical Revival
- NRHP reference No.: 91000680
- Added to NRHP: June 14, 1991

The Johnson County Courthouse is located at 215 W. Main Street in downtown Clarksville, the county seat of Johnson County, Arkansas. It is a three-story masonry structure, built out of brick and rusticated concrete blocks. It has a Classical Revival facade, with a seven-bay projecting section. Windows and entrances on the ground floor are set in round-arch openings, while the upper-level windows are rectangular sash, set in bays articulated by pilasters. It was built in 1934 with funding support from the Federal Emergency Administration, and is the county's third courthouse.

The building was listed on the National Register of Historic Places in 1991.

== See also ==
- List of county courthouses in Arkansas
- National Register of Historic Places listings in Johnson County, Arkansas
