= Adair County Courthouse (Oklahoma) =

- U.S. National Register of Historic Places
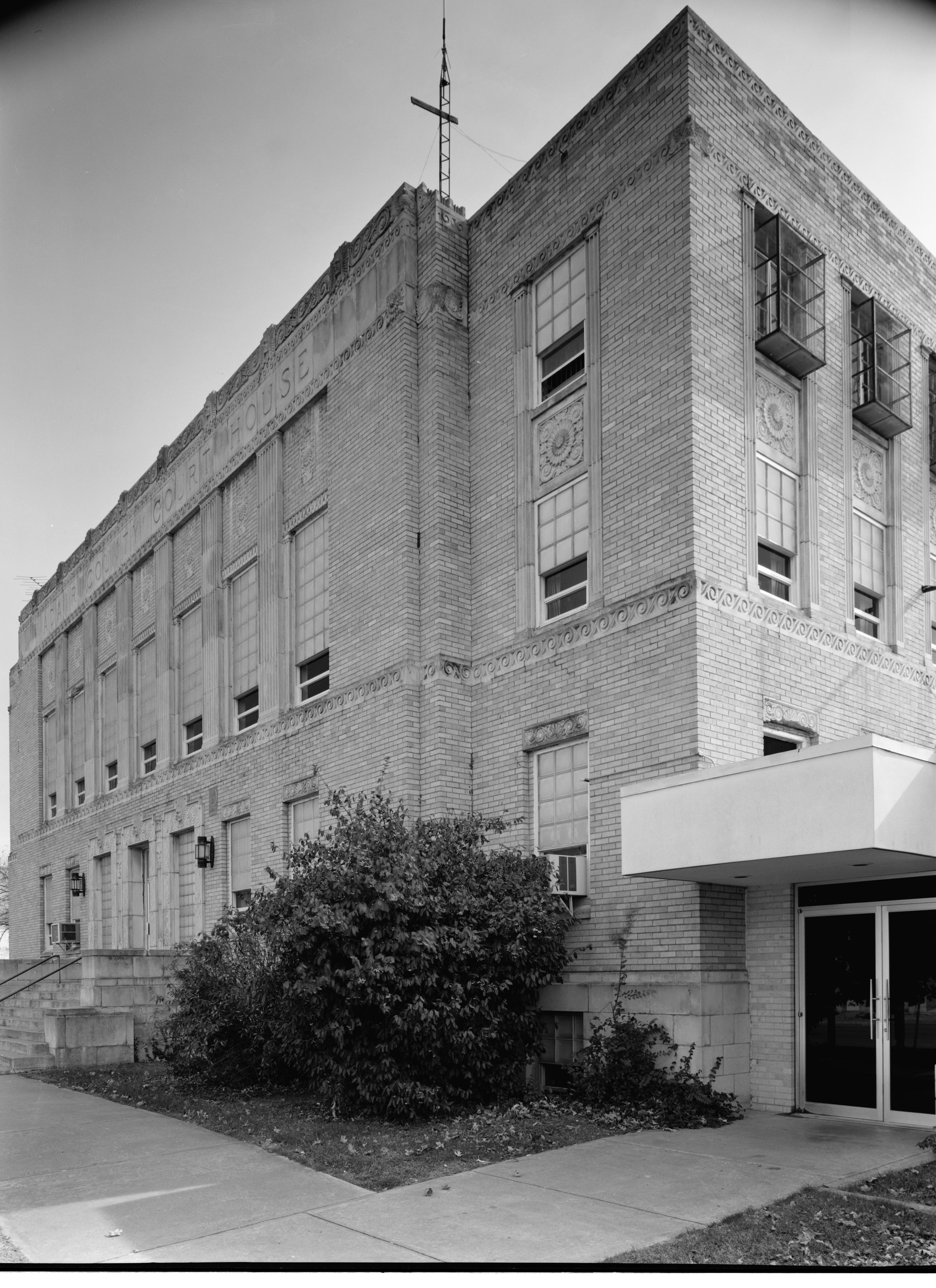
- Front of the courthouse

- Location within Oklahoma Location within the United States
- Location: Division St., Stilwell, Oklahoma
- Coordinates: 35°48′51″N 94°37′43″W
- Area: 1 acre (0.40 ha)
- Built: 1929
- Built by: J. H. Reddick
- Architect: Haralson & Nelson
- MPS: County Courthouses of Oklahoma TR
- NRHP reference No.: 84002927,
- Added to NRHP: August 23, 1984

The Adair County Courthouse is located in Stilwell, Oklahoma and is the central building for the county government for Adair County, Oklahoma. The current building is the fourth building in Stilwell to serve as the courthouse. From 1902 until 1908 a two-story wood-frame schoolhouse served as the courthouse. In 1908 a new brick building was built and was used until 1920 when a building of native stone was built. On December 30, 1929, the new stone building burned down. The current classically inspired, art deco building was built on the same site and was completed in 1930. The building was designed by Haralson & Nelson and was built out of limestone, steel, and concrete. The cornice has molded bas-relief figures of American Indians in full headdress. The building was listed on the National Register of Historic Places in 1984. In 1992 a marble war memorial which contained the names of all Adair County residents killed in World War I, World War II, the Korean War, and the Vietnam War was dedicated on the courthouse lawn.

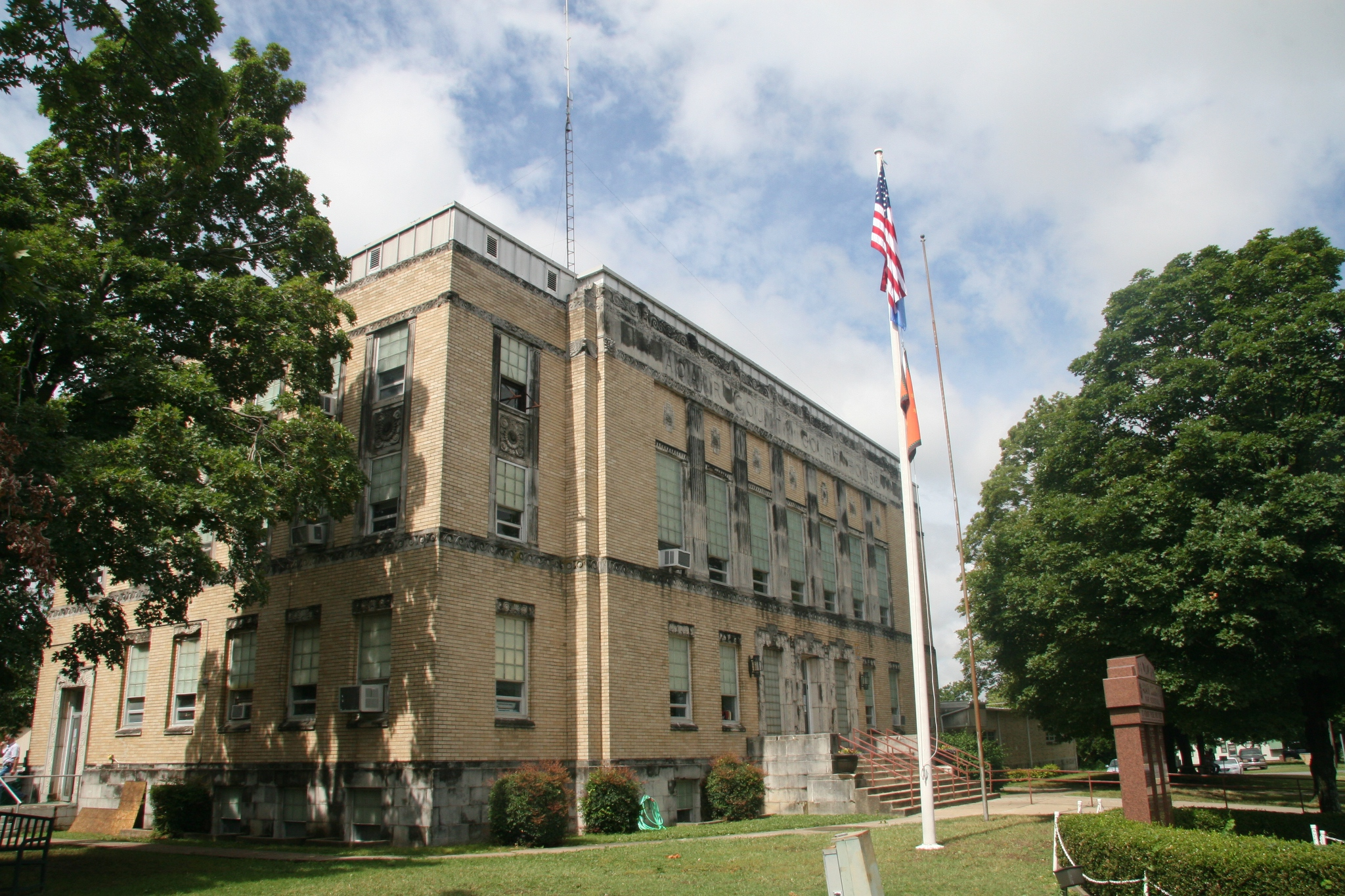
Adair County courthouse in 2012
