= Calhoun County Courthouse (Arkansas) =

- U.S. National Register of Historic Places
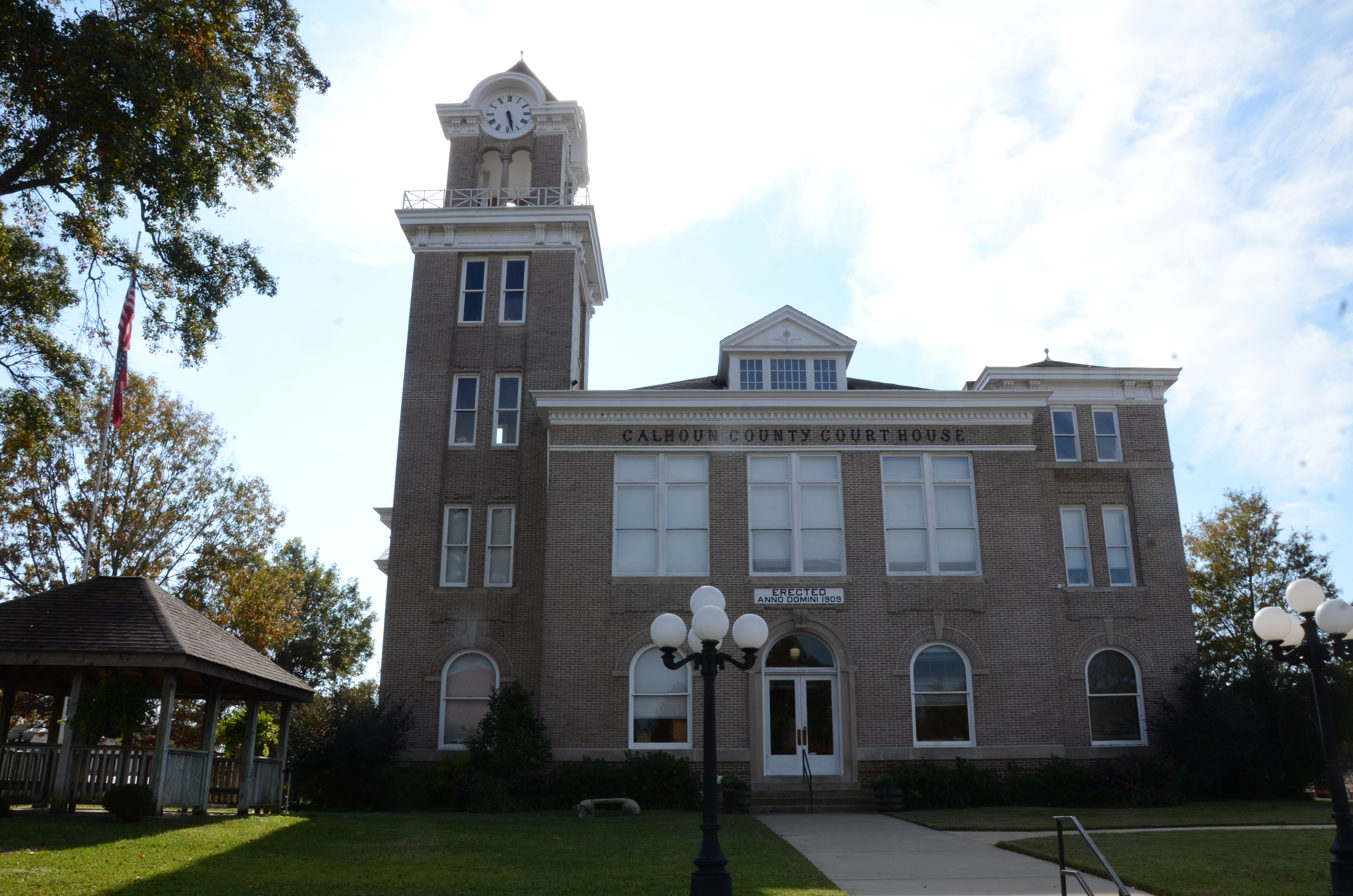

- Location within Arkansas Location within the United States
- Location: Courthouse Sq., Hampton, Arkansas
- Coordinates: 33°32′15″N 92°28′19″W
- Area: less than one acre
- Built: 1909
- Built by: E.L. Koonce
- Architect: Frank W. Gibb
- Architectural style: Georgian Revival
- NRHP reference No.: 76000390
- Added to NRHP: December 12, 1976

The Calhoun County Courthouse is a courthouse in Hampton, Arkansas, the county seat of Calhoun County, built in 1909. Located within downtown Hampton, the two-story brick building was designed by Frank W. Gibb, who designed 60 courthouses in Arkansas. The courthouse is both a historically and architecturally significant structure, and was listed on the National Register of Historic Places because of this significance in 1976.

== Architecture ==
Constructed by E. L. Koonce, the Calhoun County Courthouse is a two-story brick Georgian Revival structure with a five-story clock tower. The building is not particularly ornamented, with cut stone trim, including stone keystones above arched windows.

== See also ==
- List of county courthouses in Arkansas
- National Register of Historic Places listings in Calhoun County, Arkansas
