= Dodson Avenue Methodist Episcopal Church =

Historic church in Arkansas, United States

- U.S. National Register of Historic Places
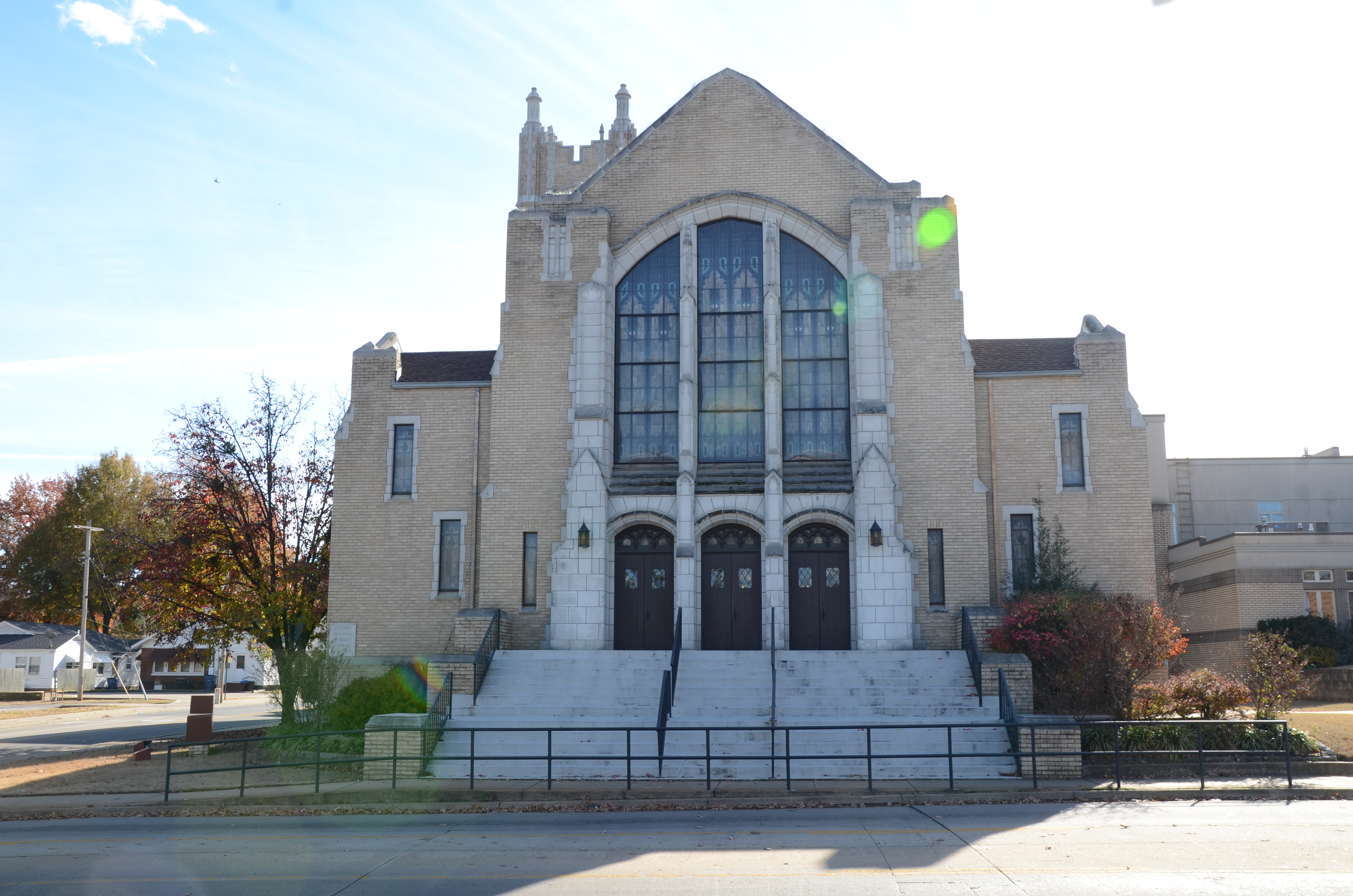
- Front of the church

- Location within Arkansas Location within the United States
- Location: 1922 Dodson Ave., Fort Smith, Arkansas
- Coordinates: 35°22′19″N 94°24′45″W
- Area: less than one acre
- Built: 1930
- Architect: Haralson & Nelson
- Architectural style: Late Gothic Revival
- NRHP reference No.: 06000082
- Added to NRHP: March 2, 2006

The Goddard United Methodist Church formerly the Dodson Avenue Methodist Episcopal Church, is a historic church at 1922 Dodson Avenue in Fort Smith, Arkansas. The church building is an imposing Late Gothic stone structure, built in 1930 to a design by the local architectural firm of Haralson & Nelson. The congregation for which it was built was founded in 1908, and worshipped in a wood-frame church at this site prior to the construction of the present edifice. In October 1945 the church was renamed the Goddard Memorial Methodist Church in honor of a recent pastor, Dr. O. E. Goddard. The church complex includes, in addition to the church, a children's building, fellowship hall, and office building.

The church was listed on the National Register of Historic Places in 2006.

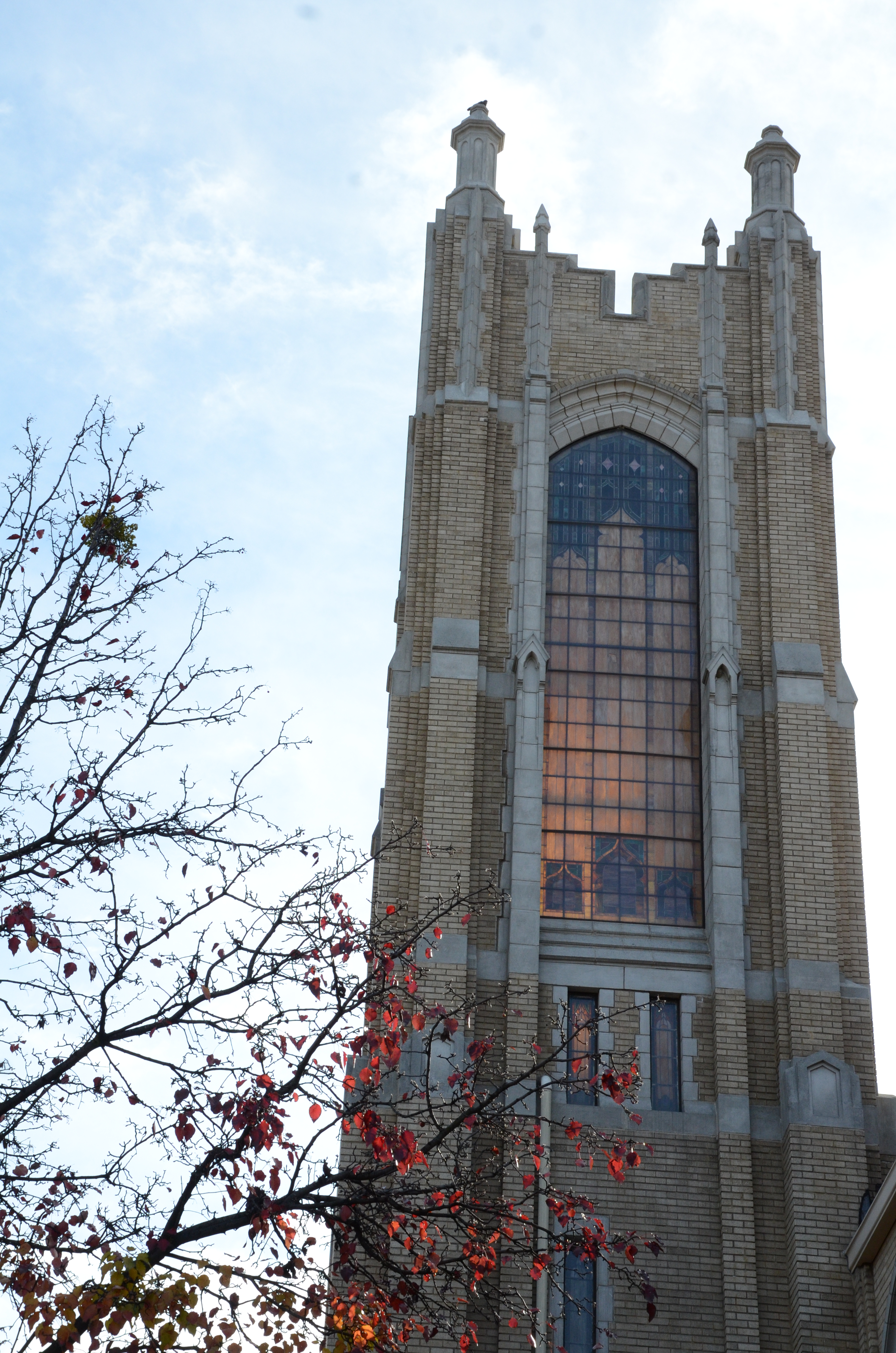
The church's bell tower

== See also ==
- National Register of Historic Places listings in Sebastian County, Arkansas
