= Our Lady of the Ozarks Shrine =

Historic church in Arkansas, United States

- U.S. National Register of Historic Places
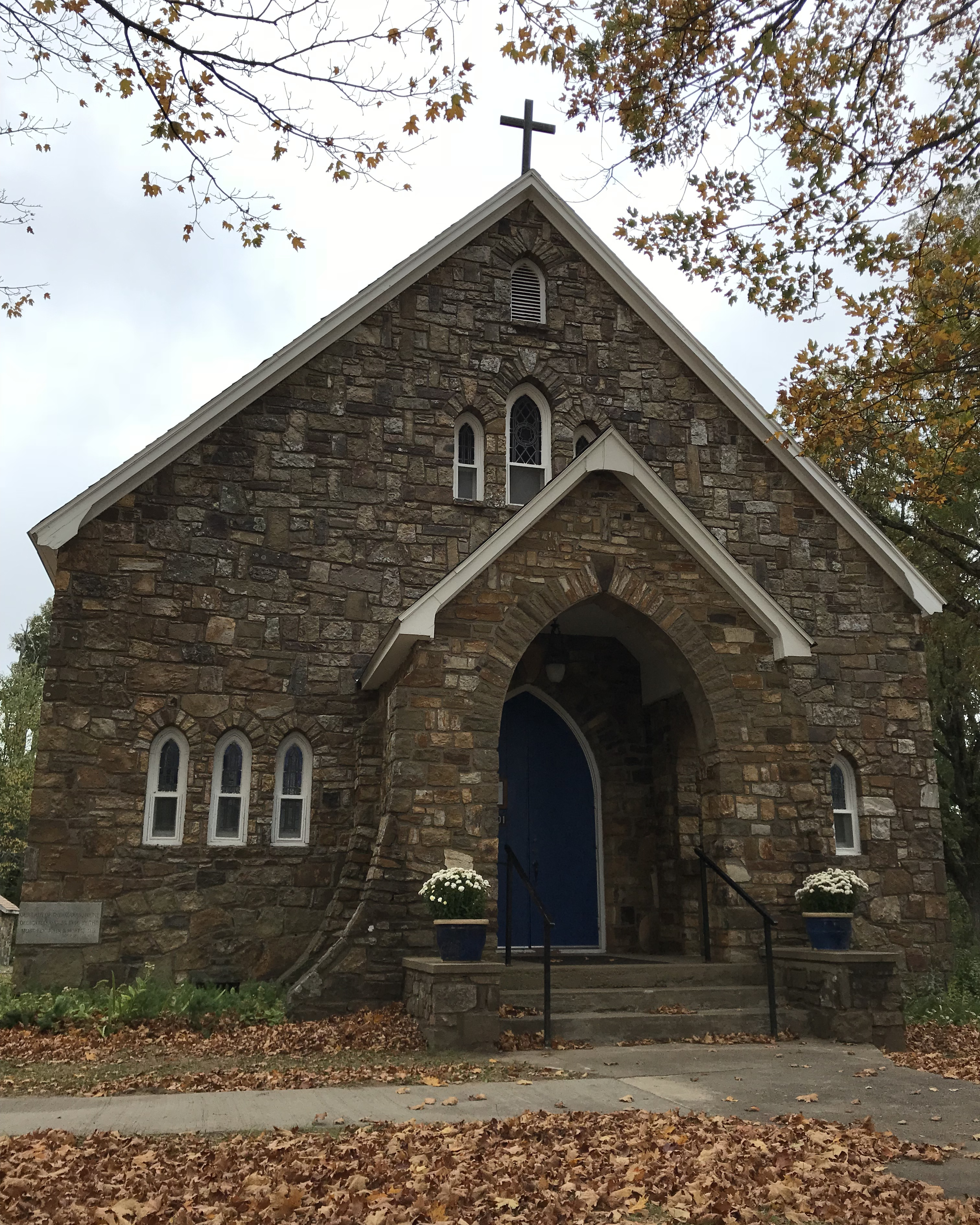

- Location within Arkansas Location within the United States
- Location: 22741 US 71, Mountainburg, Arkansas
- Coordinates: 35°45′41″N 94°6′57″W
- Area: 2.5 acres (1.0 ha)
- Built: 1944
- Architect: E. Chester Nelson
- Architectural style: Gothic Revival
- NRHP reference No.: 100003993
- Added to NRHP: May 29, 2019

The Our Lady of the Ozarks Shrine is a Roman Catholic religious shrine in rural northern Crawford County, Arkansas. It is located on the west side of United States Route 71, south of Winslow. The shrine includes a small church, rectory, parish hall, and several cast stone statues including one of Saint Therese. The shrine was erected in the 1940s through the efforts of Clara Muxen, a Roman Catholic nun who sought to expand the church's ability to serve Catholics in the area.

The building was listed on the National Register of Historic Places in 2019, where it is incorrectly listed in Washington County.
