= Charleston Commercial Historic District =

Historic district in Arkansas, United States

- U.S. National Register of Historic Places
- U.S. Historic district
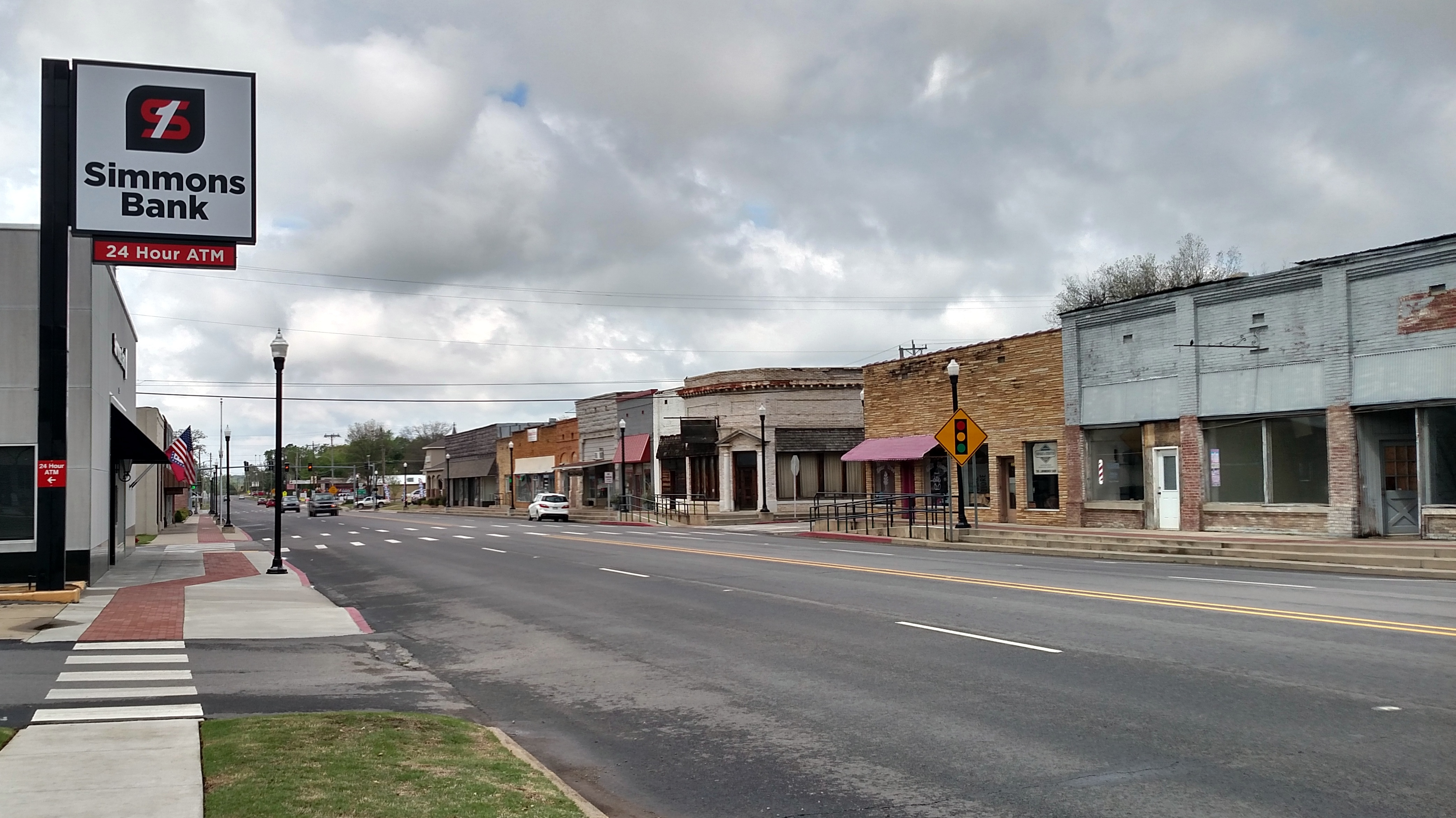

- Location within Arkansas Location within the United States
- Location: Main Street (Highway 22) roughly from Highway 217 to Tilden Street, Charleston, Arkansas
- Coordinates: 35°17′56″N 94°2′11″W
- Area: 2.5 acres (1.0 ha)
- Built: 1900
- Architectural style: Early Commercial, Late 19th And 20th Century Revivals
- NRHP reference No.: 08000462
- Added to NRHP: May 29, 2008

The Charleston Commercial Historic District encompasses the historic commercial center of Charleston, Arkansas. Extending along East Main Street (Arkansas Highway 22) between Tilden Street and Arkansas Highway 217, the district includes primarily single-story masonry commercial buildings built between 1900 and 1940. Notable exceptions are the Franklin County Courthouse, Southern District, and the Methodist Episcopal Church.

The district was listed on the National Register of Historic Places in 2008.

== See also ==
- National Register of Historic Places listings in Franklin County, Arkansas
