= E. Chester Nelson =

American architect (1894–1970)

- Born: July 26, 1894; Minneapolis
- Died: April 9, 1970 (aged 75); Fort Smith, Arkansas
- Occupation: Architect
- Practice: Haralson & Nelson; E. Chester Nelson; E. Chester Nelson & Associates; Nelson, Laser & Cheyne

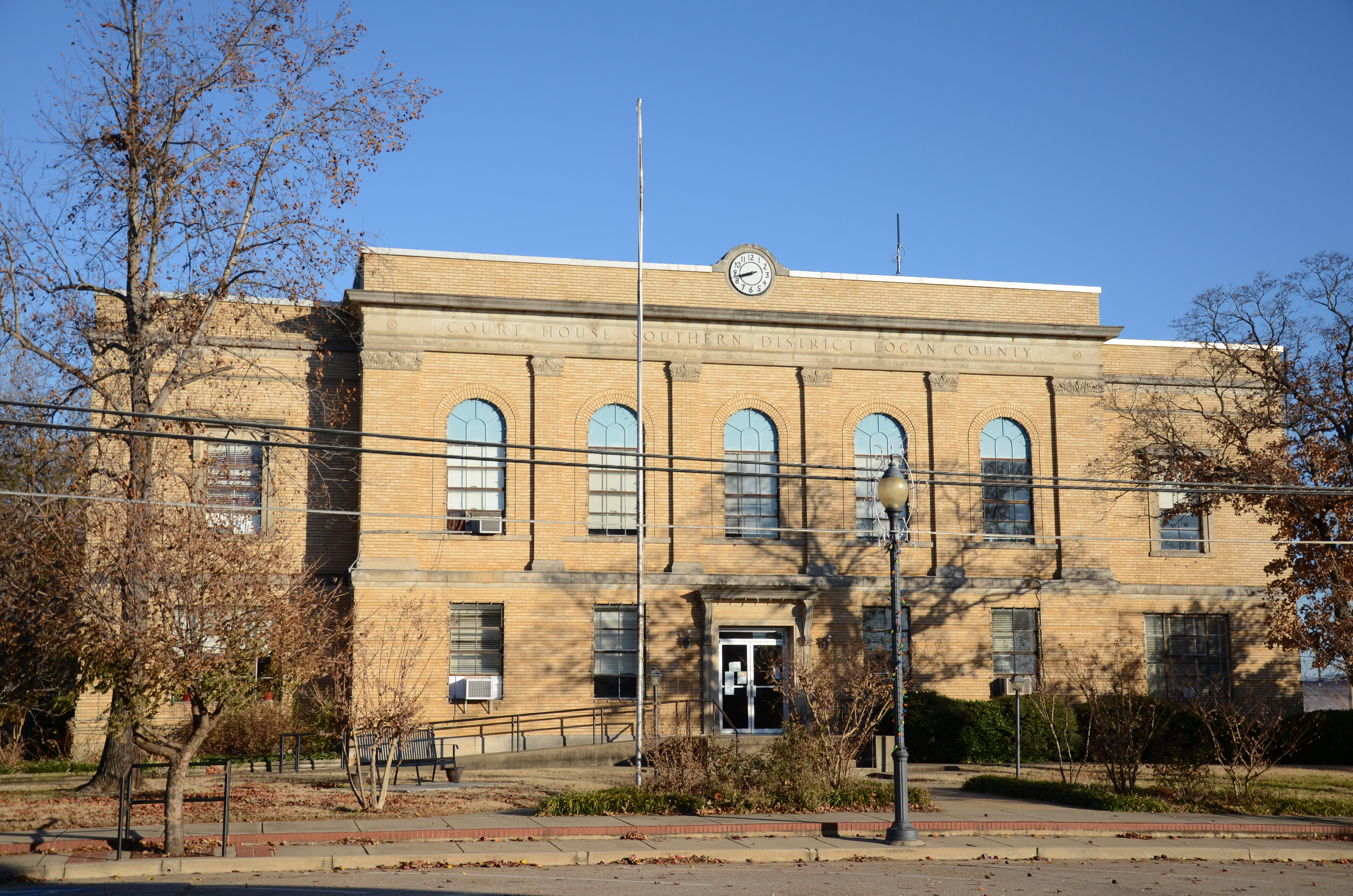
The Logan County Courthouse, Southern Judicial District in Booneville, designed by Haralson & Nelson in the Italian Renaissance Revival style and completed in 1928.

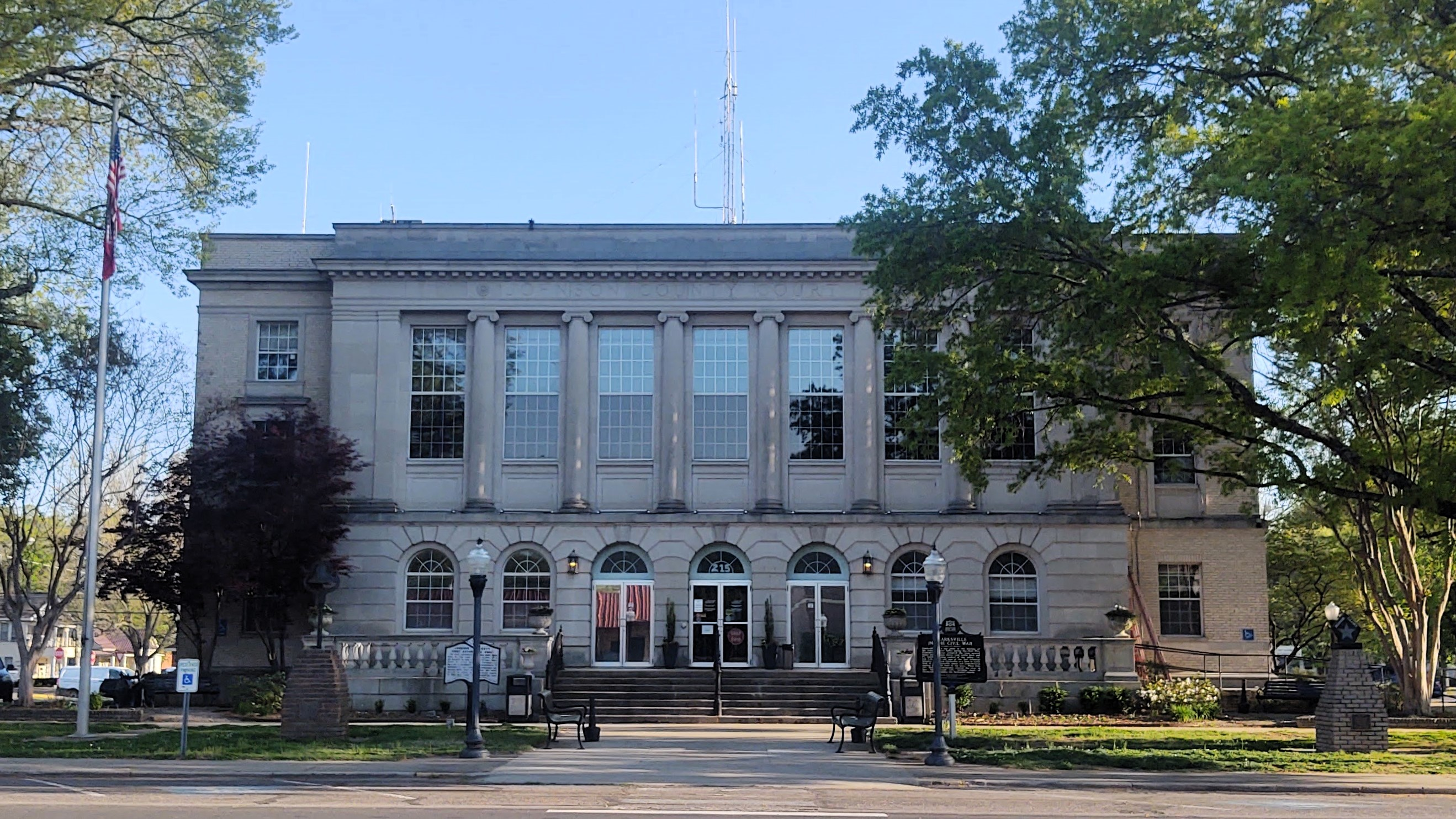
The Johnson County Courthouse in Clarksville, designed by Haralson & Nelson in the Beaux-Arts style and completed in 1934.

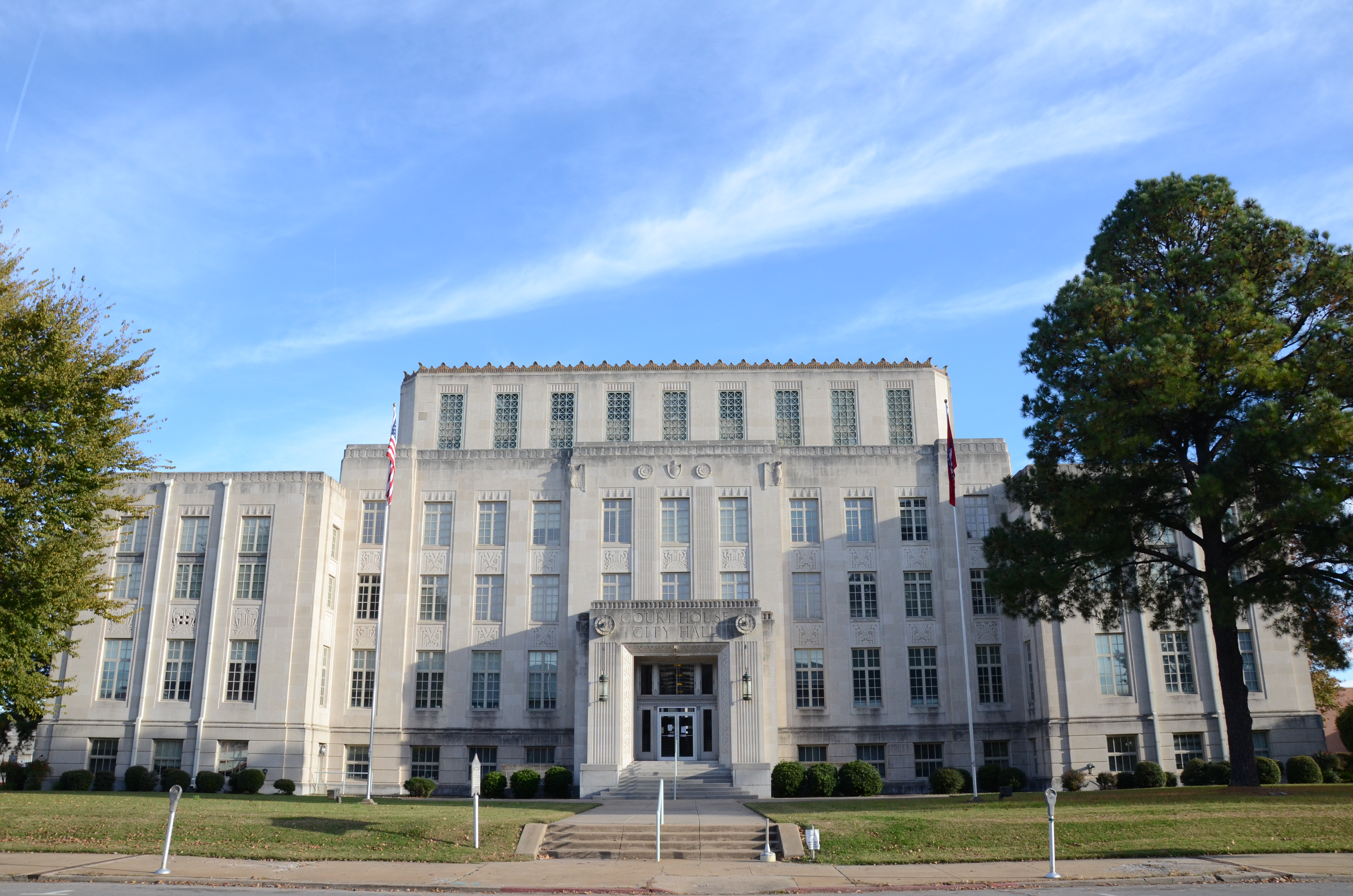
The Sebastian County Courthouse-Fort Smith City Hall in Fort Smith, designed by associated architects E. Chester Nelson and Bassham & Wheeler in the Art Deco style and completed in 1937.

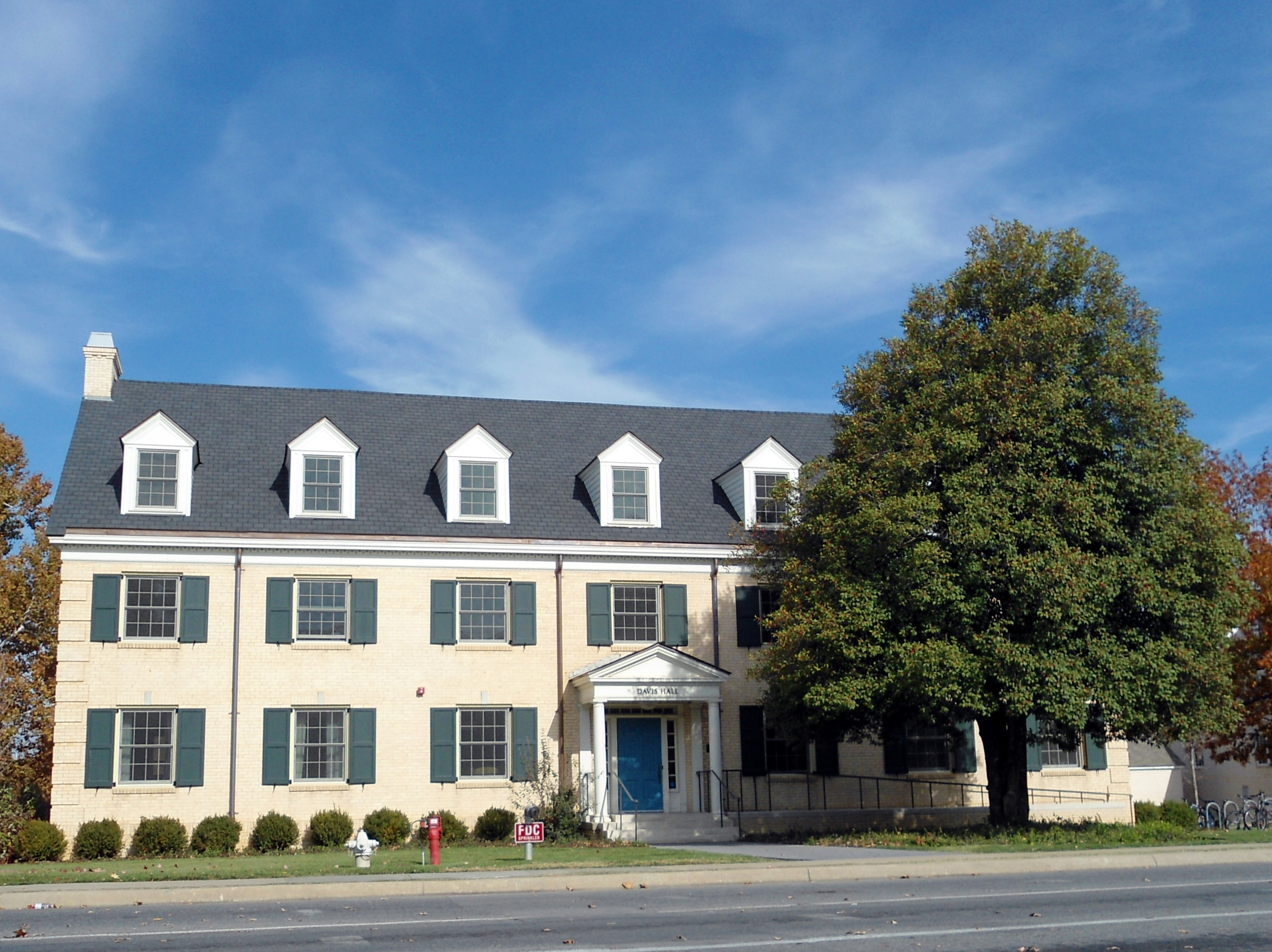
Davis Hall of the University of Arkansas, designed by Nelson in the Colonial Revival style and completed in 1942.

The First Federal Building in Fort Smith, designed by Robert S. Laser of E. Chester Nelson & Associates in the International style and completed in 1961.

E. Chester Nelson AIA (July 26, 1894 – April 9, 1970) was an American architect in practice in Fort Smith, Arkansas from 1919 until his death in 1970. The firm he established in 1935 is still in business as of 2024 as Studio 6 Architects.

== Life and career ==
Elmer Chester Nelson was born July 26, 1894, in Minneapolis to Carl Oskar Nelson and Bessie Nelson, née Peterson. His parents were Swedish immigrants. His family moved to Birmingham, Alabama, when he was still a child. He was educated at the Alabama Polytechnic Institute, now Auburn University, where he studied from 1913 to 1915. He then worked for architects Miller & Martin in Birmingham and Frederick Ausfeld in Montgomery until the outbreak of World War I, during which he served at an army depot at Newport News, Virginia. In 1919 he returned to Ausfeld, but within a few months was invited by a classmate, Joe J. Haralson, to come to Fort Smith. Haralson was working for Fort Smith architect Alonzo Klingensmith, who was looking to sell his firm. Klingensmith had been previously responsible for the Logan County Courthouse, Eastern District (1908) in Paris and the First Methodist Episcopal Church, South (1909) in Ozark. Together, they bought the firm and in November 1919 formed the partnership of Haralson & Nelson. Major works of the partnership include the Logan County Courthouse, Southern Judicial District (1928) in Booneville, the Dodson Avenue Methodist Episcopal Church (1930) in Fort Smith and the Johnson County Courthouse (1934) in Clarksville.

In 1935 the partnership was dissolved. Haralson continued the firm as Haralson & Mott in partnership with Ralph O. Mott, an employee since 1931, and Nelson established an independent practice. Nelson's independent works include the Sebastian County Courthouse-Fort Smith City Hall (1937, with Bassham & Wheeler) in Fort Smith and the Madison County Courthouse (1939, with T. Ewing Shelton) in Huntsville and Our Lady of the Ozarks Shrine (1946) near Winslow. The firm was reorganized in 1957 as E. Chester Nelson & Associates to include Robert S. Laser, his nephew, and James G. Cheyne Jr. as associates. In 1962 they became partners in the reorganized Nelson, Laser & Cheyne. Nelson was senior partner of the firm until his death in 1970.

== Personal life ==
Nelson was married in 1930 to Minnie Laser. They had two children. He was a member of the American Institute of Architects (AIA), local fraternal organizations and the First Presbyterian Church. He died April 9, 1970, in Fort Smith at the age of 75.

== Legacy ==
The firm Nelson had established in 1935 outlived him. It was renamed first to Laser, Knight, Hathaway & Guest, second to Laser, Knight, Hendrix & Guest, third to Laser, Guest, Hendrix & Reddick and fourth to Guest Reddick Architects. Most recently, in 2016 it was renamed Studio 6 Architects.

At least twelve buildings designed by Nelson, independently and with others, have been listed on the United States National Register of Historic Places.

== Architectural works ==
Dates are date of completion where known; other dates are approximate.

=== Haralson & Nelson, 1919–1935 ===
- 1928 – Heavener City Hall (former), (Note: NRHP-listed.) 401 E 1st St, Heavener, Oklahoma
- 1928 – Logan County Courthouse, Southern Judicial District, Booneville, Arkansas
- 1929 – Fort Smith Masonic Temple, (Note: Designed by Mann, Wanger & King, architects, with Haralson & Nelson, associate architects. NRHP-listed.) 200 N 11th St, Fort Smith, Arkansas
- 1930 – Dodson Avenue Methodist Episcopal Church, Fort Smith, Arkansas
- 1931 – Fentress Mortuary, 1805 N A St, Fort Smith, Arkansas
- 1932 – Adair County Courthouse, 220 W Division St, Stilwell, Oklahoma
- 1934 – Johnson County Courthouse, Clarksville, Arkansas
- 1935 – Vol Walker Hall, (Note: Designed by Haralson & Nelson, architects, with Jamieson & Spearl, consulting architects. Gordon & Kaelber were later retained by the university to design the exterior. NRHP-listed, also a contributing resource to the University of Arkansas Campus Historic District, NRHP-listed in 2009.) University of Arkansas, Fayetteville, Arkansas
- 1937 – Men's Gymnasium (former), (Note: NRHP-listed, also a contributing resource to the University of Arkansas Campus Historic District, NRHP-listed in 2009.) University of Arkansas, Fayetteville, Arkansas

=== E. Chester Nelson, 1935–1957 ===
- 1937 – Sebastian County Courthouse-Fort Smith City Hall, (Note: Designed by E. Chester Nelson and Bassham & Wheeler, associated architects. NRHP-listed.) Fort Smith, Arkansas
- 1939 – Madison County Courthouse, (Note: Designed by T. Ewing Shelton and E. Chester Nelson, associated architects. NRHP-listed.) Huntsville, Arkansas
- 1942 – Davis Hall, (Note: A contributing resource to the University of Arkansas Campus Historic District, NRHP-listed in 2009.) University of Arkansas, Fayetteville, Arkansas
- 1946 – Our Lady of the Ozarks Shrine, Winslow, Arkansas
- 1952 – Sparks Regional Medical Center, 100 Towson Ave, Fort Smith, Arkansas

=== E. Chester Nelson & Associates, 1957–1962 ===
- 1961 – First Federal Building, 524 Garrison Ave, Fort Smith, Arkansas

=== Nelson, Laser & Cheyne, from 1962 ===
- 1964 – Silas H. Hunt Hall, University of Arkansas, Fayetteville, Arkansas
- 1965 – Siloam Springs City Hall (former), 410 N Broadway St, Siloam Springs, Arkansas
- 1966 – Fort Smith Convention Center, 55 S 7th St, Fort Smith, Arkansas
- 1969 – Sebastian County Courthouse, 301 E Center St, Greenwood, Arkansas
- 1971 – Kimpel Hall, University of Arkansas, Fayetteville, Arkansas
- 1975 – Mercy Hospital Fort Smith, (Note: Designed by Hellmuth, Obata & Kassabaum, architects, with Nelson, Laser & Cheyne, associate architects.) 7301 Rogers Ave, Fort Smith, Arkansas
