= Phillips County Courthouse (Arkansas) =

- U.S. National Register of Historic Places
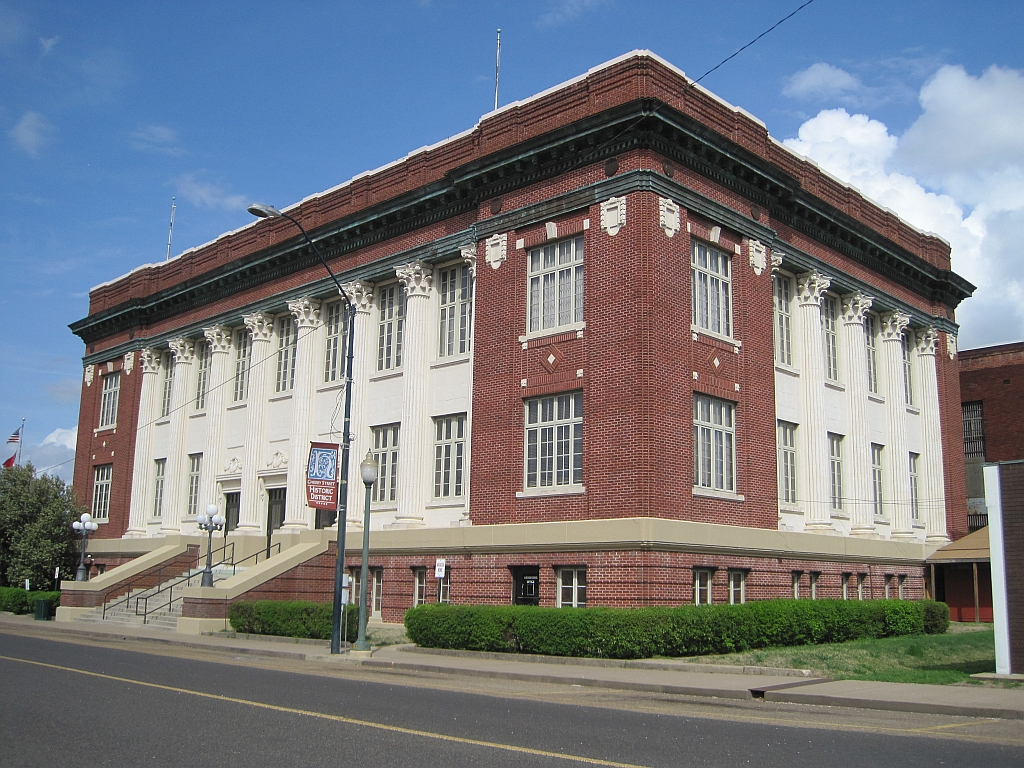

- Location within Arkansas Location within the United States
- Interactive map showing the location of Phillips County Courthouse
- Location: 622 Cherry St., Helena, Arkansas
- Coordinates: 34°31′42″N 90°35′6″W
- Built: 1914
- Built by: L. R. Wright and Company
- Architect: Frank W. Gibb
- Architectural style: Classical Revival
- NRHP reference No.: 77000265
- Added to NRHP: July 15, 1977

The Phillips County Courthouse is located at 622 Cherry Street in Helena-West Helena, the county seat of Phillips County, Arkansas. This 2.5 story municipal building has served as the county courthouse since 1915.

== History ==
=== Previous Court Houses ===
The original Phillips County Courthouse was a two-story log structure in Helena. This was replaced with a two-story frame building in 1847, which was located on the southeast corner of Ohio and Porter Streets. This building was burned in a fire that took out most of the commercial district in 1861. The third courthouse was constructed in 1869, located on the northwest corner of Franklin and Market Streets. This two-story building sat on a hill overlooking the town and had a tower with space for a clock and bell, but one was never installed. This building was demolished in 1914 when the present courthouse was opened.

=== Construction ===
In October, 1911, the Quorum Court of Phillips County appropriated $10,000 for the purpose of building a new courthouse and jail for the County. In July 1913, Frank W. Gibb of Little Rock, Arkansas completed his design of the building. L. R. Wright and Company of Dallas, Texas (their low bid being $249,000.00), built the courthouse, and construction was completed on June 14, 1915. The two entrances on the northern and eastern façades feature striking Corinthian columns that are painted white. They are built into matching white walls that stand as a stark contrast to the largely maroon-colored brick building. Other Classical features include a decorative frieze and elevated entrances.

=== Elaine Massacre of 1919 ===
The most prominent legal cases heard in the building were the series of trials following the Elaine Massacre, the bloodiest race riot in Arkansas history. In October 1919, the Phillips County Sheriff moved 285 inmates, all African American, into the county jail that stood at that time at the eastern façade of the courthouse. (The jail has since been moved offsite.) Phillips County deputies tortured many of the inmates inside the jail section and on the roof, and prosecutors ultimately charged 122 people, all African American, with various crimes. Phillips County Judge J. M. Jackson presided over the trial and appointed white attorneys for the defendants. The famous Elaine Twelve received death sentences at the Phillips County Courthouse but ultimately were released due to controversial errors in the trial.

== Building Description ==
It is a rectangular brick structure, designed by architect Frank W. Gibb and built in 1914. It is Classical Revival in style, with two full stories above a raised basement, and a flat roof. Its most prominent feature is a series of engaged fluted Corinthian columns, two stories in height, which line three sides of the building. Its interior has ornate woodwork and plasterwork that is in excellent condition.

The building was listed on the National Register of Historic Places in 1977.

== Spirit of the American Doughboy Statue ==
The Spirit of the American Doughboy Monument in Helena-West Helena is a memorial sculpture erected at the intersection of Cherry and Porter Street, directly northwest of the Phillips County Courthouse, following World War I to honor Arkansas servicemen who fought and died in the war. The statue was created by artist E. M. Viquesney and was dedicated on July 10, 1927.

== See also ==
- National Register of Historic Places listings in Phillips County, Arkansas
