= Sebastian County Courthouse-Fort Smith City Hall =

- Sebastian County Courthouse-Ft. Smith City Hall
- U.S. National Register of Historic Places
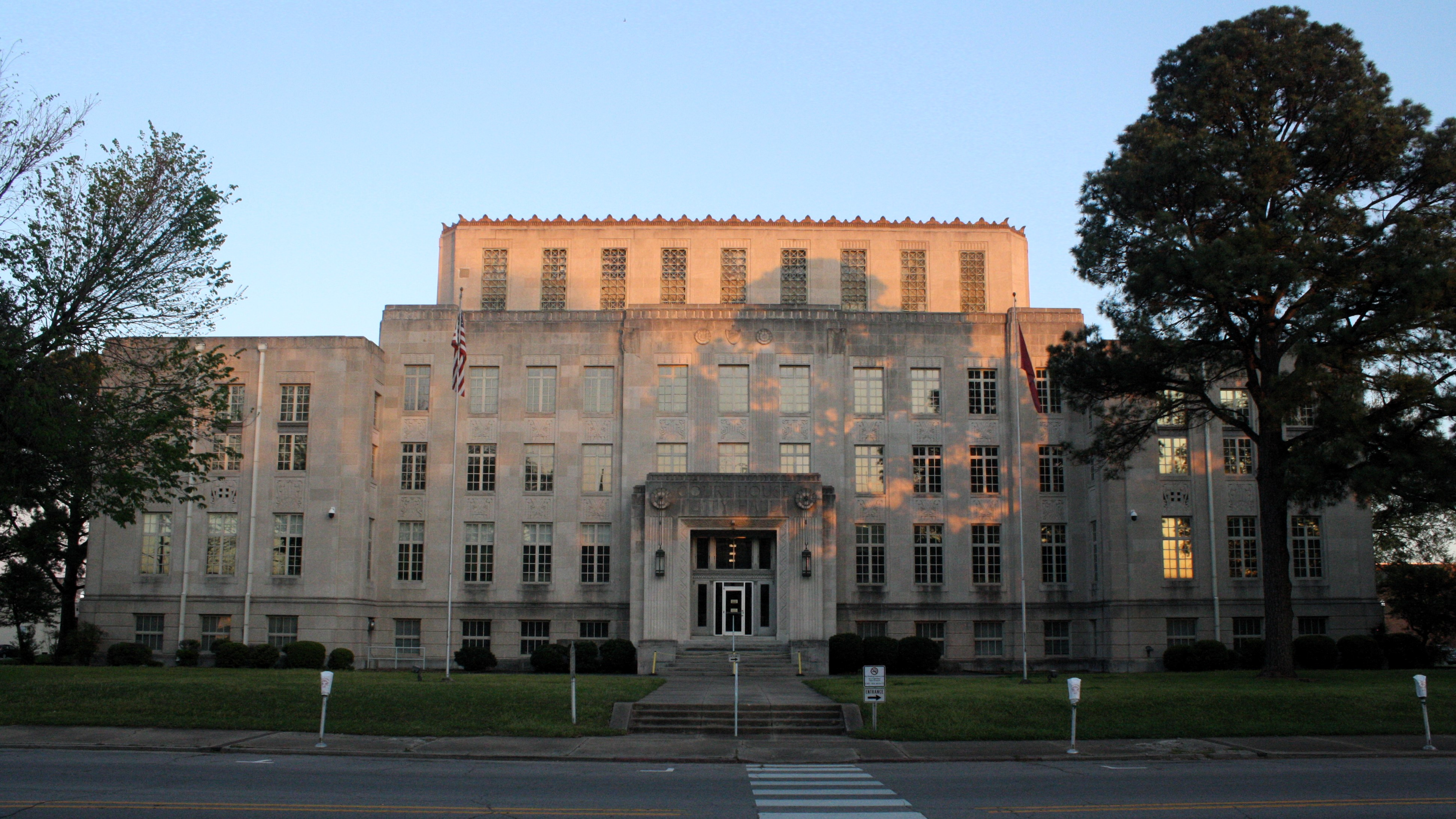

- Location within Arkansas Location within the United States
- Location: 100 S. 6th St., Fort Smith, Arkansas
- Coordinates: 35°23′8″N 94°25′34″W
- Area: 1.5 acres (0.61 ha)
- Built: 1937
- Built by: Manhattan Construction Co.
- Architect: E. Chester Nelson and Bassham & Wheeler
- Architectural style: Art Deco, WPA Moderne
- NRHP reference No.: 93000484
- Added to NRHP: June 8, 1993

The Sebastian County Courthouse/Fort Smith City Hall is a historic civic building at 100 South 6th Street in Fort Smith, Arkansas. It is a large four-story stone and concrete structure with modest Art Deco styling, designed by Fort Smith architects E. Chester Nelson and Bassham & Wheeler and built in 1937 with funding from the Public Works Administration. Its interior lobby and courthouse spaces are richly decorated, with marble walls, terrazzo marble flooring, and ornamental moldings around doorways. The building continues to house county facilities; the city offices are now located on Garrison Avenue.

The building was listed on the National Register of Historic Places in 1993.

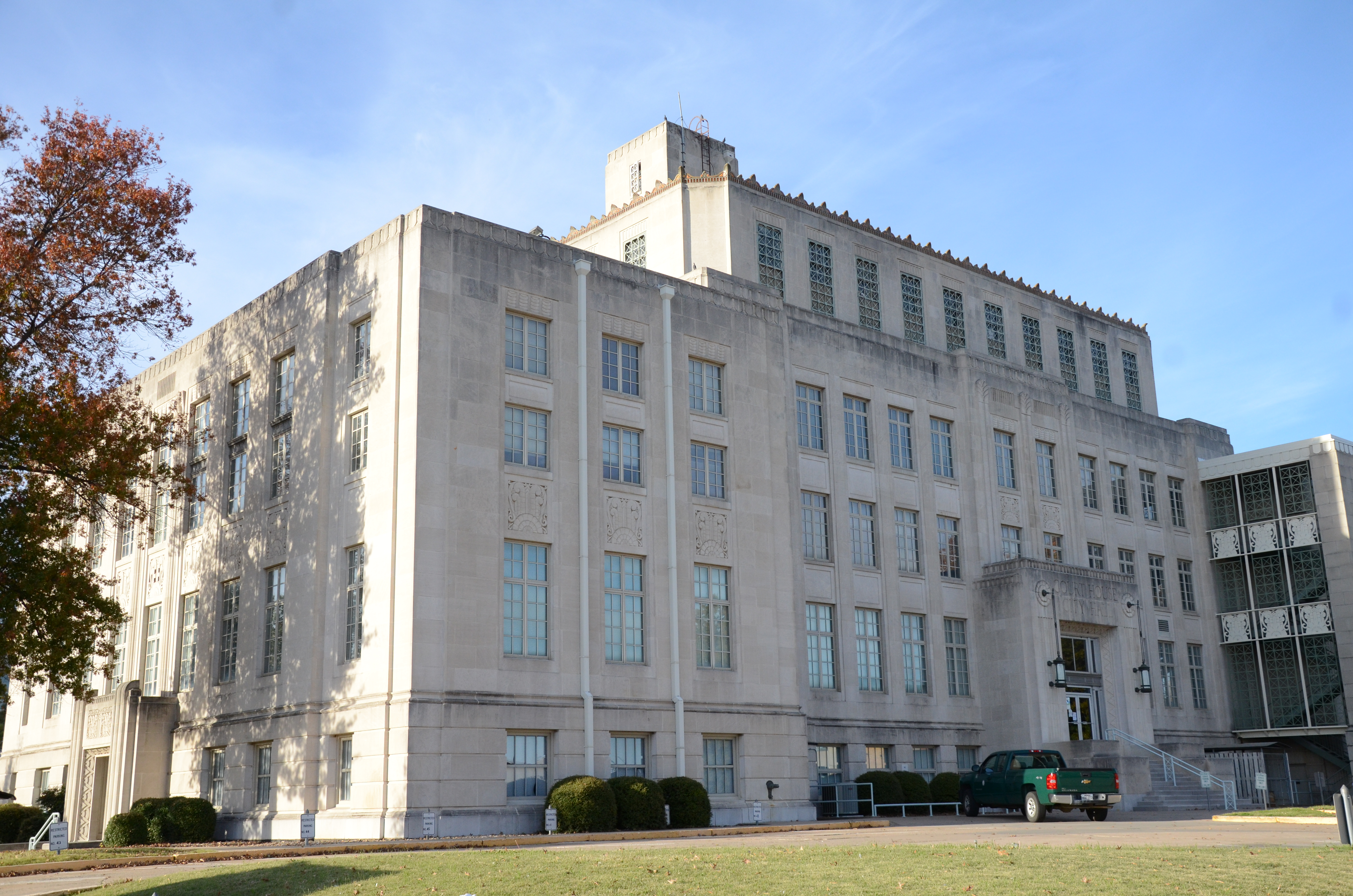
General view

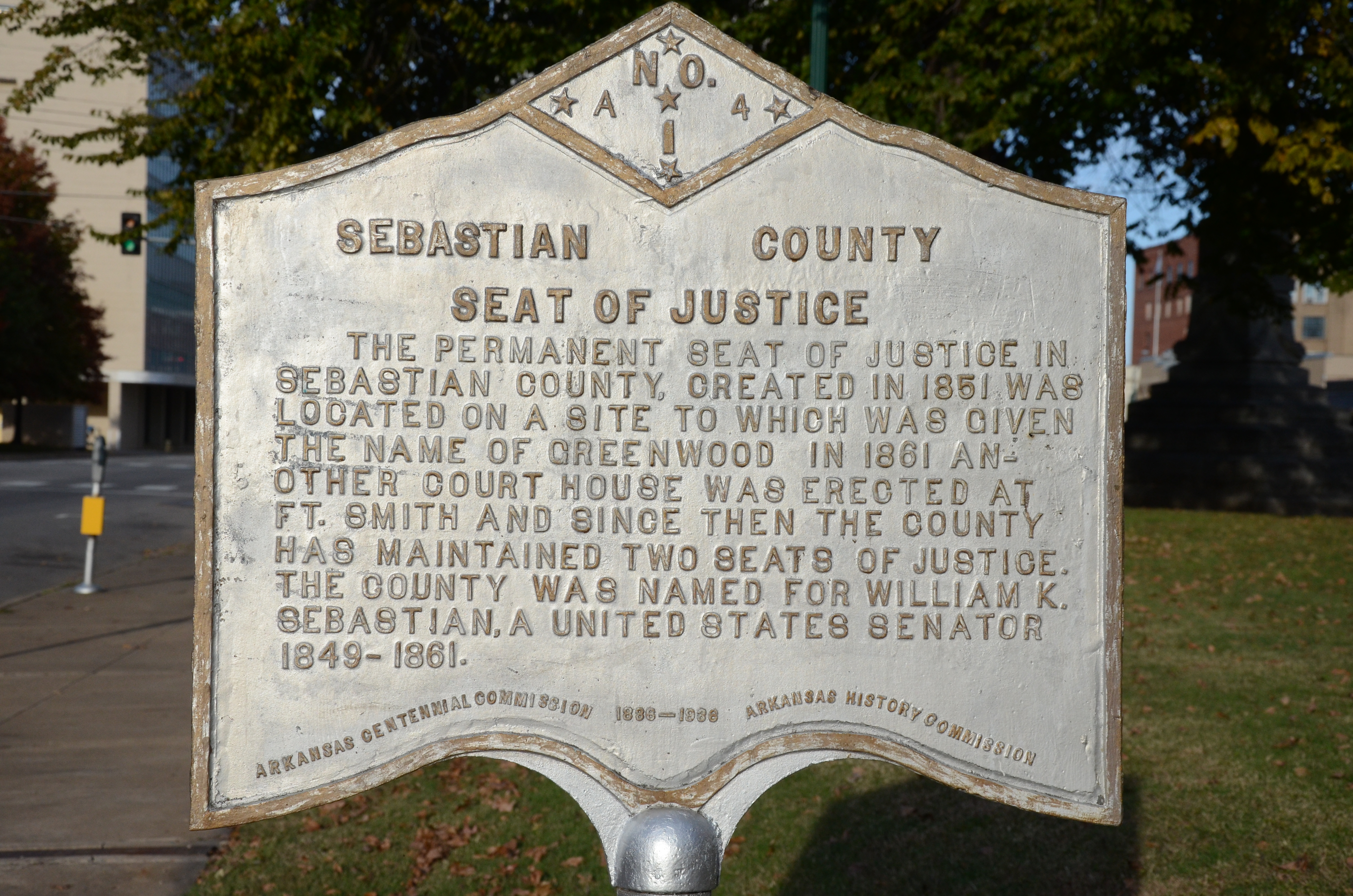
Commemorative plaque

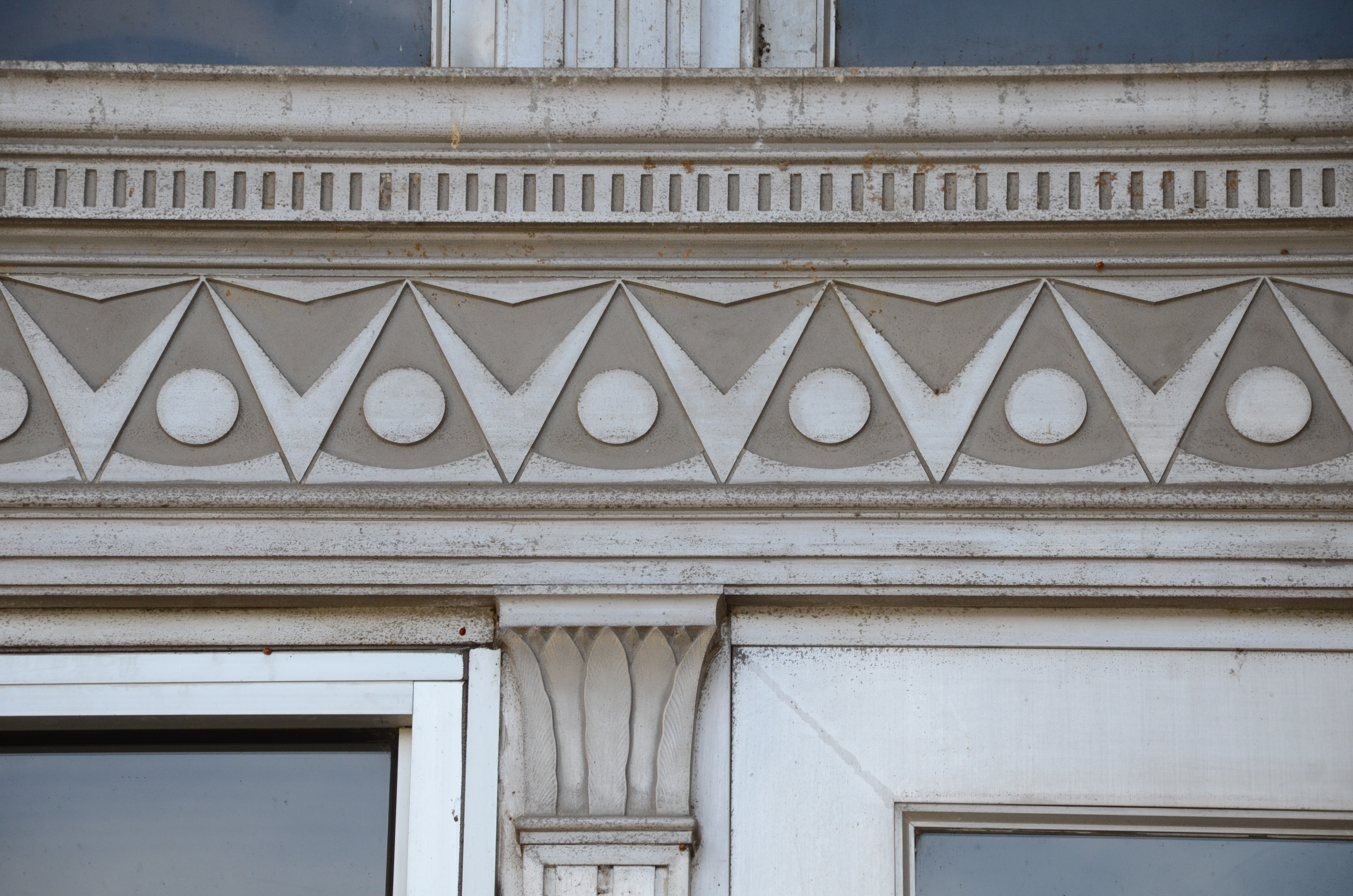
Aluminum Art Deco

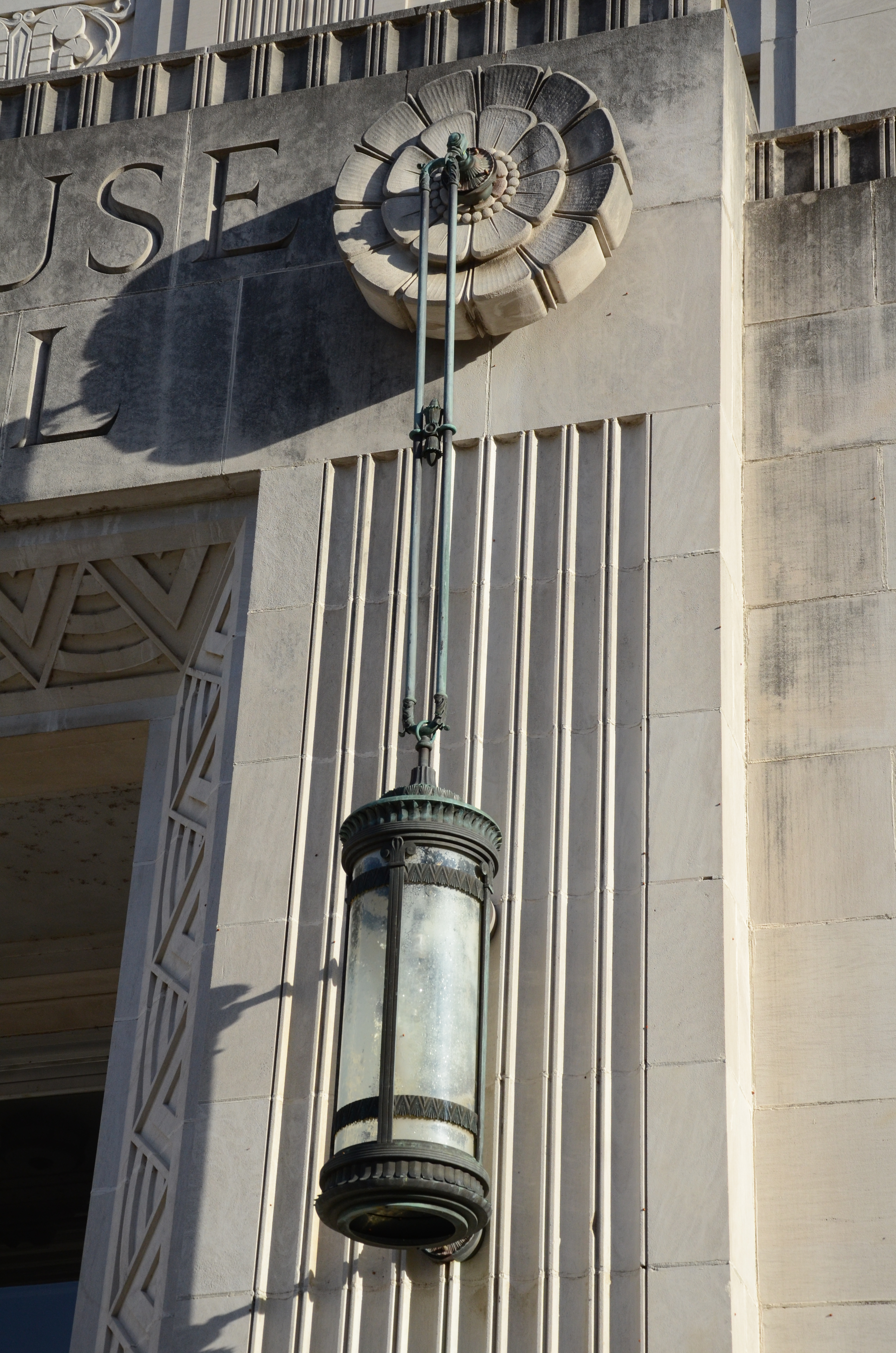
Main Entrance Light

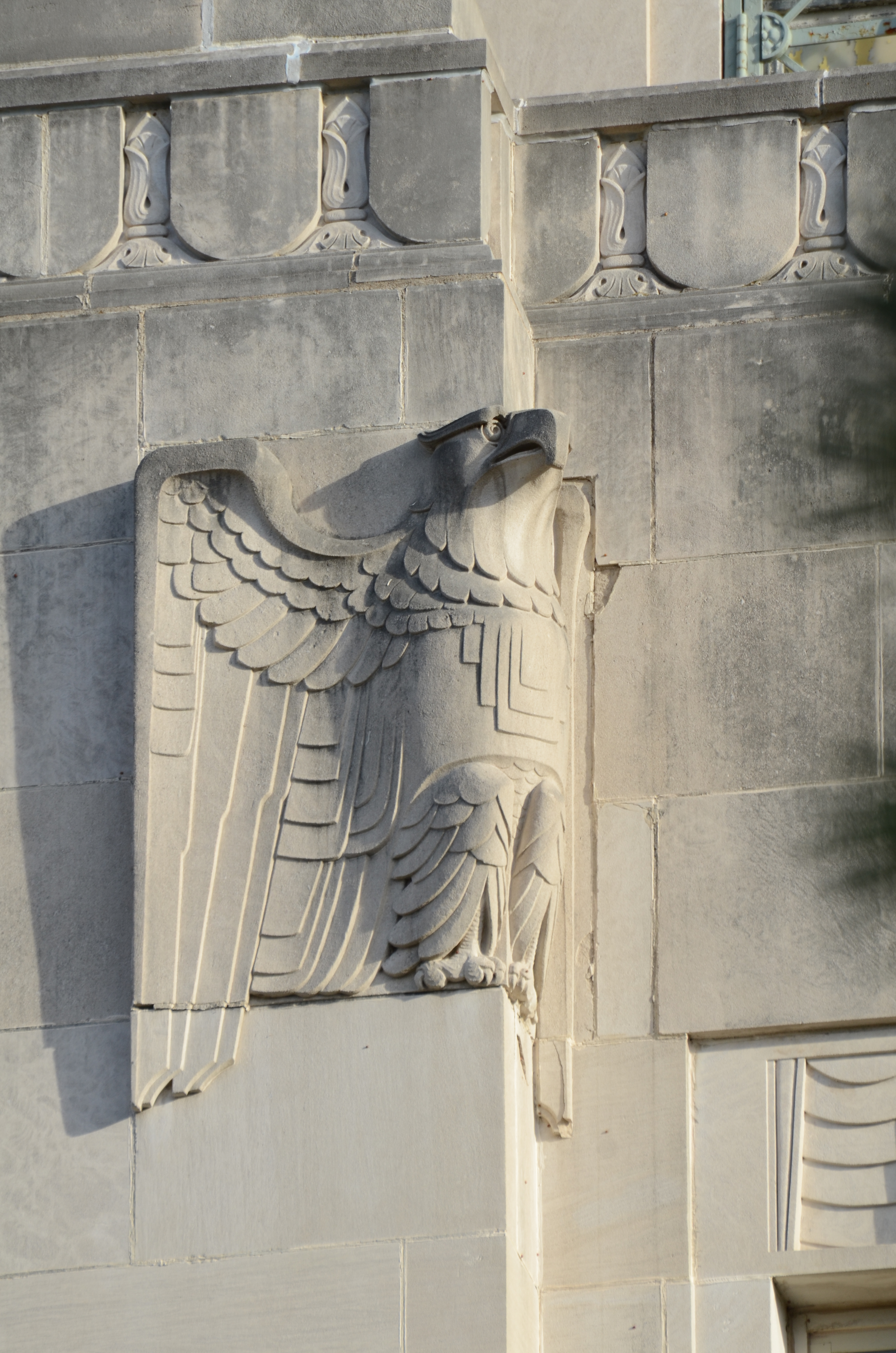
Sculpted eagle

== See also ==
- National Register of Historic Places listings in Sebastian County, Arkansas
