= Frank Gibb (cricketer) =

English cricketer

Personal information
- Full name: Frank Gibb
- Born: 18 January 1868; Wadhurst, Sussex, England
- Died: 23 March 1957 (aged 89); Hawkenbury, Kent, England
- Batting: Unknown
- Bowling: Left-arm fast

Domestic team information
- Years: Team
- 1890: Sussex

Career statistics
Competition	First-class
Matches	10
Runs scored	41
Batting average	3.41
100s/50s	–/–
Top score	8
Balls bowled	1,217
Wickets	9
Bowling average	61.11
5 wickets in innings	–
10 wickets in match	–
Best bowling	2/140
Catches/stumpings	2/–
- Source: Cricinfo, 27 February 2012

Frank Gibb (18 January 1868 – 23 March 1957) was an English cricketer. Gibb's batting style is unknown, although it is known he was a left-arm fast bowler. He was born at Wadhurst, Sussex.

Gibb made his first-class debut for Sussex against the Marylebone Cricket Club in 1890 at Lord's. He made nine further first-class appearances for Sussex in that season, the last of which came against Kent at the County Ground, Hove. Gibb's main role was a bowler, in his ten first-class matches for Sussex, he took 9 wickets at an expensive average of 61.11, with best figures of 2/140. With the bat, he scored 41 runs at a batting average of 3.41, with a high score of 8.

He died at Hawkenbury, Kent, on 23 March 1957.
