= Franklin County Courthouse, Southern District =

- U.S. National Register of Historic Places
- U.S. Historic district – Contributing property
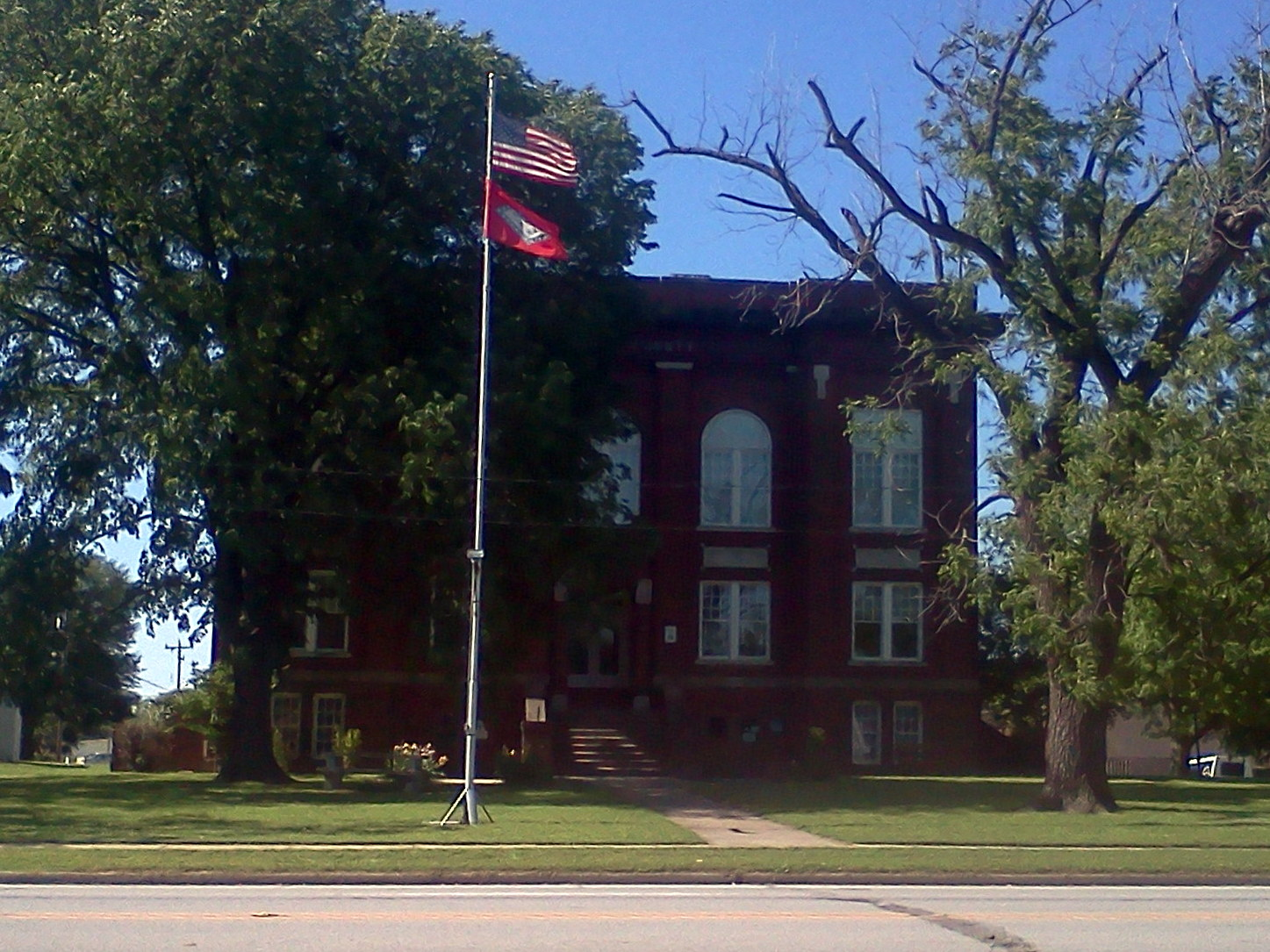

- Location within Arkansas Location within the United States
- Location: AR 22, Charleston, Arkansas
- Coordinates: 35°17′47″N 94°2′11″W
- Area: less than one acre
- Built: 1923
- Architect: Frank W. Gibb
- Part of: Charleston Commercial Historic District (ID76000407)
- NRHP reference No.: 76000407

Significant dates
- Added to NRHP: October 18, 1976
- Designated CP: May 29, 2008

The Franklin County Courthouse, Southern District is located at 607 East Main Street (Arkansas Highway 22) in Charleston, Arkansas. It is a 2 1/2-story brick building, its bays divided by brick pilasters, and its roof topping a metal cornice. Its entrance is framed by brick pilasters with cast stone heads, and topped by a round arch with a cast stone keystone. The building was built in 1923 to a design by Little Rock architect Frank Gibb.

The building was listed on the National Register of Historic Places in 1976.

== See also ==
- List of county courthouses in Arkansas
- National Register of Historic Places listings in Franklin County, Arkansas
