= Logan County Courthouse, Southern Judicial District =

- U.S. National Register of Historic Places
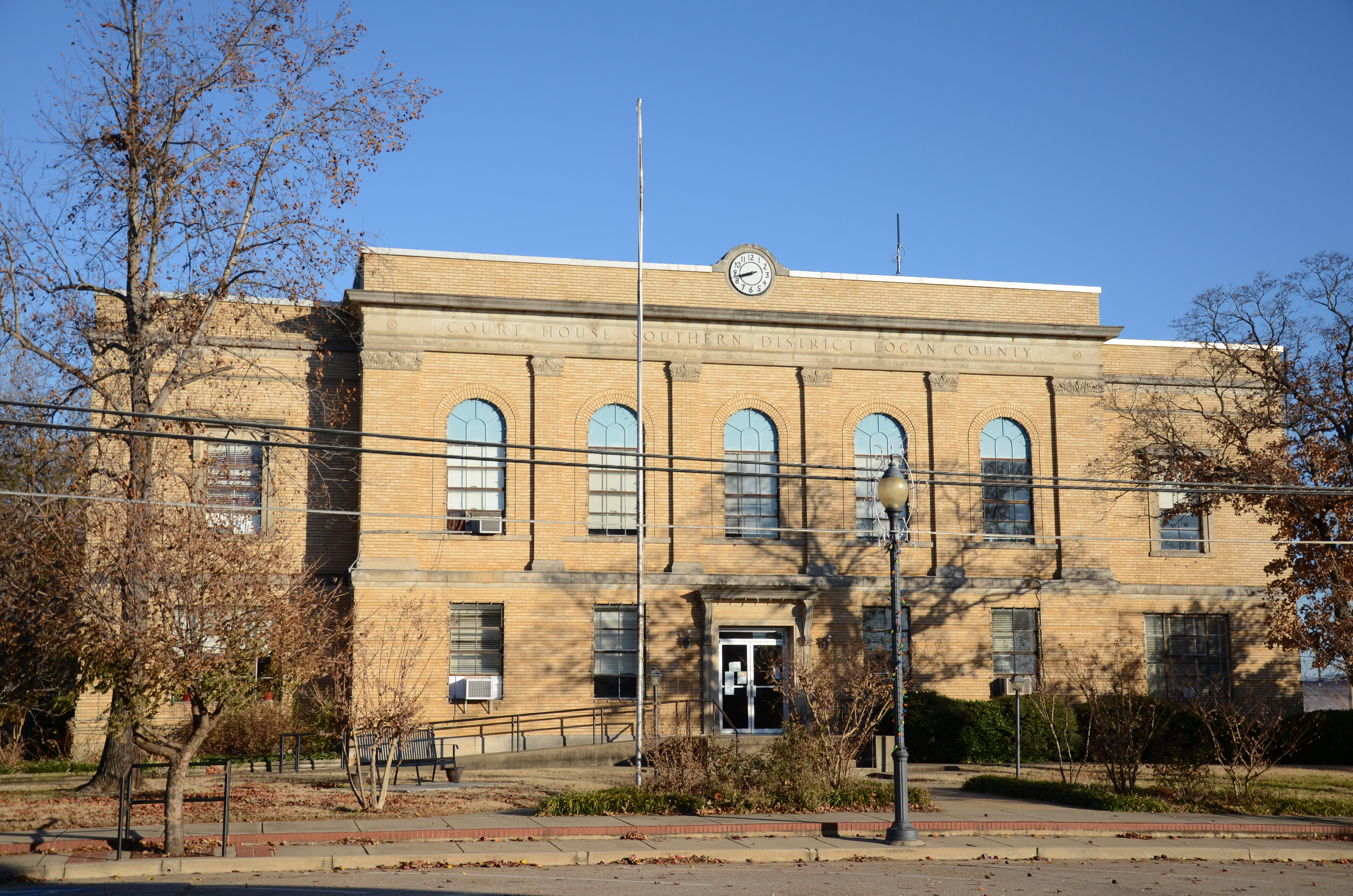

- Location within Arkansas Location within the United States
- Location: 366 N. Broadway Ave., Booneville, Arkansas
- Coordinates: 35°8′28″N 93°55′17″W
- Area: less than one acre
- Built: 1928
- Built by: J. Kyle Fraser
- Architect: Haralson & Nelson
- Architectural style: Italian Renaissance
- NRHP reference No.: 97000207
- Added to NRHP: March 8, 1997

The Logan County Courthouse, Southern Judicial District is a historic courthouse in Booneville, Arkansas, one of two county seats of Logan County. It is a three-story masonry building, built out of buff brick with limestone trim. It is stylistically in a restrained version of Italian Renaissance styling, with arched windows on the second level separated by pilasters with limestone capitals and bases. It is the second courthouse for the southern district of Logan County, built on the site of the first.

The building was listed on the National Register of Historic Places in 1997.

== See also ==
- National Register of Historic Places listings in Logan County, Arkansas
