= White County Courthouse (Arkansas) =

- U.S. National Register of Historic Places
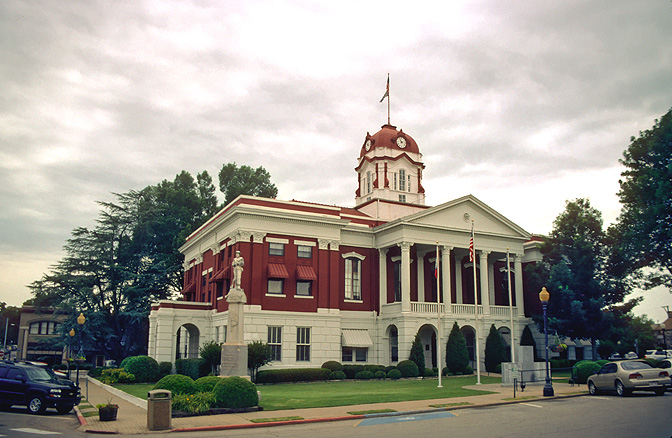

- Location within Arkansas Location within the United States
- Location: Court Sq., Searcy, Arkansas
- Coordinates: 35°15′17″N 91°44′16″W
- Area: less than one acre
- Built: 1871
- Architect: M.H. Baldwin, Frank Gibb
- Architectural style: Classical Revival
- NRHP reference No.: 77000279
- Added to NRHP: August 3, 1977

The White County Courthouse is located at Court Square in the center of Searcy, Arkansas, the county seat of White County. It is a two-story structure, built out of stone and brick, with a hip roof capped by an elaborate cupola with clock faces in its bowed roof. The building is roughly H-shaped, with wings at the sides that project slightly to the front and rear. The ground floor is faced in dressed stone, while the upper floor is finished in brick. Entrance is made through an arcade of rounded arches, which support a Greek pedimented temple projection that has four fluted Corinthian columns. The courthouse was built in 1871 and enlarged by the addition of the wings in 1912. In addition, repairs were conducted by the Civil Works Administration in 1933.

The building was listed on the National Register of Historic Places in 1977.

== See also ==
- National Register of Historic Places listings in White County, Arkansas
