= Dallas County Courthouse (Arkansas) =

- U.S. National Register of Historic Places
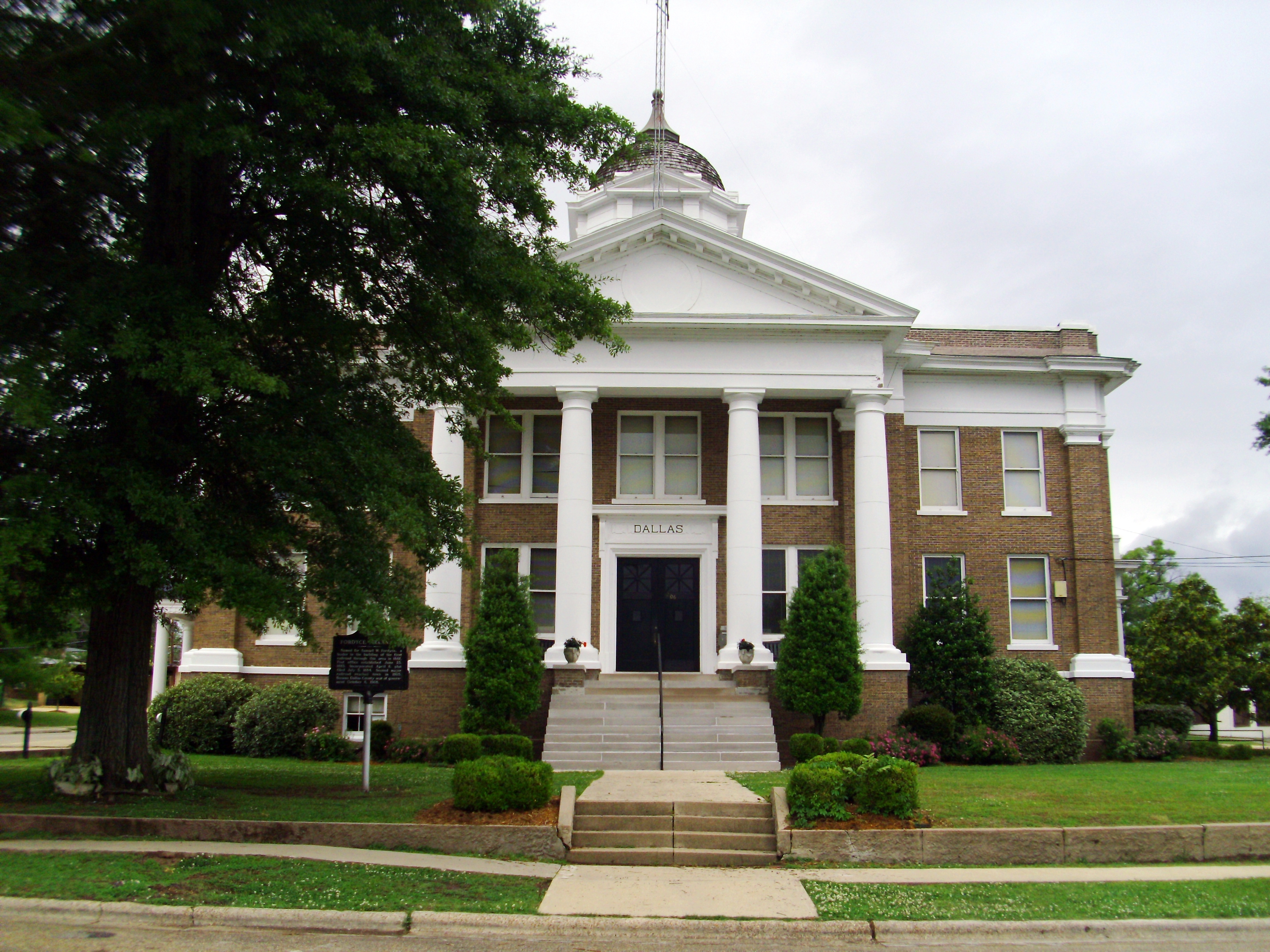

- Location within Arkansas Location within the United States
- Interactive map showing the location of Dallas County Courthouse
- Location: 3rd and Oak Sts., Fordyce, Arkansas
- Coordinates: 33°48′45″N 92°24′49″W
- Built: 1911
- Architect: Frank W. Gibb; Edgar Koonce
- Architectural style: Classical Revival
- MPS: Dallas County MRA
- NRHP reference No.: 84000677
- Added to NRHP: March 27, 1984

The Dallas County Courthouse is located at the corner of Third and Oak Streets in Fordyce, Arkansas, the county seat of Dallas County. The two-story Classical Revival building was designed by Frank W. Gibb and built in 1911, three years after the county seat was moved to Fordyce from Princeton. It is the most substantial Classical Revival building in the county, and a representative early work of the architect.

The building was listed on the National Register of Historic Places in 1984.

== See also ==
- National Register of Historic Places listings in Dallas County, Arkansas
