= National Register of Historic Places listings in Franklin County, Arkansas =

Location of Franklin County in Arkansas

This is a list of the National Register of Historic Places listings in Franklin County, Arkansas.

This is intended to be a complete list of the properties and districts on the National Register of Historic Places in Franklin County, Arkansas, United States. The locations of National Register properties and districts for which the latitude and longitude coordinates are included below, may be seen in a map.

There are 23 properties and districts listed on the National Register in the county, and two former listings.

Contents: Counties in Arkansas
- Arkansas
- Ashley
- Baxter
- Benton
- Boone
- Bradley
- Calhoun
- Carroll
- Chicot
- Clark
- Clay
- Cleburne
- Cleveland
- Columbia
- Conway
- Craighead
- Crawford
- Crittenden
- Cross
- Dallas
- Desha
- Drew
- Faulkner
- Franklin
- Fulton
- Garland
- Grant
- Greene
- Hempstead
- Hot Spring
- Howard
- Independence
- Izard
- Jackson
- Jefferson
- Johnson
- Lafayette
- Lawrence
- Lee
- Lincoln
- Little River
- Logan
- Lonoke
- Madison
- Marion
- Miller
- Mississippi
- Monroe
- Montgomery
- Nevada
- Newton
- Ouachita
- Perry
- Phillips
- Pike
- Poinsett
- Polk
- Pope
- Prairie
- Pulaski (Little Rock)
- Randolph
- St. Francis
- Saline
- Scott
- Searcy
- Sebastian
- Sevier
- Sharp
- Stone
- Union
- Van Buren
- Washington
- White
- Woodruff
- Yell

This National Park Service list is complete through NPS recent listings posted October 30, 2026.

== Current listings ==
	Name on the Register	Image	Date listed	Location	City or town	Description
1	Altus Well Shed-Gazebo	Altus Well Shed-Gazebo	September 12, 1996 (#96001005)	Northwestern corner of the junction of N. Franklin and E. Main Sts. 35°26′46″N 93°45′44″W	Altus	
2	Bristow Hotel	Bristow Hotel	February 18, 1999 (#99000225)	112 S. 2nd St. 35°29′10″N 93°49′33″W	Ozark	
3	Center Cross School	Center Cross School	October 8, 1992 (#92001351)	County Road 95, west of Altus; 35°26′14″N 93°47′17″W	Altus	
4	Charleston Commercial Historic District	Charleston Commercial Historic District	May 29, 2008 (#08000462)	Main St. roughly from Highway 217 to Tilden St. 35°17′50″N 94°02′15″W	Charleston	
5	First Methodist Episcopal Church, South	First Methodist Episcopal Church, South	September 4, 1992 (#92001154)	503 W. Commercial St. 35°29′13″N 93°49′46″W	Ozark	
6	Franklin County Courthouse	Franklin County Courthouse	September 22, 1995 (#95001123)	211 W. Commercial St. 35°29′11″N 93°49′36″W	Ozark	
7	Franklin County Court House Marker		May 22, 2026 (#100013028)	211 W. Commercial St. 35°29′11″N 93°49′36″W	Ozark	
8	Franklin County Courthouse, Southern District	Franklin County Courthouse, Southern District	October 18, 1976 (#76000407)	Highway 22; 35°17′47″N 94°02′11″W	Charleston	
9	Franklin County Jail	Franklin County Jail	June 23, 1982 (#82002114)	3rd and River Sts. 35°29′06″N 93°49′37″W	Ozark	
10	German-American Bank	German-American Bank	September 13, 1990 (#90001448)	Junction of Franklin and Main Sts. 35°26′47″N 93°45′42″W	Altus	
11	Gray Spring Recreation Area-Forest Service Road 1003 Historic District	Gray Spring Recreation Area-Forest Service Road 1003 Historic District	September 11, 1995 (#94001616)	Forest Service Rd. 1003 in the Ozark-St. Francis National Forest; 35°40′16″N 93°54′14″W	Cass	
12	Johnson County Line-Ozark-Crawford County Line Road, Altus Segment	Johnson County Line-Ozark-Crawford County Line Road, Altus Segment	February 24, 2010 (#10000033)	Connector Rd. between Robin Way and Pierce Rd. 35°28′25″N 93°46′52″W	Altus	
13	Missouri-Pacific Depot-Altus	Missouri-Pacific Depot-Altus	July 8, 1992 (#92000597)	U.S. Highway 64; 35°26′48″N 93°45′45″W	Altus	
14	Missouri-Pacific Depot-Ozark	Missouri-Pacific Depot-Ozark	June 11, 1992 (#92000598)	South of the junction of River and 1st Sts. 35°29′06″N 93°49′31″W	Ozark	
15	Mulberry River Bridge	Mulberry River Bridge	January 24, 2007 (#06001275)	Highway 23; 35°40′18″N 93°49′46″W	Turner's Bend	
16	O'Kane-Jacobs House	O'Kane-Jacobs House	May 14, 1991 (#91000585)	Rossville Rd. 35°26′34″N 93°45′41″W	Altus	
17	Our Lady of Perpetual Help Church	Our Lady of Perpetual Help Church	May 3, 1976 (#76000406)	North of Altus; 35°27′08″N 93°45′30″W	Altus	
18	Ozark Courthouse Square Historic District	Ozark Courthouse Square Historic District	December 27, 2002 (#02001599)	Roughly W. Commercial, W. Main, 2nd, and 3rd Sts. on Courthouse Sq. 35°29′11″N 93°49′36″W	Ozark	
19	Shelton-Rich Farmstead	Shelton-Rich Farmstead	November 20, 1989 (#89001423)	Address Restricted	Webb City	
20	Singleton Family Cemetery	Singleton Family Cemetery	September 28, 2005 (#05001074)	Highway 22; 35°17′47″N 94°04′41″W	Charleston	
21	Smith Creek Bridge		May 5, 2025 (#100011812)	Oak Bend Road over Smith Creek; 35°24′43″N 93°52′45″W	Webb City	
22	Merle Whitman Tourist Cabin	Merle Whitman Tourist Cabin	November 8, 2006 (#06000980)	200 N. Bell St. 35°29′20″N 93°49′19″W	Ozark	
23	Wiederkehr Wine Cellar	Wiederkehr Wine Cellar	May 2, 1977 (#77000252)	North of Altus at St. Mary's Mountain; 35°32′56″N 93°45′04″W	Altus	

== Former listings ==
	Name on the Register	Image	Date listed	Date removed	Location	City or town	Description
1	The Cabins		April 13, 1977 (#77000253)	July 20, 2000	W of Ozark on AR 219	Ozark	Also known as the Deane Summer Home.
2	Mulberry River Bridge	Mulberry River Bridge	January 24, 2007 (#06001272)	April 30, 2024	County Road 67; 35°31′57″N 94°02′27″W	Pleasant Hill	Extends into Crawford County

== See also ==
- List of National Historic Landmarks in Arkansas
- National Register of Historic Places listings in Arkansas
