= Shelton-Rich Farmstead =

Historic house in Arkansas, United States

- U.S. National Register of Historic Places
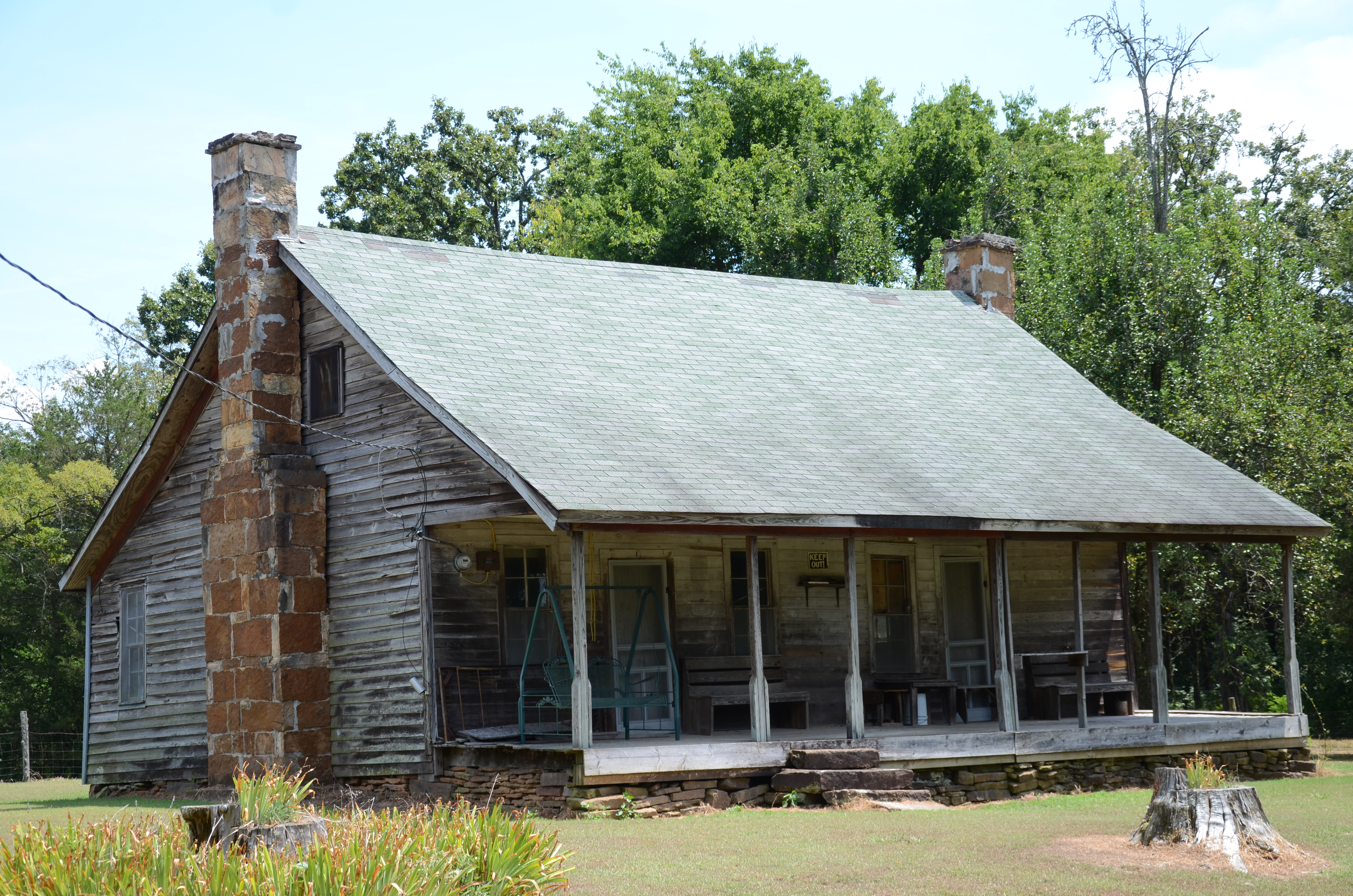
- Nearest city: Webb City, Arkansas
- Area: 80 acres (32 ha)
- Built: 1880; 146 years ago
- Architectural style: Late Victorian, Folk Victorian
- NRHP reference No.: 89001423
- Added to NRHP: November 20, 1989

The Shelton-Rich Farmstead is a historic farm property in rural Franklin County, Arkansas. The property consists of 80 acres (32 ha) of land, whose principal built feature is a farmhouse, along with a well, stone walls, and the Shelton family cemetery. The farmhouse is a two-story log structure, finished in weatherboard, with two stone chimneys. The house was built in stages, the earliest of which was c. 1880. The house is one of the oldest surviving buildings in the county.

The property was listed on the National Register of Historic Places in 1989.

== See also ==
- National Register of Historic Places listings in Franklin County, Arkansas
