= Florence McRaven =

American politician (1877-1975)

Florence McRaven (May 11, 1877 - October 22, 1975) was a member of the Arkansas House of Representatives from 1927 to 1930.

== Early life and education ==
McRaven was born on May 11, 1877, in Tate County, Mississippi. She had fourteen siblings. In 1878, her family moved to Arkansas, where her father became a deputy sheriff for Franklin County. McRaven attended the Central Collegiate Institute and earned a master's degree in English literature from Hiram and Lydia College in 1895. McRaven studied at the Chautauqua Institution several times over the course of her life.

== Career ==
McRaven started her career in the post office for Altus, Arkansas. She was active in the Pulaski County community, supporting women's educational funding and volunteering for the county library. McRaven worked as an investigator for the Arkansas Department of Labor from 1923 to 1925.

In 1926, McRaven launched a campaign for the Arkansas House of Representatives as a Democrat. Her only prior political involvement had been as a member of the Women of the Ku Klux Klan, a white supremacist group that otherwise ascribed to Progressive politics. Her campaign did not heavily rely on her status as a woman, rather, she disseminated promotional material arguing that she had the "right motives, intelligence, and strength of character" for the job. She won her election and was reelected in 1928.

While serving in the House, McRaven actively sponsored progressive legislation, especially legislation relating to the rights of female workers. She supported efforts to end capital punishment and to promote the teaching of evolution in schools. She opposed other efforts to combine church and state, arguing that recreational activities such as baseball should be allowed on Sundays.

McRaven ran for the Arkansas Senate in 1930. She was the first female candidate for the Arkansas Senate in the state's history. She lost the race, coming in fifth. After losing, she worked at the Pulaski County Courthouse and campaigned for John L. McClellan and Benjamin T. Laney. She also wrote an autobiography titled Swift Current which was published in 1954.

== Personal life ==
McRaven married John Sanders McRaven in 1898. The two had three children. She was an aunt to the novelist Janice Holt Giles. McRaven died on October 22, 1975.
