= Center Cross School =

- U.S. National Register of Historic Places
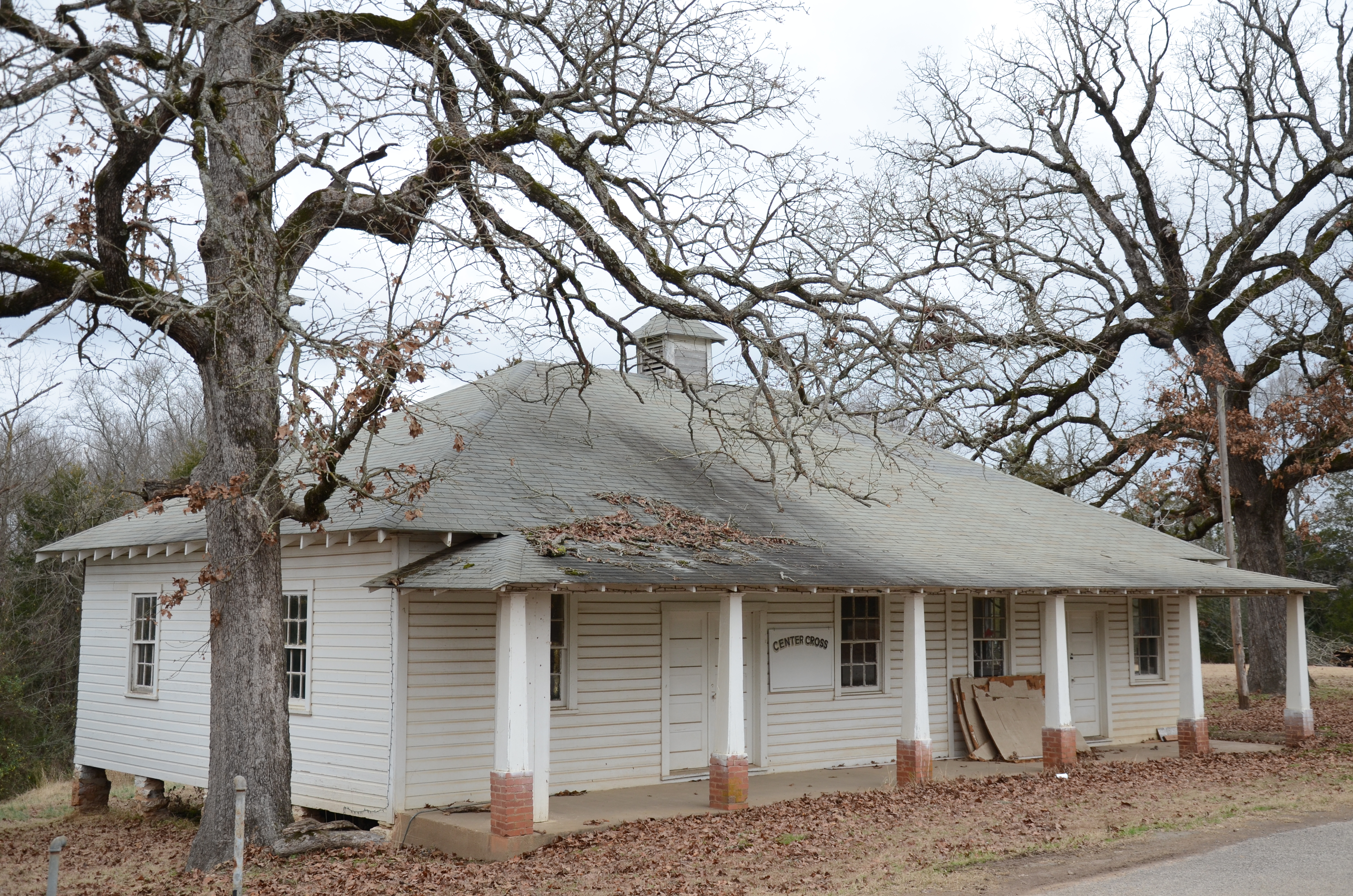

- Location within Arkansas Location within the United States
- Nearest city: Altus, Arkansas
- Coordinates: 35°26′14″N 93°47′17″W
- Area: less than one acre
- Architectural style: Late 19th and Early 20th Century American Movements, Plain Traditional
- MPS: Public Schools in the Ozarks MPS
- NRHP reference No.: 92001351
- Added to NRHP: October 8, 1992

The Center Cross School is a historic school building at the junction of West Creek Road and West College Road in rural Franklin County, Arkansas, west of Altus. It is an L-shaped single-story wood-frame building, with a hip roof and weatherboard siding. A porch extends across the long front, the main roof extending over it, with box columns for support. The school was built in 1930, during a period of prosperity.

The school was listed on the National Register of Historic Places in 1992.

== See also ==
- National Register of Historic Places listings in Franklin County, Arkansas
