= Arkansas Highway 186 =

State highway in Arkansas, United States

Highway 186

Route information
- Maintained by ArDOT
- Length: 9.54 mi (15.35 km)

Major junctions
- South end: CR 97 at Alix
- US 64 in Altus; I-40 in Wiederkehr Village
- North end: CR 90 in Wiederkehr Village

Location
- Country: United States
- State: Arkansas
- Counties: Franklin

Highway system
- Arkansas Highway System; Interstate; US; State; Business; Spurs; Suffixed; Scenic; Heritage
← AR 185	→ AR 187

Highway 186 (AR 186, Ark. 186, and Hwy. 186) is an east–west state highway in Franklin County, Arkansas. The route of 9.54 miles (15.35 km) runs north from Coal Road at Alix through Altus to Philpot Road north of Interstate 40.

== Route description ==
The route begins at County Route 97 (Coal Road) at Alix and runs north and west to Altus. After crossing US 64, AR 186 continues north to pass the Our Lady of Perpetual Help Church, which is listed on the National Register of Historic Places, and enter the Wiederhekr Village corporate limits. The road meets I-40 at exit 41 at a full interchange. Highway 186 continues north to terminate at County Road 90 (Philpot Road).

== Major intersections ==
The entire route is in Franklin County.

Location	mi	km	Destinations	Notes
Alix	0.00	0.00	CR 97 (Coal Road)	southern terminus
Altus	3.22	5.18	US 64 (Park Street) to I-40 – Coal Hill, Clarksville, Ozark, Alma	
Wiederkehr Village	9.21	14.82	I-40 – Little Rock, Fort Smith	
Wiederkehr Village	9.54	15.35	CR 90 (Philpot Road)	northern terminus
1.000 mi = 1.609 km; 1.000 km = 0.621 mi

== See also ==
- List of state highways in Arkansas
