= Altus Well Shed-Gazebo =

Historic place in Arkansas, United States

- U.S. National Register of Historic Places
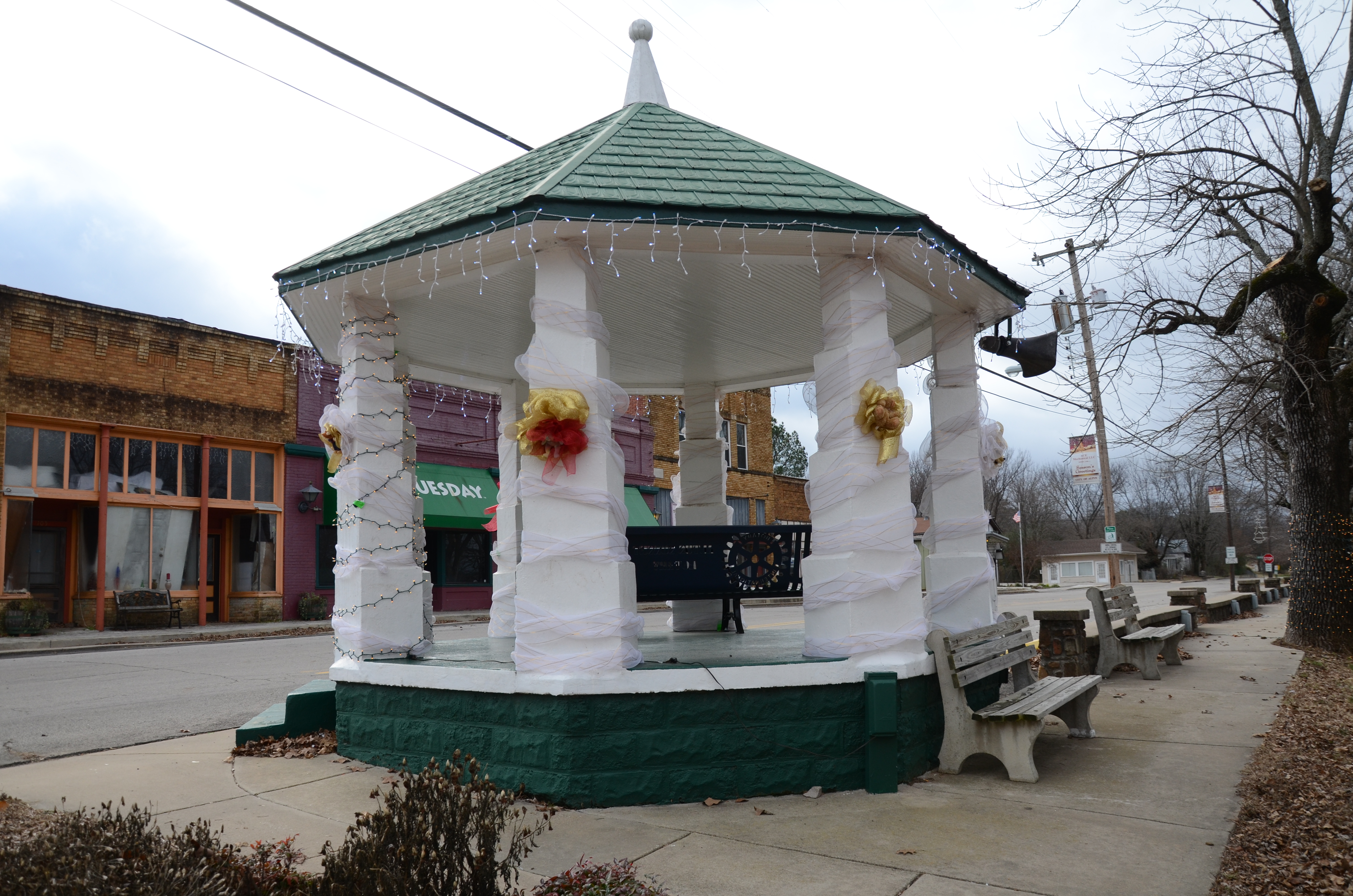

- Location within Arkansas Location within the United States
- Location: Jct. of N. Franklin and E. Main Sts., NW corner, Altus, Arkansas
- Coordinates: 35°26′46″N 93°45′44″W
- Area: less than one acre
- NRHP reference No.: 96001005
- Added to NRHP: September 12, 1996

The Altus Well Shed-Gazebo is a gazebo located adjacent to the central city park of Altus, Arkansas, near the junction of Franklin and Main Streets. It is an octagonal structure, set on a foundation of cast concrete blocks, with eight stepped columns (also of concrete blocks) supporting a wooden roof frame with a metal shingle roof and finial. The gazebo was built about 1920 covering a well that is believed to have been built in 1888, around the time a branch railroad line was built from Altus to a nearby coal mining area.

The gazebo was listed on the National Register of Historic Places in 1996.

== See also ==
- National Register of Historic Places listings in Franklin County, Arkansas
