= O'Kane-Jacobs House =

Historic house in Arkansas, United States

- U.S. National Register of Historic Places
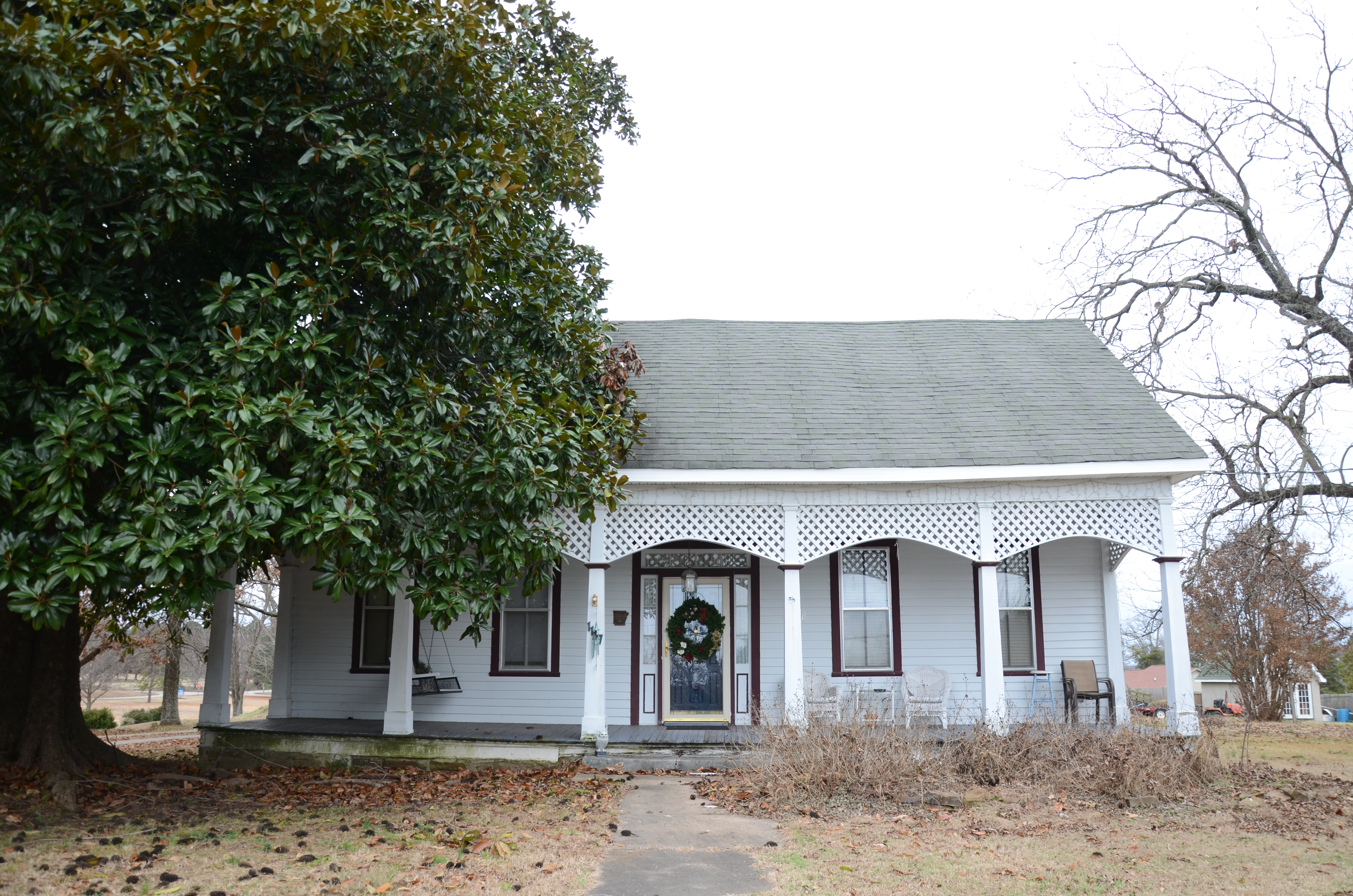

- Location within Arkansas Location within the United States
- Location: Rossville Rd., Altus, Arkansas
- Coordinates: 35°26′34″N 93°45′41″W
- Area: 9.5 acres (3.8 ha)
- Built: 1914
- NRHP reference No.: 91000585
- Added to NRHP: May 14, 1991

The O'Kane-Jacobs House is a historic house on Rossville Road in Altus, Arkansas. It is a single story wood-frame structure, with a single pile and an original ell extending to the west. It has a cross-gable roof and weatherboard siding. Its front is sheltered by a recessed porch supported by round columns, with a distinctive latticework frieze. Built in 1881 by Francis Paine, it was purchased in 1891 by Colonel W. S. O'Kane, a prominent local businessman who owned orchards and a fruit shipping business.

The house was listed on the National Register of Historic Places in 1991.

== See also ==
- National Register of Historic Places listings in Franklin County, Arkansas
