= Gray Spring Recreation Area =

- Gray Spring Recreation Area--Forest Service Road 1003 Historic District
- U.S. National Register of Historic Places
- U.S. Historic district
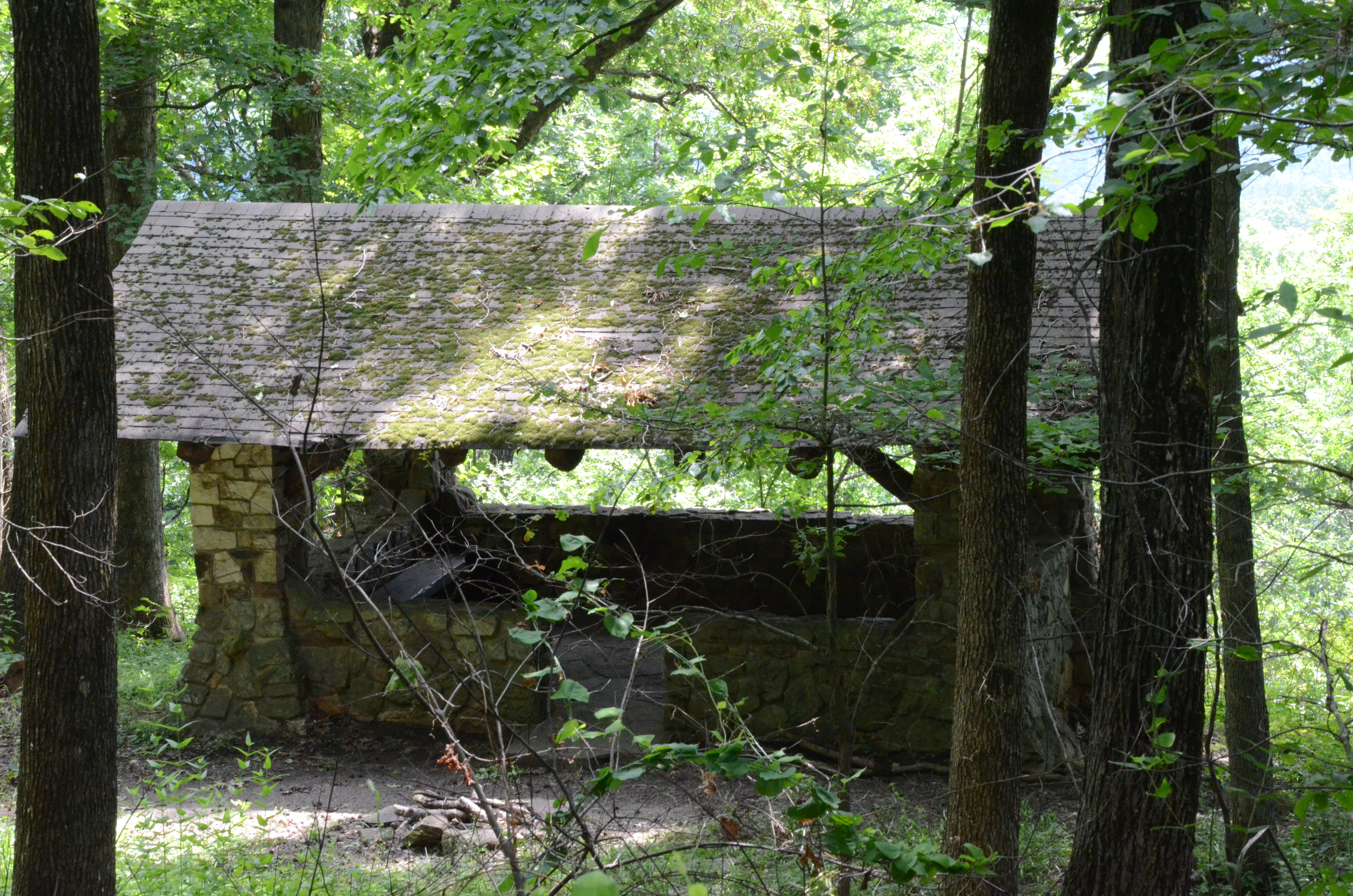
- The picnic shelter

- Location within Arkansas Location within the United States
- Nearest city: Cass, Arkansas
- Area: 60 acres (24 ha)
- Built: 1934
- Built by: Civilian Conservation Corps
- Architectural style: Rustic
- MPS: Facilities Constructed by the CCC in Arkansas MPS
- NRHP reference No.: 94001616
- Added to NRHP: September 11, 1995

The Gray Spring Recreation Area is a picnic area with scenic views in the Ozark-St. Francis National Forest of northwestern Arkansas. It is located on northern Franklin County, on Forest Road 1003, and includes a picnic shelter, comfort facilities, an outdoor barbecue pit, and picnic tables. The picnic area and Forest Road 1003 were built in 1934 by a crew from the Civilian Conservation Corps, and were listed on the National Register of Historic Places in 1995. The road, which winds precariously around Black Mountain, retains a number of surviving CCC-built features, including a bridge and many stone culverts.

== See also ==
- National Register of Historic Places listings in Franklin County, Arkansas
