= German-American Bank =

German-American Bank may refer to two buildings operated by the bank of the same name:

- German-American Bank Building (Altus, Arkansas)
- German-American Bank Building (St. Joseph, Missouri)
