= Merle Whitman Tourist Cabin =

Historic tourist building in Arkansas, United States

- U.S. National Register of Historic Places
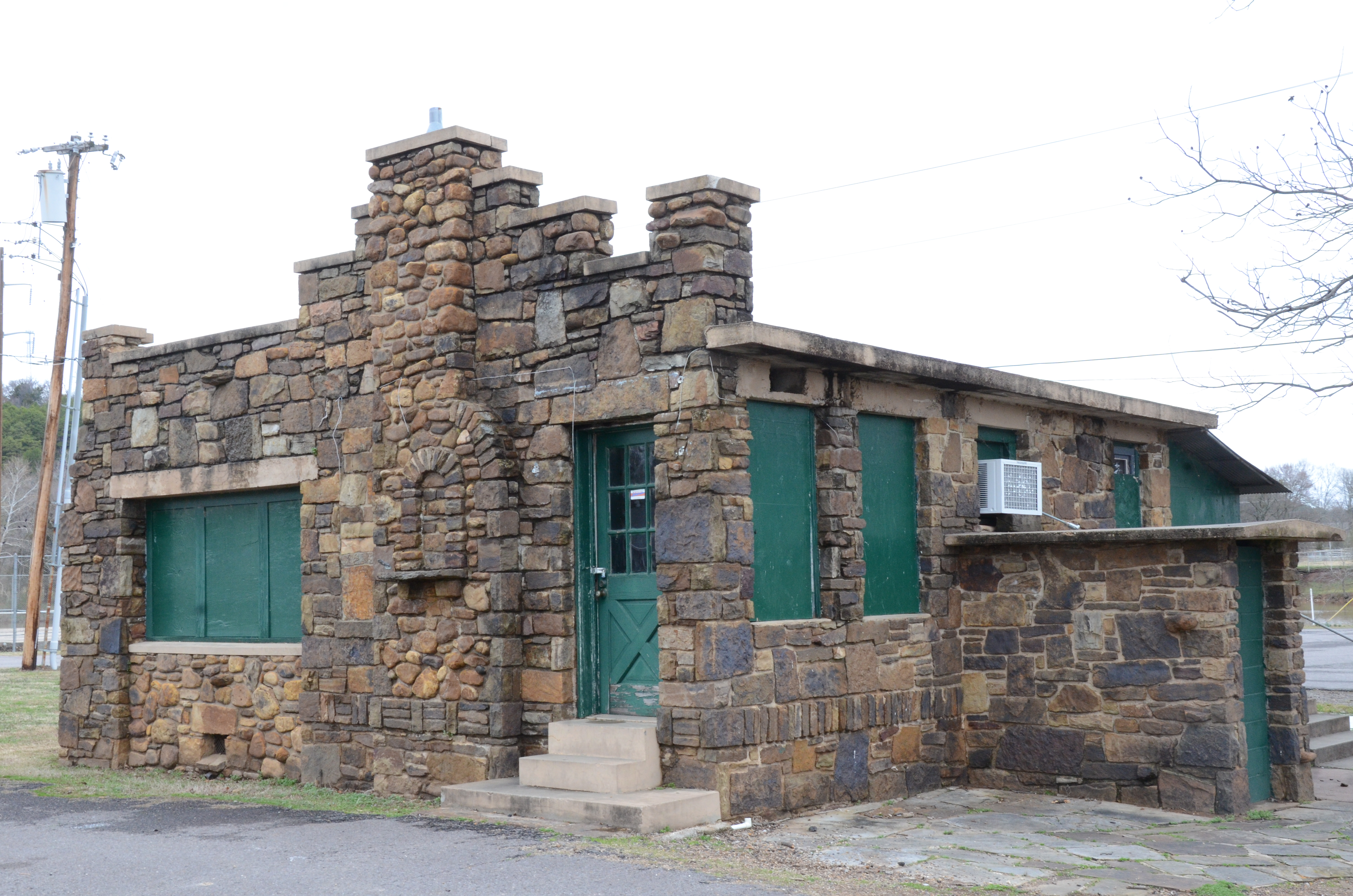

- Location within Arkansas Location within the United States
- Location: 200 N. Bell St., Ozark, Arkansas
- Coordinates: 35°29′20″N 93°49′19″W
- Area: less than one acre
- Built: 1933
- Architect: Ed Taylor, Sam Langford
- MPS: Arkansas Highway History and Architecture MPS
- NRHP reference No.: 06000980
- Added to NRHP: November 8, 2006

The Merle Whitman Tourist Cabin is a historic traveler's accommodation at 200 North Bell Street in Ozark, Arkansas. It is a distinctively styled vernacular structure, built out of local fieldstone, cut sandstone, and concrete. Built in 1933–34, it is the only known tourist building in Franklin County using this combination of materials. It was used as tourist accommodation until the 1960s, when it was purchased by the United States Army Corps of Engineers as part of land taking for the Jeta Taylor Lock and Dam project. It housed the offices of the local chamber of commerce between 1966 and 1995.

The cabin was listed on the National Register of Historic Places in 2006.

== See also ==
- National Register of Historic Places listings in Franklin County, Arkansas
