= Wiederkehr Wine Cellar =

- U.S. National Register of Historic Places
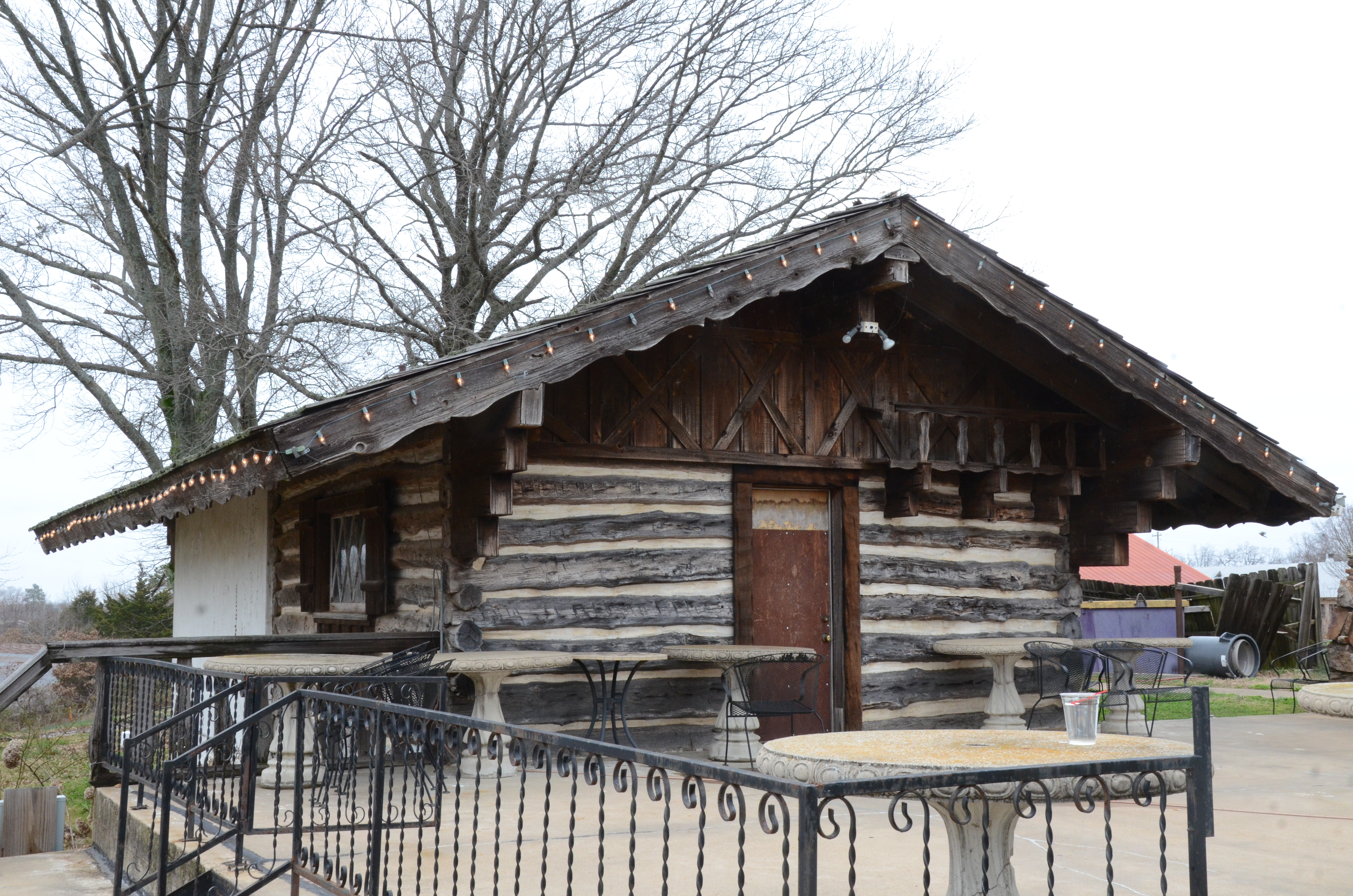

- Location within Arkansas Location within the United States
- Nearest city: Altus, Arkansas
- Coordinates: 35°32′56″N 93°45′4″W
- Area: less than one acre
- Architect: Wiederkehr, John
- NRHP reference No.: 77000252
- Added to NRHP: May 2, 1977

The Wiederkehr Wine Cellar is a historic wine cellar in Franklin County, Arkansas. It is located north of Altus, on the grounds of the Wiederkehr Winery. It presently houses the winery's restaurant. The cellar was dug by hand, by the winery's founder, John Wiederkehr, with a native stone floor and heavy wooden posts supporting its ceiling. An addition c. 1900 gave the cellar an L shape. The cellar is topped by a log house, also built by Wiederkehr when he built the cellar. The winery is one of the oldest in Arkansas.

The cellar was listed on the National Register of Historic Places in 1977.

== See also ==
- National Register of Historic Places listings in Franklin County, Arkansas
