= Altus station =

- Missouri-Pacific Depot, Altus
- U.S. National Register of Historic Places
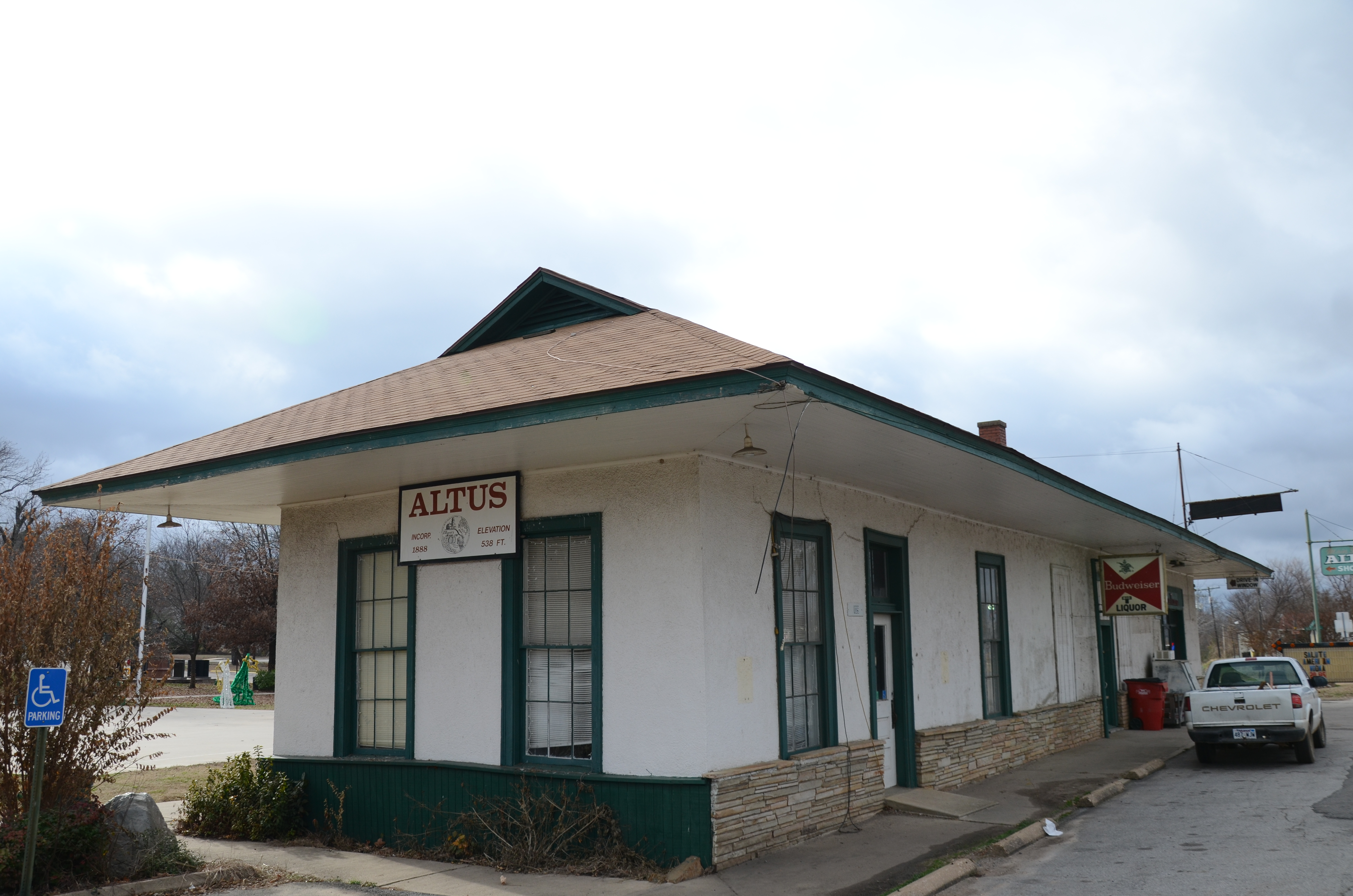

- Location within Arkansas Location within the United States
- Location: US 64, Altus, Arkansas
- Coordinates: 35°26′48″N 93°45′45″W
- Area: less than one acre
- Built: 1920
- Built by: Missouri-Pacific Railroad
- Architectural style: Late 19th And Early 20th Century American Movements
- MPS: Historic Railroad Depots of Arkansas MPS
- NRHP reference No.: 92000597
- Added to NRHP: July 8, 1992

The Missouri-Pacific Depot, Altus is a historic railroad station on United States Route 64 in Altus, Arkansas. It is a long rectangular single-story wood-frame structure, finished in stucco, with a gable-on-hip roof with broad eaves. It was built in 1920 by the Missouri-Pacific Railroad, and served as both a passenger and freight depot. It is representative of the town's early history as a railroad town.

The building was listed on the National Register of Historic Places in 1992.

== See also ==
- National Register of Historic Places listings in Franklin County, Arkansas

Preceding station	Missouri Pacific Railroad	Following station
Ozark toward Wichita	Little Rock – Wichita	Alix toward Little Rock
