= Singleton Family Cemetery =

Historic cemetery in Arkansas, United States

- U.S. National Register of Historic Places
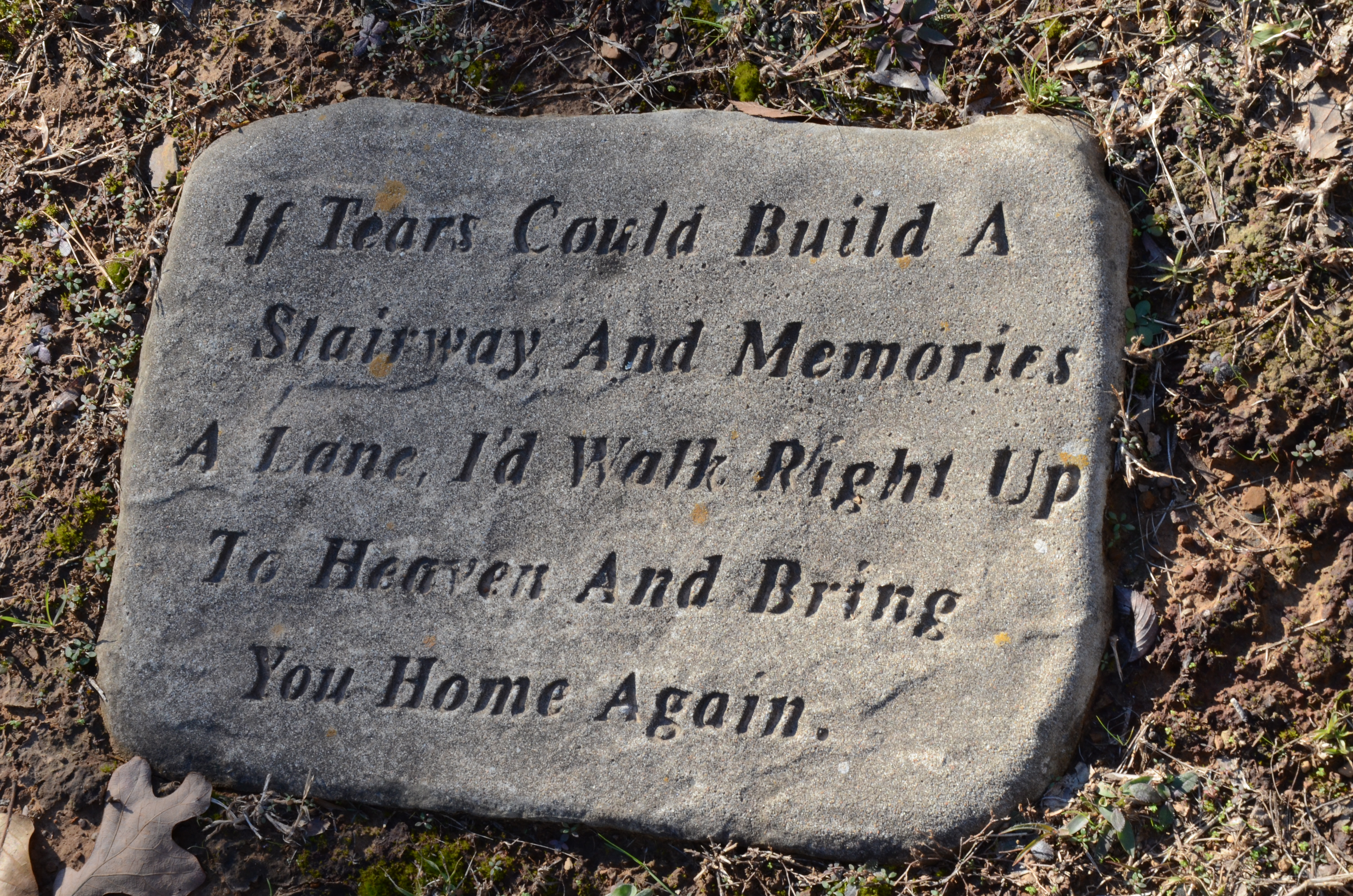

- Location within Arkansas Location within the United States
- Nearest city: Charleston, Arkansas
- Coordinates: 35°17′47″N 94°4′41″W
- Area: less than one acre
- NRHP reference No.: 05001074
- Added to NRHP: September 28, 2005

The Singleton Family Cemetery is a historic cemetery on the western outskirts of Charleston, Arkansas. Established in the 1870s, it contains more than 120 graves; approximately half of these are marked graves. It is the oldest site associated with the early formation of Charleston, and several of its earliest settlers are buried here. The most prominent grave is that of Julia Singleton Cormack, one of the community's first school teachers. The cemetery continues to be used by the Singleton family descendants.

The cemetery was listed on the National Register of Historic Places in 2005.

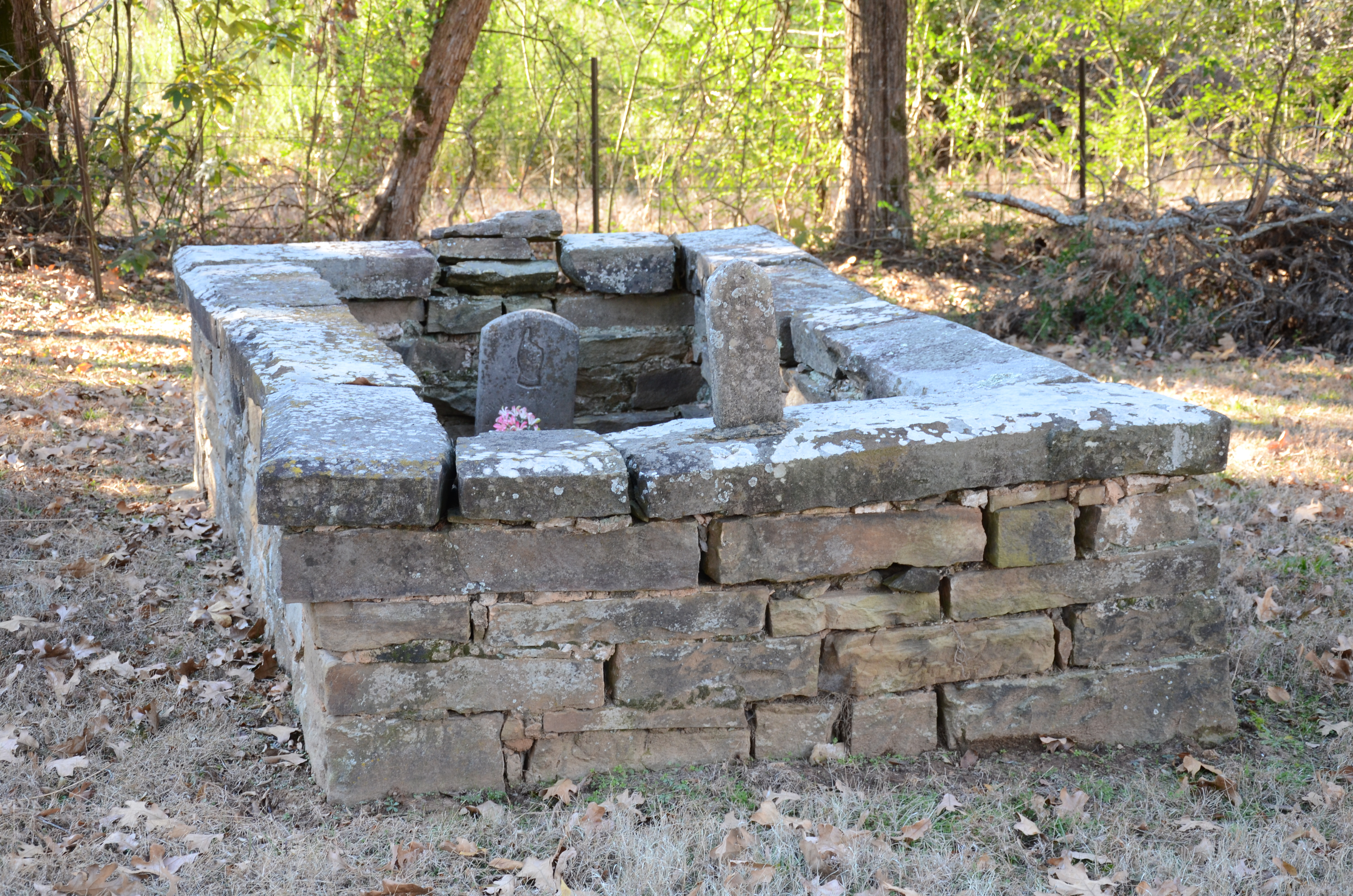
A Stone Plot

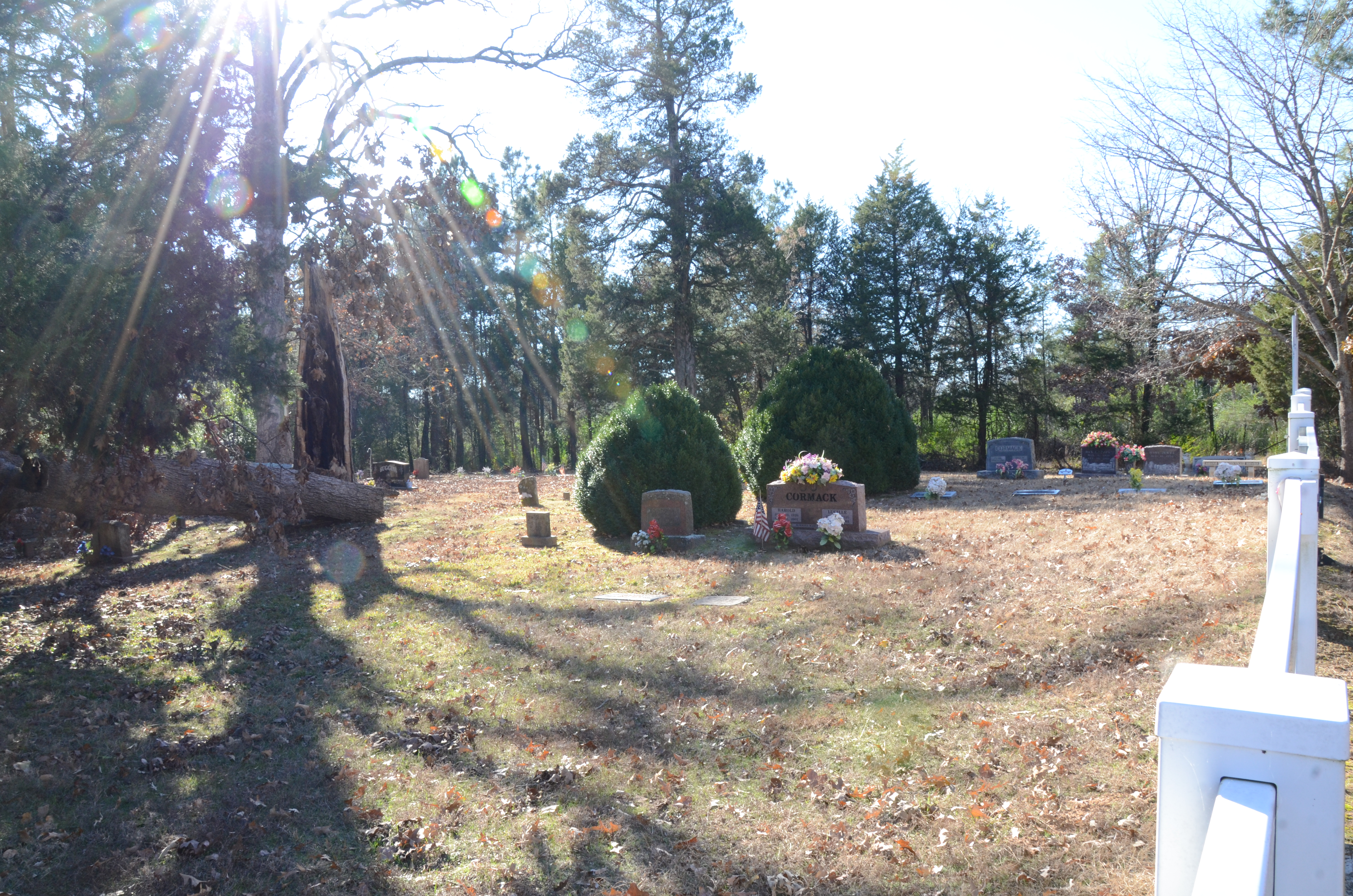
Looking West from inside the Cemetery

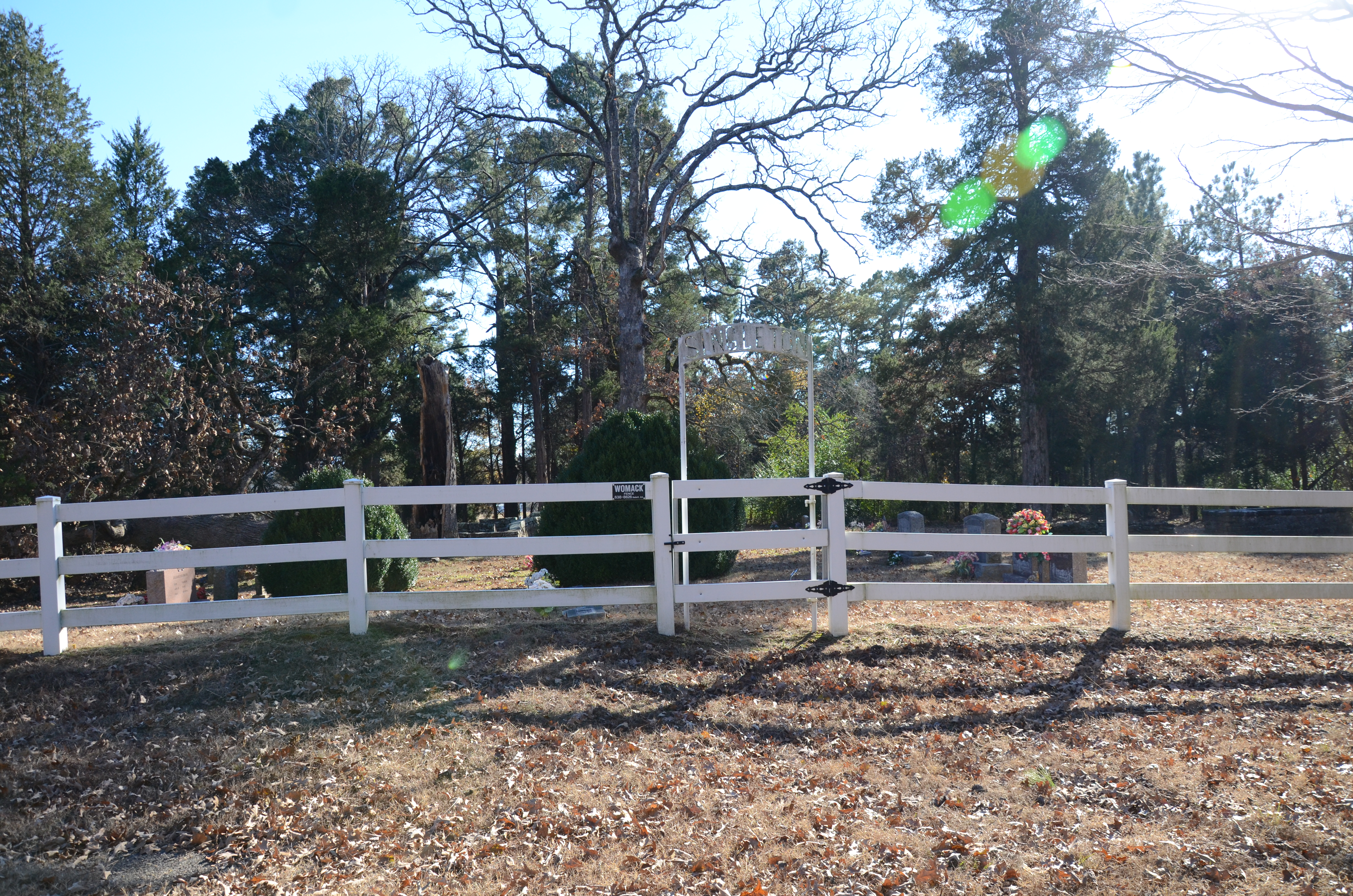
The Front Gate

== See also ==
- National Register of Historic Places listings in Franklin County, Arkansas
