= German-American Bank Building (Altus, Arkansas) =

- German-American Bank
- U.S. National Register of Historic Places
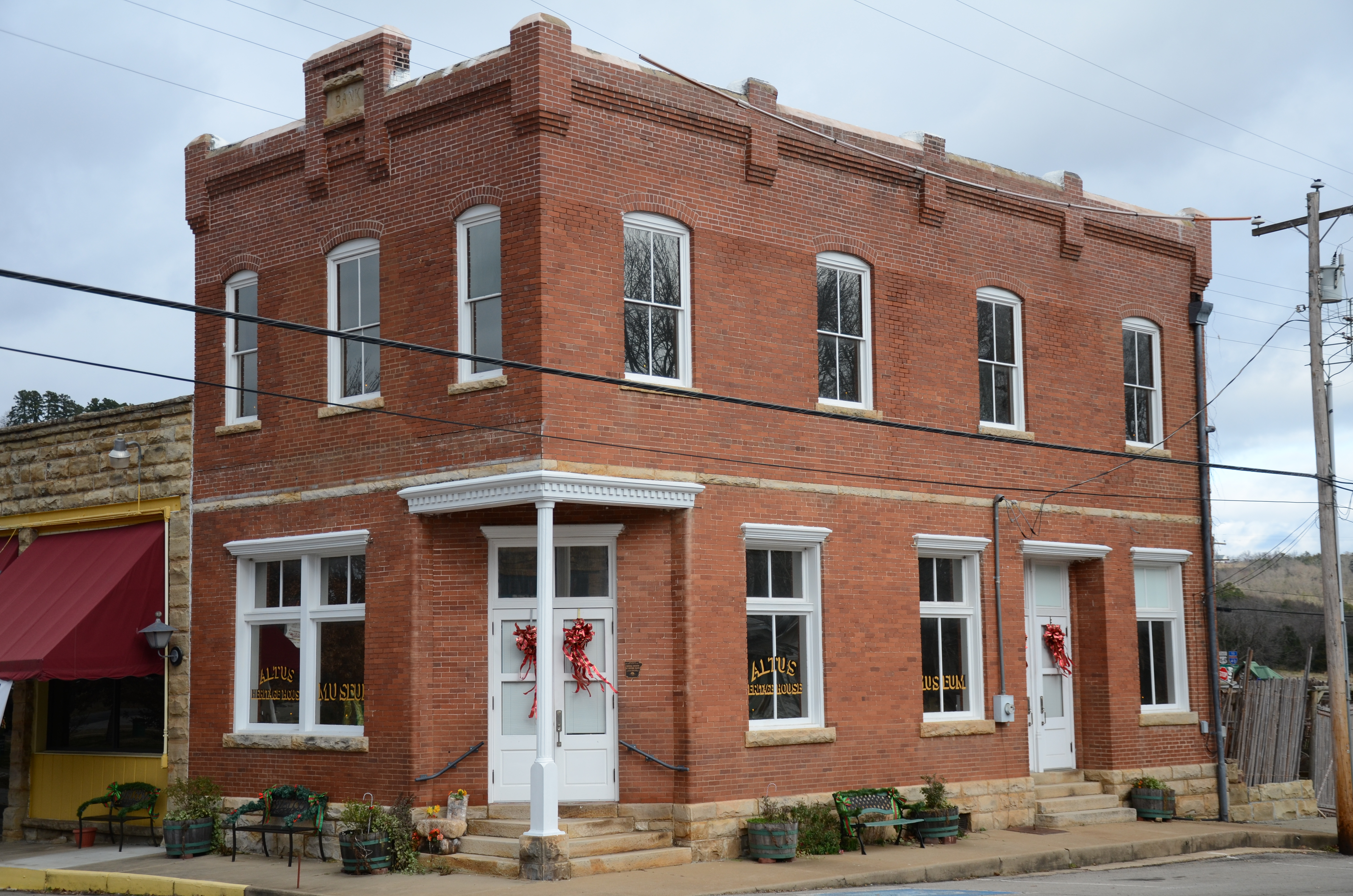

- Location within Arkansas Location within the United States
- Location: Jct. of Franklin and Main Sts., Altus, Arkansas
- Coordinates: 35°26′47″N 93°45′42″W
- Area: less than one acre
- Architectural style: Italianate, Plain traditional
- NRHP reference No.: 90001448
- Added to NRHP: September 13, 1990

The German-American Bank is a historic commercial building at Franklin and Main Streets in Altus, Arkansas. It is a two-story masonry structure, built out of red brick with a stone foundation and trim. It has an angled store entrance at the corner, sheltered by an overhang with a dentillated cornice and supported by a round column. Windows on the second level are set in segmented-arch openings, and the flat roof is obscured by a raised brick parapet. Built in 1905, it is Altus' finest example of commercial Italianate architecture.

The building was listed on the National Register of Historic Places in 1990.

== See also ==
- National Register of Historic Places listings in Franklin County, Arkansas
