= Franklin County Courthouse (Ozark, Arkansas) =

- U.S. National Register of Historic Places
- U.S. Historic district – Contributing property
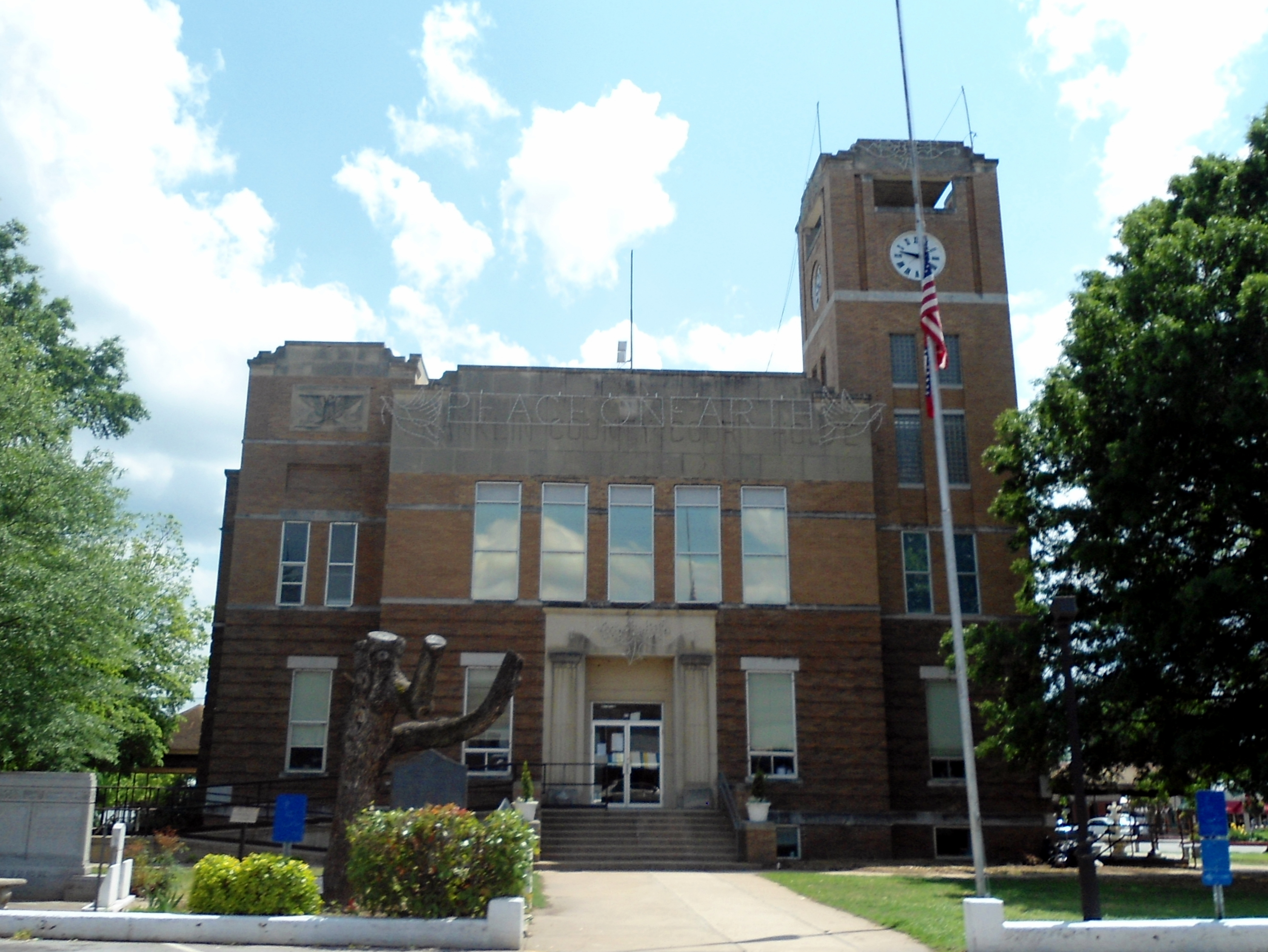

- Location within Arkansas Location within the United States
- Interactive map showing the location for Franklin County Courthouse
- Location: 211 W. Commercial St., Ozark, Arkansas
- Coordinates: 35°29′11″N 93°49′36″W
- Area: less than one acre
- Built: 1944
- Built by: Tom Eads (1944)
- Architect: Frank W. Gibb (1904); T. Ewing Shelton (1944)
- Architectural style: Classical Moderne
- Part of: Ozark Courthouse Square Historic District (ID02001599)
- NRHP reference No.: 95001123

Significant dates
- Added to NRHP: September 22, 1995
- Designated CP: December 27, 2002

The Franklin County Courthouse is located at 211 West Commercial Street in Ozark, the county seat of Franklin County, Arkansas. It is a two-story brick structure, with a tower prominently sited at one corner. The courthouse was built in 1904 to a design by Little Rock architect Frank W. Gibb, and originally had Italianate styling. It was extensively damaged by fire in 1944, and its upper level was rebuilt in a Classical Moderne style to a design by T. Ewing Sheldon, an architect from Fayetteville.

The courthouse was listed on the National Register of Historic Places in 1995.

== See also ==
- National Register of Historic Places listings in Franklin County, Arkansas
