= Sub Rosa, Arkansas =

Coordinates: 35.39175°N 93.94659°W

Sub Rosa is a ghost town in Franklin County, Arkansas, United States.

== History ==
Sub Rosa was considered a lively trading center in the 1880s with five businesses and seven dwelling houses. A post office called Sub Rosa was in operation from 1853 until 1911.
