= Johann Andreas Wiederkehr =

Swiss winemaker

Johann Andreas Wiederkehr was a Swiss-American winemaker, leather worker, and farmer. After immigrating to the United States in 1880, he opened a vineyard and winery in the Arkansas River Valley. He continued to make wine during Prohibition in the United States, having been granted special permission by the Catholic Church. He was the founder of Wiederkehr Village, Arkansas. His winery was added to the National Register of Historic Places.

== Biography ==
Wiederkehr was from the German-speaking region of Switzerland. He and his wife, Katherina, immigrated from Switzerland to the United States in 1880. They lived with Father Ziswyler, a Swiss Roman Catholic priest, until purchasing land in the Boston Mountains near the Arkansas Valley and building a cabin there. He operated his own farm, where he produced cheese, raised livestock, raised crops, and built furniture. Trained as a shoemaker and leatherworker in Switzerland, he also made a living making and repairing shoes. Wiederkehr started growing grapes and producing wine for his family and neighbors. His first large-scale customer was the Catholic Church in Arkansas, for which he produced sacramental wines. Soon he began selling wine to coal miners employed in the valley. He designed a winery in the Swiss Alpine style on St. Mary's Mountain near Altus, overlooking the Arkansas River.

Wiederkehr received a patent for his Campbell Early mutation grape.

During Prohibition in the United States, Wiederkehr was granted an ecclesiastical permit by the Bishop Edward Fitzgerald of Little Rock, which allowed him to continue wine making in order to produce sacramental wine.

Wiederkehr's winery and vineyard, located in Wiederkehr Village, is the oldest vineyard in continuous operation in Middle America. The winery's first cellars, hand-dug in 1880, are on the National Register of Historic Places.

Wiederkehr was a practicing Roman Catholic and attended St. Mary's Catholic Church in Altus.
