= Peanut, Arkansas =

- Unincorporated community
- Location within Arkansas Location within the United States
- Coordinates: 35°40′31″N 93°42′18″W
- Country: United States
- State: Arkansas
- County: Franklin
- Elevation: 846 ft (258 m)
- Time zone: UTC-6 (Central (CST))
  - Summer (DST): UTC-5 (CDT)
- GNIS feature ID: 73027

Peanut is an unincorporated community in eastern Franklin County, Arkansas, United States.

The settlement is located on the south edge of the Mulberry River floodplain at the confluence with Clear Creek and approximately one-half mile from the Franklin-Johnson county line. The community is within the Ozark–St. Francis National Forest. Ozark lies approximately thirteen miles to the south-southwest. Arkansas Highway 215 passes on the north side of the river floodplain.

Prior to 1945, the settlement was called "Taft", and Taft at one time had a post office.

In 1975, there was one house located in Peanut.
