= Alix, Arkansas =

- Census-designated place
- Location within Arkansas Location within the United States
- Coordinates: 35°25′29″N 93°43′50″W
- Country: United States
- State: Arkansas
- County: Franklin
- Elevation: 410 ft (120 m)

Population (2020)
  - Total: 100
- Time zone: UTC-6 (Central (CST))
  - Summer (DST): UTC-5 (CDT)
- ZIP code: 72820
- Area code: 479
- GNIS feature ID: 45824

Alix is an unincorporated community and census-designated place (CDP) in Franklin County, Arkansas, United States. Alix is located on Arkansas Highway 186, 1.5 miles (2.4 km) east of Denning. Alix has a post office with ZIP code 72820.

It was first listed as a CDP in the 2020 census with a population of 100.

== Demographics ==
Historical population
Census	Pop.	Note	%±
2020	100		—
U.S. Decennial Census; 2020

Alix first appeared as a census designated place in the 2020 U.S. census.

=== 2020 census ===
Alix CDP, Arkansas – Racial and ethnic composition Note: the U.S. census treats Hispanic/Latino as an ethnic category. This table excludes Latinos from the racial categories and assigns them to a separate category. Hispanics/Latinos may be of any race.
Race / Ethnicity (NH = Non-Hispanic)	Pop 2020	% 2020
White alone (NH)	86	86.00%
Black or African American alone (NH)	0	0.00%
Native American or Alaska Native alone (NH)	0	0.00%
Asian alone (NH)	0	0.00%
Pacific Islander alone (NH)	0	0.00%
Some Other Race alone (NH)	0	0.00%
Mixed Race or Multi-Racial (NH)	11	11.00%
Hispanic or Latino (any race)	3	3.00%
Total	100	100.00%
