= Webb City, Arkansas =

Coordinates: 35°28′05″N 93°49′55″W

Webb City is an unincorporated community in Franklin County, in the U.S. state of Arkansas.

== History ==
The first permanent settlement at Webb City was made ca. 1840. A post office called Webb City was established in 1875, and remained in operation until 1955.
