= Our Lady of Perpetual Help Church (Altus, Arkansas) =

Historic church in Arkansas, United States

- U.S. National Register of Historic Places
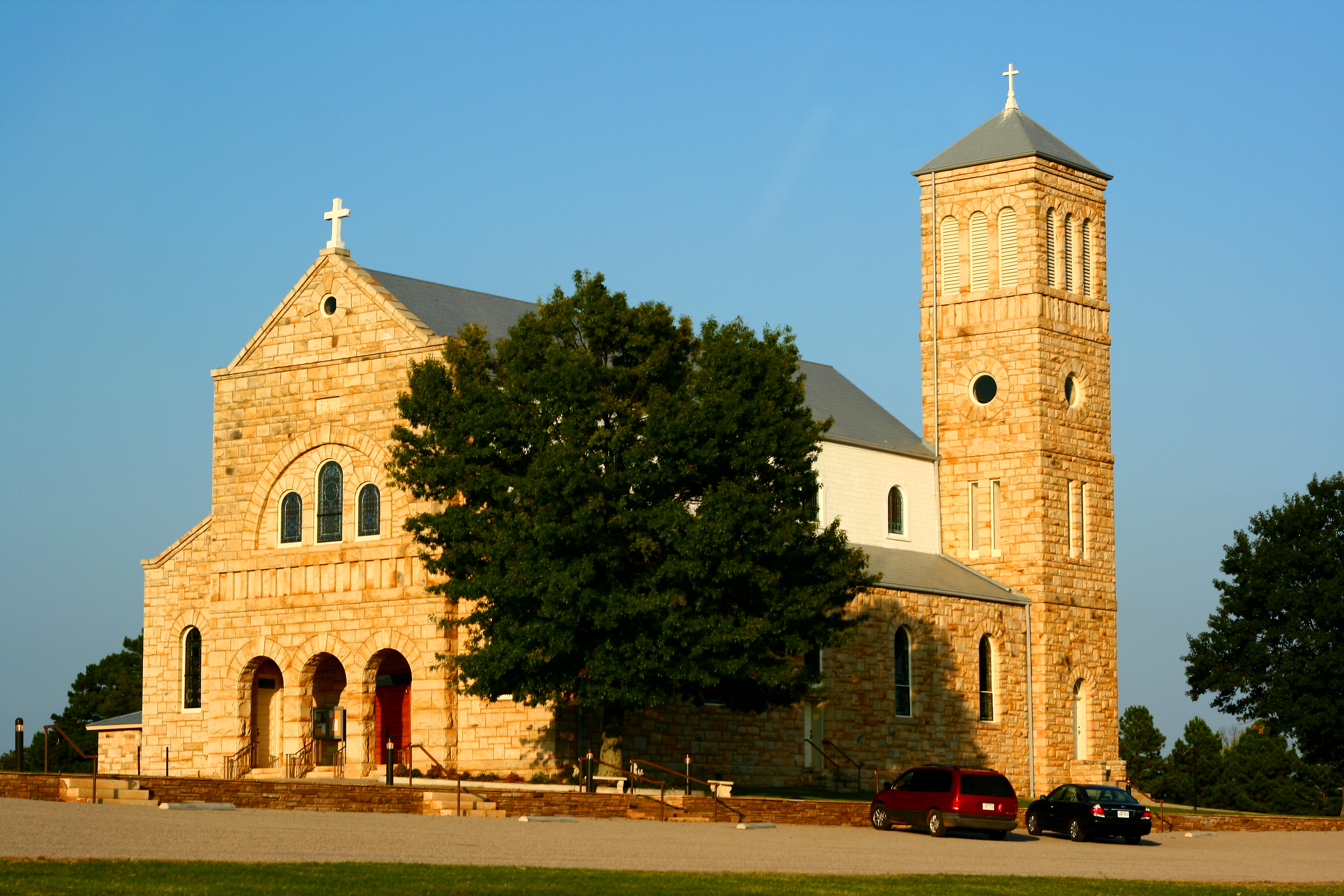

- Location within Arkansas Location within the United States
- Nearest city: Altus, Arkansas
- Coordinates: 35°27′8.33″N 93°45′30.06″W
- Built: 1902
- NRHP reference No.: 76000406
- Added to NRHP: May 3, 1976

Our Lady of Perpetual Help, also known as St. Mary's Catholic Church, is a historic church just north of Altus, Arkansas. It is located on Franklin County Road 521, just outside the city limits. The Romanesque church building was built in 1902. The church is known for its Sistine Chapel-style paintings and grand Roman Basilical architecture. Brown stone blocks cover the outside of the church, and the inside walls are lined with ornate gold leaf. The organ inside the church is over 100 years old, as is the bell tower. The church was listed on the National Register of Historic Places in 1976.

Notable parishioners have included Johann Andreas Wiederkehr.

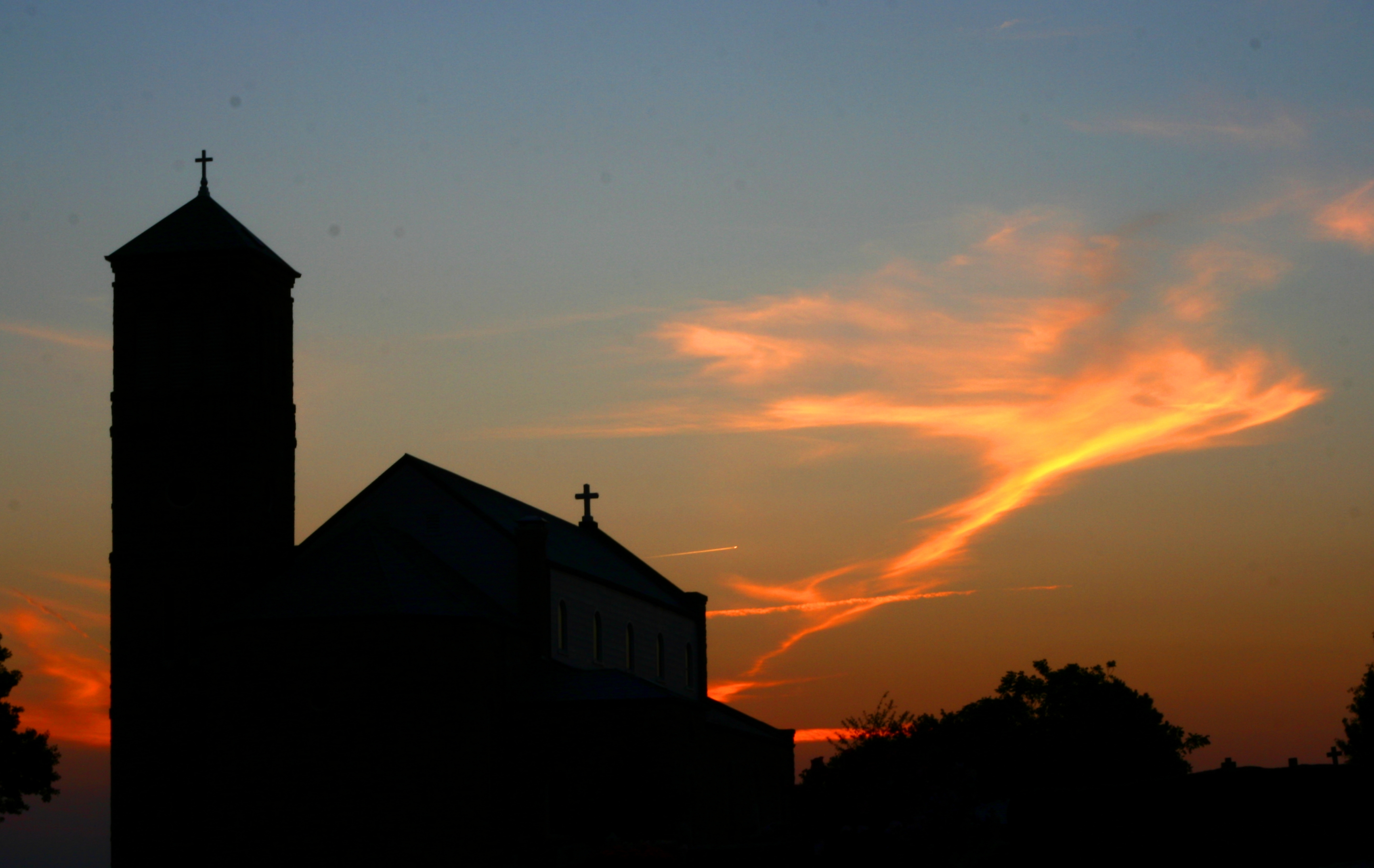
The church silhouetted against the evening sky
