= Janice Holt Giles =

American novelist

Janice Holt Giles (March 28, 1905 – June 1, 1979) was an American writer who lived near Knifley in Adair County, Kentucky.

== Personal life ==
She was born Janice Meredith Holt on March 28, 1905, in Altus, Arkansas to John Albert Holt and Lucy Elizabeth (née McGraw); both her parents were teachers. She had two younger siblings, Mary Catherine Holt Sullivan (July 9, 1907 - January 8, 1995) and John Albert Holt Jr. (January 11, 1910 - February 23, 1974). Janice Holt worked for a number of years with a number of church-affiliated clerical jobs, first in Oklahoma and then in Kentucky, having moved to Frankfort in 1939 subsequent to her divorce that year from her first husband Otto Moore, whom she had wed in 1927. In 1941 Janice Holt obtained a position as secretary at the Louisville Presbyterian Theological Seminary in Louisville, Kentucky.

In 1945 Janice Holt married Henry Giles, who was eleven years her junior. After first becoming acquainted on a 40-hour bus trip in 1943, the couple had subsequently courted via letters to and from Europe, where Henry Giles was serving in the military, and were married the same day Henry returned to the United States. The couple lived in Louisville until 1949, when they took up residence in Adair County within two miles of the area where Henry's ancestors had settled in 1803. They subsequently constructed a house, which took four years to complete, from the logs of four pioneer cabins. They lived there until Janice died of congestive heart failure in 1979. Henry died in 1986 and was buried next to Janice in the Caldwell Chapel Separate Baptist Church cemetery a few miles to the north.

== Writing ==
Giles began her writing career with an entry to a fiction contest in 1949 while still working at the Presbyterian Seminary in Louisville. Between 1950 and 1975 Giles wrote twenty-four books which were published. Noted primarily for her historical novels set in Kentucky - beginning with her debut novel The Enduring Hills - or on the Western frontier, she also wrote contemporary fiction set in the Kentucky hills, as well as autobiographical and nonfiction works, some of them co-authored with Henry. Her works include the Piney Woods trilogy, consisting of The Enduring Hills (1950), Miss Willie (1951), and Tara's Healing (1952), and the Kentucky trilogy, consisting of The Kentuckians (1953), Hannah Fowler (1956), and The Believers (1957). The Janice Holt Giles and Henry Giles Society was established in 1996 to preserve the Giles' literary legacy and to restore their log home.

Giles' historical fiction works form a study of early American pioneer life in Virginia, Tennessee, Kentucky, Arkansas, Oklahoma, Texas, and New Mexico among other states. Her accounts are accurate geographically and historically, and are tied together by the fictitious Cooper, Fowler, and Cartwright families. Real historical figures from Giles' novels include Ben Logan, Daniel Boone, James Harrod, William Whitley, James Wilkinson, Gen. Matthew Arbuckle, and Sam Houston. She also provides a realistic historical perspective of the relationships among Native Americans, White settlers, and African Americans. One can gain a solid understanding of the early process of national (United States) expansion by reading the listed volumes in the following order.

== Books ==
(approximate period covered; primary geographical settings)

- The Kentuckians (1775–1778; VA, KY, TN)
- Hannah Fowler (1778–1781; KY, TN, OH)
- The Land Beyond the Mountains (1781–1792; KY, PA, IN)
- The Believers (1795–1805; KY)
- Johnny Osage (1821; OK, AR)
- The Voyage to Santa Fe (1823; OK, TX, NM)
- Savanna (1829–1834; OK, AR)
- The Great Adventure (1834; CO, NM,)
- Run Me a River (September 1861; KY, IN)
- Six Horse Hitch (1859–1869; NE, CO).
- The Damned Engineers (1944; Europe)
