= Wiederkehr Village, Arkansas =

- City
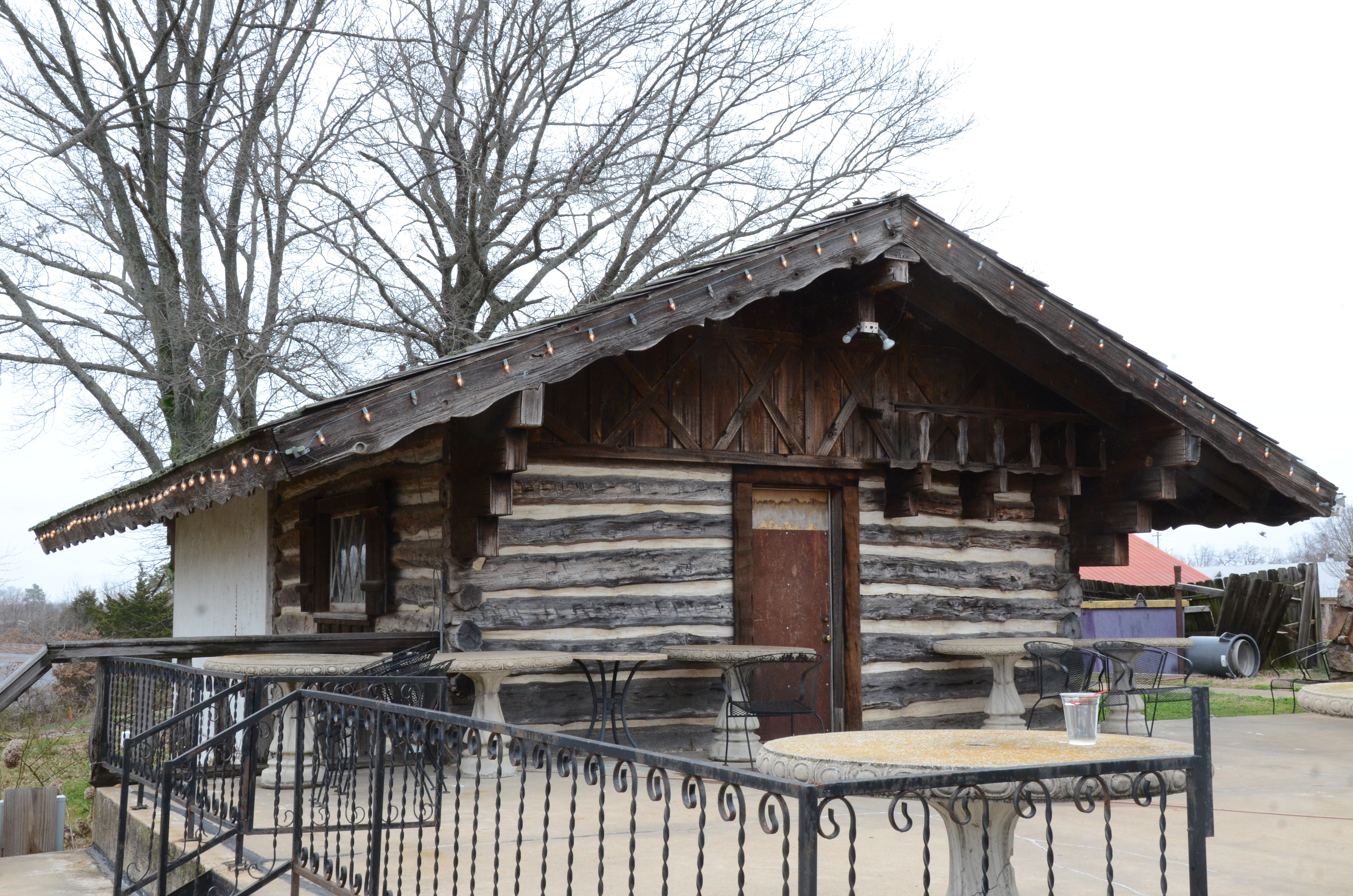
- Wiederkehr Wine Cellar, 1979

- Location of Wiederkehr Village in Franklin County, Arkansas.
- Coordinates: 35°28′54″N 93°45′27″W
- Country: United States
- State: Arkansas
- County: Franklin
- Named for: Johann Andreas Wiederkehr

Government
  - Mayor: Jeff Coley

Area
  - Total: 4.29 sq mi (11.11 km^{2})
  - Land: 4.24 sq mi (10.98 km^{2})
  - Water: 0.050 sq mi (0.13 km^{2})
- Elevation: 761 ft (232 m)

Population (2020)
  - Total: 50
  - Estimate (2025): 39 ▼
  - Density: 11.8/sq mi (4.55/km^{2})
- Time zone: UTC-6 (Central (CST))
  - Summer (DST): UTC-5 (CDT)
- ZIP code: 72821
- Area code: 479
- FIPS code: 05-75570
- GNIS feature ID: 2405741

Wiederkehr Village is a city in Franklin County, Arkansas, United States. As of the 2020 census, Wiederkehr Village had a population of 50. It is named after Swiss winemaker Johann Andreas Wiederkehr, who immigrated to the area in 1880.

== Geography ==
Wiederkehr Village is located in eastern Franklin County, north of Altus and 4 miles (6 km) east of Ozark.

According to the United States Census Bureau, the city has a total area of 4.0 square miles (10.4 km^{2}), of which 4.0 square miles (10.3 km^{2}) is land and 0.04 square miles (0.1 km^{2}), or 1.15%, is water.

== Demographics ==
Historical population
Census	Pop.	Note	%±
1980	71		—
1990	42		−40.8%
2000	46		9.5%
2010	38		−17.4%
2020	50		31.6%
2025 (est.)	39	▼	−22.0%
U.S. Decennial Census

As of the census of 2000, there were 46 people, 24 households, and 13 families residing in the city. The population density was 11.3 people per square mile (4.4 people/km^{2}). There were 27 housing units at an average density of 6.6 per square mile (2.5/km^{2}). The racial makeup of the city was 95.65% White, 2.17% Native American and 2.17% Asian.

There were 24 households, out of which 16.7% had children under the age of 18 living with them, 41.7% were married couples living together, 4.2% had a female householder with no husband present, and 45.8% were non-families. 37.5% of all households were made up of individuals, and 29.2% had someone living alone who was 65 years of age or older. The average household size was 1.92 and the average family size was 2.54.

In the city, the population was spread out, with 15.2% under the age of 18, 19.6% from 18 to 24, 17.4% from 25 to 44, 26.1% from 45 to 64, and 21.7% who were 65 years of age or older. The median age was 40 years. For every 100 females, there were 155.6 males. For every 100 females age 18 and over, there were 143.8 males.

The median income for a household in the city was $33,750, and the median income for a family was $43,125. Males had a median income of $28,750 versus $13,750 for females. The per capita income for the city was $20,718. There were 15.4% of families and 23.7% of the population living below the poverty line, including 71.4% of under eighteens and none of those over 64.
