= Franklin County, Arkansas =

County in Arkansas, United States

- County
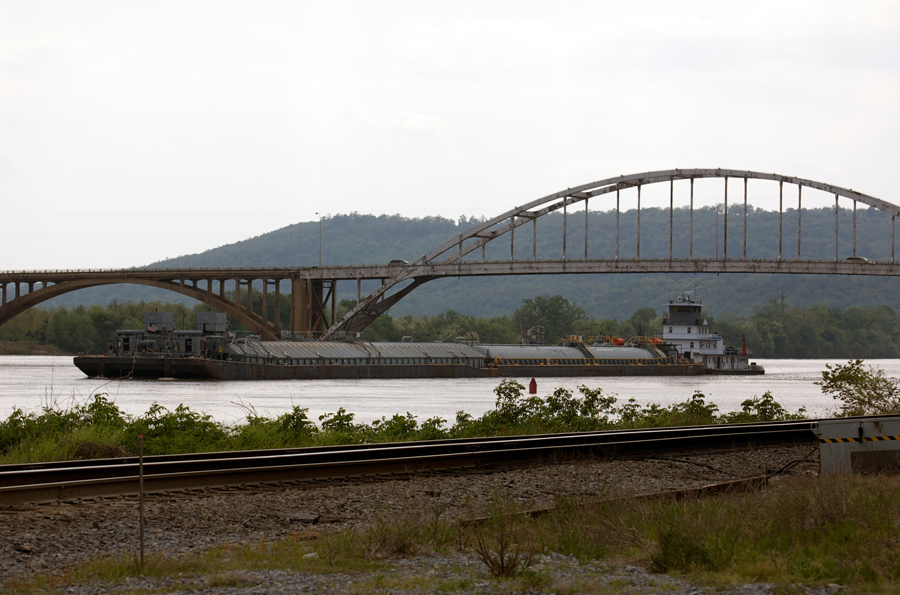
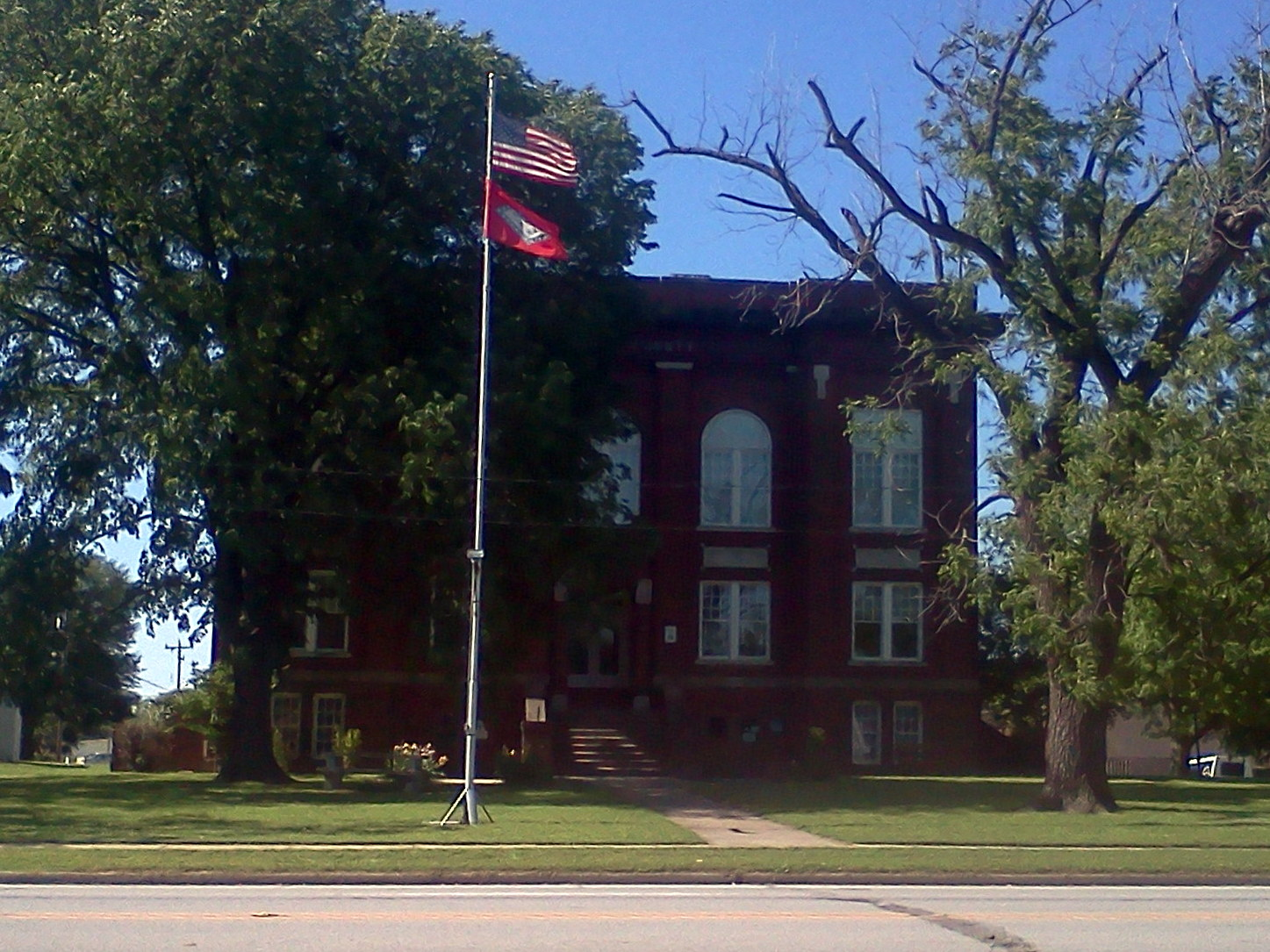
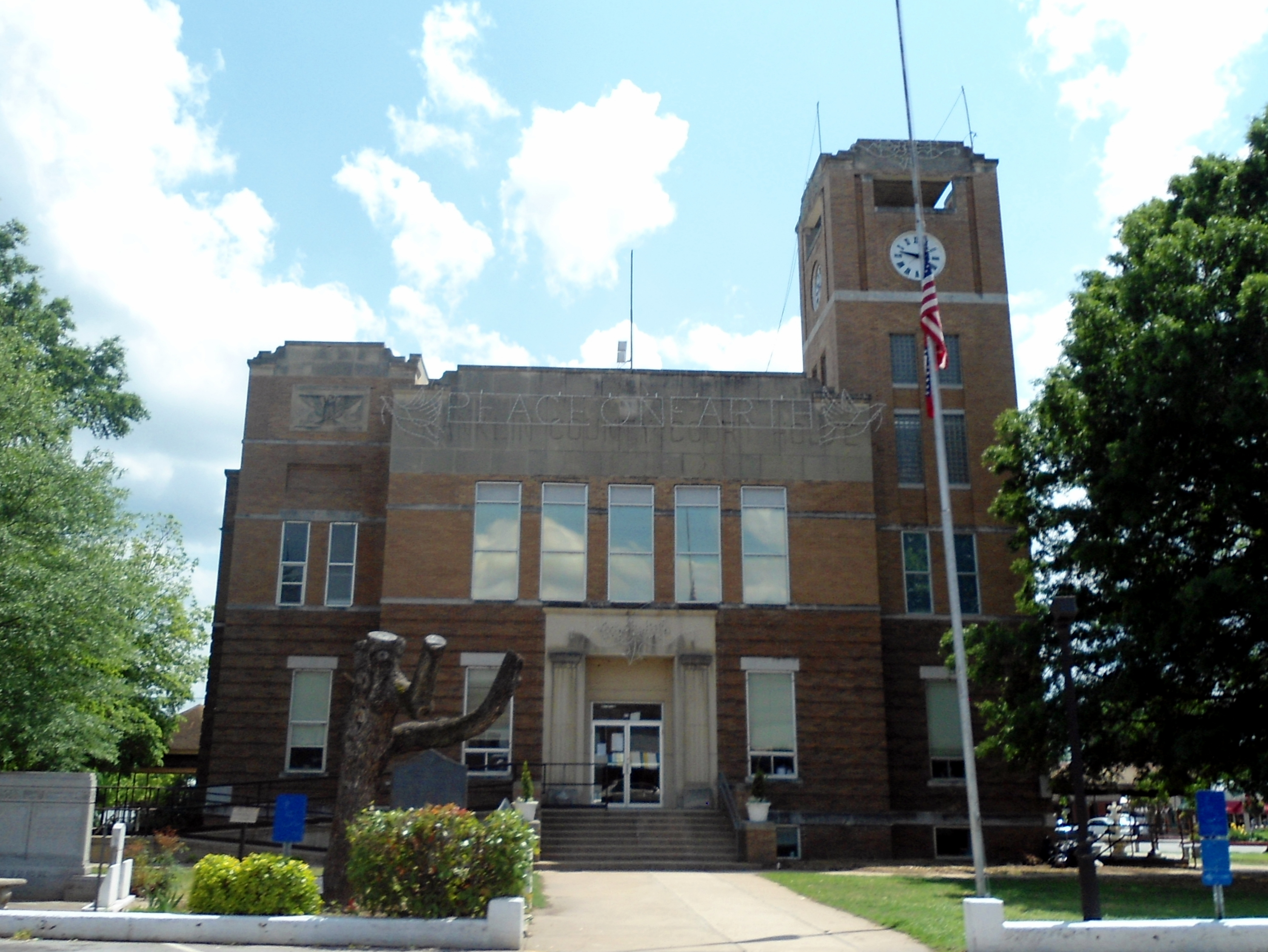
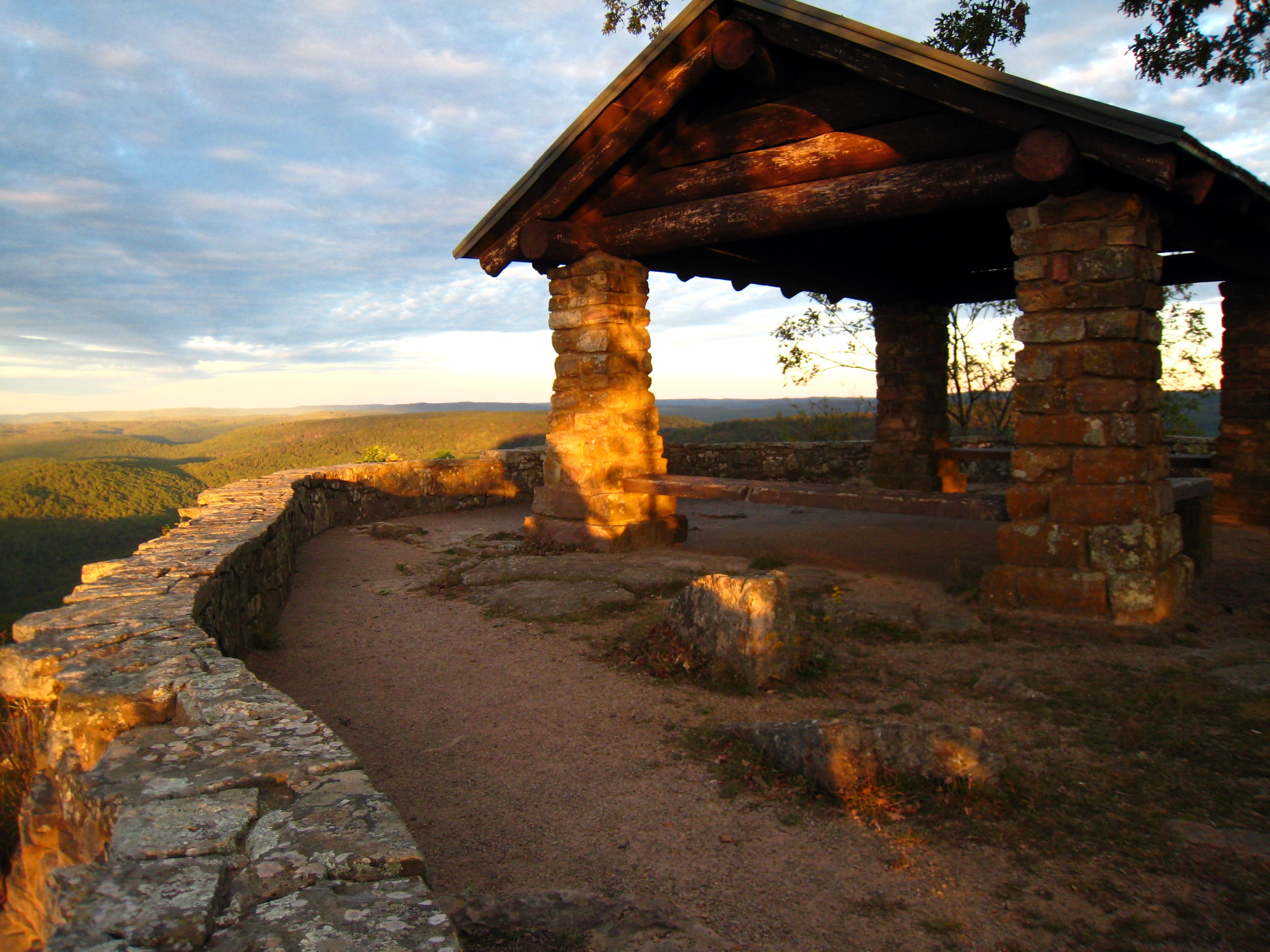
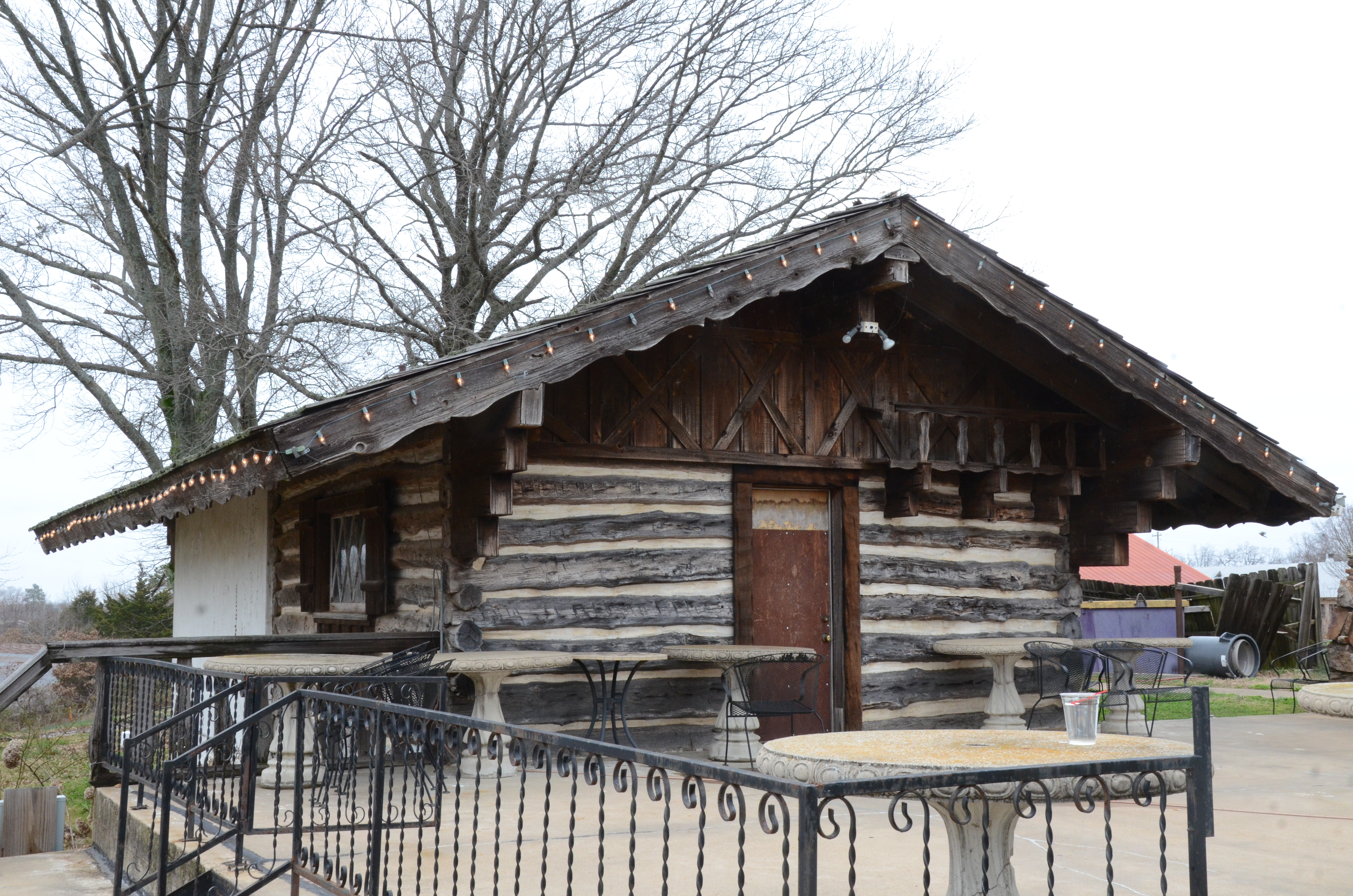
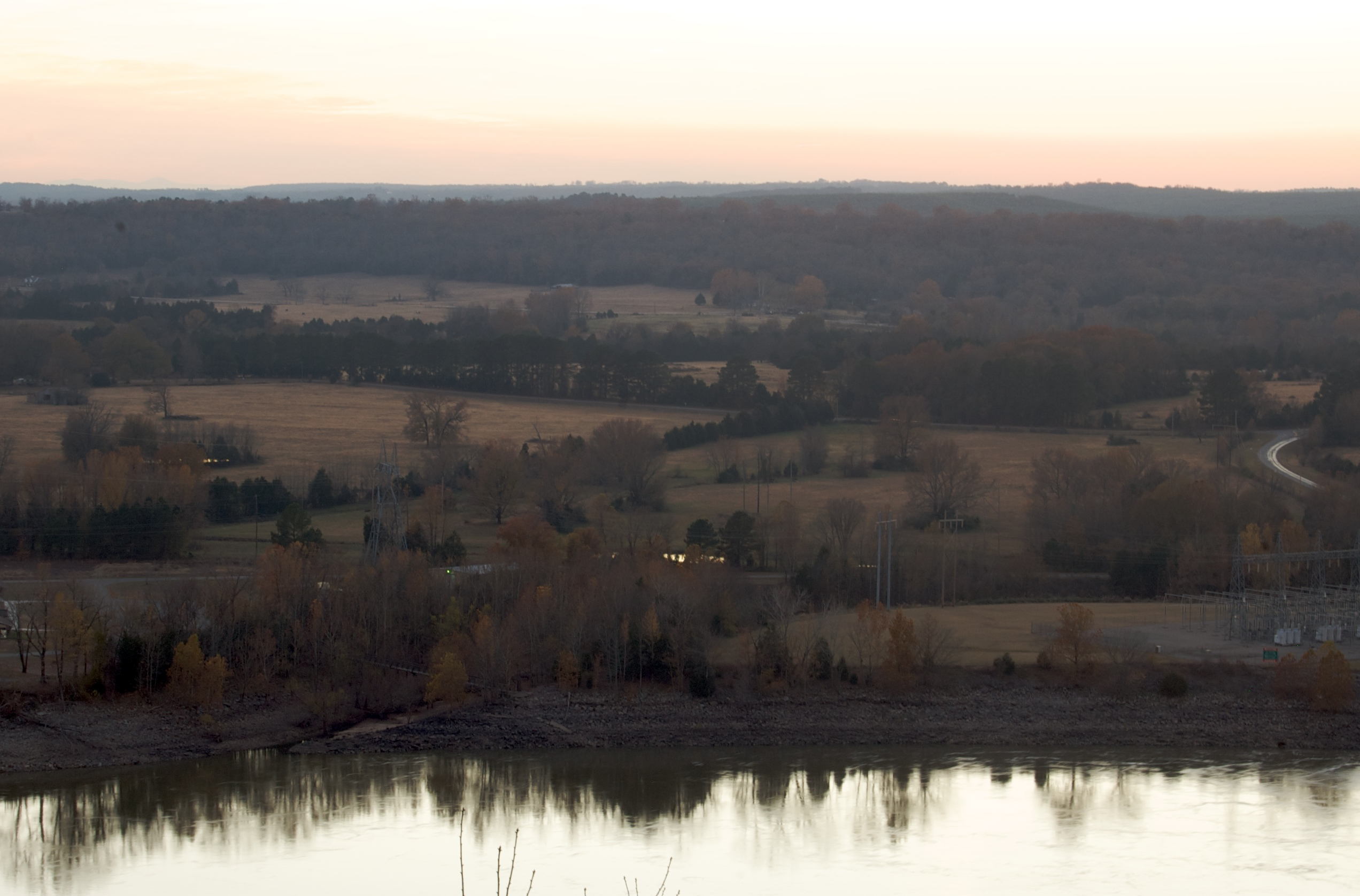
- Clockwise from top: The Ozark Bridge over the Arkansas River, Franklin County Courthouse in Ozark, the Wiederkehr Wine Cellar near Altus, Sunset from Reed Mountain overlooking the Arkansas River Valley, Overlook at White Rock Mountain in the Ozark National Forest, Franklin County Courthouse in Charleston

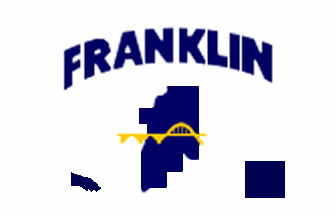
- Flag Seal

- Location within the U.S. state of Arkansas
- Coordinates: 35°31′15″N 93°52′33″W
- Country: United States
- State: Arkansas
- Founded: December 19, 1837
- Named for: Benjamin Franklin
- Seat: Ozark (northern district); Charleston (southern district)
- Largest city: Ozark

Area
  - Total: 620 sq mi (1,600 km^{2})
  - Land: 609 sq mi (1,580 km^{2})
  - Water: 11 sq mi (28 km^{2}) 1.7%

Population (2020)
  - Total: 17,097
  - Estimate (2025): 17,725 ▲
  - Density: 28.1/sq mi (10.8/km^{2})
- Time zone: UTC−6 (Central)
  - Summer (DST): UTC−5 (CDT)
- Congressional district: 4th
- Website: https://www.arcounties.org/counties/franklin/

Franklin County is a county in Arkansas. As of the 2020 census, the population was 17,097. The county has two county seats, Charleston and Ozark. The county was formed on December 19, 1837, and named for Benjamin Franklin, American statesman. Franklin County is a damp county, with alcohol sales allowed except in Alix township, and limits on liquor sales in the city of Branch.

== History ==
Franklin County was carved out of Crawford County in December 1837. At that time, Franklin was significantly larger than it is at present, encompassing part of present-day Logan County which was formed in 1871.

Initially, the county had a single courthouse at Ozark. To promote economic growth in the county, federal land grants were made in 1853 to incentivize the construction and operation of the Little Rock and Fort Smith Railroad. From receivership in 1875 after a railroad debt crisis, it was reorganized as the Little Rock and Fort Smith Railway. A number of towns were established in the 1890s on the north bank of the river along its right of way. Many farmers purchased land that had been owned by the railway. After complaints about how difficult it was to cross the river at times, a second courthouse was established at Charleston for citizens in the settlements south of the river, sometime in the 1890s, probably after 1892 since "Charleston" did not appear in an 1893 railroad map in all capital letters as "OZARK" did. In 1906 the railway was acquired by the St. Louis, Iron Mountain and Southern Railway. In 1917 the line became a backbone of the MoPac, which merged into the Union Pacific Railroad in 1982.

The reality television show, The Simple Life, starring Nicole Richie and Paris Hilton was filmed in Altus in 2003.

In 2026, Arkansas Governor Sarah Huckabee Sanders sought to build a 3,000-bed prison in the county. Franklin County residents opposed this.

== Geography ==
According to the U.S. Census Bureau, the county has a total area of 620 square miles (1,600 km^{2}), of which 609 square miles (1,580 km^{2}) is land and 11 square miles (28 km^{2}) (1.7%) is water.

=== Major highways ===
- Interstate 40
- U.S. Highway 64
- Highway 22
- Highway 23
- Highway 41
- Highway 60
- Highway 96
- Highway 179
- Highway 186
- Highway 215
- Highway 217
- Highway 219
- Highway 288
- Highway 309
- Highway 352
- Highway 398

=== Adjacent counties ===
- Madison County (north)
- Johnson County (east)
- Logan County (southeast)
- Sebastian County (southwest)
- Crawford County (west)

=== Protected areas ===
- Lake Dardanelle State Park (part)
- Ozark National Forest (part)
- White Rock Wildlife Management Area (part)

== Demographics ==
Historical population
Census	Pop.	Note	%±
1840	2,665		—
1850	3,972		49.0%
1860	7,298		83.7%
1870	9,627		31.9%
1880	14,951		55.3%
1890	19,934		33.3%
1900	17,395		−12.7%
1910	20,638		18.6%
1920	19,364		−6.2%
1930	15,762		−18.6%
1940	15,683		−0.5%
1950	12,358		−21.2%
1960	10,213		−17.4%
1970	11,301		10.7%
1980	14,705		30.1%
1990	14,897		1.3%
2000	17,771		19.3%
2010	18,125		2.0%
2020	17,097		−5.7%
2025 (est.)	17,725	▲	3.7%
U.S. Decennial Census; 1790–1960 1900–1990; 1990–2000 2010

=== 2020 census ===
As of the 2020 census, the county had a population of 17,097. The median age was 41.7 years. 24.0% of residents were under the age of 18 and 20.0% of residents were 65 years of age or older. For every 100 females there were 99.4 males, and for every 100 females age 18 and over there were 95.3 males age 18 and over.

The racial makeup of the county was 89.9% White, 0.5% Black or African American, 1.3% American Indian and Alaska Native, 1.0% Asian, 0.1% Native Hawaiian and Pacific Islander, 1.1% from some other race, and 6.3% from two or more races. Hispanic or Latino residents of any race comprised 2.9% of the population.

<0.1% of residents lived in urban areas, while 100.0% lived in rural areas.

There were 6,706 households in the county, of which 31.4% had children under the age of 18 living in them. Of all households, 51.6% were married-couple households, 17.5% were households with a male householder and no spouse or partner present, and 24.2% were households with a female householder and no spouse or partner present. About 25.8% of all households were made up of individuals and 13.4% had someone living alone who was 65 years of age or older.

There were 7,716 housing units, of which 13.1% were vacant. Among occupied housing units, 75.0% were owner-occupied and 25.0% were renter-occupied. The homeowner vacancy rate was 1.5% and the rental vacancy rate was 8.2%.

=== 2000 census ===
As of the 2000 census, there were 17,771 people, 6,882 households, and 4,961 families residing in the county. The population density was 29 inhabitants per square mile (11/km^{2}). There were 7,673 housing units at an average density of 13 per square mile (5.0/km^{2}). The racial makeup of the county was 96.17% White, 0.62% Black or African American, 0.80% Native American, 0.26% Asian, 0.06% Pacific Islander, 0.74% from other races, and 1.35% from two or more races. 1.74% of the population were Hispanic or Latino of any race.

There were 6,882 households, out of which 32.40% had children under the age of 18 living with them, 59.20% were married couples living together, 8.80% had a female householder with no husband present, and 27.90% were non-families. 24.60% of all households were made up of individuals, and 12.40% had someone living alone who was 65 years of age or older. The average household size was 2.51 and the average family size was 2.99.

In the county, the population was spread out, with 25.80% under the age of 18, 8.50% from 18 to 24, 26.70% from 25 to 44, 23.20% from 45 to 64, and 15.80% who were 65 years of age or older. The median age was 38 years. For every 100 females, there were 98.00 males. For every 100 females age 18 and over, there were 95.80 males.

The median income for a household in the county was $30,848, and the median income for a family was $36,189. Males had a median income of $27,907 versus $18,822 for females. The per capita income for the county was $14,616. About 10.60% of families and 15.20% of the population were below the poverty line, including 16.20% of those under age 18 and 15.70% of those age 65 or over.

== Government ==
=== Government ===
The county government is a constitutional body granted specific powers by the Constitution of Arkansas and the Arkansas Code. The quorum court is the legislative branch of the county government and controls all spending and revenue collection. Representatives are called justices of the peace and are elected from county districts every even-numbered year. The number of districts in a county vary from nine to fifteen, and district boundaries are drawn by the county election commission. The Franklin County Quorum Court has nine members. Presiding over quorum court meetings is the county judge, who serves as the chief operating officer of the county. The county judge is elected at-large and does not vote in quorum court business, although capable of vetoing quorum court decisions.

Franklin County, Arkansas Elected countywide officials
Position	Officeholder	Party
County Judge	Rickey Bowman	Republican
County Clerk	Tammy Sisson	Republican
Circuit Clerk	Janice King	Republican
Sheriff	Johnny Crocker	Republican
Treasurer	Shelly Wilson	Democratic
Collector	Margaret Hamilton	Republican
Assessor	Rose McKinnon	Republican
Coroner	Casey White	Democratic

The composition of the Quorum Court following the 2024 elections is 6 Republicans, 1 Democrat, and 1 Independent. Justices of the Peace (members) of the Quorum Court following the elections are:

- District 1: Roy Day (R)
- District 2: Freddy Ree (D)
- District 3: David L. Bowles Sr. (R)
- District 4: Vacant
- District 5: Dennis Fisher (R)
- District 6: Brian Lachowski (R)
- District 7: Gary O'Neal (R)
- District 8: Luke Verkamp (R)
- District 9: Lacey Neissl Clark (I)

Additionally, the townships of Franklin County are entitled to elect their own respective constables, as set forth by the Constitution of Arkansas. Constables are largely of historical significance as they were used to keep the peace in rural areas when travel was more difficult. The township constables as of the 2024 elections are:

- Boston: Doug L. Gilliam (I)
- Hogan: H.R. Holloway (R)
- Mill Creek: Wesley Ryan Keeton (I)
- Mountain: Greg Beard (R)
- Prairie: Brandon Hendrix (R)
- White Oak: Orla Larsen (R)
- Wittich: Timothy O'Neal (R)

=== Politics ===
Over the past few election cycles, Franklin County has trended heavily towards the Republican Party. The last Democrat (as of 2024) to carry this county was Arkansas native Bill Clinton in 1996.

In the 2026 gubernatorial election, Libertarian Colt Shelby won a plurality of the vote in Frankin, becoming the first third-party candidate to do so in any Arkansan county since 1896.

United States presidential election results for Franklin County, Arkansas
Year	Republican		Democratic		Third party(ies)	
Year	No.	%	No.	%	No.	%
1896	424	18.99%	1,746	78.19%	63	2.82%
1900	485	25.74%	1,367	72.56%	32	1.70%
1904	593	34.94%	968	57.04%	136	8.01%
1908	565	27.40%	1,311	63.58%	186	9.02%
1912	258	14.75%	1,113	63.64%	378	21.61%
1916	582	25.74%	1,679	74.26%	0	0.00%
1920	769	32.15%	1,502	62.79%	121	5.06%
1924	422	23.05%	1,188	64.88%	221	12.07%
1928	774	36.53%	1,329	62.72%	16	0.76%
1932	275	12.30%	1,896	84.83%	64	2.86%
1936	345	15.35%	1,890	84.11%	12	0.53%
1940	319	16.60%	1,601	83.30%	2	0.10%
1944	457	27.75%	1,188	72.13%	2	0.12%
1948	391	18.69%	1,591	76.05%	110	5.26%
1952	1,215	40.74%	1,762	59.09%	5	0.17%
1956	1,137	41.03%	1,614	58.25%	20	0.72%
1960	1,631	43.48%	2,025	53.99%	95	2.53%
1964	1,580	36.76%	2,685	62.47%	33	0.77%
1968	1,333	29.02%	1,149	25.02%	2,111	45.96%
1972	3,678	74.60%	1,252	25.40%	0	0.00%
1976	1,973	34.76%	3,703	65.24%	0	0.00%
1980	3,448	53.66%	2,716	42.27%	262	4.08%
1984	4,382	64.04%	2,399	35.06%	62	0.91%
1988	3,588	58.93%	2,458	40.37%	43	0.71%
1992	2,495	37.04%	3,217	47.76%	1,024	15.20%
1996	2,246	36.30%	3,269	52.83%	673	10.88%
2000	3,277	53.37%	2,674	43.55%	189	3.08%
2004	4,181	57.36%	3,008	41.27%	100	1.37%
2008	4,411	68.12%	1,869	28.86%	195	3.01%
2012	4,631	70.81%	1,726	26.39%	183	2.80%
2016	5,039	74.43%	1,376	20.32%	355	5.24%
2020	5,677	79.63%	1,300	18.24%	152	2.13%
2024	5,582	80.07%	1,232	17.67%	157	2.25%

== Communities ==
=== Cities ===
- Altus
- Branch
- Charleston (county seat)
- Ozark (county seat)
- Wiederkehr Village

=== Town ===
- Denning

=== Census-designated place ===
- Alix

=== Unincorporated communities ===
- Cecil
- Peanut

=== Ghost towns ===
- Sub Rosa

=== Townships ===
Townships in Arkansas are the divisions of a county. Each township includes unincorporated areas; some may have incorporated cities or towns within part of their boundaries. Arkansas townships have limited purposes in modern times. However, the United States census does list Arkansas population based on townships (sometimes referred to as "county subdivisions" or "minor civil divisions"). Townships are also of value for historical purposes in terms of genealogical research. Each town or city is within one or more townships in an Arkansas county based on census maps and publications. The townships of Franklin County are listed below; listed in parentheses are the cities, towns, and/or census-designated places that are fully or partially inside the township.

- Alix (part of Wiederkehr Village)
- Barham
- Black Oak
- Boston
- Cobb
- Cravens
- Donald (most of Branch)
- Grover
- Hogan (Altus, Denning, part of Wiederkehr Village)
- Hurricane
- Ivy
- Limestone
- McIlroy
- Middle
- Mill Creek
- Miller
- Morgan
- Mountain
- Mulberry
- Prairie (Charleston, small part of Branch)
- Shores
- Six Mile
- Walker
- Wallace
- Watalula
- Weaver
- White Oak (Ozark, most of Wiederkehr Village)
- White Rock
- Wittich

== Education ==
School districts include:

- Charleston School District
- County Line School District
- Huntsville School District
- Jasper School District
- Mulberry School District
- Ozark School District

== See also ==
- List of lakes in Franklin County, Arkansas
- National Register of Historic Places listings in Franklin County, Arkansas
- Gary Stubblefield
