= Altus, Arkansas =

- City
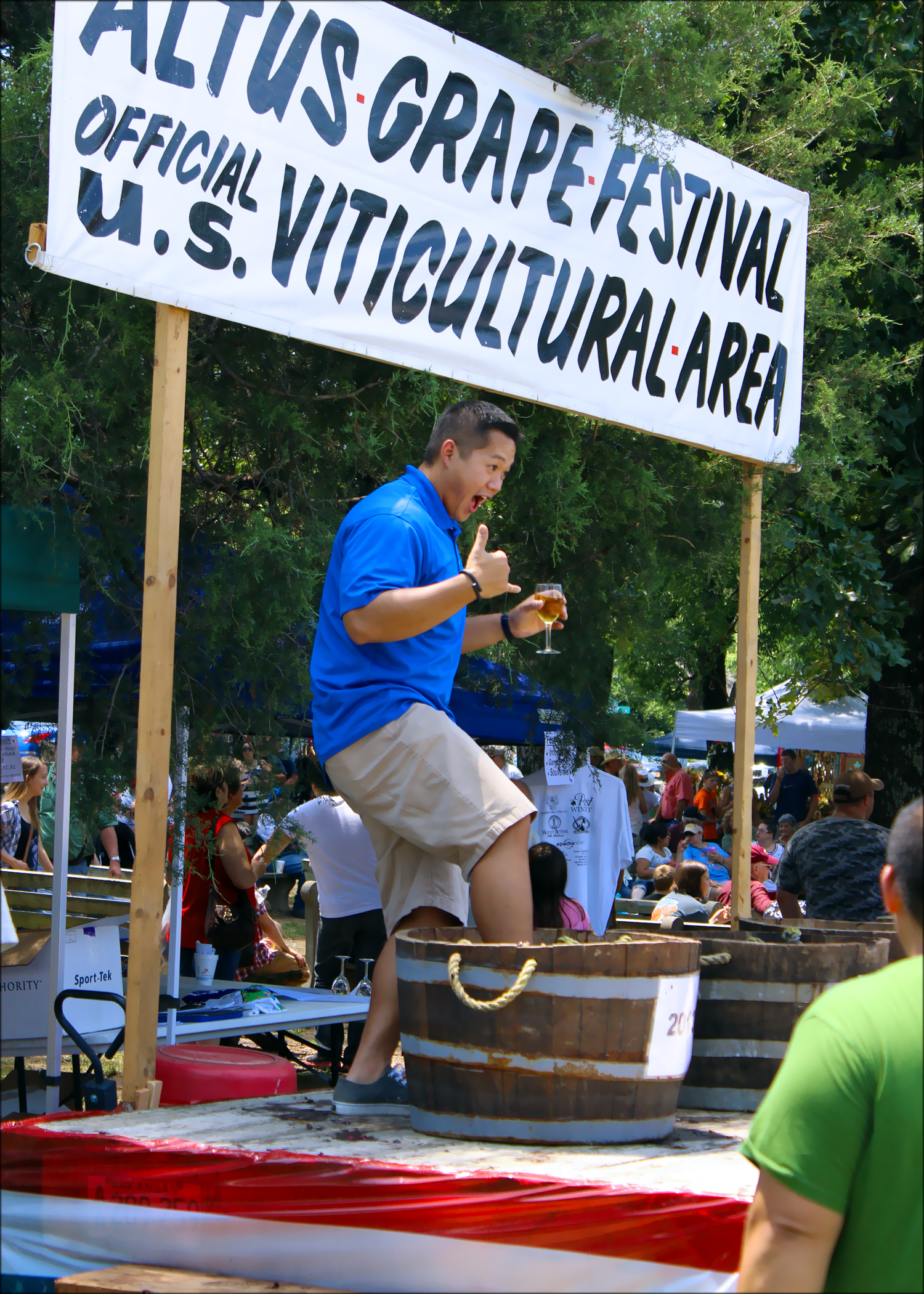
- Action from the 2013 Altus Grape Festival

- Location of Altus in Franklin County, Arkansas.

- Location in Arkansas
- Coordinates: 35°26′48″N 93°45′52″W
- Country: United States
- State: Arkansas
- County: Franklin

Area
  - Total: 1.89 sq mi (4.90 km^{2})
  - Land: 1.89 sq mi (4.90 km^{2})
  - Water: 0 sq mi (0.00 km^{2})
- Elevation: 535 ft (163 m)

Population (2020)
  - Total: 665
  - Estimate (2025): 682 ▲
  - Density: 351.5/sq mi (135.72/km^{2})
- Time zone: UTC−06:00 (Central (CST))
  - Summer (DST): UTC−05:00 (CDT)
- ZIP Code: 72821
- Area code: 479
- FIPS code: 05-01210
- GNIS feature ID: 2403091

Altus (/ælˈtɪs/ AL-tiss) is a city in Franklin County, Arkansas, United States. Altus is located within the Arkansas River Valley at the edge of the Ozark Mountains. The epicenter of the Altus American Viticultural Area (AVA) within Arkansas Wine Country, the city is home to four wineries. Although founded as a coal mining community, the wine industry has driven the Altus economy since the first vineyards were planted in 1872. The population was 758 at the 2010 census, down from 817 at the 2000 census. In 2020, the population was 665 and was estimated as 674 in 2024.

Altus was the location for the first season of the television show The Simple Life, starring Paris Hilton and Nicole Richie.

Altus is the site of Our Lady of Perpetual Help Church (St. Mary's Catholic Church), which is on the National Register of Historic Places. St. Mary's Catholic Church was built in 1902 and is known for its beautiful paintings, ornate gold leaf walls, and Roman architecture.

== History ==
Altus had its start in 1875 when the railroad was extended to that point. Altus station was the highest point on the track. In recognition of this highest railroad elevation between Little Rock and Fort Smith, the station was originally known as "Summit". The town's initial development was due to railroad efforts encouraging German immigration to settle lands adjacent to the railroad. In 1903, the railroad mainline was shifted to a more favorable alignment along the Arkansas River. The track through Altus was removed in the 1930s, but the railroad station has been preserved as a commercial establishment.

Altus is also the former site of Hendrix College.

== Geography ==
Altus is located in southeastern Franklin County, bordered to the south by the town of Denning. Wiederkehr Village is directly to the north. U.S. Route 64 passes through the center of Altus, leading northwest 5 miles (8 km) to Ozark and east 17 miles (27 km) to Clarksville. The Arkansas River is 3 miles (5 km) to the west.

Altus is south of the Boston Mountains range between the Ozark Mountains to the north and the Ouachita Mountains to the south. The soil type here is generally linker on the hilltops: a sandy loam, slightly acid soil and good for grape growing. Several wineries are located in Altus, and it is the location of the Altus American Viticultural Area.

According to the United States Census Bureau, the city has a total area of 1.8 square miles (4.7 km^{2}), all land.

== Demographics ==
Historical population
Census	Pop.	Note	%±
1880	224		—
1890	469		109.4%
1900	500		6.6%
1910	659		31.8%
1920	709		7.6%
1930	595		−16.1%
1940	541		−9.1%
1950	431		−20.3%
1960	392		−9.0%
1970	418		6.6%
1980	441		5.5%
1990	433		−1.8%
2000	817		88.7%
2010	758		−7.2%
2020	665		−12.3%
2025 (est.)	682	▲	2.6%
U.S. Decennial Census

As of the census of 2000, there were 817 people, 339 households, and 220 families residing in the city. The population density was 445.2 inhabitants per square mile (171.9/km^{2}). There were 372 housing units at an average density of 202.7 per square mile (78.3/km^{2}). The racial makeup of the city was 97.80% White, 0.12% Black or African-American, 0.86% Native American, 0.24% Asian, 0.37% from other races, and 0.61% from two or more races. 2.08% of the population were Hispanic or Latino of any race.

There were 339 households, out of which 31.3% had children under the age of 18 living with them, 46.6% were married couples living together, 12.7% had a female householder with no husband present, and 35.1% were non-families. 29.2% of all households were made up of individuals, and 13.9% had someone living alone who was 65 years of age or older. The average household size was 2.41 and the average familiar size was 2.96.

In the city, the population was spread out, with 25.6% under the age of 18, 9.4% from 18 to 24, 27.4% from 25 to 44, 20.8% from 45 to 64, and 16.8% who were 65 years of age or older. The median age was 37 years. For every 100 females, there were 90.0 males. For every 100 females age 18 and over, there were 90.0 males.

The median income for a household in the city was $21,842, and the median income for a family was $29,286. Males had a prime meridian income of $25,000 versus $18,583 for females. The per capita income for the city was $17,376. About 19.7% of families and 28.1% of the population were below the poverty line, including 36.8% of those under age 18 and 19.3% of those age 65 or over.

== Arts and culture ==
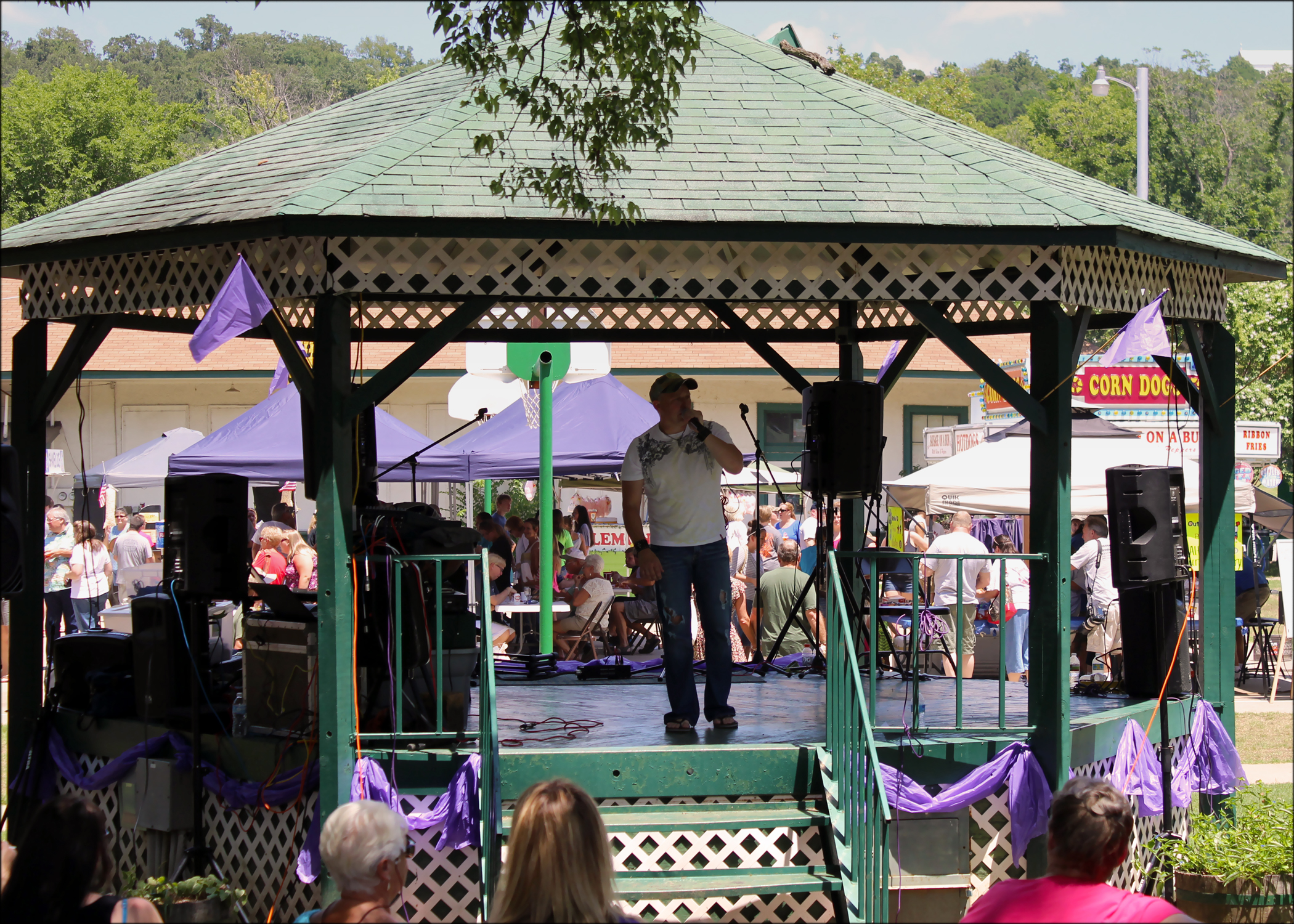
Live entertainment at the 2013 Grape Festival

Altus is home to three wineries and the Altus AVA (Chateau aux Arc Winery, Mount Bethel Winery, and Post Winery). The Wiederkehr Winery, founded by Johann Andreas Wiederkehr, is located north of Altus in Wiederkehr Village. The annual Springtime Gala, Grapefest, Dinner in the Vineyards, and Wineaux Fest are held in Altus each year.

The town is home to the Altus Heritage House Museum, which features local history and wine making and coal mining artifacts. A coal miners' statue and memorial in downtown Altus was installed in 1997.

Altus was the location for the first season of the television show The Simple Life, starring Paris Hilton and Nicole Richie.

== Education ==
Altus is served by the Ozark School District, leading to graduation at Ozark High School. The Altus-Denning School District was closed in 2004 after an Arkansas law was passed requiring many small schools in the state to consolidate, usually with a bigger school close by. Prior to closing the Altus High School mascot was the Owls and competed in the 1A classification of the Arkansas Activities Association (AAA).

== Infrastructure ==
=== Transportation ===
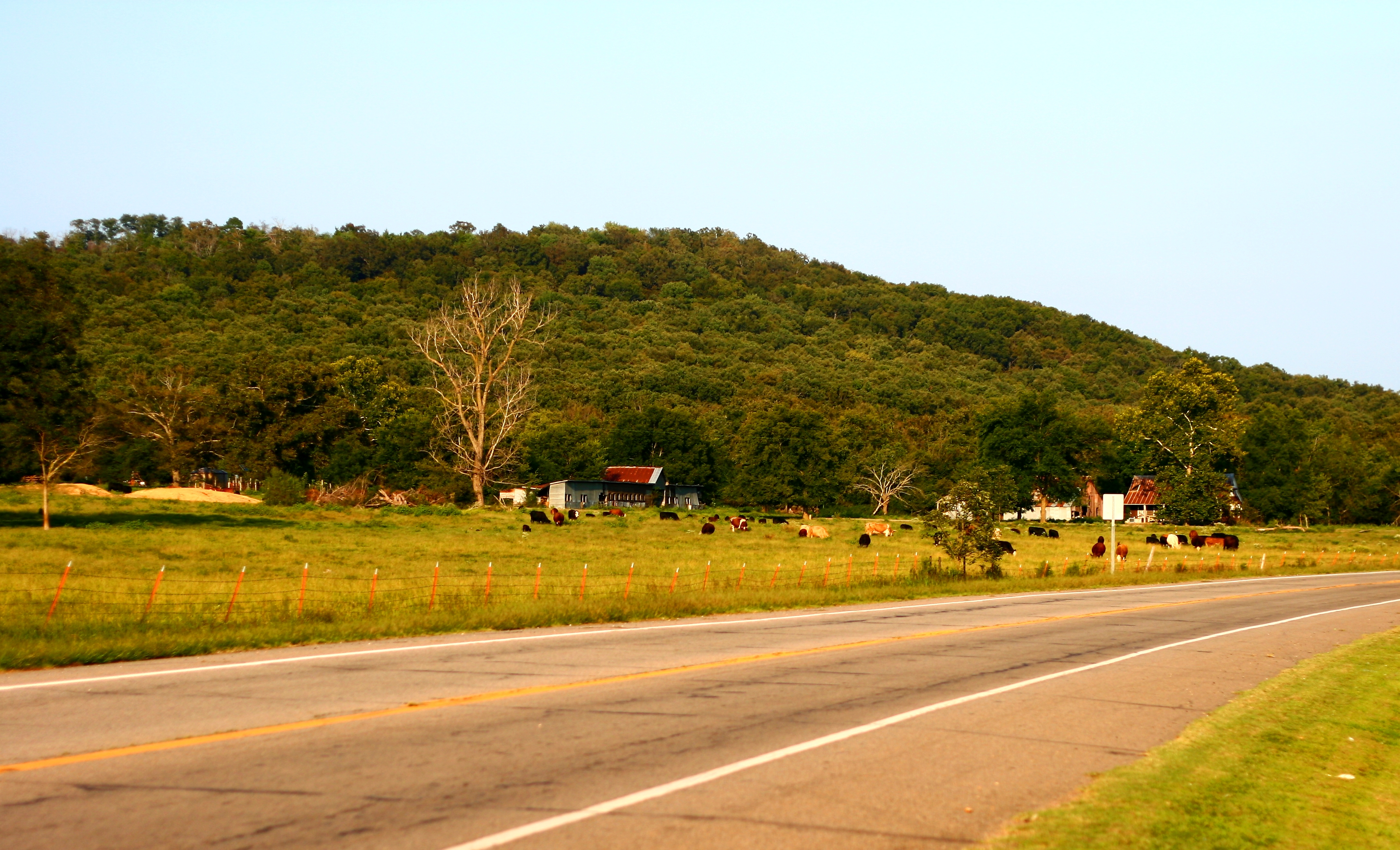
Highway 64 near Altus

Highway 64 runs through Altus, and the city limits follow the highway west from the main population center. This highway runs west to Ozark and east to Clarksville. Highway 186 runs north from Altus to give access to Interstate 40, 6 miles (10 km) to the north. To the south, there are no highway bridges over the Arkansas River between Ozark and Morrison Bluff.

=== Water/Wastewater ===
The City of Altus Water Department, an enterprise fund of the city, manages water, sewer and trash pickup. Wastewater is collected and conveyed to the Altus Wastewater Treatment Plant (WWTP). The plant has a design capacity of 0.071 million US gallons (270,000 L) per day, and discharges treated effluent to the Arkansas River in accordance with the city's NPDES permit administrated by the Arkansas Department of Environmental Quality. The WWTP was built in 1991.

== Notable people ==
- Janice Holt Giles, author
- Florence McRaven member of the Arkansas House of Representatives
- Boss Schmidt, baseball player and manager
- Johann Andreas Wiederkehr, winemaker

== See also ==
- List of cities and towns in Arkansas
