= Arkansas Highway 41 =

State highway in Arkansas, United States

Highway 41

Route information
- Maintained by ArDOT
- Existed: 1926–present

Section 1
- Length: 38.38 mi (61.77 km)
- South end: SH 8 at the Texas state line near Foreman
- North end: US 70B / AR 329 in De Queen

Section 2
- Length: 18.62 mi (29.97 km)
- South end: AR 23 near Chismville
- North end: Citadel Park Road near Cecil

Location
- Country: United States
- State: Arkansas
- Counties: Little River, Sevier, Logan, Franklin

Highway system
- Arkansas Highway System; Interstate; US; State; Business; Spurs; Suffixed; Scenic; Heritage
| ← AR 40 | → I-42 |

Arkansas Highway 41 (AR 41) is a designation for two state highways in west Arkansas. One segment of 38.38 miles (61.77 km) runs from the Texas state line north to U.S. Route 70B (US 70B) in De Queen. A second segment of 18.62 miles (29.97 km) runs from Highway 23 north of Chismville north to Citadel Park Road north of Cecil.

Both routes are maintained by the Arkansas Department of Transportation (ArDOT). A former alignment of Highway 41 existed as Highway 41B, a business route running north to De Queen for twelve years, until it was transferred to city maintenance in 1992.

== Route description ==
=== Texas to De Queen ===
Highway 41 begins at the Red River at the Texas state line as a continuation of Texas State Highway 8 and runs north before a brief concurrency with Highway 32. The two routes run north into Foreman, where the route becomes Madden Street, before meeting Highway 108, where Highway 32 turns west, and Highway 41 continues north. The route has a junction with Highway 234 at Cross Roads, before winding north to cross Highway 380 at Billingslys Corner, and then crossing the Little River. Highway 41 continues northeast into Sevier County before passing the Pond Creek National Wildlife Refuge. The route enters Horatio as Main Street, before forming a concurrency with Highway 24 at William Street. The two routes run northeast, before Highway 24 turns east, and Highway 41 continues north. Highway 41 continues north to the city of De Queen, the county seat of Sevier County, where it terminates at US 70B and Highway 329.

=== Chismville to Cecil ===
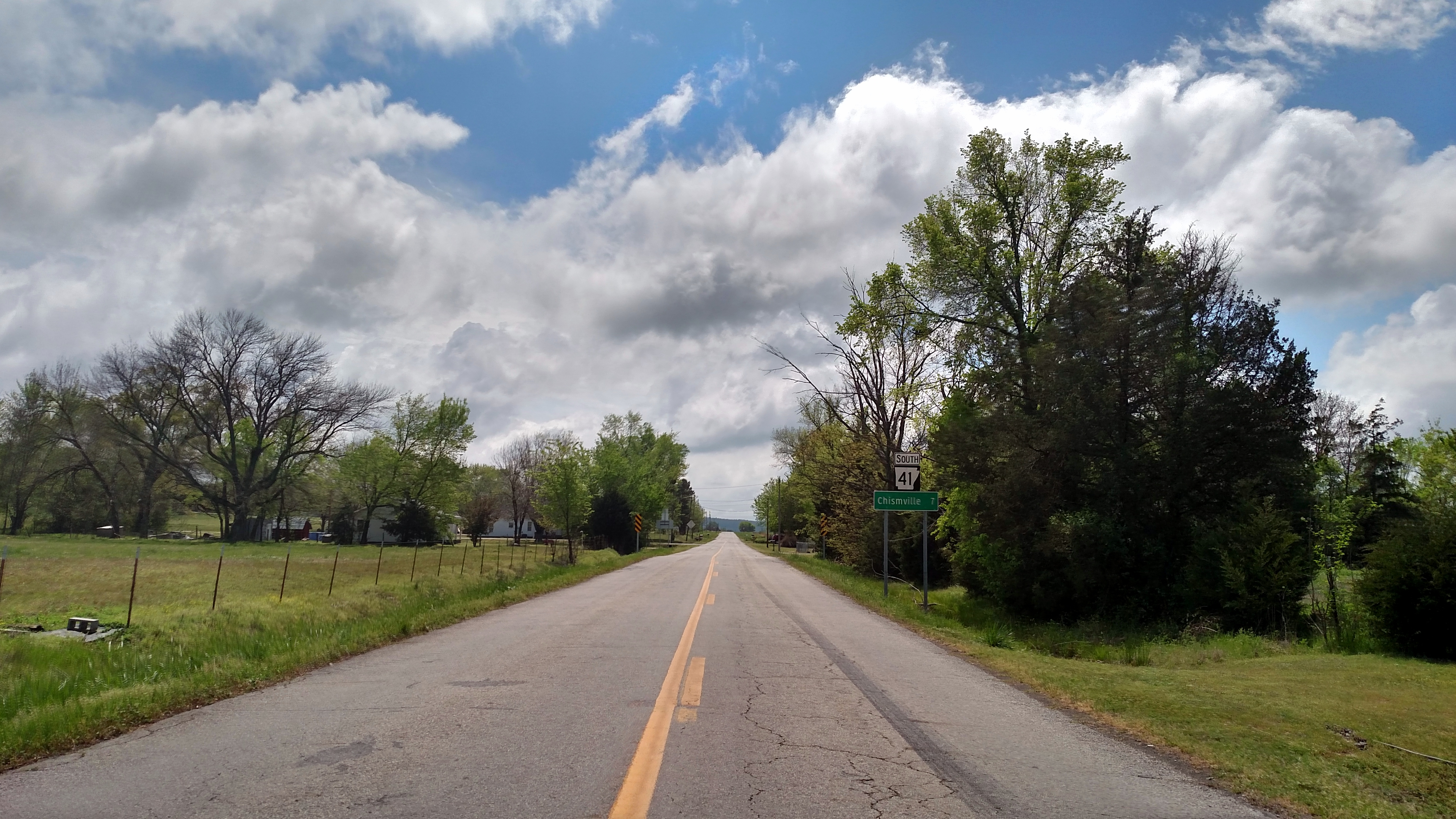
Highway 41 in Branch

The route begins at Highway 23 north of Chismville and runs north into Franklin County. Highway 41 forms concurrency with Highway 22 in Branch and runs east, before turning north and serving as the western terminus for Highway 398. The route continues north to Peter Pender, where it has junctions with Highway 60 and Highway 288. Highway 41 winds further north to a junction with Highway 96 at Cecil, before terminating at Citadel Park Road north of Cecil. Traffic counts from the Arkansas State Highway and Transportation Department (AHTD) reveal that no more than 800 vehicles per day (VPD) used Highway 41 along its routing from Citadel Bluff to Highway 23.

== Major intersections ==
| County | Location | mi | km | Destinations | Notes |
|---|---|---|---|---|---|
| Red River | | 38.38 | 61.77 | SH 8 south – New Boston | Continuation into Texas |
| Red River | | 38.38 | 61.77 | Marion H. Crank Memorial Bridge | |
| Little River | | 29.38 | 47.28 | AR 32 east – Ashdown | Southern end of AR 32 concurrency |
| Little River | | 28.65 | 46.11 | AR 108S west | Eastern terminus of AR 108S |
| Little River | Foreman | 27.49 | 44.24 | AR 32 west / AR 108 (2nd Avenue) – Foreman Business District, Alleene | Northern end of AR 32 concurrency |
| Little River | Cross Roads | 19.60 | 31.54 | AR 234 – Winthrop | |
| Little River | Billingsleys Corner | 12.54 | 20.18 | AR 380 west – Cerrogordo | Eastern terminus of AR 380 |
| Little River | | 11.26– 10.88 | 18.12– 17.51 | Bridge | |
| Sevier | Horatio | 8.74 | 14.07 | AR 24 west (Williams Street) | Southern end of AR 24 concurrency |
| Sevier | | 6.80 | 10.94 | AR 24 east – Lockesburg | Northern end of AR 24 concurrency |
| Sevier | De Queen | 0.00 | 0.00 | US 70B / AR 329 south (Stilwell Avenue) – De Queen Business District | Northern terminus; northern terminus of AR 329 |
Gap in route
| Logan | | 18.62 | 29.97 | AR 23 – Caulksville, Chismville | Southern terminus |
| Franklin | Branch | 12.08 | 19.44 | AR 22 west – Fort Smith | Southern end of AR 22 concurrency |
| Franklin | Branch | 11.48 | 18.48 | AR 22 east – Paris | Northern end of AR 22 concurrency |
| Franklin | | 9.48 | 15.26 | AR 398 east | Western terminus of AR 398 |
| Franklin | Peter Pender | 7.64 | 12.30 | AR 60 west | Eastern terminus of AR 60 |
| Franklin | Peter Pender | 7.40 | 11.91 | AR 288 east | Western terminus of AR 288 |
| Franklin | Cecil | 1.45 | 2.33 | AR 96 to AR 23 – Lavaca | |
| Franklin | | 0.00 | 0.00 | Citadel Park Road | Northern terminus |
1.000 mi = 1.609 km; 1.000 km = 0.621 mi: Concurrency terminus

== History ==
Highway 41 was created during the 1926 Arkansas state highway numbering. The original route was established between De Queen and Texas and has remained largely unchanged. A second segment was created between Highway 96 in Cecil to and Highway 22 in Branch in 1953. (Note: Highway 41 appears on the Official 1953 map, but not on the Supplemental Printing of the Official 1952 map, which was issued in March 1953.) The Arkansas State Highway Commission extended the route to Chismville on June 23, 1965. The Highway 41 designation was extended to the current northern terminus at Citadel Bluff Park on September 25, 1968. Road construction in Foreman led to a minor alignment change in 1970, with the Highway 41 designation moving from 10th Avenue, Schuman Street, and Bell Street to the newly constructed Madden Street. A similar realignment took place in De Queen in 1980; with Highway 41 being rerouted away from the historic city center to a newly constructed roadway.

=== De Queen business route ===
Highway 41B
- Location: Sevier County
- Length: 0.9 mi (1,400 m)
- Existed: January 30, 1980–February 19, 1992

Arkansas Highway 41 Business was a business route of 0.9 miles (1.4 km) in Sevier County. The route ran from Highway 41 south of De Queen north to US 70B in De Queen.

The highway was a former alignment of Highway 41, retained in the state highway system following a rerouting of the parent route. It was deleted on February 19, 1992 by the Arkansas State Highway Commission at the request of the Mayor of De Queen, with the city accepting maintenance responsibilities.

Major intersections

The entire route is in Sevier County.

| Location | mi | km | Destinations | Notes |
|---|---|---|---|---|
| | 0.0 | 0.0 | AR 41 | Southern terminus |
| De Queen | 0.9 | 1.4 | US 70B (Stilwell Avenue / 4th Street) | Northern terminus |
1.000 mi = 1.609 km; 1.000 km = 0.621 mi
