= Battle of Ohio =

Battle of Ohio may refer to:

- Battle of Ohio (MLB), a baseball rivalry between the Cleveland Guardians and the Cincinnati Reds
- Battle of Ohio (NFL), American football rivalry between the Cleveland Browns and the Cincinnati Bengals
- See the Battle for Ohio, referring to the main theatre of the Northwest Indian War fought 1785–1795
