= Horatio School District =

School district in Arkansas, United States

Address
- 205 Isbell Street Horatio, Arkansas, 71842; United States

District information
- Type: Public
- Grades: PreK–12
- NCES District ID: 0507860

Students and staff
- Students: 783
- Teachers: 81.42
- Staff: 66.1
- Student–teacher ratio: 9.62

Other information
- Website: www.horatioschools.org

Horatio School District 55 is a school district in Sevier County, Arkansas, United States. It serves Horatio and Winthrop. It operates Horatio Elementary School and Horatio High School.

On July 1, 1992, the Winthrop School District consolidated into the Horatio district.
