= Gary Stubblefield =

American politician (1951–2025)

Member of the Arkansas Senate from the 26th district (Previously 3rd district)
- In office January 14, 2013 – September 2, 2025
- Preceded by: redistricted
- Succeeded by: Brad Simon

Member of the Arkansas House of Representatives from the 67th district
- In office 2011 – January 14, 2013
- Succeeded by: redistricted

Personal details
- Born: February 28, 1951 Charleston, Arkansas, U.S.
- Died: September 2, 2025 (aged 74) Little Rock, Arkansas, U.S.
- Party: Republican
- Education: County Line High School
- Profession: Farmer

Gary Don Stubblefield (February 28, 1951 – September 2, 2025) was an American politician from Arkansas. A Republican, he was a member of the Arkansas Senate, elected from District 26, beginning in 2013. He also served as a member of the Arkansas House of Representatives, a quorum court, and a school board.

== Early life and business career ==
Stubblefield was born in Charleston, Arkansas, on February 28, 1951. He graduated from County Line High School in Branch, Arkansas in 1969. He became a cattle farmer.

== Political career ==
Stubblefield was a member of the Franklin County quorum court from 1976 to 1977 and spent six years on the County Line School District board in the 1980s. He spent one term in the Arkansas House of Representatives from House District 67 before running for state Senate in 2012.

An opponent of Medicaid expansion, Stubblefield voted against a 2019 bill to accept Medicaid expansion in Arkansas; which passed the Senate on a 27–4 vote.

In 2017, Stubblefield introduced legislation to weaken the state's freedom of information (FOI) act by precluding the public release of information about K–12 schools, colleges and university campus police departments, and the Arkansas State Capitol police force. Stubblefield's bill would have blocked the release of information about the number of police officers or security officers, statistics on the racial and gender makeup of police forces, and possibly even security-video footage. Critics such as the Arkansas Press Association decried Stubblefield's proposal for its potential to enable secret police. Public records advocates said that the restrictions were the most significant restriction on access to Arkansas public records since adoption of the state's FOI law in 1967.

Stubblefield described the 1619 Project and "critical race theory" as divisive and co-sponsored a bill to ban teaching the 1619 Project in Arkansas public schools. He sponsored a resolution on African American history that downplayed the role of slavery in the American history and criticized Democrats; it was defeated 22–4.

In 2020, Stubblefield clashed with Governor Asa Hutchinson, a fellow Republican, over refugee resettlement in Arkansas, which Stubblefield opposed and Hutchinson supports. At a Senate committee hearing, Stubblefield said that "Every morning when I wake up and turn on the national news, sometimes I ask myself a question: 'Am I still in the United States of America?'" David Ramsey of the Arkansas Times criticized Stubblefield for his statements, calling it "rank demagoguery."

In 2021, Stubblefield sponsored nullification legislation that would have banned Arkansas state and local police from enforcing federal gun laws, and threatened to impose criminal liability on state and local officers for assisting in enforcing federal gun laws. Similar "nullification" laws have been held by the courts to be unconstitutional, and opponents charged that the passage of the bill would break down federal-state cooperation and endanger public safety. The bill passed the Senate on a 21–12 vote, but was vetoed by Governor Hutchinson, who previously vetoed several other "culture war" bills passed by fellow Republicans in the state legislature. However, the Senate voted (by a simple majority) to override the veto, with Republicans in the chamber split on the override.

During the COVID-19 pandemic in Arkansas, Stubblefield staunchly opposed the appointment of Dr. José Romero to head the Arkansas Department of Health due to Romero's discouragement of the use of hydroxychloroquine as a treatment for COVID-19; there is no evidence to indicate that hydroxychloroquine, an anti-malarial, is an effective COVID-19 treatment. Romero was ultimately confirmed on a 25–8 vote. During the pandemic, Stubblefield also touted ivermectin, a cattle dewormer, as treatment against COVID-19; the FDA does not recommend ivermectin to prevent or treat COVID-19.

== Personal life and death ==
Stubblefield was a Baptist. He died at the UAMS Medical Center in Little Rock, Arkansas, on September 2, 2025, at the age of 74.
