= County Line School District =

School district in Arkansas, United States

Address
- 12092 West State Highway 22 Branch, Arkansas, 72928; United States

District information
- Type: Public
- Grades: PreK–12
- NCES District ID: 0504740

Students and staff
- Students: 515
- Teachers: 46.13
- Staff: 35.36
- Student–teacher ratio: 11.16

Other information
- Website: indians.wsc.k12.ar.us

== County Line School District ==
The County Line School District is a small school located in Branch, Arkansas in Franklin County. The superintendent is Taylor Gattis, the Elementary Principal, ABC Coordinator, and Federal Coordinator is Linda Teague, and the High school principal is Eric Parsons. County Line school district serves grades K through twelfth, and it is currently separated into two school sections the elementary school (K through sixth grade) and the high school (seventh through twelfth grade). The overall 2019-2020 enrollment in the County Line school district is 492. Their graduation rate is ninety five percent, which is ten percent higher than the United States average of eighty five percent. The student teacher ratio is 1/10, making the average class size approximately twelve students per class room. one hundred percent of County Line school District's teachers are certified, and eighty nine percent of the teachers have more than three years of experience.

== Elementary school ==
The County Line Elementary school serves grades K through sixth with the enrollment in 2019-2020 being 263. The County Line Elementary Principal, ABC Coordinator, Federal Coordinator is Linda Teague. The elementary school offers an after school program; however, they do not offer before school, weekend, summer programs. The elementary school does offer breakfast and lunch programs; however, they cost. The academic programs that are used are gifted and talented and the enrichment programs are tutoring and the science club.

== High school ==
The County Line High school serves grades seventh through twelfth, with the enrollment in 2019-2020 being 225. The County Line High school's principal is Eric Parsons. The High school not only has a after school program but the also has a before school program; however, they do not provide a weekend or summer program. The breakfast and lunch programs are provided, but there is a fee. The academic programs that are used are gifted and talented, concurrent credit, and AP courses, and the enrichment programs that are used are Beta club, Science club, and tutoring. The student teacher ratio is seven to one, with the average class size being eight students. The graduation rate is ninety five percent.

== Academics ==
County Line school assumes that students must complete the Smart Core curriculum developed by the Arkansas Department of Education (ADE), which requires students to complete at least 22 units prior to graduation. Students complete regular and career focus courses and exams and may select Advanced Placement (AP) coursework and exams that provide an opportunity to receive college credit.
