= Arkansas Highway 398 =

State highway in Arkansas, United States

Highway 398

Route information
- Maintained by ArDOT

Section 1
- Length: 2.47 mi (3.98 km)
- West end: AR 41
- East end: CR 62

Section 2
- Length: 1.13 mi (1.82 km)
- South end: AR 23, Caulksville
- North end: AR 22, Ratcliff

Location
- Country: United States
- State: Arkansas

Highway system
- Arkansas Highway System; Interstate; US; State; Business; Spurs; Suffixed; Scenic; Heritage
← AR 397	→ AR 399

Arkansas Highway 398 is a designation for two state highways in Arkansas. One segment in Franklin County runs 2.47 miles (3.98 km) from Highway 41 to County Route 62. Another segment in Logan County runs 1.13 miles (1.82 km) north from Highway 23 in Caulksville to Highway 22 in Ratcliff.

== Route description ==
=== Franklin County ===
The route starts at AR 41 south of Peter Pender and runs due east to terminate at Franklin County Route 62.

=== Logan County ===
The route connects AR 23 in Caulksville and AR 22 in Ratcliff.

== History ==
The Franklin County route was designated and most recently paved in 1978. The segment in Logan County was last paved in 1981.

== Major intersections ==
County	Location	mi	km	Destinations	Notes
Franklin		0.0	0.0	AR 41	Western terminus
Franklin		2.47	3.98	CR 62	Eastern terminus
Gap in route
Logan	Caulksville	0.00	0.00	AR 23	Southern terminus
Logan	Ratcliff	1.13	1.82	AR 22	Northern terminus
1.000 mi = 1.609 km; 1.000 km = 0.621 mi

== See also ==
- List of state highways in Arkansas
