= Arkansas Highway 329 =

State highway in Arkansas, United States

Highway 329

Route information
- Maintained by ArDOT
- Length: 7.84 mi (12.62 km)

Major junctions
- South end: AR 24
- North end: US 70B / AR 41 in De Queen

Location
- Country: United States
- State: Arkansas
- Counties: Sevier

Highway system
- Arkansas Highway System; Interstate; US; State; Business; Spurs; Suffixed; Scenic; Heritage
← AR 328	→ AR 330

Arkansas Highway 329 (AR 329, Hwy. 329) is a north–south state highway of 7.84 miles (12.62 km) in Sevier County, Arkansas. The route funs from Highway 24 near Lockesburg northwest to US Route 70 Business (US 70B) and Highway 41 in De Queen.

== Route description ==
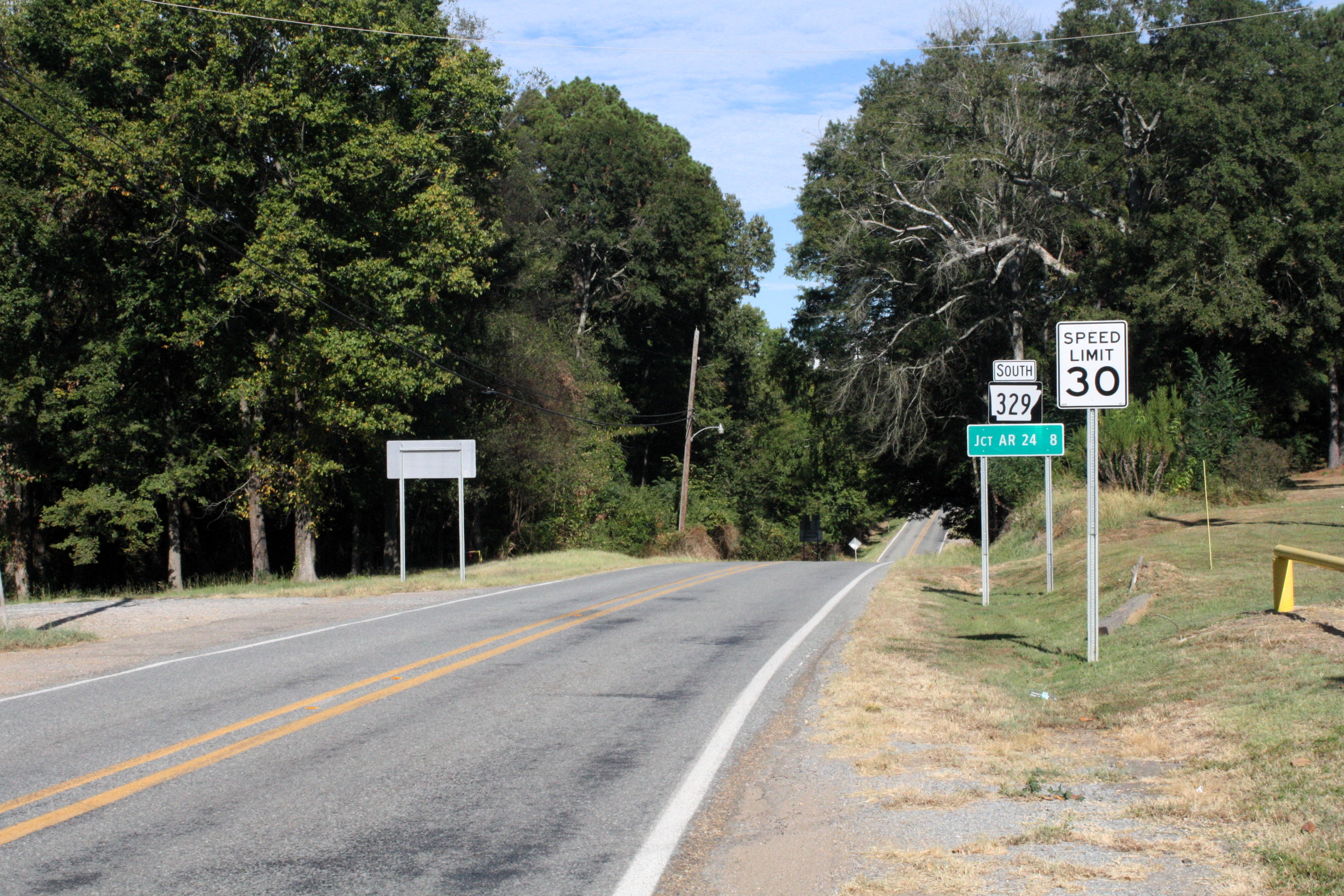
First reassurance marker for Arkansas Highway 329 east of AR 41 junction in De Queen, AR

The highway begins west of Lockesburg at Highway 24. Highway 329 runs through forested areas nearby the De Queen and Eastern Railroad tracks generally northwest until it meets US 70B and Highway 41 in De Queen. This junction is near the De Queen and Eastern Railroad Machine Shop on the National Register of Historic Places.

== Major intersections ==
The entire route is in Sevier County.

Location	mi	km	Destinations	Notes
	0.00	0.00	AR 24 – Horatio, Lockesburg, Nashville	Southern terminus
De Queen	7.84	12.62	US 70B / AR 41 south – Horatio, De Queen Business District	Northern terminus; northern terminus of AR 41
1.000 mi = 1.609 km; 1.000 km = 0.621 mi

== History ==
Highway 329 is part of the original 1926 alignment of U.S. Route 71.
