= Branch, Arkansas =

Branch
- City
- Location in Arkansas Location in the United States
- Coordinates: 35°18′27″N 93°57′21″W
- Country: United States
- State: Arkansas
- County: Franklin

Area
  - Total: 3.12 sq mi (8.09 km^{2})
  - Land: 3.12 sq mi (8.09 km^{2})
  - Water: 0 sq mi (0.00 km^{2})
- Elevation: 469 ft (143 m)

Population (2020)
  - Total: 296
  - Estimate (2025): 314 ▲
  - Density: 94.8/sq mi (36.59/km^{2})
- Time zone: UTC-6 (Central (CST))
  - Summer (DST): UTC-5 (CDT)
- ZIP code: 72928
- Area code: 479
- FIPS code: 05-08440
- GNIS feature ID: 2403912

Branch is a city in Franklin County, Arkansas, United States. The population was 296 at the 2020 census.

== Geography ==
Branch is located in southwestern Franklin County at the junctions of Arkansas Highways 22 and 41. Highway 22 leads east 5 miles (8 km) to Caulksville and west 5 miles (8 km) to Charleston, while Highway 41 leads north 10 miles (16 km) to Cecil and south 14 miles (23 km) to Booneville. Fort Smith is 28 miles (45 km) to the west.

According to the United States Census Bureau, Branch has a total area of 3.6 square miles (9.2 km^{2}), all land.

== Demographics ==
Historical population
Census	Pop.	Note	%±
1910	271		—
1920	370		36.5%
1930	318		−14.1%
1940	390		22.6%
1950	308		−21.0%
1960	258		−16.2%
1970	325		26.0%
1980	353		8.6%
1990	299		−15.3%
2000	357		19.4%
2010	367		2.8%
2020	296		−19.3%
2024 (est.)	307	▲	3.7%
U.S. Decennial Census; 2014 Estimate

As of the census of 2000, there were 357 people, 141 households, and 106 families residing in the city. The population density was 100.1 inhabitants per square mile (38.6/km^{2}). There were 155 housing units at an average density of 43.5 units per square mile (16.8 units/km^{2}). The racial makeup of the city was 96.08% White, 1.68% Native American, 0.84% Asian, 0.56% from other races, and 0.84% from two or more races. 0.56% of the population were Hispanic or Latino of any race.

There were 141 households, out of which 31.9% had children under the age of 18 living with them, 63.8% were married couples living together, 6.4% had a female householder with no husband present, and 24.8% were non-families. 21.3% of all households were made up of individuals, and 7.8% had someone living alone who was 65 years of age or older. The average household size was 2.53 and the average family size was 2.92.

In the city, the population was spread out, with 24.4% under the age of 18, 7.0% from 18 to 24, 29.7% from 25 to 44, 24.6% from 45 to 64, and 14.3% who were 65 years of age or older. The median age was 37 years. For every 100 females, there were 108.8 males. For every 100 females age 18 and over, there were 103.0 males.

The median income for a household in the city was $29,531, and the median income for a family was $33,750. Males had a median income of $21,875 versus $17,266 for females. The per capita income for the city was $15,317. About 6.9% of families and 9.9% of the population were below the poverty line, including 16.9% of those under age 18 and none of those age 65 or over.

== Notable people ==
- Gary Stubblefield, state senator from Franklin County; dairy farmer in Branch
