= Fonda Hawthorne =

American politician

Fonda F. Hawthorne

Member of the Arkansas House of Representatives from the 4th district
- In office 2013–2015
- Preceded by: Lane Jean
- Succeeded by: DeAnn Vaught

Personal details
- Born: 1956 (age 69–70) Stuttgart, Arkansas County; Arkansas, US
- Party: Democratic
- Spouse: Steve Hawthorne
- Children: 2
- Education: Texarkana College; Ouachita Baptist University
- Occupation: Economic Development Officer

Fonda F. Hawthorne (born 1956) is a former one-term member of the Arkansas House of Representatives. She represented the 4th district from 2013 to 2015 for the Democratic Party. She served on the Public Transportation, City County and Local Affairs, and Legislative Joint Auditing committees.

== Career ==
Prior to running for the Arkansas House of Representatives, Hawthorne was a member of the De Queen-Sevier County Chamber of Commerce.

She ran for election for the 4th district of Arkansas in 2012, and served in the House of Representatives from 2013 to 2015 under the Democratic Party. She was defeated for reelection on November 4, 2014, by DeAnn Vaught, a Republican farmer from Horatio, Arkansas. Vaught won by a 59-41 margin in a general Republican sweep of Arkansas elections.

In 2019, Hawthorne was sentenced to four months in jail for embezzling money from the Ashdown-Little River County Chamber of Commerce to buy alcohol and tobacco, which she claimed was the result of alcoholism, which she went to rehab for.
