= Paula Casey =

American lawyer

United States Attorney for the Eastern District of Arkansas
- In office 1993–2000
- President: Bill Clinton
- Preceded by: Richard M. Pence, Jr. (acting)
- Succeeded by: Michael D. Johnson (acting)

Personal details
- Born: Paula Jean Casey; February 16, 1951 (age 75) Charleston, Arkansas, U.S.
- Spouse(s): Gilbert L. Glover, II
- Education: East Central University (BA); University of Arkansas School of Law (JD)

Paula Jean Casey (born February 16, 1951) is an American lawyer who served as United States Attorney for the Eastern District of Arkansas (1993–2000).

She earned her B.A. degree in 1973 at East Central University in Oklahoma and her J.D. in 1977 at University of Arkansas School of Law at Fayetteville.

Casey was a professor at the William H. Bowen School of Law of the University of Arkansas at Little Rock from 1978 to 1993, when she left to become U.S. Attorney. She was an associate dean of the school from 1986 through 1991. She worked with United States Senator Dale Bumpers as Chief Counsel and Legislative Assistant, from 1991 through 1993. She was appointed United States Attorney by Bill Clinton in 1993, serving through 2000. She rejoined the University of Arkansas at Little Rock Law School faculty in 2001.

Professor Casey has taught lawyering skills, criminal procedure, evidence, advanced litigation, family law, and property. In 2012 she was recognized by the university for outstanding teaching. She also received the FBI Meritorious Achievement Award in 1997 and numerous other awards from various state, federal, and local law enforcement agencies. Most notably, she was the only United States Attorney to receive an award from the Organized Crime and Drug Enforcement Task Force for her successful investigation and prosecution of a notable racketeering case.

On February 21, 2012, the University of Arkansas at Little Rock William H. Bowen School of Law announced that Professor Casey would serve as the interim dean beginning on July 1, 2012. She retired from that position on June 30, 2013. From 2013 until 2016, she served as the interim Vice Provost for Research and Dean of the Graduate School.
