= Charleston High School (Arkansas) =

Location
- 125 West Main Street; Charleston, Arkansas 72933; United States
- Coordinates: 35°17′43″N 94°3′32″W

Information
- School type: Public, Comprehensive
- Status: Open
- School district: Charleston School District
- NCES District ID: 050420
- Oversight: Arkansas Department of Education (ADE)
- CEEB code: 040420
- NCES School ID: 050420000158
- Principal: Shane Storey
- Teaching staff: 54.87 (on FTE basis)
- Grades: 7–12
- Enrollment: 418 (2023–2024)
  - Grade 7: 53
  - Grade 8: 63
  - Grade 9: 83
  - Grade 10: 94
  - Grade 11: 59
  - Grade 12: 66
- Student to teacher ratio: 7.62
- Education system: ADE Smart Core curriculum
- Classes offered: Regular, Advanced Placement
- Campus type: Rural
- Colors: Black and gold
- Athletics conference: 3A Region 5 (2012-14)
- Mascot: Tiger
- Team name: Charleston Tigers
- Accreditation: ADE
- Affiliation: Arkansas Activities Association (AAA)
- Website: tigers.wsc.k12.ar.us/highschool.htm

Charleston High School is an accredited comprehensive public secondary school for students in grades 7 through 12, located in the city of Charleston, Arkansas, one of two county seats in Franklin County. The school is the sole high school managed by the Charleston School District.

== Academics ==
Charleston High School is Title I school fully accredited by the ADE that is meeting standards and is an Achieving school under Adequate Yearly Progress requirements of NCLB. The assumed course of study for students follows the Smart Core curriculum developed by the Arkansas Department of Education (ADE), which requires students complete at least 22 units to graduate. Students engage in regular courses and exams and may take Advanced Placement (AP) coursework and exams with the opportunity for college credit.

== Athletics ==
The Charleston High School mascot is the tiger with black and gold serving as the school colors.

The Charleston Tigers are members of the 3A Classification administered by the Arkansas Activities Association competing in the 3A Region 4 Conference for interscholastic sporting activities. The Tigers participation includes: football, volleyball, golf (boys/girls), basketball (boys/girls), baseball, softball, and track and field (boys/girls).

=== Football ===
The Tigers football team has won six state championships (2005 at Class 2A; 2008, 2011, 2013, 2014, and 2022 at Class 3A).

=== Basketball ===
The Lady Tigers basketball team won the 2009 & 2018 Class 3A state championship. The boys basketball team were state finalists and runners-up in the 2012 and 2013 Class 3A.

== Notable people ==
The following are notable people associated with Charleston High School. If the person was a Charleston High School student, the number in parentheses indicates the year of graduation; if the person was a faculty or staff member, that person's title and years of association are included:

- Dale Bumpers (1943)—38th Arkansas Governor (1971–75); U.S. Senator (1975–99).
- Steve Cox—Former professional football player; inductee, Arkansas Sports Hall of Fame; placekicker/punter for Super Bowl XXIII-winning Washington Redskins.
