= Charleston, Arkansas =

- City
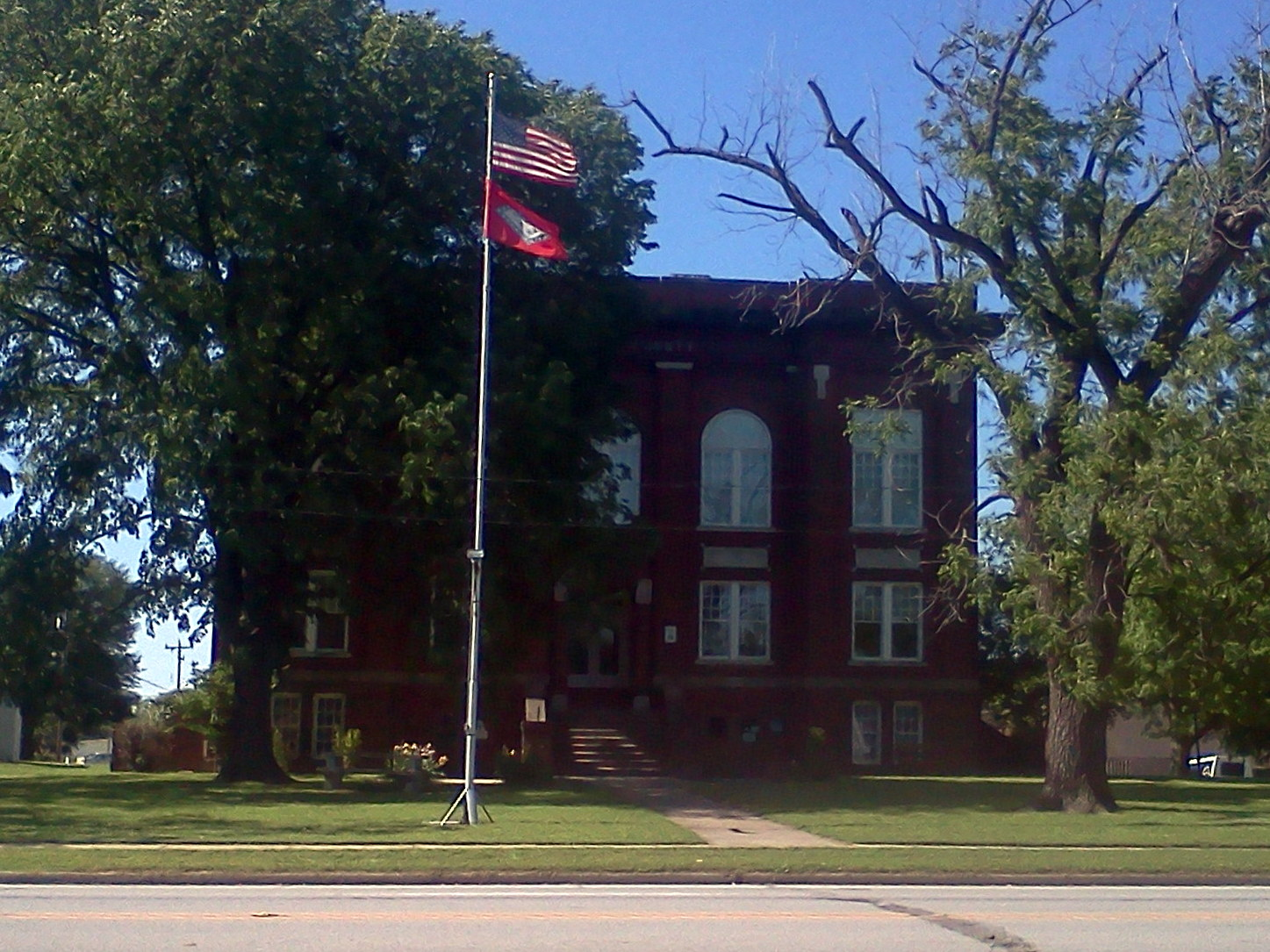
- Franklin County Courthouse, Southern District

- Location of Charleston in Franklin County, Arkansas.
- Coordinates: 35°17′41″N 94°02′54″W
- Country: United States
- State: Arkansas
- County: Franklin

Area
  - Total: 3.94 sq mi (10.21 km^{2})
  - Land: 3.83 sq mi (9.93 km^{2})
  - Water: 0.11 sq mi (0.28 km^{2})
- Elevation: 485 ft (148 m)

Population (2020)
  - Total: 2,588
  - Estimate (2025): 2,760 ▲
  - Density: 675.0/sq mi (260.62/km^{2})
- Time zone: UTC-6 (Central (CST))
  - Summer (DST): UTC-5 (CDT)
- ZIP code: 72933
- Area code: 479
- FIPS code: 05-13300
- GNIS feature ID: 2404028
- Website: charlestonar.gov

Charleston is a city in Franklin County, Arkansas, United States, and along with Ozark is one of the two county seats of Franklin County. The population was 2,588 at the 2020 census.

== History ==
Charleston was platted in 1870.

In 1954, Charleston was the first school district in the former Confederate States to implement school integration in response to Brown v. Board of Education. On July 27, 1954, the school board, including President Howard Madison Orsburn, George Hairston, Archibald Schaffer, Herbert Shumate, and Homer Keith, unanimously voted to "disband the Colored School and admit the Colored children into the grade and high school when classes open for the fall semester." Accordingly, when the schools opened on August 23, 11 black children were in attendance alongside 480 whites. School Superintendent Woodie Haynes made an agreement with the local press not to cover the event, and stonewalled any outside reporters that asked questions. The decision to integrate had financial benefits, as the district had been paying a considerable sum to transport black high school students to Fort Smith, and were able to close the old Rosenwald school. During the Civil Rights era, the city was among a few Southern cities which surprisingly showed little resistance to integration. Charleston suffered some discrimination from other schools and the state; many schools refused to play football against them and the band was denied the opportunity to play in some band competitions. In 1961, the first two black students to graduate from Charleston were Barbara (Williams) Dotson and Joe Ferguson.

== Geography ==
Charleston is in southwestern Franklin County, along Arkansas Highway 22, which leads east 9 miles (14 km) to Ratcliff and west 24 miles (39 km) to Fort Smith.

According to the United States Census Bureau, Charleston has a total area of 4.4 square miles (11.4 km^{2}), of which 4.3 square miles (11.1 km^{2}) is land and 0.1 square miles (0.3 km^{2}), or 2.53%, is water.

== Demographics ==
Historical population
Census	Pop.	Note	%±
1880	393		—
1890	370		−5.9%
1910	576		—
1920	734		27.4%
1930	851		15.9%
1940	958		12.6%
1950	968		1.0%
1960	1,036		7.0%
1970	1,497		44.5%
1980	1,748		16.8%
1990	2,128		21.7%
2000	2,965		39.3%
2010	2,494		−15.9%
2020	2,588		3.8%
2025 (est.)	2,760	▲	6.6%
U.S. Decennial Census; 2014 Estimate

=== 2020 census ===
As of the 2020 census, Charleston had a population of 2,588. The median age was 38.5 years. 26.8% of residents were under the age of 18 and 20.1% were 65 years of age or older. For every 100 females, there were 88.8 males, and for every 100 females age 18 and over, there were 84.2 males age 18 and over.

0.0% of residents lived in urban areas, while 100.0% lived in rural areas.

There were 973 households in Charleston, of which 37.6% had children under the age of 18 living in them. Of all households, 49.2% were married-couple households, 13.9% were households with a male householder and no spouse or partner present, and 29.1% were households with a female householder and no spouse or partner present. About 27.1% of all households were made up of individuals, and 15.8% had someone living alone who was 65 years of age or older.

There were 1,090 housing units, of which 10.7% were vacant. The homeowner vacancy rate was 2.2% and the rental vacancy rate was 9.0%. A separate 2020 census tabulation reported 639 families residing in the city.

Charleston racial composition
Race	Number	Percentage
White (non-Hispanic)	2,280	88.1%
Black or African American (non-Hispanic)	23	0.89%
Native American	34	1.31%
Asian	9	0.35%
Other/Mixed	171	6.61%
Hispanic or Latino	71	2.74%

=== 2000 census ===
As of the census of 2000, there were 2,965 people, 1,201 households, and 815 families residing in the city. The population density was 706.4 inhabitants per square mile (272.7/km^{2}). There were 1,315 housing units at an average density of 313.3 per square mile (121.0/km^{2}). The racial makeup of the city was 95.58% White, 0.07% Black or African American, 0.64% Native American, 0.34% Asian, 1.48% from other races, and 1.89% from two or more races. 2.06% of the population were Hispanic or Latino of any race.

There were 1,201 households, out of which 31.7% had children under the age of 18 living with them, 52.3% were married couples living together, 11.9% had a female householder with no husband present, and 32.1% were non-families. 29.2% of all households were made up of individuals, and 14.7% had someone living alone who was 65 years of age or older. The average household size was 2.40 and the average family size was 2.96.

In the city, the population was spread out, with 25.7% under the age of 18, 7.9% from 18 to 24, 26.7% from 25 to 44, 20.4% from 45 to 64, and 19.3% who were 65 years of age or older. The median age was 38 years. For every 100 females, there were 92.3 males. For every 100 females age 18 and over, there were 89.7 males.

The median income for a household in the city was $30,824, and the median income for a family was $39,598. Males had a median income of $27,917 versus $18,512 for females. The per capita income for the city was $14,912. About 8.6% of families and 14.4% of the population were below the poverty line, including 17.1% of those under age 18 and 16.6% of those age 65 or over.

== Education ==
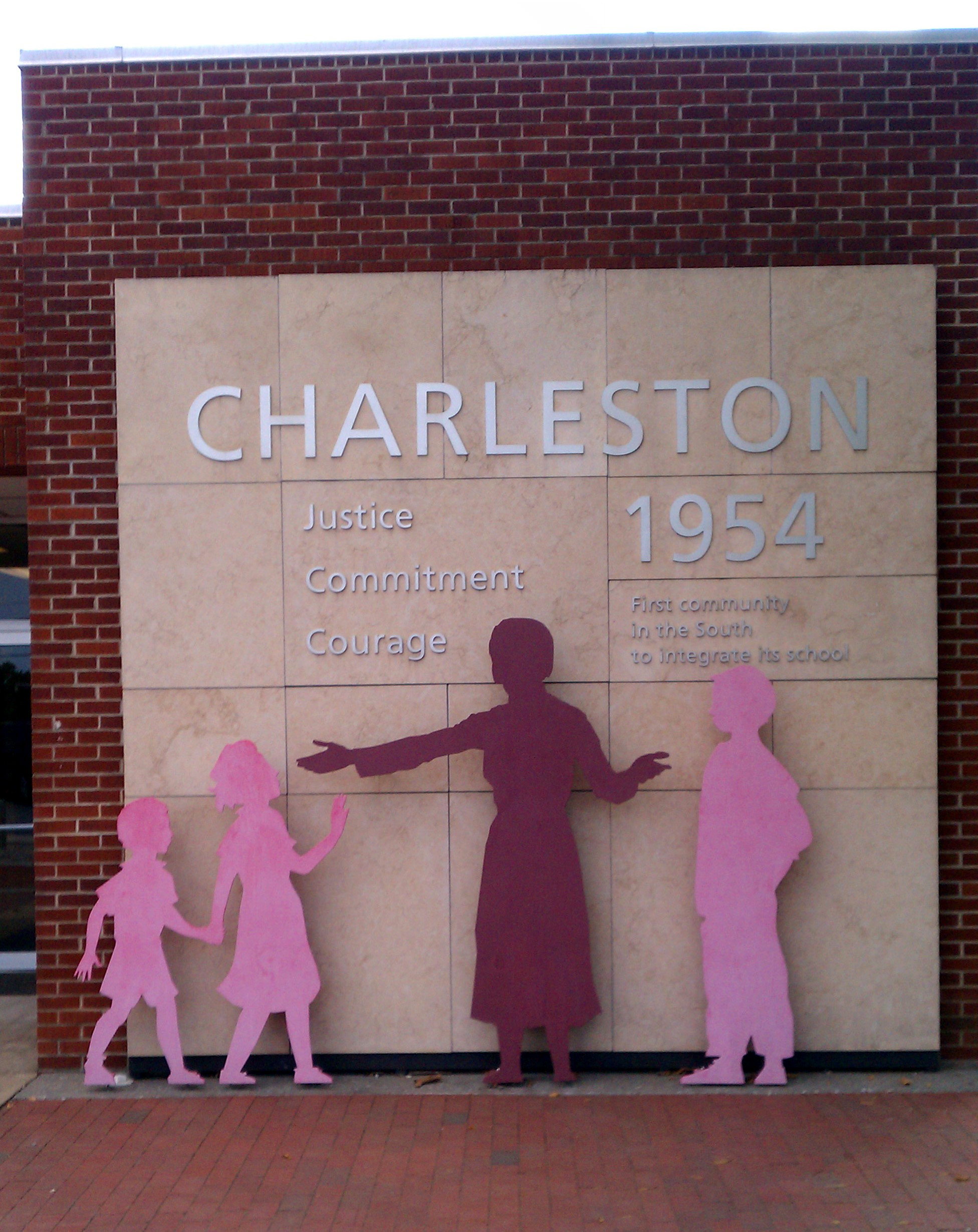

=== Public education ===
The Charleston School District provides public education from kindergarten through grade 12 from its three facilities, Charleston High School (grades 9–12), Charleston Elementary School (grades K–4), and Charleston Middle School (grades 5–8).

The Public School District of Charleston, Arkansas was the first school district to integrate in the former Confederate States of America. The high school was destroyed in middle 2010 to make way for a larger middle school. There is currently a small monument to the integration in front of Charleston Middle School designated the Charleston National Commemorative Site.

== Notable people ==
- John "Tree" Adams, former American football offensive tackle with the Washington Redskins from 1945 to 1949
- Betty Bumpers, first lady of Arkansas
- Dale Bumpers, governor of Arkansas and U.S. senator from Arkansas
- DeRosey Caroll Cabell, Army General
- Paula Casey, United States Attorney
- Steve Cox, former American football player with the Washington Redskins
- Otis Davis, baseball player for the Brooklyn Dodgers
- Denny Flynn, bull rider
- Francis Irby Gwaltney, author
- Larry Lester, historian, author, and co-founder of Negro League Baseball Museum
- Gary Stubblefield, Arkansas state senator
- Jesse G. Vincent, aircraft, marine, and automobile engine designer
