= County Line High School =

Location
- 12092 W State Highway 22; Branch, Arkansas 72928; United States; 35°18′28″N 93°55′6″W

Information
- Established: 1950 (76 years ago)
- School district: County Line School District
- NCES District ID: 0500740
- CEEB code: 040280
- NCES School ID: 050474000198
- Teaching staff: 27.13 (FTE)
- Grades: 7–12
- Enrollment: 242 (2023–2024)
- Student to teacher ratio: 8.92
- Campus type: Rural
- Colors: Red and gray
- Athletics conference: 1A West (2012-14)
- Team name: Indians
- Website: indians.wsc.k12.ar.us/74961_3

County Line High School is a comprehensive high school in Branch, Arkansas located along the Franklin County and Logan County border. Established in 1950, school supports students in grades 7 through 12 and is administered by the County Line School District.

== Academics ==
The assumed course of study that students complete is the Smart Core curriculum developed by the Arkansas Department of Education (ADE), which requires students to complete at least 22 units prior to graduation. Students complete regular and career focus courses and exams and may select Advanced Placement (AP) coursework and exams that provide an opportunity to receive college credit.

== Extracurricular activities ==
The mascot of County Line is the Indian.

The Indians compete in a variety of sports including baseball, basketball (boys/girls), golf (boys/girls), softball, and track and field administered by the Arkansas Activities Association.

In 2003, John Robert Wyatt Jr., with 1,136 overall wins, was posthumously inducted into the Arkansas High School Coaches Association Hall of Fame.

- 1971 : Class B Boys State Basketball Champions
- 1991: Class 1A Girls State Basketball Champions
- 1996: Class 1A Girls State Basketball Champions
- 2023: Class 1A Boys State Basketball Champions

== Notable alumni ==
- Denny Flynn, bull rider
- Doc Sadler (former staff) - basketball coach and executive who has a 38–7 record as County Line basketball coach
- Gary Stubblefield (1969) - Arkansas state senator from Franklin County since 2013; former member of the Arkansas House of Representatives; dairy farmer in Branch, Arkansas
