= DeAnn Vaught =

American politician (born 1969)

DeAnn Kay Vaught
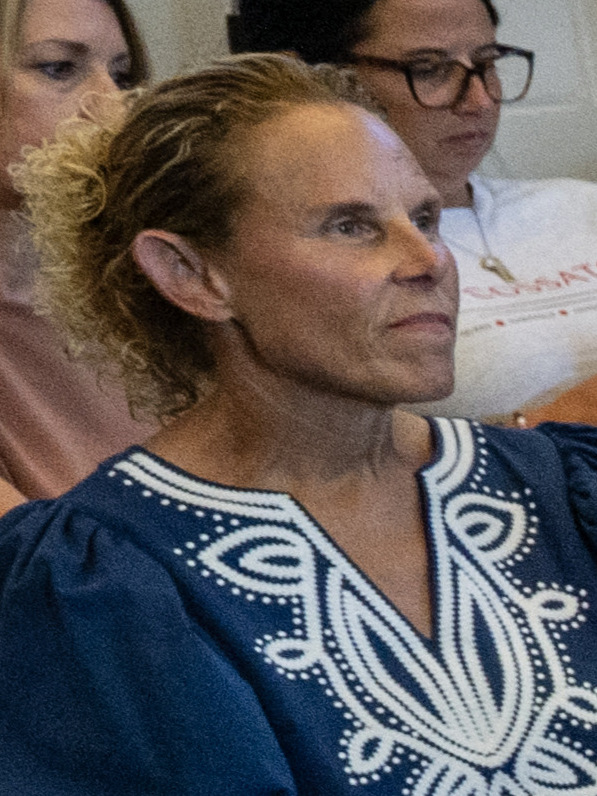
- Vaught in 2026

Member of the Arkansas House of Representatives from the 4th district
- In office January 1, 2015 – January 9, 2023
- Preceded by: Fonda Hawthorne
- Succeeded by: Jack Fortner

Member of the Arkansas House of Representatives from the 87th district
- Incumbent
- Assumed office January 9, 2023
- Preceded by: Robin Lundstrum

Personal details
- Born: 1970 (age 55–56) Ashdown, Arkansas
- Party: Republican
- Spouse: Jon Vaught
- Children: 3
- Education: Southern Arkansas University
- Occupation: Farmer

DeAnn Kay Vaught (born 1970) is a farmer from Horatio, Arkansas, who is a Republican member of the Arkansas House of Representatives for District 87.

Vaught graduated from Southern Arkansas University in Magnolia. She is affiliated with the Farm Bureau Federation. She and her husband, Jon, reside in Horatio with their three children. She is a Baptist.

In 2014, she unseated Democrat Fonda Hawthorne of Ashdown, winning 59 to 41 percent. Vaught sat on the Select Committee for Rules, the committee on Aging, Children and Youth Legislative and Military Affairs, the committee for Revenue and Taxation, and the committee for Legislative Joint Auditory Commerce.

Preceded by Fonda Hawthorne	Arkansas State Representative for District 4; 2015–2023	Succeeded by Jack Fortner
