= American Football Conference =

One of two conferences in the National Football League

- American Football Conference logo (2010–present)
- Formerly: American Football League (AFL)
- League: National Football League
- Sport: American football
- Founded: 1970
- No. of teams: 16
- Most recent champion: New England Patriots (12th title) (2025)
- Most titles: New England Patriots (12 titles)

The American Football Conference (AFC) is one of the two conferences of the National Football League (NFL), the highest level of professional American football in the United States. The AFC and its counterpart, the National Football Conference (NFC), each have 16 teams organized into four divisions. Both conferences were created as part of the 1970 merger between the National Football League, and the American Football League (AFL). All ten of the AFL teams, and three NFL teams, became members of the new AFC, with the remaining thirteen NFL teams forming the NFC. A series of league expansions and division realignments have occurred since the merger, thus making the current total of 16 teams in each conference. The current AFC champions are the New England Patriots, who defeated the Denver Broncos in the 2025 season's AFC Championship Game for their twelfth conference championship.

As of 2026, the AFC only has one defined officer, the president, which is essentially an honorary position with few powers and mostly ceremonial duties, including awarding the conference championship trophy.

== Teams ==
Like the NFC, the conference has 16 teams organized into four divisions each with four teams: East, North, South and West.

Division	Team	Stadium	Location	Ref(s)
East	Buffalo Bills	Highmark Stadium	Orchard Park, New York	
East	Miami Dolphins	Hard Rock Stadium	Miami Gardens, Florida	
East	New England Patriots	Gillette Stadium	Foxborough, Massachusetts	
East	New York Jets	MetLife Stadium	East Rutherford, New Jersey	
North	Baltimore Ravens	M&T Bank Stadium	Baltimore, Maryland	
North	Cincinnati Bengals	Paycor Stadium	Cincinnati, Ohio	
North	Cleveland Browns	Huntington Bank Field	Cleveland, Ohio	
North	Pittsburgh Steelers	Acrisure Stadium	Pittsburgh, Pennsylvania	
South	Houston Texans	NRG Stadium	Houston, Texas	
South	Indianapolis Colts	Lucas Oil Stadium	Indianapolis, Indiana	
South	Jacksonville Jaguars	EverBank Stadium	Jacksonville, Florida	
South	Tennessee Titans	Nissan Stadium	Nashville, Tennessee	
West	Denver Broncos	Empower Field at Mile High	Denver, Colorado	
West	Kansas City Chiefs	Arrowhead Stadium	Kansas City, Missouri	
West	Las Vegas Raiders	Allegiant Stadium	Paradise, Nevada	
West	Los Angeles Chargers	SoFi Stadium	Inglewood, California	

== Season structure ==
POS	AFC East	AFC North	AFC South	AFC West
1st	Bills	Ravens	Texans	Chiefs
2nd	Dolphins	Steelers	Colts	Chargers
3rd	Jets	Bengals	Jaguars	Broncos
4th	Patriots	Browns	Titans	Raiders
POS	NFC East	NFC North	NFC South	NFC West
1st	Eagles	Lions	Buccaneers	Rams
2nd	Commanders	Vikings	Falcons	Seahawks
3rd	Cowboys	Packers	Panthers	Cardinals
4th	Giants	Bears	Saints	49ers

This chart of the 2024 season standings displays an application of the NFL scheduling formula. The Chiefs in 2024 (highlighted in green) finished in first place in the AFC West. Thus, in 2025, the Chiefs will play two games against each of its division rivals (highlighted in light blue), one game against each team in the AFC South and NFC East (highlighted in yellow), and one game each against the first-place finishers in the AFC East, AFC North (highlighted in orange) and NFC North (highlighted in pink).

Currently, the fourteen opponents each team faces over the 17-game regular season schedule are set using a predetermined formula:

Each AFC team plays the other teams in their respective division twice (home and away) during the regular season, in addition to eleven other games assigned to their schedule by the NFL: three games are assigned on the basis of a particular team's final divisional standing from the previous season, and the remaining eight games are split between the roster of two other NFL divisions. This assignment shifts each year and will follow a standard cycle. Using the 2023 regular season schedule as an example, each team in the AFC West plays against every team in the AFC East and NFC North. In this way, non-divisional competition will be mostly among common opponents – the exception being the three games assigned based on the team's prior-season divisional standing.

At the end of each season, the four division winners and three wild cards (non-division winners with best regular season record) in the AFC qualify for the playoffs. The AFC playoffs culminate in the AFC Championship Game, with the winner receiving the Lamar Hunt Trophy. The AFC champion then plays the NFC champion in the Super Bowl. As of 2025 the AFC representative team has won the Super Bowl 27 out of the 55 total editions, with the Kansas City Chiefs being the most recent AFC Super Bowl winner in 2024. The New England Patriots have won the most AFC championships with 12, and share the record for the most Super Bowls won by a member of the conference with the Pittsburgh Steelers who won 8 AFC championships with 6.

== History ==
Original American Football Conference logo, based on the AFL logo with blue stars

With the impending merger with the American Football League (AFL) for the 1970 NFL season, the league discussed which teams would play in the newly instituted conferences. The then-president of the NFL and owner of the Cleveland Browns, Art Modell, suggested a format in which three teams from the NFL would move to the AFC to create two thirteen-team conferences. There was contention between NFL commissioner Pete Rozelle and the other owners over which teams would be required to change conferences (for his part, Modell had first assumed the three most recent expansion NFL teams – Minnesota Vikings, Atlanta Falcons, New Orleans Saints – would be the ones to move to the AFC); some owners wanted no realignment at all. The AFL had begun play in 1960 with eight teams, and had added two more before the merger (the Miami Dolphins in 1966 and the Cincinnati Bengals in 1968).

Modell was hospitalized for internal bleeding around the time negotiations were taking place. He was also struggling to service the debt he incurred from his purchase of the Browns, and realized there was an opportunity to establish a lucrative in-state rivalry with the newly established Bengals, who had been founded by Paul Brown after Modell had forced him out of Cleveland after purchasing the team.

When Modell was visited in the hospital by Art Rooney (owner of the Pittsburgh Steelers) and Wellington Mara (owner of the New York Giants), Modell offered to have his franchise move to the AFC, provided two other "old guard" franchises did so as well and the three affected teams to move were adequately compensated for joining what was still looked down on in NFL circles as a "junior" or "inferior" circuit. Not wanting to lose his long-established rivalry with Cleveland, the equally cash-strapped Rooney quickly agreed to join the Browns in the AFC. The other NFL owner to ultimately agree to move was Carroll Rosenbloom of the then-Baltimore Colts.

Thus, in order to equalize the number of teams in each conference, three NFL teams that predated the AFL's launch (the Browns, Steelers, and Colts) joined the ten former AFL teams to form the AFC in exchange for $3 million each in indemnities, with the announcement coming on May 10, 1969. The two AFL divisions AFL East and AFL West were more or less intact, while the NFL's Century Division, in which the Browns and the Steelers had played since 1967, was moved from the NFL to become the new AFC Central. Upon the completion of the merger in 1970, the newly minted American Football Conference had already agreed upon their divisional setup along mostly geographical lines for the 1970 season; the National Football Conference, however, could not agree upon their setup, and one was chosen from a fishbowl on January 16, 1970.

Since the merger, five expansion teams have joined the AFC and two have left, thus making the current total 16. When the Seattle Seahawks and Tampa Bay Buccaneers joined the league in 1976, they were temporarily placed in the NFC and AFC, respectively. This arrangement lasted for one season before the two teams switched conferences. The Seahawks eventually returned to the NFC as a result of the 2002 realignment. The expansion Jacksonville Jaguars joined the AFC in 1995. There have been five teams that have relocated at least once. In 1984, the Colts relocated to Indianapolis. In 1995, the Browns attempted to move to Baltimore; the resulting dispute between Cleveland and the team led to Modell establishing the Baltimore Ravens with the players and personnel from the Browns, while the Browns were placed in suspended operations before they were reinstated by the NFL. The Ravens were treated as an expansion team.

In California, the Oakland Raiders relocated to Los Angeles in 1982, back to Oakland in 1995, and then to Las Vegas in 2020, while the San Diego Chargers returned to Los Angeles in 2017 after 56 years in San Diego.

The Houston Oilers moved to Tennessee in 1997, where they were renamed the Tennessee Oilers. The team would change its name again, two years later, to the Tennessee Titans.

The NFL would again expand in 2002, adding the Houston Texans to the AFC. With the exception of the aforementioned relocations since that time, the divisional setup has remained static ever since.

Between 1995 and 2026, the AFC has sent only 9 of its 16 teams to the Super Bowl: New England Patriots (12 times), Kansas City Chiefs (5 times), Pittsburgh Steelers (4 times), Denver Broncos (4 times), Baltimore Ravens (twice), Indianapolis Colts (twice), Cincinnati Bengals (once), Las Vegas Raiders (once), Tennessee Titans (once). By contrast, the NFC has sent 13 of the 16 NFC teams during that same time frame with only the Detroit Lions, Minnesota Vikings, and Washington Commanders missing out on an appearance in the Super Bowl. 17 of the 19 AFC champions from 2001 to 2019 started one of just three quarterbacks – Tom Brady, Peyton Manning and Ben Roethlisberger – in the Super Bowl. The AFC has started 7 quarterbacks in the last 20 Super Bowls, while the NFC has started 16.

== Logo ==
2nd American Football Conference logo used from 1970 to 2009

The original AFC logo was very similar to the AFL logo, however the merged league quickly created an updated logo for the AFC that, while preserving the basic elements of the old AFL logo, used a much bolder red "A" and six similarly bold red stars surrounding it, in contrast to the six blue AFL stars. The league also created a logo for the NFC in 1970, which like the AFL and AFC logos also contained only the first letter as opposed to a full abbreviation, but with only three stars (to represent the then-three divisions of the Conference). The AFC logo basically remained unchanged from 1970 to 2009. The 2010 NFL season introduced an updated AFC logo, with the most notable revision being the removal of two stars (leaving four representing the four divisions of the AFC), and moving the stars inside the letter, similar to the NFC logo, which itself was updated at the same time to add a fourth star.

The Kansas City Chiefs (still owned by the descendants of AFL founder Lamar Hunt) continue to regularly feature the original AFL logo on their jerseys as of 2026.

== Television ==
After the 1970 merger was officially completed, the combined league retained the services of CBS and NBC, who were the primary broadcasters of the NFL and the AFL, respectively. It was originally decided that CBS would televise all NFC teams (the "NFC package") and NBC would be responsible for all AFC teams (the "AFC package"). For interconference games, CBS would broadcast them if the visiting team was from the NFC, and NBC if the visitors were from the AFC. A deal was also signed for ABC to televise Monday Night Football (MNF), a marquee game regardless of the conference of the two opponents. The league would eventually carve out additional marquee packages such as Sunday Night Football (SNF) on ESPN in 1987 and Thursday Night Football (TNF) on NFL Network in 2006.

These packages shifted between broadcasters. The NFC package moved from CBS to Fox in 1994, CBS took over the AFC package from NBC in 1998, and then the league introduced "cross-flexing" in 2014 to assign CBS and Fox select games from the other conference. ESPN in 1987 originally only televised SNF for the second half of the season, TNT began televising SNF for the first half of the season in 1990, ESPN took over SNF throughout the entire season in 1998, and the entire package moved to NBC in 2006. ESPN then took over MNF from ABC in 2006 before letting its sister network to air select games (either simulcast or exclusive) in 2020. TNF games also were simulcast on CBS or NBC (2014–2017), Fox (2018–2021), and Amazon Prime Video (2017–2021) before Prime Video acquired exclusive rights to the package in 2022.

For the playoffs, it was originally decided in 1970 that the holder of the AFC package (then NBC, now CBS) would televise all AFC games, the holder of the NFC package (then CBS, now Fox) would televise all NFC games, and the Super Bowl would rotate annually between NBC for odd-numbered games and CBS for even-numbered games. ABC was added to the Super Bowl rotation in the 1984 season and then would start airing the two Wild Card games (regardless of conference) that were added when the playoffs expanded to 12 teams in 1990. ABC's postseason rights moved to NBC in 2006 when the former lost MNF and the latter won SNF. 2014 saw ESPN take away the rights to one Wild Card game from NBC, and NBC a Divisional playoff game from CBS in even years and Fox in odd years. The 2020 playoff expansion to a 14-team system then gave the league two extra games to offer short-term deals to interested broadcasters.
