= Horatio High School =

Location
- 1101 Metcalf Road; Horatio, Arkansas; United States
- Coordinates: 33°57′6″N 94°20′5″W

Information
- Motto: Every Learner ~ Every Dream ~ Every Day
- School district: Horatio School District
- NCES District ID: 0507860
- CEEB code: 041140
- NCES School ID: 050786000502
- Teaching staff: 50.78 (on FTE basis)
- Grades: 7-12
- Enrollment: 328 (2023–2024)
- Student to teacher ratio: 6.46
- Colors: Red, white, blue
- Athletics conference: 2A Region 7 (2012–14)
- Mascot: Lions
- Affiliations: Arkansas Activities Association
- Website: www.horatioschools.org

Horatio High School is comprehensive public junior/senior high school for seventh through twelfth grades students located in Horatio, Arkansas, United States. The southwest Arkansas school is administered by the Horatio School District.

== Academics ==
The assumed course of study for students follows the Smart Core curriculum developed by the Arkansas Department of Education (ADE), which requires students complete at least 22 units to graduate. Students engage in regular courses and exams and may take Advanced Placement (AP) coursework and exams with the opportunity for college credit.

== Extracurricular activities ==
The Horatio High School mascot is the lion with red, white and blue as its school colors.

The Horatio Lions compete in interscholastic competition in the 3A classification administered by the Arkansas Activities Association including baseball, basketball (boys/girls), football, and softball. The football team competes in the 5-3A conference and all other sports compete in the 7-3A conference.

The school's baseball team has captured five state baseball championships (1997, 2000, 2005, 2007, and 2016). In the 1997 State Championship game, Horatio and Hermitage combined for 34 runs scored, an Arkansas state record.

The 2012 boys' basketball team are the Nashville Tournament Champions, Wickes Tournament Champions.
