= Bengals–Browns rivalry =

National Football League cross-state rivalry in Ohio

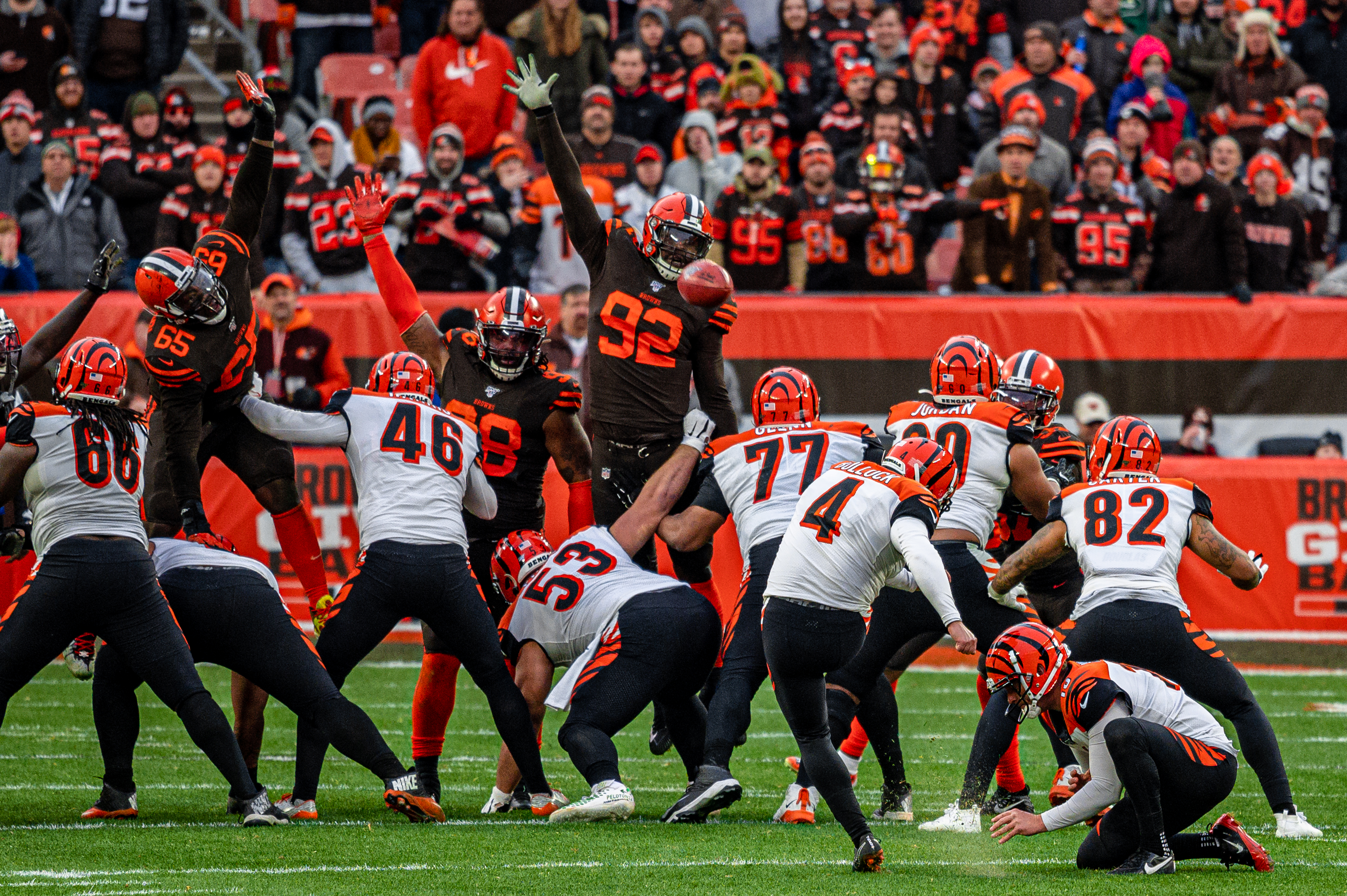
- Bengals and Browns face off during the 2019 season.

- Cincinnati Bengals Cleveland Browns
- Location: Cincinnati, Cleveland
- First meeting: October 11, 1970; Browns 30, Bengals 27
- Latest meeting: January 4, 2026; Browns 20, Bengals 18
- Next meeting: December 6, 2026
- Stadiums: Bengals: Paycor Stadium; Browns: Huntington Bank Field

Statistics
- Total meetings: 105
- All-time series: Bengals: 56–49
- Largest victory: Bengals: 37–3 (2015); Browns: 34–0 (1987)
- Most points scored: Bengals: 58 (2004); Browns: 51 (2007)
- Longest win streak: Bengals: 7 (2014–2017); Browns: 7 (1992–1995)
- Current win streak: Browns: 1 (2025–present)

The Bengals–Browns rivalry or Battle of Ohio is a National Football League (NFL) rivalry between the Cincinnati Bengals and Cleveland Browns.

Both teams are members of the American Football Conference (AFC) North Division, and play two games against each other annually. The Bengals and Browns first played in 1970. Previously, the Bengals were a part of the American Football League (AFL). After the AFL–NFL merger the Bengals and Browns were placed in the AFC Central Division, where they remained until the Browns suspended operations after the 1995 season after they moved to Baltimore, leading to the creation of the Baltimore Ravens. The Browns returned in 1999 via an expansion draft and were again placed in the AFC Central. When the NFL realigned divisions in 2002, both teams remained in the Central, which was renamed the AFC North division.

Geography and a shared heritage add to this rivalry. Cleveland (Northeast) and Cincinnati (Southwest) are on opposite corners of Ohio, and essentially split Ohio. Columbus serves as battleground territory for the rivalry, with the Browns dominating the fanbase North and East of the state capital. Dayton leans more towards the Bengals due to the close proximity between Cincinnati and Dayton, though the area does retain a strong following for the Browns. Southern Ohio leans more towards the Bengals, especially in the southeastern part of the state since the Bengals drafted Athens, Ohio native Joe Burrow, though the Upper Ohio Valley retains more of a lean towards the Browns. In most areas, the two teams also share with a fellow AFC North rival, the Pittsburgh Steelers, in popularity, though the Browns and Bengals dominate Greater Cleveland and Greater Cincinnati, respectively.

Both teams have direct connections to Paul Brown, who was both the former Hall of Fame head coach and namesake of the Browns and as well the founder of the Bengals franchise in the AFL in 1967, 5 years after he was fired from the Browns. The colors of both teams are similar, with the main color being orange.

The Bengals lead the overall series, 56–49. The two teams have not met in the playoffs.

== History ==
=== Early history ===
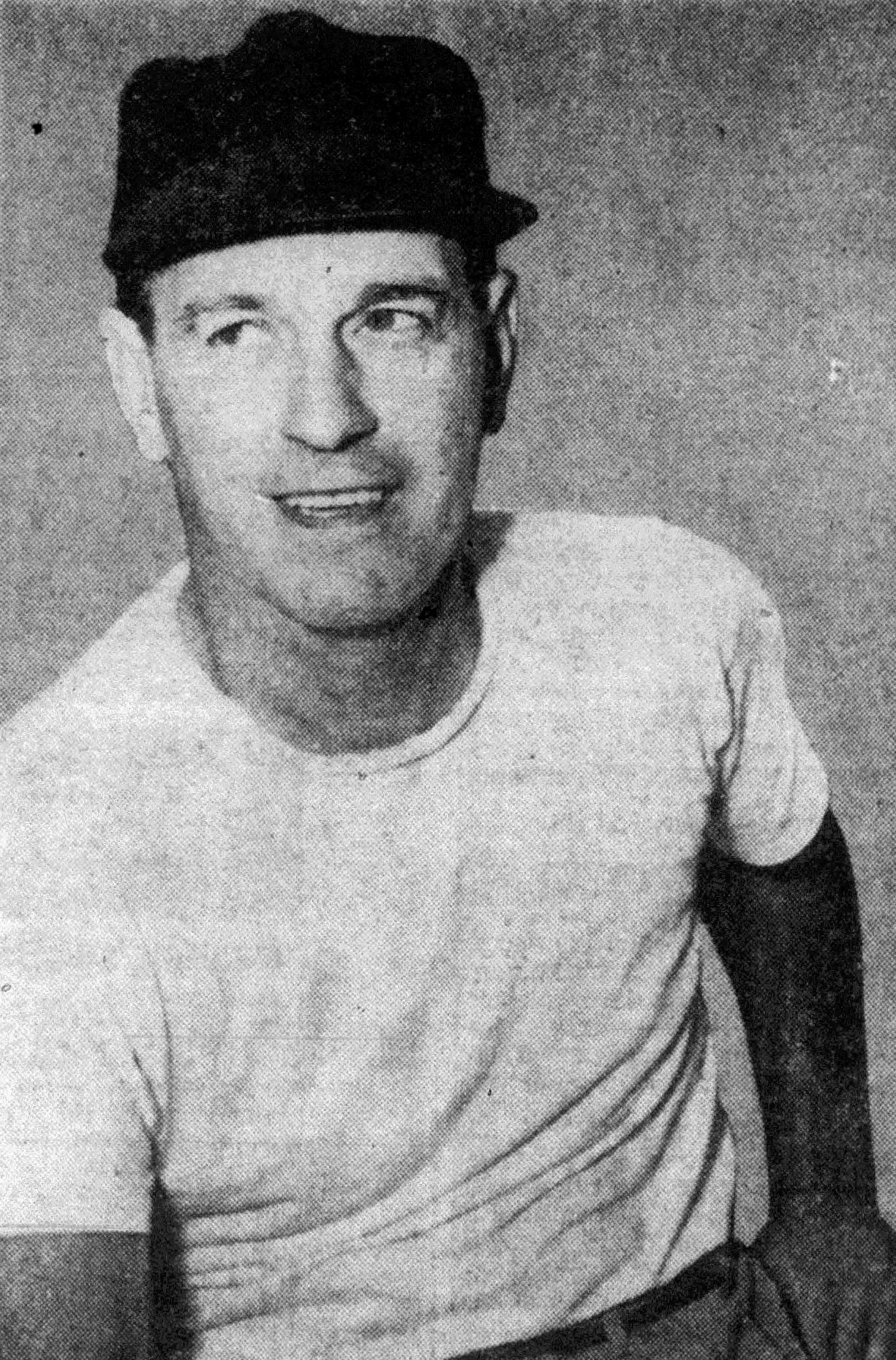
Paul Brown was the co-founder and inaugural head coach of the Cleveland Browns, a team named in his honor. He led the Browns to seven NFL championship games, winning in three of them. However, conflicts with team owner Art Modell resulted in his dismissal in 1963. Years later, Brown founded the Cincinnati Bengals and served as their inaugural head coach, maintaining ownership of the team until his death in 1991.

The Browns were founded in 1946 as a member of the All-America Football Conference (AAFC), and were named after their head coach, Paul Brown.

The Browns dominated the AAFC in its four years of existence, winning all four championships, and joined the NFL in 1950, playing in the next six NFL Championship Games for and winning three of them.

In 1963, Brown was fired by new team owner Art Modell, and subsequently went on to found the Bengals, who played their first AFL season in 1968. Two years later, after the AFL-NFL merger, both the Bengals and the Browns were placed in the AFC Central, and thus met twice every season: fueled by the hatred between Brown and Modell, a rivalry was born.

=== 1970–1979: The first meetings ===
In the first regular-season matchup between the two teams, the Browns beat the Bengals 30–27. It was an important win for the Browns, who were chastised for losing a preseason game to Cincinnati. Running backs Leroy Kelly and Bo Scott combined for 236 yards, and a fired up defense set the early tone when defensive tackle Walter Johnson sacked Bengals quarterback Virgil Carter for a safety. However, the Bengals got the last laugh that season, beating the Browns in their first meeting in Cincinnati, 14–10. This win helped propel the Bengals, who won their final seven games, to win the AFC Central by one game over the Browns.

Each team had limited success in the 1970s, with the Bengals making three playoff appearances and the Browns making two; this can be partially attributed to a fellow division rival, the Pittsburgh Steelers, being the dominant team in the NFL during this time. Neither team won a playoff game in the decade. The teams split the 20 games during the 1970s, each winning 10.

=== 1980–1990: Playoff contenders ===
Both teams had several playoff runs throughout the 1980s.

The Bengals appeared in two Super Bowls during the decade (XVI and XXIII), losing both to the San Francisco 49ers. The Browns played in three AFC Championship games during the decade, but lost all of them to the Denver Broncos.

Prior to the 1980 season, the Bengals hired former Browns head coach Forrest Gregg. The Browns beat Gregg and the Bengals in both meetings that year, including a division-clinching 27–24 win in Cincinnati. In the season ending clinching game, Thom Darden used a forearm tackle to the face of Pat McInally. McInally was unconscious for about 10 minutes and left the field on a stretcher, but he returned in the second half to make three receptions for 86 yards, including a game-tying touchdown. The hit and McInally's recovery are a legendary part of the intrastate rivalry.

Because of the 1982 NFL players strike, the game in Cleveland that season was cancelled. The Bengals won the only meeting of the year in Cincinnati, 23–10: this marks the only season to date in which the Browns and Bengals did not meet twice.

On December 14, 1986, the Browns routed the Bengals 34–3 at Riverfront Stadium to clinch the AFC Central division title. The Browns and Bengals battled for the division title throughout the late 1980s, with the Browns winning the AFC Central title in 1986, 1987, and 1989; the Bengals won the division in 1988 and 1990.

On December 10, 1989, during a Bengals home game against the Seattle Seahawks, Bengals fans booed and threw snowballs and various other objects onto the field, at Seahawks players and officials, and at game officials in response to questionable calls. The Seahawks were deep in their own territory, and citing safety concerns, refused to continue play until the field was cleared. Bengals head coach Sam Wyche got on the stadium's public address system and told the fans: "Will the next person that sees anybody throw anything onto this field, point them out, and get them out of here. You don't live in Cleveland, you live in Cincinnati!"

Paul Brown owned the Bengals until his death in August 1991: at the time, his Bengals held a 22–19 record against his former team.

=== 1991–1995: Browns' dominance and move ===
Under head coach Bill Belichick, the Browns dominated the series during these years, going 8–2, including a seven-game winning streak from 1992 to 1995.

On September 4, 1994, the teams opened the season at Riverfront Stadium. The Browns won the game, 28–20, highlighted by an Eric Metcalf 94-yard punt return for a touchdown, a Browns franchise record. The game featured the first successful two-point conversion in NFL history, when Cleveland punter Tom Tupa ran into the end zone on a fake extra point attempt.

On October 29, 1995, the Browns defeated the Bengals 29–26 in overtime. Browns kicker Matt Stover kicked five field-goals for the Browns including the overtime game-winner.

On November 6, 1995, Modell announced his intention to relocate the Browns to Baltimore following the season: most of the team's sponsors pulled their support in response, leaving Cleveland Municipal Stadium devoid of advertising during the team's final weeks.

The Browns defeated the Bengals in the final game played at Cleveland Municipal Stadium, 26–10, in the Browns' only win following the announcement of the move.

=== 1999–2010: Browns' return and struggles for both teams ===
The Browns returned to the NFL as an expansion franchise in 1999. Both teams struggled throughout the next decade. The Browns made a playoff appearance in 2002, while the Bengals made it to the playoffs in 2005 and 2009, although neither team won a playoff game during this time. Both teams had years in which they finished with the worst record in the NFL (the Browns in 1999 and the Bengals in 2002), and thus were awarded the top pick in the following year's draft.

On October 10, the teams met for the first time since the Browns' return. The Bengals won the game at the new Cleveland Browns Stadium, 18–17. Rookie quarterback Akili Smith led the Bengals on a 12-play touchdown drive in the final 2:04 to deny the Browns their first win. In that game, Browns kicker Phil Dawson scored a rushing touchdown on a fake field goal play. On December 12, the Bengals defeated the Browns 44–28 in the last game at Riverfront Stadium (at the time renamed Cinergy Field).

The Browns and Bengals opened Paul Brown Stadium on September 10, 2000, a 24–7 Browns' win.

On December 28, 2003 in Cincinnati, the Browns defeated the Bengals 22–14, to knock the Bengals out of playoff contention in the final regular season game.

On November 28, 2004 in Cincinnati, the Bengals defeated the Browns 58–48. The 106 combined points marked the second highest scoring game in NFL history (only behind a 1966 game in which the Washington Redskins defeated the New York Giants 72–41, a total of 113 points). The game saw Bengals running back Rudi Johnson rush for 202 yards and Browns QB Kelly Holcomb pass for 413 yards and five touchdowns. After that game, Browns' head coach Butch Davis resigned amid a long losing streak and disappointing 4–12 season.

The two teams were involved in another very high scoring game, on September 16, 2007, in Cleveland. This time, the Browns were on the winning end, 51–45. The 96 point total is the 11th-highest scoring total in NFL history. In this game, Browns quarterback Derek Anderson passed for 328 yards and 5 touchdowns, while running back Jamal Lewis rushed for 216 yards. On the other side, Bengals quarterback Carson Palmer passed for 401 yards and six touchdowns. Chad Johnson, who caught two of the touchdown passes, had 209 yards receiving.

The Bengals won the rematch that year, 19–14, in Cincinnati. The Browns entered that game at 9–5 and controlled their own playoff destiny. However, Anderson threw four interceptions in the game, leading to most of the Bengals' points. Despite winning their final game and finishing 10–6, the Browns missed the playoffs due to AFC tiebreakers.

On December 29, 2008, the Bengals defeated the Browns 14–0 in Cleveland. This win gave the Bengals a 36–35 lead in the overall series, a lead the Bengals have not yet relinquished.

The Bengals swept the Browns in the 2009 season, while also sweeping the rest of the AFC North en route to a division title. This is the Bengals' first division sweep in franchise history.

=== 2011–2019: The Andy Dalton era ===
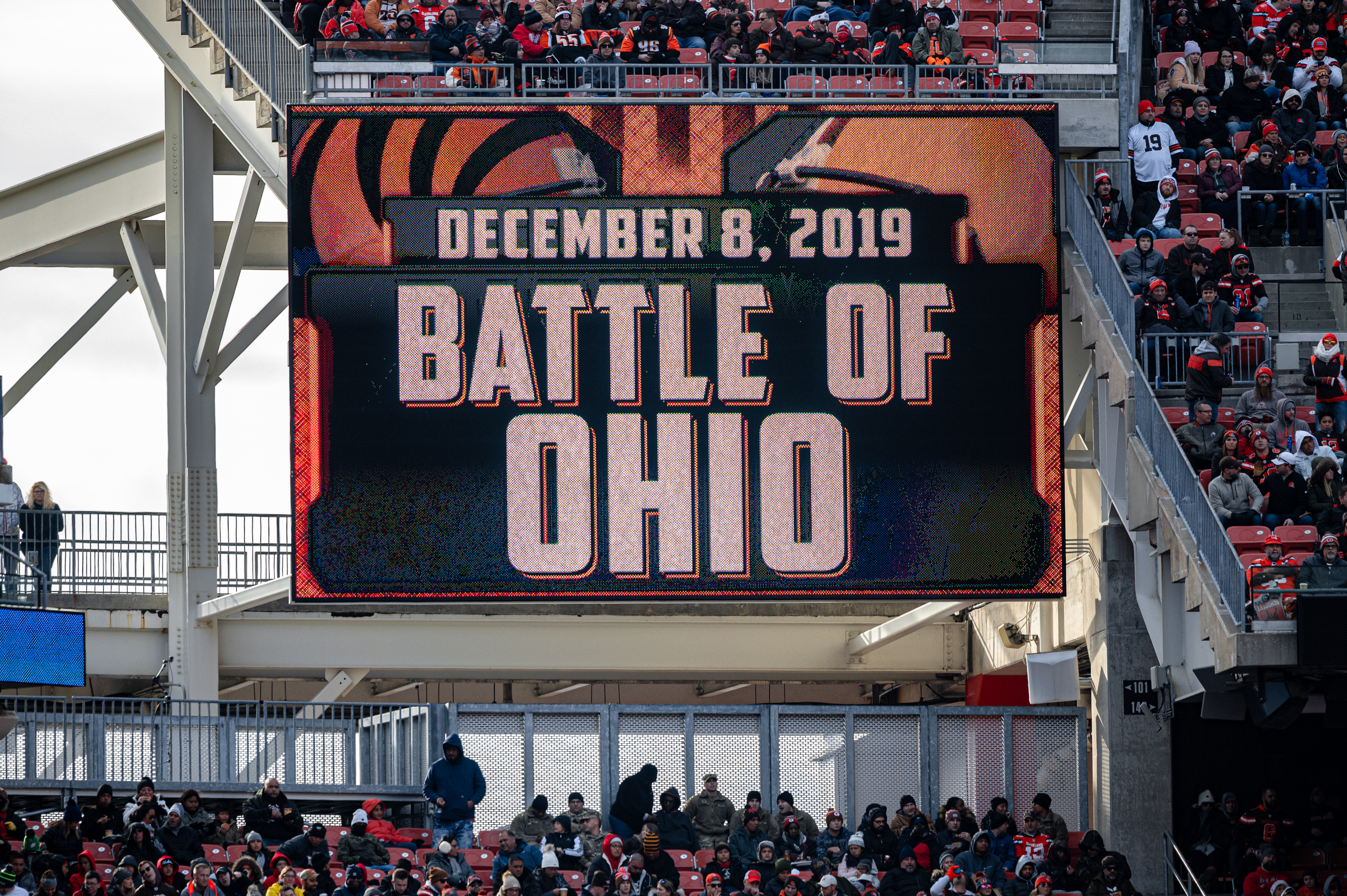
Battle of Ohio

In the 2011 NFL draft, the Bengals took wide receiver A. J. Green and quarterback Andy Dalton with their first two picks. Dalton made his first career start as a rookie in Cleveland, a 27–17 Bengals win, the first of many dominating performances. Dalton has an 11–4 record against the Browns, passing for 27 touchdowns – seven of which went to Green – against 11 interceptions.

One exception to Dalton's dominance in the rivalry occurred on November 6, 2014, where the Browns defeated the Bengals 24–3 in Cincinnati. Dalton posted a 2.0 quarterback rating, the worst game of his career.

The Bengals won seven meetings in a row from 2014 to 2017 by a combined score of 213–63. The Bengals scored at least 30 points in six of the seven games, while the Browns have scored 17 or fewer points in each game.

In 2018, the Browns fired head coach Hue Jackson; Jackson had a 3–36–1 record, including the Browns finishing 0–16 in 2017. Cincinnati hired Jackson as special assistant to head coach, Marvin Lewis, less than a month later.

In their first meeting of 2018, Browns rookie quarterback Baker Mayfield, making his eighth career start and his first start against the Bengals in week 12, passed for four touchdowns and led the Browns to a 35–20 win in Cincinnati. In his second career start against the Bengals, Mayfield continued his dominance by throwing for 284 yards and three touchdowns in a Browns 26–18 victory in week 16, and also taunted Jackson by staring him down along the sideline.

=== 2020–present ===
The Browns dominated the early 2020s under head coach Kevin Stefanski, winning six of the seven meetings in the decade.

On October 25, 2020, Browns quarterback Baker Mayfield and Bengals quarterback Joe Burrow combined for an NFL record five go-ahead touchdown passes in the fourth quarter as the Browns won 37–34.

== Season-by-season results ==
Cincinnati Bengals vs. Cleveland Browns Season-by-Season Results
1970s (Tie, 10–10)

Season	Season series	at Cincinnati Bengals	at Cleveland Browns	Overall series	Notes
1970	Tie 1–1	Bengals; 14–10	Browns; 30–27	Tie; 1–1	As a result of the AFL–NFL merge, the Bengals and Browns are placed in the AFC Central. Paul Brown, a co-founder and first coach of the Cleveland Browns, named in his honor, was fired and later became the co-founder and first coach of the Cincinnati Bengals. In Cleveland, Brown refused to shake Browns HC Blanton Collier's hand after the game.
1971	Browns 2–0	Browns; 27–24	Browns; 31–27	Browns; 3–1	
1972	Browns 2–0	Browns; 27–24	Browns; 27–6	Browns; 5–1	
1973	Tie, 1–1	Bengals; 34–17	Browns; 17–10	Browns; 6–2	
1974	Bengals 2–0	Bengals; 33–7	Bengals; 34–24	Browns; 6–4	
1975	Tie 1–1	Bengals; 24–17	Browns; 35–23	Browns; 7–5	Browns snapped an 11-game losing streak and earned their first win of the season after a 0–9 start.
1976	Bengals 2–0	Bengals; 21–6	Bengals; 45–24	Tie; 7–7	
1977	Tie 1–1	Browns; 13–3	Bengals; 10–7	Tie; 8–8	
1978	Tie 1–1	Bengals; 48–16	Browns; 13–10 (OT)	Tie; 9–9	
1979	Tie 1–1	Bengals; 16–12	Browns; 28–27	Tie; 10–10	

1980s (Bengals, 10–9)

Season	Season series	at Cincinnati Bengals	at Cleveland Browns	Overall series	Notes
1980	Browns 2–0	Browns; 27–24	Browns; 31–7	Browns; 12–10	Bengals hire former Browns head coach Forrest Gregg.
1981	Tie 1–1	Browns; 20–17	Bengals; 41–21	Browns; 13–11	Bengals lose Super Bowl XVI.
1982	Bengals 1–0	Bengals; 23–10	canceled	Browns; 13–12	Due to the 1982 NFL player strike, the game scheduled in Cleveland was canceled.
1983	Tie, 1–1	Bengals; 28–21	Browns; 17–7	Browns; 14–13	
1984	Bengals 2–0	Bengals; 12–9	Bengals; 20–17 (OT)	Bengals; 15–14	In Cincinnati, Browns' K Steve Cox kicked a 60–yard field goal, setting a franchise record for their longest field goal made.
1985	Tie 1–1	Bengals; 27–10	Browns; 24–6	Bengals; 16–15	
1986	Tie 1–1	Browns; 34–3	Bengals; 30–13	Bengals; 17–16	
1987	Browns 2–0	Browns; 34–0	Browns; 38–24	Browns; 18–17	In Cincinnati, Browns record their largest victory over the Bengals with a 34–point differential.
1988	Tie 1–1	Bengals; 24–17	Browns; 23–16	Browns; 19–18	Bengals lose Super Bowl XXIII.
1989	Bengals 2–0	Bengals; 21–14	Bengals; 21–0	Bengals; 20–19	

1990s (Browns, 8–6)

Season	Season series	at Cincinnati Bengals	at Cleveland Browns	Overall series	Notes
1990	Bengals 2–0	Bengals; 21–14	Bengals; 34–13	Bengals; 22–19	
1991	Tie 1–1	Bengals; 23–21	Browns; 14–13	Bengals; 23–20	Bengals get their first win of the season after an 0–8 start.
1992	Tie 1–1	Bengals; 30–10	Browns; 37–21	Bengals; 24–21	
1993	Browns 2–0	Browns; 28–17	Browns; 27–14	Bengals; 24–23	
1994	Browns 2–0	Browns; 28–20	Browns; 37–13	Browns; 25–24	In Cincinnati, Browns' Eric Metcalf scored a 92-yard punt return touchdown, setting a franchise record for their longest punt return.
1995	Browns 2–0	Browns; 29–26 (OT)	Browns; 26–10	Browns; 27–24	Last season until the 1999 season the Bengals faced the Browns, as they would controversially relocated to Baltimore and became the Baltimore Ravens. Game in Cleveland was the Browns’ final home game before the move.
No games from 1996-1998 as the Browns suspended operations
1999	Bengals 2–0	Bengals; 44–28	Bengals; 18–17	Browns; 27–26	Browns return to the NFL and open Cleveland Browns Stadium (now known as Huntington Bank Field). In Cleveland, rookie Bengals QB Akili Smith threw a game-winning touchdown pass with nine seconds remaining.

2000s (Bengals, 12–8)

Season	Season series	at Cincinnati Bengals	at Cleveland Browns	Overall series	Notes
2000	Tie 1–1	Browns; 24–7	Bengals; 12–3	Browns; 28–27	Bengals open Paul Brown Stadium (now known as Paycor Stadium).
2001	Tie 1–1	Bengals; 24–14	Browns; 18–0	Browns; 29–28	
2002	Browns 2–0	Browns; 27–20	Browns; 20–7	Browns; 31–28	
2003	Tie 1–1	Browns; 22–14	Bengals; 21–14	Browns; 32–29	Browns win eliminates the Bengals from playoff contention.
2004	Tie 1–1	Bengals; 58–48	Browns; 34–17	Browns; 33–30	In Cincinnati, Bengals score their most points in a game against the Browns. The final score also marked the second-highest combined point total in NFL history (106 points).
2005	Bengals 2–0	Bengals; 23–20	Bengals; 27–13	Browns; 33–32	
2006	Bengals 2–0	Bengals; 34–17	Bengals; 30–0	Bengals; 34–33	
2007	Tie 1–1	Bengals; 19–14	Browns; 51–45	Bengals; 35–34	In Cleveland, Browns score their most points in a game against the Bengals. Additionally, the game's final score was the eleventh-highest-scoring game in NFL history (96 points). Bengals' win prevented the Browns from clinching a playoff berth.
2008	Tie 1–1	Browns; 20–12	Bengals; 14–0	Bengals; 36–35	
2009	Bengals 2–0	Bengals; 16–7	Bengals; 23–20 (OT)	Bengals; 38–35	Bengals win all of their division games for the first time in franchise history.

2010s (Bengals, 13–7)

Season	Season series	at Cincinnati Bengals	at Cleveland Browns	Overall series	Notes
2010	Tie 1–1	Bengals; 19–17	Browns; 23–20	Bengals; 39–36	Bengals' win ended a 10-game losing streak.
2011	Bengals 2–0	Bengals; 23–20	Bengals; 27–17	Bengals; 41–36	In Cleveland, Bengals QB Andy Dalton makes his first career start.
2012	Tie 1–1	Bengals; 34–27	Browns; 34–24	Bengals; 42–37	
2013	Tie 1–1	Bengals; 41–20	Browns; 17–6	Bengals; 43–38	In Cincinnati, Bengals scored 31 points in the second quarter, setting a franchise record for their most points in a quarter.
2014	Tie 1–1	Browns; 24–3	Bengals; 30–0	Bengals; 44–39	
2015	Bengals 2–0	Bengals; 31–10	Bengals; 37–3	Bengals; 46–39	In Cleveland, Bengals record their largest victory over the Browns with a 34–point differential.
2016	Bengals 2–0	Bengals; 31–17	Bengals; 23–10	Bengals; 48–39	
2017	Bengals 2–0	Bengals; 30–16	Bengals; 31–7	Bengals; 50–39	Browns complete the second 0–16 season in NFL history.
2018	Browns 2–0	Browns; 35–20	Browns; 26–18	Bengals; 50–41	Bengals hired recently fired and former Browns head coach Hue Jackson as a special assistant to head coach Marvin Lewis. With their win in Cincinnati, the Browns snapped their 25-game road losing streak. Browns sweep the Bengals for the first time since the 2002 season.
2019	Tie 1–1	Bengals; 33–23	Browns; 27–19	Bengals; 51–42	

2020s (Browns, 7–5)

Season	Season series	at Cincinnati Bengals	at Cleveland Browns	Overall series	Notes
2020	Browns 2–0	Browns; 37–34	Browns; 35–30	Bengals; 51–44	In Cincinnati, both teams combined for five go-ahead touchdown passes, setting an NFL record.
2021	Browns 2–0	Browns; 41–16	Browns; 21–16	Bengals; 51–46	Bengals lose Super Bowl LVI.
2022	Tie 1–1	Bengals; 23–10	Browns; 32–13	Bengals; 52–47	
2023	Tie 1–1	Bengals; 31–14	Browns; 24–3	Bengals; 53–48	Jeff Driskel became the first quarterback to start for both teams.
2024	Bengals 2–0	Bengals; 24–6	Bengals; 21–14	Bengals; 55–48	
2025	Tie 1–1	Browns; 20–18	Bengals; 17–16	Bengals; 56–49	In Cincinnati, Myles Garrett set the NFL single-season sack record with 23 sacks.
2026		January 9/10	December 6	Bengals; 56–49	

Summary of Results

Season	Season series	at Cincinnati Bengals	at Cleveland Browns	Notes
Regular Season	Bengals 56–49	Bengals 34–19	Browns 30–22	

== See also ==
- National Football League rivalries
- AFC North
- Ohio Cup (Guardians–Reds)
