= Steve Cox (American football) =

American football player (born 1958)

No. 15, 12
- Position: Punter / Kicker

Personal information
- Born: May 11, 1958 (age 68); Shreveport, Louisiana, U.S.
- Listed height: 6 ft 4 in (1.93 m)
- Listed weight: 195 lb (88 kg)

Career information
- High school: Charleston (AR)
- College: Arkansas
- NFL draft: 1981: 5th round, 134th overall pick

Career history
- Cleveland Browns (1981–1984); Washington Redskins (1985–1988)

Awards and highlights
- Super Bowl champion (XXII); First-team All-SWC (1980)

Career NFL statistics
- Punts: 386
- Punting yards: 16,212
- Punting average: 42.0
- Stats at Pro Football Reference

Stephen Everett Cox (born May 11, 1958) is an American former professional football player who was a punter and placekicker in the National Football League (NFL). He played college football for the Arkansas Razorbacks. Cox was selected by the Cleveland Browns in the fifth round of the 1981 NFL draft and played for them for four seasons. He played four more seasons for the Washington Redskins. Cox was one of the last straight-ahead style placekickers in the National Football League (NFL).

== Early life ==
Cox was born to Ruby and Joe Cox in Shreveport, Louisiana, but the family moved to Charleston, Arkansas, when he was young. He practiced punting in his backyard and at the high school football field with his father, where he was invited to try out for the high school team. He grew up an Arkansas Razorbacks fan but was told he would not play for two years while All-American Steve Little kicked for the Razorbacks. Cox instead attended the University of Tulsa in 1976, making the 1976 Tulsa Golden Hurricane football team. Tulsa traveled to Fayetteville, Arkansas, and beat the #12 Razorbacks 9-3 behind Cox's three field goals. Following the 1977 season Cox transferred to the University of Arkansas. After sitting out 1978 due to NCAA transfer rules, Cox added the punting job to his kicking duties. Steve was named All-Southwest Conference in 1979 and 1980, and was also named an All-American in 1980 by the UPI, the Sporting News, College & Pro Football Newsweekly, and Football News after leading the nation in punting by averaging 46.5 yards per punt.

== NFL career ==
Though primarily a punter and kickoff specialist, Cox was also used for long field goal attempts. Cox underwent brain surgery in 1983. On October 21, 1984, Cox kicked a 60-yard field goal for the Cleveland Browns in a game against Cincinnati. The kick was the second-longest field goal at the time (behind Tom Dempsey's then-record kick). Cox's kick remains one of only 26 field goals of 60 yards or more in NFL history and one of only two which was done with the straight-ahead style (the other being Tom Dempsey). Cox was cut by the Browns the following year.

In summer 1985, Cox signed with the Washington Redskins. Cox averaged 42 yards per punt for Washington, and earned a Super Bowl ring in Super Bowl XXII. Cox punted four times and kicked off seven times for the Redskins in the game.

== Personal life ==
He married Virginia Rainwater in 1980; the couple has two adult children. After football, Cox worked in banking in Jonesboro, Arkansas. He now serves as a partner at Rainwater & Cox, which manages real estate investments. Cox was inducted into the Arkansas Sports Hall of Fame in 2004. Governor of Arkansas Asa Hutchinson appointed Cox to the University of Arkansas Board of Trustees in March 2018.
