= Winthrop, Arkansas =

- City
- Location in Little River County, Arkansas

- Location in Arkansas Location in the United States
- Coordinates: 33°49′51″N 94°21′15″W
- Country: United States
- State: Arkansas
- County: Little River

Area
  - Total: 1.04 sq mi (2.69 km^{2})
  - Land: 1.04 sq mi (2.69 km^{2})
  - Water: 0 sq mi (0.00 km^{2})
- Elevation: 341 ft (104 m)

Population (2020)
  - Total: 116
  - Estimate (2025): 115 ▼
  - Density: 111.5/sq mi (43.06/km^{2})
- Time zone: UTC-6 (Central (CST))
  - Summer (DST): UTC-5 (CDT)
- ZIP codes: 71866
- Area code: 870
- FIPS code: 05-76250
- GNIS feature ID: 2405777

Winthrop is a city in Little River County, Arkansas, United States. As of the 2020 census, Winthrop had a population of 116.

== Geography ==
Winthrop is located in northwestern Little River County 20 miles (32 km) northwest of Ashdown, the county seat, and 7 miles (11 km) east of the Oklahoma border.

According to the United States Census Bureau, the city has a total area of 1.0 square mile (2.7 km^{2}), all land.

== Demographics ==
Historical population
Census	Pop.	Note	%±
1920	250		—
1930	331		32.4%
1940	336		1.5%
1950	284		−15.5%
1960	225		−20.8%
1970	240		6.7%
1980	238		−0.8%
1990	227		−4.6%
2000	186		−18.1%
2010	192		3.2%
2020	116		−39.6%
2025 (est.)	115	▼	−0.9%
U.S. Decennial Census

As of the census of 2000, there were 186 people, 71 households, and 52 families residing in the city. The population density was 173.5 inhabitants per square mile (67.0/km^{2}). There were 83 housing units at an average density of 77.4 units per square mile (29.9 units/km^{2}). The racial makeup of the city was 90.86% White, 2.69% Black or African American, 2.69% Native American, 0.54% from other races, and 3.23% from two or more races. 2.15% of the population were Hispanic or Latino of any race.

There were 71 households, out of which 32.4% had children under the age of 18 living with them, 69.0% were married couples living together, 2.8% had a female householder with no husband present, and 25.4% were non-families. 25.4% of all households were made up of individuals, and 14.1% had someone living alone who was 65 years of age or older. The average household size was 2.62 and the average family size was 3.13.

In the city, the population was spread out, with 28.0% under the age of 18, 8.6% from 18 to 24, 29.0% from 25 to 44, 24.2% from 45 to 64, and 10.2% who were 65 years of age or older. The median age was 32 years. For every 100 females, there were 95.8 males. For every 100 females age 18 and over, there were 100.0 males.

The median income for a household in the city was $25,313, and the median income for a family was $31,094. Males had a median income of $22,188 versus $17,917 for females. The per capita income for the city was $13,474. About 14.3% of families and 16.7% of the population were below the poverty line, including 15.6% of those under the age of eighteen and 9.1% of those 65 or over.

== Education ==
The Horatio School District serves Winthrop. On July 1, 1992, the Winthrop School District consolidated into the Horatio district.

== Notable person ==
- Marshall Wright, Democratic member of the Arkansas House of Representatives for St. Francis County in eastern Arkansas, formerly resided in Winthrop.
