= Charleston School District =

School district in Arkansas, United States

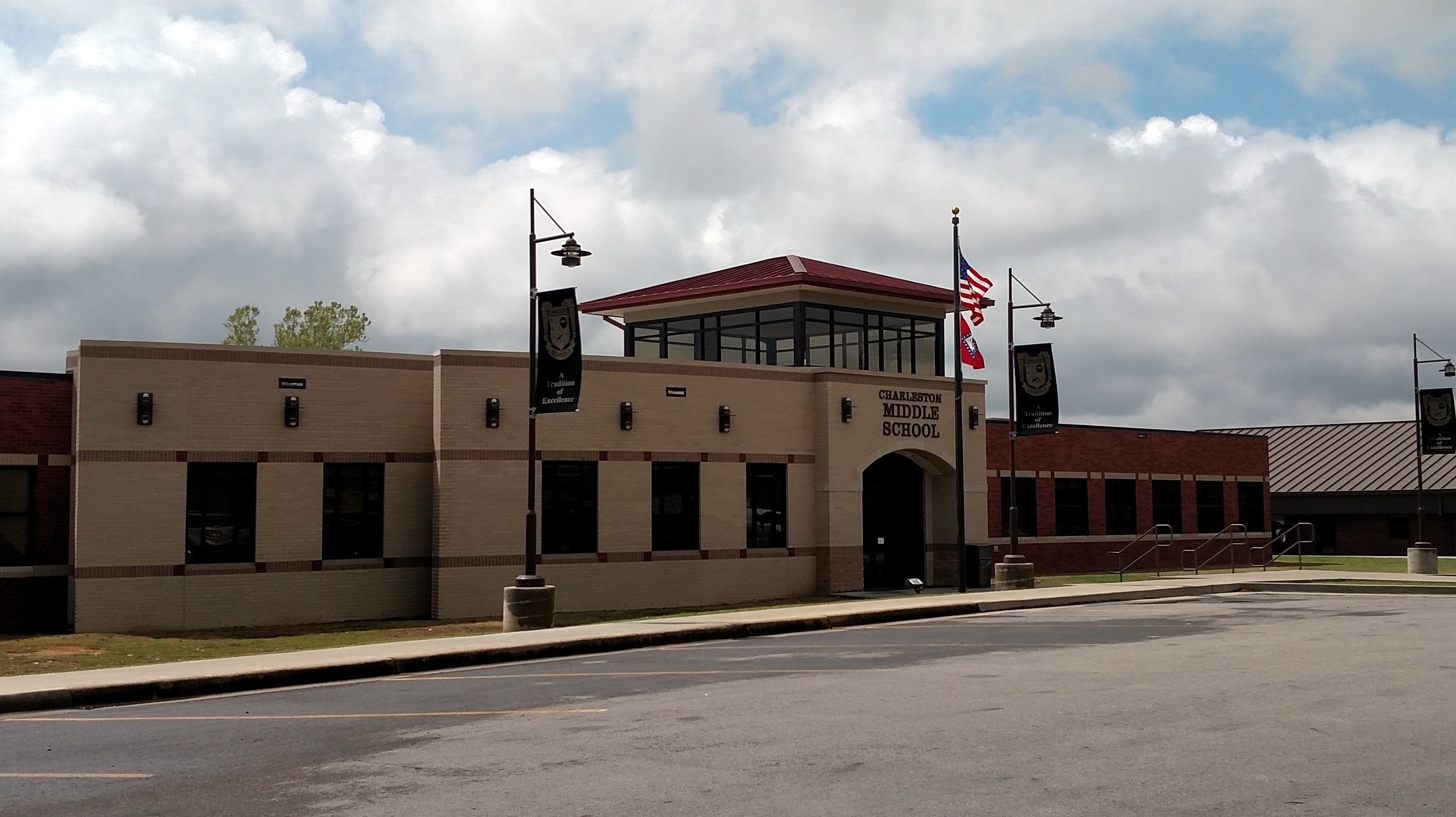

Address
- 125 West Main Street Charleston, Arkansas, 72933; United States

District information
- Type: Public
- Grades: PreK–12
- NCES District ID: 0504200

Students and staff
- Students: 853
- Teachers: 92.2
- Staff: 66.49
- Student–teacher ratio: 9.25

Other information
- Website: tigers.wsc.k12.ar.us

Charleston School District is a school district in Franklin County, Arkansas.

In 1954, Charleston School District was the first school district in the former Confederate States to implement school integration in response to Brown v. Board of Education. On July 27, 1954, the school board, including President Howard Madison Orsburn, George Hairston, Archibald Schaffer, Herbert Shumate, and Homer Keith, unanimously voted to "disband the Colored School and admit the Colored children into the grade and high school when classes open for the fall semester." Accordingly, when the schools opened on August 23, 11 black children were in attendance alongside 480 whites. School Superintendent Woodie Haynes made an agreement with the local press not to cover the event, and stonewalled any outside reporters that asked questions. The decision to integrate had financial benefits, as the district had been paying a considerable sum to transport black high school students to Fort Smith, and were able to close the old Rosenwald school.

Charleston School District was designated as the Charleston National Commemorative Site in 1998.

== Schools ==
The District includes:

- Charleston Elementary School
- Charleston Middle School
- Charleston High School
