= Ohio Cup =

Major League Baseball cross-state rivalry and trophy in Ohio

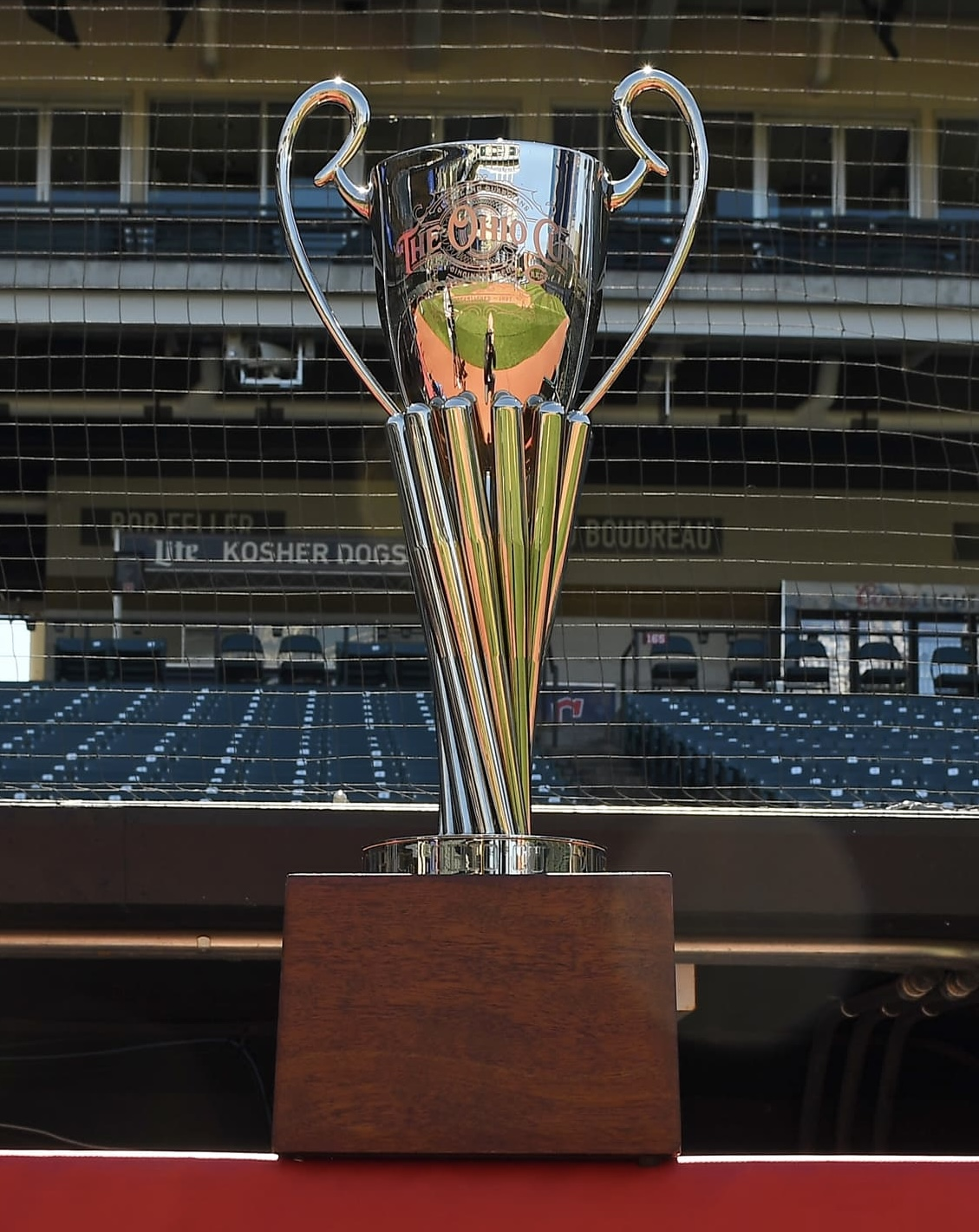

- Cincinnati Reds Cleveland Guardians
- Location: Ohio
- First meeting: June 16, 1997; Jacobs Field, Cleveland; Reds 4, Indians 1
- Latest meeting: July 29, 2026; Great American Ball Park, Cincinnati; Guardians 6, Reds 1
- Next meeting: July 16, 2027; Great American Ball Park, Cincinnati
- Stadiums: Reds: Great American Ball Park; Guardians: Progressive Field
- Trophy: Guardians 8 Reds 5 Tie 6 (all retained by the Guardians)

Statistics
- Total meetings: 147
- Most wins: Guardians
- Regular season series: Guardians, 81–66 (.551)
- Largest victory: Reds, 14–5 (July 8, 2000); Indians, 19–4 (July 11, 2018)
- Longest win streak: Reds, 5 (May 16–June 10, 2025); Indians, 6 (June 27, 2010–July 2, 2011; July 18, 2015–May 19, 2016)
- Current win streak: Guardians, 1

Locations of the Cincinnati Reds and Cleveland Guardians

The Ohio Cup, also known as the Battle of Ohio and the Buckeye Series, is an annual interleague rivalry series between the two Major League Baseball (MLB) teams from the U.S. state of Ohio: the Cincinnati Reds of the National League (NL) and the Cleveland Guardians (formerly Indians) of the American League (AL). The series name comes from the trophy for which the teams play. The trophy was first introduced in 1989 for an annual pre-season exhibition game between the two teams, and later reintroduced in 2008. The cup is awarded to the team that wins the most games against the other in a particular season. In the event of a tie, the team holding the trophy from the previous season retains it. The Guardians currently hold the trophy by virtue of winning the 2026 season series.

Prior to the introduction of interleague play, the current Cincinnati and Cleveland franchises had only met in spring training or other exhibition games. Because the two teams play in opposite leagues, the only chance to meet at that time was in the World Series. The Ohio Cup series was created in 1989 and was an exhibition game between the two teams played in the state capital of Columbus at Cooper Stadium just prior to the start of the season. A total of eight Ohio Cup games were played, from 1989 to 1996, with the Indians winning six. The games in Columbus were typically well-attended, with attendance topping the stadium's 15,000-seat capacity in all games except one.

The regular-season series began in 1997 with the start of interleague play and has been played every season since except 2002. The teams have typically played either four or six games per season, with two or three in each ballpark. Since 2025, this has been fixed at six meetings per year. The Guardians lead the regular-season series 81–66 through the 2026 season.

== History ==
Cincinnati and Cleveland both have long histories in professional baseball and the current Cincinnati Reds and Cleveland Guardians franchises are among the oldest in Major League Baseball. The original Cincinnati Red Stockings, founded in 1869, were the first professional baseball team, and they were soon followed by other professional teams, including one in Cleveland known as Forest City, founded that same year. The two teams played in Cleveland on July 2, 1869, a 25–6 win for the Red Stockings. The two cities competed directly again during the 1879 season as members of the National League. An earlier Reds franchise, a charter member of the NL, met the Cleveland Blues twelve times that year, with the Reds winning eight games and the Blues winning four. After that season, the Reds disbanded while the Blues continued until 1884.

The two cities resumed competition with each other in the latter years of the American Association after the current Cincinnati Reds franchise was founded in 1882 as a charter member of the AA, and the Cleveland Spiders, first known as the Blues or Forest Citys, formed in 1887. The first American Association meeting between Cleveland and Cincinnati was played at League Park in Cincinnati, a 16–6 win for the Red Stockings. During their two seasons together in the AA, Cincinnati won 21 games with Cleveland taking 13.

The teams met again two years later, as members of the National League, after Cleveland joined the NL in 1889 and Cincinnati in 1890. The game was played at National League Park in Cleveland, a 3–2 Spiders win. The following season, the Spiders hosted the Reds in the very first game played at League Park in Cleveland, won by the Spiders 12–3 behind winning pitcher Cy Young. The series continued until 1899, when the Spiders were one of four teams contracted by the NL at the end of the season. Over the 10 seasons both were part of the National League, the Reds and Spiders played 138 times, with Cincinnati winning 75, Cleveland 60, and three ties.

=== Modern era ===
The Spiders were replaced in Cleveland by a minor league team called the Lake Shores in the American League for the 1900 season. The AL declared itself a major league for the 1901 season with the Cleveland franchise, then called the Blues, as a charter member. The team was later called the Bronchos and Naps before being named the Indians in 1915 and Guardians in 2022. Because the two teams are part of different leagues, however, the only chance for them to meet prior to the introduction of Interleague Play in 1997 was in exhibition games or in the World Series. The Indians and Reds came close to meeting on three occasions, first when Cincinnati won the tainted 1919 World Series with Cleveland 3 1/2 games back of the Chicago White Sox in the AL. The following season, the Indians won the World Series while the Reds finished 10 1/2 games back of the Brooklyn Robins and third in the NL. In 1940, the Reds again won the World Series while the Indians finished one game back of the Detroit Tigers in the American League.

Through 2025, the teams have made the playoffs in the same season four times. The first time was in 1995 when both teams won their respective divisions and advanced to their respective League Championship Series. The Reds lost the National League Championship Series to the Atlanta Braves to prevent an all-Ohio World Series. The Indians defeated the Seattle Mariners in the American League Championship Series, but lost to the Braves in the World Series.

In 2013 both the Indians and Reds qualified as wild-card teams, but Cleveland lost the AL Wild Card Game to the Tampa Bay Rays and Cincinnati lost the NL Wild Card Game to the Pittsburgh Pirates. Both teams qualified as wild card entries in the expanded 2020 playoffs, but each lost in the first round: Cleveland to the New York Yankees, Cincinnati to Atlanta. In 2025, both teams made the playoffs. Cleveland won the American League Central Division and the Cincinnati came fourteen games back of the Milwaukee Brewers in the National League Central Division but qualified as the NL's third wild card team. However, the Guardians lost their AL Wild Card Series to Detroit, while the Reds lost their NL Wild Card Series to the Los Angeles Dodgers.

=== Ohio Championship Series ===
In July 1910, the Cincinnati manager challenged the Cleveland Naps to a seven-game "Championship of Ohio" series, which was held after the conclusion of the regular season. The Reds won the opener in Cincinnati, 14–7, and ultimately won the series 4–3, with the home team winning all seven games. After the 1911 season, the series was held again, with the Reds winning 4–2. The opener of the 1911 series, however, only drew 580 fans in Cincinnati, and while the remaining games, all played at League Park in Cleveland, drew better, the series was discontinued.

=== First Ohio Cup ===
No.	Year	Date	Winner		Venue	Attendance
1	1989	April 2	Indians	1–0	Cooper Stadium	15,978
2	1990	April 8	Indians	12–3	Cooper Stadium	15,878
3	1991	April 7	Indians	4–3	Cooper Stadium	16,276
4	1992	April 5	Reds	2–0	Cooper Stadium	15,820
5	1993	April 3	Indians	9–1	Cooper Stadium	15,596
6	1994	April 1	Indians	8–4	Cooper Stadium	15,894
7	1995	March 31	Reds	6–1	Cooper Stadium	2,000
8	1996	March 31	Indians	5–3	Cooper Stadium	16,697

Details of the original Ohio Cup were unveiled at a press conference on August 25, 1988. At that time, the two teams occasionally played each other in spring training and had yet to make the post-season in the same season. The managers of both teams did not treat the cup game as anything more than an exhibition, but many fans in Columbus treated it like a referendum on major league sports in the city as, at that time, Columbus did not have any major sports franchises.

Sitting between Cleveland and Cincinnati, the city was always divided when it came to allegiance to the state's big league teams. "Half the fans (in Columbus) love the Reds and hate the Indians and the other half love the Indians and hate the Reds. It's a great matchup", said the game's promoter, Keith Sprunk. Indians manager Doc Edwards agreed. "I'll love to play it, it's great. San Francisco and Oakland do the same thing. I'd like to see (the Ohio Cup) become an annual thing, either during the spring or in the summer." Crowds averaged 15,910 fans for the first five Ohio Cups at the 15,000-seat Cooper Stadium. Those crowds ranked 3rd, 4th, 7th, 9th and 12th among all-time largest baseball crowds at the stadium. Only about 2000 made it out in 1995 with temperatures near freezing and replacement players taking the field.

The first Ohio Cup match-up was marred by 40 °F (4 °C) temperatures made colder by constant rain and brisk wind. Cleveland started only four regulars while Cincinnati opted to play seven of their nine starters. It remained scoreless until the top of the eighth inning when a throwing error by Reds outfielder Herm Winningham allowed Luis Aguayo to score the only run. Minor league pitcher Greg McMichael received the win while Reds' reliever Mike Griffin was credited with the loss.

In the 1990 contest, catchers Sandy Alomar Jr. and Joel Skinner combined for six RBI as the Indians won their second straight Ohio Cup before a standing-room only crowd. In an action-packed game, the Indians banged out 13 hits, including six in the fourth inning which resulted in seven-runs. Cory Snyder hit a monster blast off Danny Jackson that traveled well past the 400-foot sign in straightaway center field. Alomar homered twice, the first a three-run shot to left-center, the second a solo effort. Skinner hit a two-run shot after being brought in to replace Alomar.

Indians outfielder Albert Belle hit his eleventh home run of the exhibition season as the Indians beat the defending World Series Champion Reds 4–3 in 1991. Jerry Browne hit a sacrifice fly in the seventh inning to lift the Indians to victory. The Reds finally ended their rivals' supremacy in 1992. Cincinnati took the lead in the first. Lead off hitter Bip Roberts doubled and later scored. They added another run in the fourth. Reds' third baseman Chris Sabo counted an RBI double among his two hits while Albert Belle hit two of his team's four hits.

Mike Bielecki stopped Cincinnati on one run and four hits in six innings and Albert Belle had a three-run single as the Tribe won their fourth Ohio Cup in five years in the 1993 contest. Highlights included a home run by Indians' first baseman Paul Sorrento. The only Reds run was scored by Barry Larkin.

In 1994, Manny Ramírez and Paul Sorrento homered in a five-run second inning to help give the Indians an 8–4 win. Mark Clark pitched seven innings, allowing five hits and three runs, walking one and striking out five to gain the win. Albert Belle and Eddie Murray led off the second inning with singles and Sorrento followed with his homer. After Jim Thome singled, Ramírez homered. All five runs came off Tom Browning.

With the 1994–95 Major League Baseball strike only coming to an end on April 2, replacement players traveled to Columbus to take part in the 1995 edition. Teamsters picketed outside the stadium as snow fell. With temperatures near freezing and replacements Tim Delgado and Rich Sauveur taking the mound, only a couple thousand fans made it out. The Reds won the game 6–1.

A line drive single by Julio Franco in the fifth inning broke a 3–3 tie as Cleveland defeated Cincinnati 5–3 to win the final Ohio Cup in 1996. Manny Ramírez had given Cleveland a 3–1 lead with a three-run homer to left field in the second off the Reds' Mark Portugal. Hal Morris drove in two runs for the Reds with a first-inning single and a double in the third, with Bret Boone scoring both times. A single by Vince Coleman in the fifth drove in Jeff Branson and tied the score at 3–3. The victory gave the Indians a 6–2 lead in the Ohio Cup series and was viewed by 16,697 people, the largest crowd in the game's history and the second largest at Cooper Stadium. Indians starter Joe Roa was the winning pitcher.

== Interleague Series (1997–present) ==
The former logo for the Ohio Cup.

In 1997 the Ohio Cup match series was discontinued with the introduction of interleague play and games between the Indians and the Reds continued as the "Battle of Ohio" series. The Indians and Reds first met on June 16, 1997 at Jacobs Field, in front of a sellout crowd of 42,961. Cleveland starting pitcher Orel Hershiser struck out lead off hitter Deion Sanders. Indians' designated hitter Kevin Seitzer recorded the first ever hit in a Battle for Ohio game when he doubled in the bottom of the first inning. Pokey Reese recorded the series’ first run, scoring in the top of the second inning for the Reds. Manny Ramírez hit the first Buckeye Series home run in the bottom of the ninth, but it was not enough to prevent the Reds winning the first game 4–1.

With the exception of 2002, the two teams have played each other every year since interleague play has been established. They have played each other six times every year from 1999 to 2012 except 2002 and 2003, with each team hosting a three-game series. The Reds and Indians did not play each other in 2002 and played one three-game series in 2003.

=== Ohio Cup revived ===
The Ohio Cup was reintroduced in 2008 with a new trophy. The trophy was 3 feet high, with a 12-inch stainless cup in the middle. It is awarded to the team that wins the season series in a given year. When the teams split the season series, the team that currently holds the trophy retains it. Through the 2026 season, the Indians/Guardians have won the trophy eight times, the Reds five times, with six ties.

In the revived trophy's inaugural season, the Reds swept the first three-game series at home, which took place May 16–18 2008, after strong performances by Edinson Vólquez, Aaron Harang, and Johnny Cueto. As the series moved back to Cleveland on June 27–29, with the Indians' CC Sabathia throwing a 6–0 shutout against the Reds in the first game. In the second, the Reds battled back with a strong effort by Cueto to win game two 5–0. The Cincinnati Reds clinched the cup with this win. In the final game in Cleveland, the Reds overcame a late surge by the Tribe to win 9–5, and the series itself 5 games to 1. Ballots were passed out in the middle of the final game for the MVP, awarded to Reds outfielder Adam Dunn, who had a combined five home runs and 10 RBI in the series.

In 2009, the Reds retained the trophy, winning four of the six contests. The Reds took two of the three games in Cincinnati in May, and went on to win two of the three games in Cleveland in June. In 2010, the Reds won the Ohio Cup again, winning 2 of 3 games in Cincinnati, and again winning 2 of 3 games in Cleveland. The Indians won the trophy in 2011 by sweeping the first series in Cleveland, and winning 2 of 3 in the Cincinnati series. The Indians retained the trophy in 2012 and 2013 as the two teams split the Ohio Cup series, with each team sweeping their respective home series.

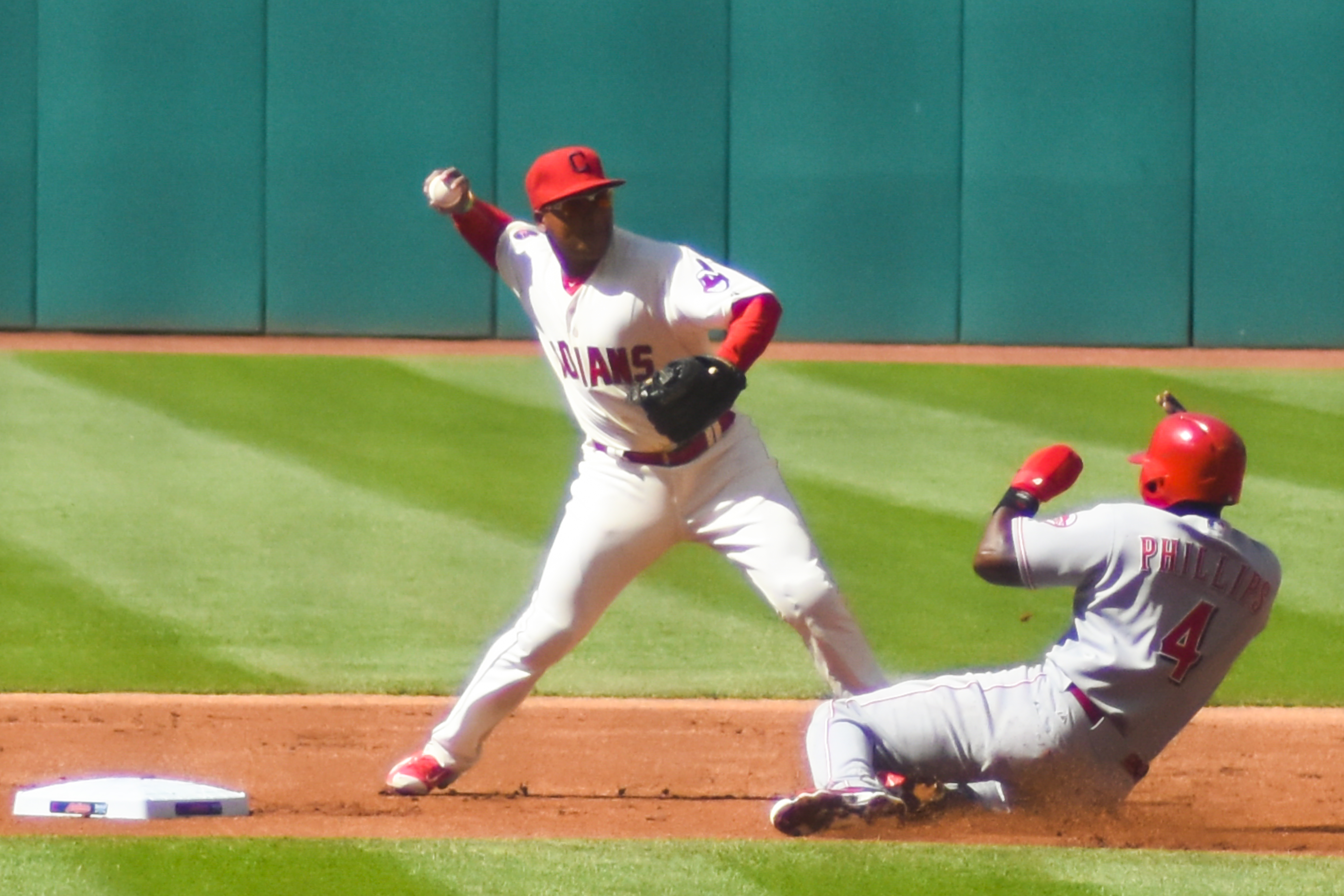
The Indians and Reds play at Progressive Field in 2015

Beginning in 2013, this rivalry, along with all other interleague rivalries, played four games per year in two back-to-back two-game series, instead of six games as they played through 2012. From 2013 to 2017 the two teams would play in one city on a Monday and Tuesday and the other city that Wednesday and Thursday. Since 2019, the teams now play the four games in separate two-game series due to changes in the MLB schedule. The teams played six games in separate three-game series in 2015, 2018 and 2021, when the AL Central played the NL Central as part of the interleague play rotation. In 2023, under the MLB's new balanced schedule, they adopted the four-game series format, with two games in each ballpark each season. In 2025, the six-game series format was restored with three games in each ballpark annually.

The Indians dominated the series in 2015 and 2016, winning nine of the ten games during those years including the only season-sweep by either team in 2016.

On May 7, 2021, Reds P Wade Miley threw the first and, to date, only no-hitter in the series, leading the Reds to a 3–0 win at Progressive Field.

In 2024, the Reds became the first of either teams to have two managers for a single season series, with one at each respective series (full-term manager David Bell in Cincinnati and interim manager Freddie Benavides in Cleveland).

In the 2025 offseason, the Reds hired Terry Francona to be their manager after he had managed Cleveland for 11 years from 2013–2023. This made Francona the first person to manage both teams. In his first season as Reds manager, Cincinnati went 5–1 against the Guardians. It was the first time in the rivalry the Reds had beaten Cleveland five consecutive times, as well as their first Ohio Cup win since 2014. The Guardians responded by going 4–2 in the 2026 series.

== Season-by-season results ==
Cincinnati Reds vs. Cleveland Guardians Season-by-Season Results
1990s (Indians, 7–5)

Season	Season series		at Cincinnati Reds	at Cleveland Indians	Overall series	Notes
1997	Reds	2‍–‍1	no games	Reds, 2‍–‍1	Reds; 2‍–‍1	Interleague play was introduced in the 1997 season, marking the first time the Indians and Reds played each other in the regular season. Indians lose the 1997 World Series.
1998	Indians	2‍–‍1	Indians, 2‍–‍1	no games	Tie; 3‍–‍3	Indians win the AL Central title.
1999	Indians	4‍–‍2	Indians, 3‍–‍0	Reds, 2‍–‍1	Indians; 7‍–‍5	First year of six-game home-away format. Indians win the AL Central title.

2000s (Reds, 26–25)

Season	Season series		at Cincinnati Reds	at Cleveland Indians	Overall series	Notes
2000	Tie	3‍–‍3	Reds, 2‍–‍1	Indians, 2‍–‍1	Indians; 10‍–‍8	On July 8 in Cincinnati, the Reds beat the Indians 14-5, their most runs scored in a game against the Indians and their largest margin of victory over the Indians.
2001	Tie	3‍–‍3	Indians, 2‍–‍1	Reds, 2‍–‍1	Indians; 13‍–‍11	Last series the Indians and Reds played at Cinergy Field (previously known as Riverfront Stadium). Indians win the AL Central title.
2003	Indians	2‍–‍1	no games	Indians, 2‍–‍1	Indians; 15‍–‍12	No games played in the 2002 season. Series reverts to 3-game format for 2003 season. Reds open up at Great American Ball Park.
2004	Indians	4‍–‍2	Reds, 2‍–‍1	Indians, 3‍–‍0	Indians; 19‍–‍14	First time the Indians sweep the Reds at home.
2005	Indians	4‍–‍2	Indians, 2‍–‍1	Indians, 2‍–‍1	Indians; 23‍–‍16	
2006	Tie	3‍–‍3	Indians, 2‍–‍1	Reds, 2‍–‍1	Indians; 26‍–‍19	On June 30 in Cincinnati, the Reds overcame 7–0 & 8–4 deficits to defeat the Indians 9–8, as Adam Dunn hit a walk off grand slam in the bottom of the 9th inning.
2007	Tie	3‍–‍3	Reds, 2‍–‍1	Indians, 2‍–‍1	Indians; 29‍–‍22	Indians win the AL Central title.
2008	Reds	5‍–‍1	Reds, 3‍–‍0	Reds, 2‍–‍1	Indians; 30‍–‍27	First time Reds sweep the Indians at home. Following their loss to the Reds on June 28, the Indians go on a 10–game losing streak. The Ohio Cup trophy is awarded for the first time.
2009	Reds	4‍–‍2	Reds, 2‍–‍1	Reds, 2‍–‍1	Indians; 32‍–‍31	

2010s (Indians, 31–19)

Season	Season series		at Cincinnati Reds	at Cleveland Indians	Overall series	Notes
2010	Reds	4‍–‍2	Reds, 2‍–‍1	Reds, 2‍–‍1	Reds; 35‍–‍34	Reds retake the overall series record for the first time since 1997. To date, this remains the last season the Reds held the overall series record. Reds win the NL Central title.
2011	Indians	5‍–‍1	Indians, 2‍–‍1	Indians, 3‍–‍0	Indians; 39‍–‍36	
2012	Tie	3‍–‍3	Reds, 3‍–‍0	Indians, 3‍–‍0	Indians; 42‍–‍39	First time both teams sweep at home in a season. Reds win the NL Central title.
2013	Tie	2‍–‍2	Reds, 2‍–‍0	Indians, 2‍–‍0	Indians; 44‍–‍41	Series changed to four game home-away format, except in the years that the AL Central plays the NL Central. Both teams earn wild card berths but lose to their respective Wild Card Games.
2014	Reds	3‍–‍1	Reds, 2‍–‍0	Tie, 1‍–‍1	Indians; 45‍–‍44	
2015	Indians	5‍–‍1	Indians, 2‍–‍1	Indians, 3‍–‍0	Indians; 50‍–‍45	
2016	Indians	4‍–‍0	Indians, 2‍–‍0	Indians, 2‍–‍0	Indians; 54‍–‍45	Following their loss and eventual sweep to the Indians on May 16, the Reds go on a 11–game losing streak. Only season sweep by either team. Indians lose the 2016 World Series.
2017	Tie	2‍–‍2	Tie, 1‍–‍1	Tie, 1‍–‍1	Indians; 56‍–‍47	First time both teams split the season series. Indians win the AL Central title.
2018	Indians	4‍–‍2	Indians, 3‍–‍0	Reds, 2‍–‍1	Indians; 60‍–‍49	On July 11 in Progressive Field, Indians beat the Reds 19-4, their most runs scored in a game against the Reds and their largest victory over the Reds with a 15-run differential. Indians win the AL Central title.
2019	Indians	3‍–‍1	Indians, 2‍–‍0	Tie, 1‍–‍1	Indians; 63‍–‍50	

2020s (Indians/Guardians, 18–16)

Season	Season series		at Cincinnati Reds	at Cleveland Indians/Guardians	Overall series	Notes
2020	Indians	3‍–‍1	Tie, 1‍–‍1	Indians, 2‍–‍0	Indians; 66‍–‍51	Both teams qualified for the postseason but lose to their respective Wild Card Series.
2021	Tie	3‍–‍3	Reds, 2‍–‍1	Indians, 2‍–‍1	Indians; 69‍–‍54	On May 7, Reds P Wade Miley threw a no-hitter in a 3–0 win.
2022	Tie	2‍–‍2	Guardians, 2‍–‍0	Reds, 2‍–‍0	Guardians; 71‍–‍56	The Indians change their name to the "Guardians". Following their loss to the Guardians on April 12, the Reds go on a 11–game losing streak. Away team wins all games for the first time in series history. Guardians win the AL Central title.
2023	Tie	2‍–‍2	Tie, 1‍–‍1	Tie, 1‍–‍1	Guardians; 73‍–‍58	Temporary adoption of the four-game series format, with two games in each ballpark every season. This will change in 2025, with 3-and-3 series returning.
2024	Guardians	3‍–‍1	Tie, 1‍–‍1	Guardians, 2‍–‍0	Guardians; 76‍–‍59	Reds become the first of either teams to have two managers for a single season series, with one at each series (David Bell in Cincinnati, Freddie Benavides in Cleveland). Guardians win the AL Central title.
2025	Reds	5‍–‍1	Reds, 3‍–‍0	Reds, 2‍–‍1	Guardians; 77‍–‍64	Reds hire former Guardians manager Terry Francona prior to the season. Both teams make the playoffs losing in their respective Wild Card Series. Guardians win the AL Central title. Reds make the postseason as a wild card team.
2026	Guardians	4‍–‍2	Guardians, 2‍–‍1	Guardians, 2‍–‍1	Guardians; 81‍–‍66	

Summary of Results

Season	Season series		at Cincinnati Reds	at Cleveland Guardians	Notes
Regular season games	Guardians	81‍–‍66	Tie, 36‍–‍36	Guardians, 45‍–‍30	

== Spring training ==
The Guardians and Reds have played each other many times in spring training as part of the Grapefruit League and Cactus League as the two teams trained at various times in Florida and Arizona. Since 2010, the Guardians and Reds have shared Goodyear Ballpark in Goodyear, Arizona as their main spring training site.

The teams cleared their benches during an exhibition in 1993, when José Mesa threw a pitch behind Cincinnati's Hal Morris leading to a fight in which Morris separated his shoulder when Mesa slammed him to the ground.

== See also ==
- Major League Baseball rivalries
- Baseball awards#Awards given to specific teams
- Bengals–Browns rivalry
