= Cecil, Arkansas =

- Unincorporated community
- Location within Arkansas Location within the United States
- Coordinates: 35°26′19″N 93°56′41″W
- Country: United States
- State: Arkansas
- County: Franklin
- Elevation: 863 ft (263 m)
- Time zone: UTC-6 (Central (CST))
  - Summer (DST): UTC-5 (CDT)
- ZIP code: 72930
- Area code: 479
- GNIS feature ID: 47557

Cecil is an unincorporated community in Franklin County, Arkansas, United States. Cecil is located at the junction of Arkansas highways 41 and 96, 7.5 miles (12.1 km) west-southwest of Ozark. Cecil has a post office with ZIP code 72930.

There was a local business in Cecil Arkansas that went by the name of “The Cecil Store” which is now closed.

Citadel Bluff Park closed permanently in 2012 but the Boat access to the Arkansas River remains open.

== Climate ==
The climate in this area is characterized by hot, humid summers and generally mild to cool winters. According to the Köppen Climate Classification system, Cecil has a humid subtropical climate, abbreviated "Cfa" on climate maps.
