= Caulksville, Arkansas =

- Town
- Location of Caulksville in Logan County, Arkansas.
- Coordinates: 35°18′06″N 93°52′05″W
- Country: United States
- State: Arkansas
- County: Logan

Area
  - Total: 1.36 sq mi (3.53 km^{2})
  - Land: 1.35 sq mi (3.49 km^{2})
  - Water: 0.015 sq mi (0.04 km^{2})
- Elevation: 394 ft (120 m)

Population (2020)
  - Total: 154
  - Estimate (2025): 159 ▲
  - Density: 114.2/sq mi (44.11/km^{2})
- Time zone: UTC-6 (Central (CST))
  - Summer (DST): UTC-5 (CDT)
- FIPS code: 05-12190
- GNIS feature ID: 2406239

Caulksville is a town in Logan County, Arkansas, United States. The town was named for Richard Caulk, who received a land patent at the location of the town in 1860. As of the 2020 census, Caulksville had a population of 154.

The town opened a post office in 1870 and the same year, a Missionary Baptist church was built just a few miles north of Caulksville.

== Geography ==
According to the United States Census Bureau, the town has a total area of 3.5 km^{2} (1.4 sq mi), of which 3.5 km^{2} (1.4 sq mi) is land and 0.74% is water.

== Demographics ==
Historical population
Census	Pop.	Note	%±
1880	81		—
1970	208		—
1980	234		12.5%
1990	224		−4.3%
2000	233		4.0%
2010	213		−8.6%
2020	154		−27.7%
2025 (est.)	159	▲	3.2%
U.S. Decennial Census; 2014 Estimate

As of the census of 2000, there were 233 people, 97 households, and 67 families residing in the town. The population density was 66.6 people/km^{2} (172 people/mi^{2}). There were 103 housing units at an average density of 29.5 units/km^{2} (76 units/mi^{2}). The racial makeup of the town was 96.14% White caulk, 1.72% Black or African American, 1.29% Native American, and 0.86% from two or more races. 0.86% of the population were Hispanic or Latino of any race.

There were 97 households, out of which 27.8% had children under the age of 18 living with them, 56.7% were married couples living together, 12.4% had a female householder with no husband present, and 29.9% were non-families. 26.8% of all households were made up of individuals, and 14.4% had someone living alone who was 65 years of age or older. The average household size was 2.40 and the average family size was 2.91.

In the town, the population was spread out, with 24.5% under the age of 18, 7.3% from 18 to 24, 23.2% from 25 to 44, 25.3% from 45 to 64, and 19.7% who were 65 years of age or older. The median age was 42 years. For every 100 females, there were 84.9 males. For every 100 females age 18 and over, there were 81.4 males.

The median income for a household in the town was $30,000, and the median income for a family was $33,250. Males had a median income of $30,729 versus $18,125 for females. The per capita income for the town was $21,428. About 13.9% of families and 13.7% of the population were below the poverty line, including 18.2% of those under the age of eighteen and 18.6% of those 65 or over.

The population was 213 at the 2010 census.
