= Horatio, Arkansas =

- City
- Location of Horatio in Sevier County, Arkansas.
- Coordinates: 33°56′21″N 94°21′13″W
- Country: United States
- State: Arkansas
- County: Sevier

Area
  - Total: 1.80 sq mi (4.66 km^{2})
  - Land: 1.78 sq mi (4.62 km^{2})
  - Water: 0.015 sq mi (0.04 km^{2})
- Elevation: 384 ft (117 m)

Population (2020)
  - Total: 920
  - Estimate (2025): 907 ▼
  - Density: 515.6/sq mi (199.07/km^{2})
- Time zone: UTC-6 (Central (CST))
  - Summer (DST): UTC-5 (CDT)
- ZIP code: 71842
- Area code: 870
- FIPS code: 05-33310
- GNIS feature ID: 2404728
- Website: cityofhoratio.org

Horatio is a city in Sevier County, Arkansas, United States. As of the 2020 census, Horatio had a population of 920.

== History ==
Horatio was founded in 1895. For several years until at least 1905, Horatio was a sundown town, where African Americans were not allowed to live.

== Geography ==
According to the United States Census Bureau, the city has a total area of 1.8 square miles (4.7 km^{2}), all land.

== Demographics ==
Historical population
Census	Pop.	Note	%±
1900	625		—
1910	605		−3.2%
1920	1,038		71.6%
1930	1,028		−1.0%
1940	809		−21.3%
1950	776		−4.1%
1960	722		−7.0%
1970	852		18.0%
1980	989		16.1%
1990	793		−19.8%
2000	997		25.7%
2010	1,044		4.7%
2020	920		−11.9%
2025 (est.)	907	▼	−1.4%
U.S. Decennial Census

=== 2020 census ===
Horatio racial composition
Race	Number	Percentage
White (non-Hispanic)	491	53.37%
Black or African American (non-Hispanic)	21	2.28%
Native American	18	1.96%
Asian	3	0.33%
Other/Mixed	74	8.04%
Hispanic or Latino	313	34.02%

As of the 2020 United States census, there were 920 people, 375 households, and 252 families residing in the city.

=== 2000 census ===
As of the census of 2000, there were 997 people, 377 households, and 265 families residing in the city. The population density was 546.0 inhabitants per square mile (210.8/km^{2}). There were 423 housing units at an average density of 231.6 per square mile (89.4/km^{2}). The racial makeup of the city was 84.95% White, 2.71% Black or African American, 1.81% Native American, 0.20% Asian, 8.53% from other races, and 1.81% from two or more races. 14.94% of the population were Hispanic or Latino of any race.

There were 377 households, out of which 38.2% had children under the age of 18 living with them, 52.3% were married couples living together, 13.3% had a female householder with no husband present, and 29.7% were non-families. 26.3% of all households were made up of individuals, and 15.4% had someone living alone who was 65 years of age or older. The average household size was 2.64 and the average family size was 3.22.

In the city, the population was spread out, with 31.2% under the age of 18, 6.7% from 18 to 24, 28.1% from 25 to 44, 18.3% from 45 to 64, and 15.7% who were 65 years of age or older. The median age was 34 years. For every 100 females, there were 89.2 males. For every 100 females age 18 and over, there were 84.4 males.

The median income for a household in the city was $27,419, and the median income for a family was $31,000. Males had a median income of $26,339 versus $15,547 for females. The per capita income for the city was $11,738. About 12.6% of families and 13.4% of the population were below the poverty line, including 16.6% of those under age 18 and 22.1% of those age 65 or over.

Public education is provided to elementary and secondary students by the Horatio School District leading to graduation at Horatio High School (grades 7–12) after matriculating Horatio Elementary School (grades prekindergarten through sixth).

== Transport ==
While there is no transit service in Horatio, intercity bus service is provided by Jefferson Lines in nearby Lockesburg.

== Notable person ==
- DeAnn Vaught - Horatio farmer and Republican member since 2015 of the Arkansas House of Representatives for Sevier and Little River counties

== See also ==
- List of sundown towns in the United States
