= Denning, Arkansas =

- Town
- Location of Denning in Franklin County, Arkansas.
- Coordinates: 35°25′31″N 93°45′24″W
- Country: United States
- State: Arkansas
- County: Franklin

Area
  - Total: 1.08 sq mi (2.79 km^{2})
  - Land: 1.08 sq mi (2.79 km^{2})
  - Water: 0 sq mi (0.00 km^{2})
- Elevation: 420 ft (130 m)

Population (2020)
  - Total: 200
  - Estimate (2025): 209 ▲
  - Density: 185.6/sq mi (71.67/km^{2})
- Time zone: UTC-6 (Central (CST))
  - Summer (DST): UTC-5 (CDT)
- FIPS code: 05-18370
- GNIS feature ID: 2406374

Denning is a town in Franklin County, Arkansas, United States. The population was 200 at the 2020 census, down from 314 at the 2010 census.

== Geography ==
Denning is located in southeastern Franklin County and is bordered to the north by the city of Altus.

According to the United States Census Bureau, the town has a total area of 1.1 square miles (2.8 km^{2}), all land.

It sustained a direct hit from a tornado during the late-May 2011 tornado outbreak.

== Demographics ==
Historical population
Census	Pop.	Note	%±
1910	757		—
1920	608		−19.7%
1930	384		−36.8%
1940	341		−11.2%
1950	268		−21.4%
1960	227		−15.3%
1970	203		−10.6%
1980	238		17.2%
1990	206		−13.4%
2000	270		31.1%
2010	314		16.3%
2020	200		−36.3%
2025 (est.)	209	▲	4.5%
U.S. Decennial Census; 2014 Estimate

As of the census of 2000, there were 270 people, 102 households, and 75 families residing in the town. The population density was 94.8 people/km^{2} (246 people/mi^{2}). There were 115 housing units at an average density of 40.4 units/km^{2} (105 units/mi^{2}). The racial makeup of the town was 95.19% White, 0.37% Black or African American, 0.74% Native American, 1.85% Asian, and 1.85% from two or more races. 2.22% of the population were Hispanic or Latino of any race.

There were 102 households, out of which 33.3% had children under the age of 18 living with them, 60.8% were married couples living together, 5.9% had a female householder with no husband present, and 25.5% were non-families. 22.5% of all households were made up of individuals, and 12.7% had someone living alone who was 65 years of age or older. The average household size was 2.65 and the average family size was 3.04.

In the town, the population was spread out, with 26.3% under the age of 18, 6.7% from 18 to 24, 28.9% from 25 to 44, 20.0% from 45 to 64, and 18.1% who were 65 years of age or older. The median age was 39 years. For every 100 females, there were 100.0 males. For every 100 females age 18 and over, there were 97.0 males.

The median income for a household in the town was $23,750, and the median income for a family was $32,708. Males had a median income of $19,792 versus $17,344 for females. The per capita income for the town was $12,487. About 22.8% of families and 21.8% of the population were below the poverty line, including 18.4% of those under the age of eighteen and 9.8% of those 65 or over.

== Education ==
Denning is served by the Ozark School District, leading to graduation at Ozark High School. The Altus-Denning School District was closed in 2004 after an Arkansas law was passed requiring many small schools in the state to consolidate, usually with a bigger school close by. Prior to closing the Altus-Denning High School mascot was the Owls and competed in the 1A classification of the Arkansas Activities Association (AAA).
