= Leslee Milam Post =

American politician

Leslee Milam Post is an American politician from the state of Arkansas. A member of the Democratic Party, Post served in the Arkansas House of Representatives.

Post graduated from Ozark High School in Ozark, Arkansas, and the University of the Ozarks with a bachelor's degree in communications. She worked as the executive director of the Crisis Center for Women in Fort Smith, Arkansas. She developed Leadership Franklin County in collaboration with Arkansas Tech University–Ozark Campus. She is the charter president of Altus Area Sunset Rotary Club.

Post was the Area Director for the Leukemia and Lymphoma Society and served as the executive director for the American Diabetes Association for Arkansas, Louisiana, Mississippi, and Oklahoma from 2020 to 2024. She is currently the CEO of the Elizabeth Richardson Center in Springdale, Arkansas.

Representative Post was elected to the Arkansas House in 2010. She was challenged in the 2012 election by Bill Gossage. Post lost to Gossage.

Post was married to Andrew Post of Post Familie Winery from 1999 to 2017. They share four children; Claire, Molly, Jack and Sara Jane.
