= Ozark School District =

School district in Arkansas

The Ozark School District #14 is a public school district in western Arkansas, based in Ozark, Arkansas, serving most of northern Franklin County and a small portion of western Johnson County. The district is a member of the Western Arkansas Educational Service Cooperative, which includes districts in western Arkansas. As of 2004, the student population of the district was about 1,600. The above figure was tallied before the Altus-Denning School District merged with this district the same year, making future tallies notably higher. The district, most notably the high school, is most famous for its mascot, the Hillbilly. Patrons claim that Ozark is the only district in the Union with the Hillbilly as its mascot, though both the nickname and comparable likenesses are used by other schools. However, Ozark is the only district to use the nickname and likeness together.

== History ==
On July 1, 2004 the Altus-Denning School District consolidated into the Ozark School District; the communities of Altus and Denning became parts of the Ozark district.

== Statistics ==
=== Area ===
The district covers approximately 566.5 km² (352 mi²), including the 40.2 km² (25 mi²) served by Altus-Denning prior to merging in 2004. The area served is split into two areas. Most of the district covers the central, east-central, and most of the northeastern parts of Franklin County, and a small portion of Johnson County between the Jasper and Westside school districts. The area separated from the rest of the district by the Mulberry–Pleasant View and Huntsville school districts serves the northwest part of Franklin County around the community of Fern.

=== Students ===
As of 2004, before Altus-Denning merged with the district, the Average Daily Membership of the school district was 1600, with approximately 40-45% of students eligible for free or reduced lunches under the Federal School Lunch Program.
As of the 2008 - 2009 school year there were 1,863 students enrolled in the Ozark School district with 5 total schools and 150 classroom teachers. This gave a student/teacher ratio of 12.42. There were 11 kindergarten teachers, 67 elementary teachers, 59 secondary teachers, and 13 ungraded. The total revenue for the 2008-2009 school year amounted to $8,657 per student (12% federal, 32% local, and 56% from the state).

Administration Information
Superintendent: Jim Ford
Assistant Superintendent: Jordan Price
Administrative Assistant: Julie Hicks
District Treasurer: Sherrie Sanders
Athletic Director: Jordan Price
Mailing Address: P.O. Box 135 Ozark, AR 72949

== Schools ==
- Ozark High School (10-12)

Principal: Lexie Highfill
Counselor: Cindy Kramer
Mailing Address: 1631 Hillbilly Drive Ozark, AR 72949

- Ozark Junior High School (8-9)

Principal: Jerrod Burns
Counselor: Brenda Beard
Mailing Address: 1301 Walden Drive Ozark, AR 72949

- Ozark Middle School (6-7)

Principal: Brad Culver
Counselor: Sara Taylor
Mailing Address: P.O. Box 339 Altus, AR 72821

- Elgin B. Milton Elementary School (1-5)

Principal: Kelly Burns
Assistant Principal: Jeff Richard
Counselor: Lynn Burns
Mailing Address: 1601 Walden Drive Ozark, AR 72949

- Ozark Kindergarten School (K)

Principal: Jennifer King
Counselor: Kim Allred
Mailing Address: 700 N 12th Street Ozark, AR 72949

== Mascot and Colors ==
The school emblem (mascot) and colors have been shared by all schools in the district. The Hillbilly, which is almost always depicted in purple overalls and armed with a shotgun, was adopted as the school emblem in 1935. Purple and gold were adopted as the school colors the same year, replacing the red and white that had been used. The mascot and colors were similar to that of what was then the College of the Ozarks, whose mascot was the Mountaineer until the 1980s.

The original mascot was the Bulldogs until the 1930s when the school board voted to change it to the Hillbilly. In 2008, the high school baseball team tried to revive the original logo and colors, displaying the original "OHS" logo on their baseball hats which symbolizes a large "O" representing a baseball with an "H" in the middle symbolizing the seams on the baseball and then the letter "S".

== Athletics ==
The school is a member school of the Arkansas Activities Association and competes in the 4A classification and is a member of District 1 as of the 2011-2012 school year. Below are the head coaches and sponsors for the different sports and clubs which are overseen by the AAA for Ozark High School.

- Football Head Coach: Jeremie Burns
- Baseball Head Coach: Cody Bullard
- Boys' Basketball Head Coach: Brad Johnson
- Girls' Basketball Head Coach: Bret Nagel
- Boys' Golf Head Coach: Kendra Mainer
- Girls' Golf Head Coach: Kendra Mainer
- Boys' Track Head Coach: Eric Capp
- Girls' Track Head Coach: Jeff Richard
- Girls' Cross Country Head Coach: Jeff Richard
- Softball Head Coach: Peyton Timmerman

== Sources ==
- 2004-2005 Arkansas School Districts and cities
- Arkansas School Information Site
- Arkansas Activities Association
