= N.E. Dickerson Store =

- U.S. National Register of Historic Places
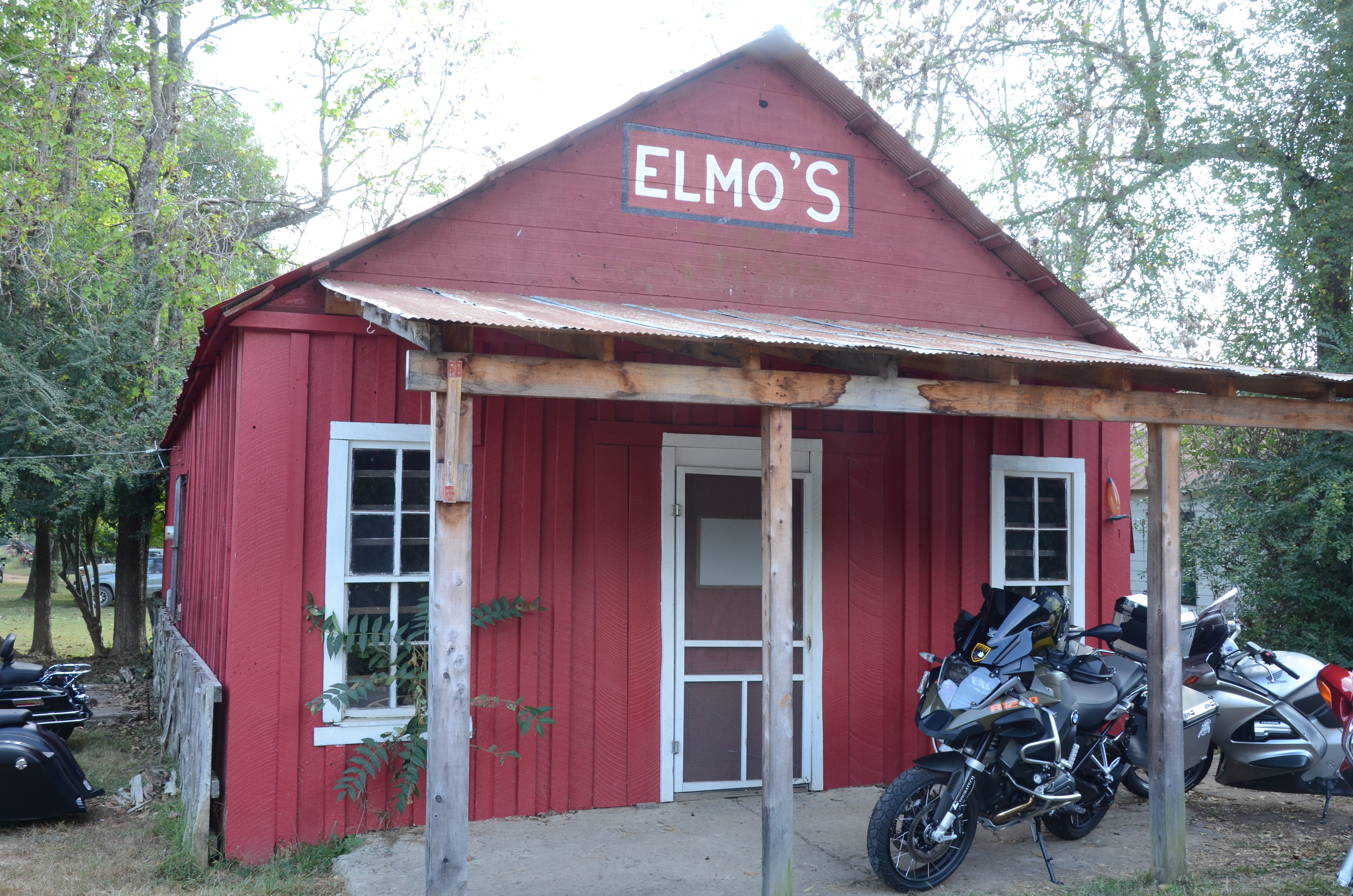

- Location within Arkansas Location within the United States
- Location: E of AR 215, Oark, Arkansas
- Coordinates: 35°41′21″N 93°34′23″W
- Area: less than one acre
- NRHP reference No.: 95001124
- Added to NRHP: September 22, 1995

The N.E. Dickerson Store is a historic commercial building on Arkansas Highway 215 in the village of Oark, Arkansas, just west of the Oark General Store. It is a single-story wood-frame building, with a gabled roof and a shed-roof porch extending across the front. The front is three bays, with sash windows flanking the entrance. It was built about 1902 to meet increased retail demand in the community, and operated in a cooperative arrangement with the Oark General Store. In the late 20th century, the buildings were both owned by the same family.

The building was listed on the National Register of Historic Places in 1995, at which time it was vacant.

== See also ==
- National Register of Historic Places listings in Johnson County, Arkansas
