= Oark High School =

Location
- 600 School Street; Oark, Arkansas 72852; United States; 35°41′18″N 93°34′35″W

Information
- School type: Public (government funded)
- Status: Open
- School district: Jasper School District
- NCES District ID: 0508240
- Authority: Arkansas Department of Education (ADE)
- CEEB code: 041875
- NCES School ID: 050824000811
- Teaching staff: 10.54 (on FTE basis)
- Grades: 7–12
- Enrollment: 70 (2023–2024)
- Student to teacher ratio: 6.64
- Education system: ADE Smart Core curriculum
- Classes offered: Regular, Advanced Placement, Concurrent Credit
- Campus type: Rural
- Colors: Purple and gold
- Athletics: Cross Country, Basketball, Track & Field
- Athletics conference: 1A West (2012–14)
- Mascot: Hornet
- Team name: Oark Hornets
- Accreditation: ADE
- Affiliation: Arkansas Activities Association
- Website: www.jasper.k12.ar.us/o/oark

Oark High School is a comprehensive public high school serving students in grades 7 through 12 in the rural community of Oark, Arkansas, United States. It is one of four public high schools in Johnson County. With fewer than 75 students in the 2012–13 school year, it is the smallest of the three high schools administered by the Jasper School District and one of the smallest in the state.

It was previously a part of the Oark School District. On July 1, 2004, the Oark district, along with the Kingston School District, merged into the Jasper district.

== Academics ==
The school is accredited by the Arkansas Department of Education (ADE). The assumed course of study follows the ADE Smart Core curriculum developed the ADE, which requires students to complete at least 22 credit units before graduation. Students engage in regular (core) and career focus courses and exams and may select Advanced Placement (AP) coursework and exams that may lead to college credit.

== Athletics ==
The Oark High School mascot and athletic emblem is the Hornet with the school colors of purple and gold.

The Oark Hornets participate in interscholastic activities in the 1A Classification within the 1A West Conference as administered by the Arkansas Activities Association. The Hornets school athletic activities include cross country (boys/girls), basketball (boys/girls), and track and field (boys/girls).
