= Arkansas Highway 215 =

State highway in Arkansas, United States

Highway 215

Route information
- Maintained by ArDOT
- Existed: 1958–present

Section 1
- Length: 8.80 mi (14.16 km)
- South end: CR 31 / CR 221
- North end: AR 96

Section 2
- Length: 15.94 mi (25.65 km)
- South end: US 64 / AR 917 in Mulberry
- North end: CR 77 / CR 102 in the Ouachita National Forest

Section 3
- Length: 16.44 mi (26.46 km)
- South end: AR 23 at Cass
- North end: CR 36 at Oark

Location
- Country: United States
- State: Arkansas
- Counties: Franklin, Crawford, Johnson

Highway system
- Arkansas Highway System; Interstate; US; State; Business; Spurs; Suffixed; Scenic; Heritage
← AR 214	→ AR 216

Highway 215 (AR 215, Ark. 215, and Hwy. 215) is a designation for three north–south state highways in northwest Arkansas. A southern route of 8.80 miles (14.16 km) runs north from Franklin County Road 31 and Franklin County Road 221 (CR 31/CR 221) at Dahoma to Highway 96 near the Arkansas River. A second route of 15.94 miles (25.65 km) begins at US Route 64/Highway 917 (US 64/AR 917) in Mulberry and runs north to CR 77/CR 102 in the Ozark National Forest. A third segment of 16.44 miles (26.46 km) begins at Highway 23 at Cass and runs north to Johnson CR 36 at Oark.

== Route description ==
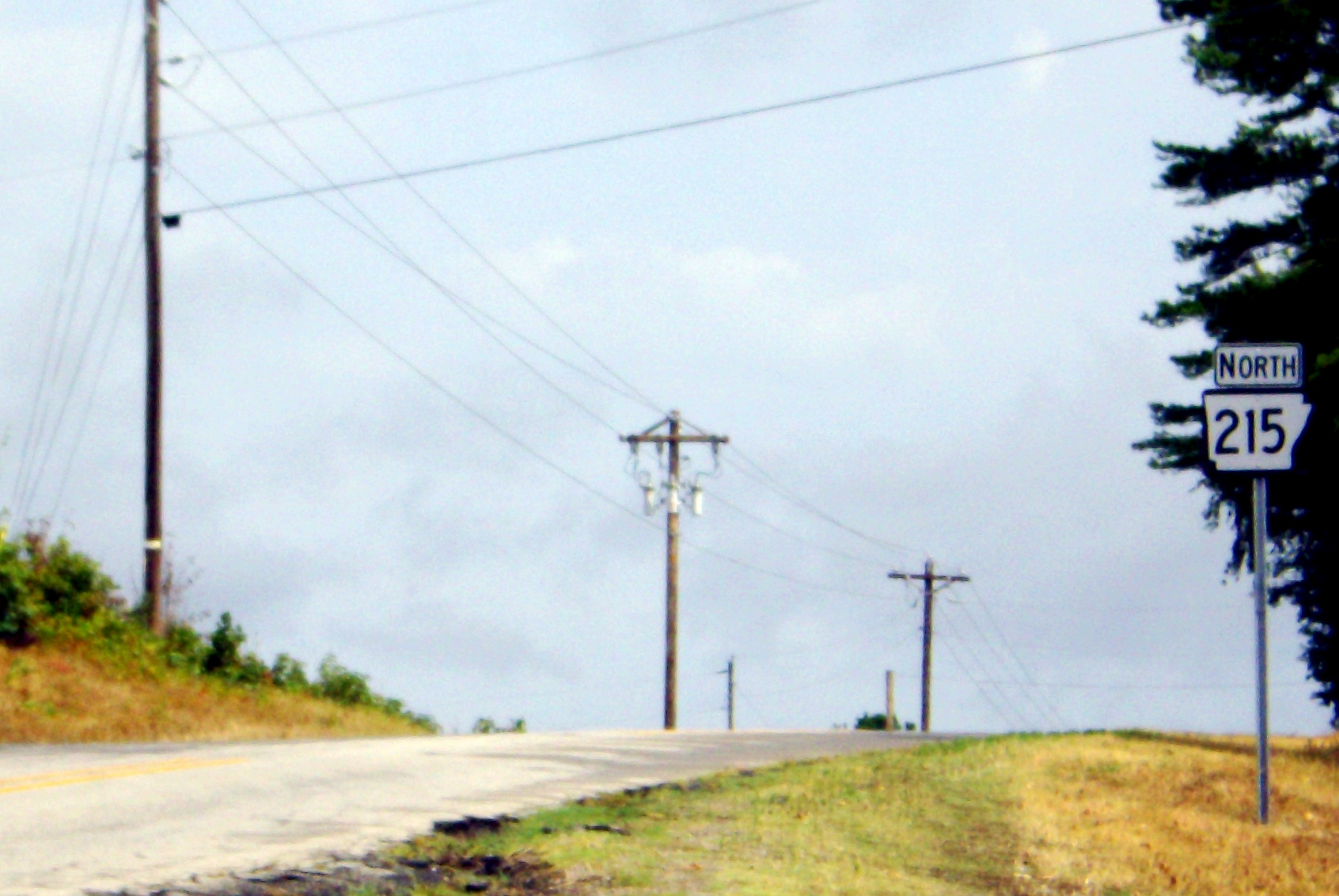
Highway 215 north of Mulberry

=== Franklin County ===
Highway 215 begins at Franklin CR 31/CR 221 west of Peter Pender and runs west to Vesta. The route has a junction with Highway 217 at Vesta before turning due north toward the Arkansas River. Highway 215 terminates at Highway 96 near the Crawford county line.

=== Mulberry to Ozark National Forest ===
The route begins in Mulberry at US 64 with the roadway continuing south as Highway 917. Highway 215 runs north through Mulberry past the Bryant-Lasater House on the National Register of Historic Places (NRHP) to a junction with Interstate 40 in north Mulberry. The highway continues north into Franklin County where it curves east around Fern and terminates at Franklin CR 77/CR 102 in the Ozark National Forest.

=== Cass to Oark ===
Highway 215 begins at Highway 23 (Pig Trail Scenic Byway) and runs east through the Ozark National Forest. The route enters Johnson County and enters Oark. Highway 215 terminates at Johnson CR 36 near the N.E. Dickerson Store and Oark School-Methodist Church, both listed on the NRHP.

== Major intersections ==
County	Location	mi	km	Destinations	Notes
Franklin	Dahoma	0.00	0.00	CR 31 / CR 221	Southern terminus
Franklin	Vesta	4.38	7.05	AR 217	
Franklin		8.80	14.16	AR 96	Northern terminus
Gap in route
Crawford	Mulberry	0.00	0.00	US 64 (6th Street) / AR 917 south (Main Street) – Ozark, Clarksville, Dyer, Alma	Southern terminus, AR 917 northern terminus
Crawford	Mulberry	1.89	3.04	I-40 – Little Rock, Fort Smith	exit 24
Franklin		15.94	25.65	CR 77 / CR 102	Northern terminus
Franklin	Gap in route				
Franklin	Cass	0.00	0.00	AR 23 (Pig Trail Scenic Byway) – Ozark, Huntsville	Southern terminus
Johnson		14.83	23.87	AR 103 south	AR 103 northern terminus
Johnson	Oark	16.44	26.46	CR 36	Northern terminus
1.000 mi = 1.609 km; 1.000 km = 0.621 mi

== See also ==
- List of state highways in Arkansas
