= Mulberry River Bridge (Pleasant Hill, Arkansas) =

- Formerly listed on the U.S. National Register of Historic Places
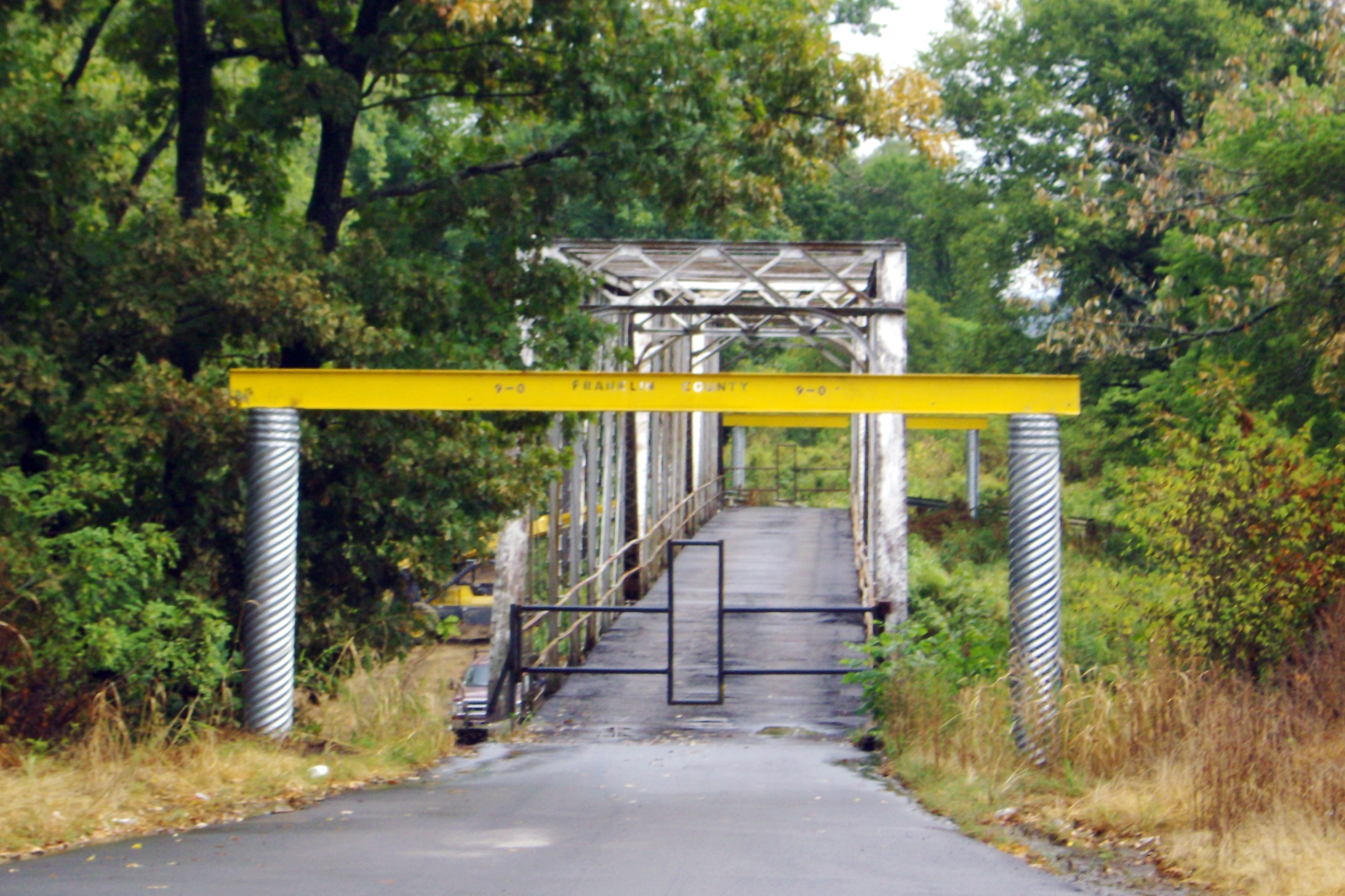
- Mulberry Bridge under rehabilitation, August 2011

- Location within Arkansas Location within the United States
- Nearest city: Pleasant Hill, Arkansas
- Coordinates: 35°31′50″N 94°2′27″W
- Area: less than one acre
- Built: 1912/1929
- Architect: Lakeside Bridge and Steel Company
- Architectural style: Pratt through truss
- MPS: Historic Bridges of Arkansas MPS
- NRHP reference No.: 06001272

Significant dates
- Added to NRHP: January 24, 2007
- Removed from NRHP: April 30, 2024

The Mulberry River Bridge, also known as the Silver Bridge and the Wire Ford Bridge, is a historic Pratt through truss bridge northeast of Pleasant Hill, Arkansas, now a neighborhood of the city of Mulberry. The bridge (which is closed for renovations) normally carries Wire Road/Center Point Road across the Mulberry River. The bridge has three spans, set on metal caissons filled with concrete, and has a total length of 342 feet (104 m). Each span measures 105 feet (32 m), and has a deck width of 12 feet (3.7 m) and a vertical clearance of 13 feet (4.0 m). In 1927 it was rebuilt when two of the three spans were washed out by the Mulberry River. The bridge is the last known multi-span Pratt through truss bridge in the state.

The bridge was listed on the National Register of Historic Places in 2007, and was delisted in 2024.

== See also ==
- List of bridges documented by the Historic American Engineering Record in Arkansas
- List of bridges on the National Register of Historic Places in Arkansas
- Mulberry River Bridge (Turner's Bend, Arkansas), also NRHP-listed
- National Register of Historic Places listings in Franklin County, Arkansas
- National Register of Historic Places listings in Crawford County, Arkansas
