= Franklin County Jail =

Franklin County Jail may refer to:

- Franklin County Jail (Columbus, Ohio)
- Franklin County Jail (Ozark, Arkansas), listed on the NRHP in Arkansas
- Franklin County Jail (Benton, Illinois), in Benton, IL, listed on the NRHP
- Franklin County Jail (Chambersburg, Pennsylvania), listed on the NRHP in Pennsylvania
- Franklin County Jail (Winchester, Tennessee), listed on the NRHP in Tennessee
