= Mulberry High School =

Mulberry High School may refer to:

- Mulberry High School (Arkansas), Mulberry, Arkansas, USA
- Mulberry High School (Florida), Mulberry, Florida, USA
