= Mulberry School District =

Defunct school district in Arkansas, United States

Mulberry School District was a school district headquartered in Mulberry, Arkansas.

On July 1, 2004, the district consolidated with the Pleasant View School District to form the Mulberry–Pleasant View Bi-County School District.
