= Jasper High School (Arkansas) =

Location
- 370 AR 215; Jasper, Arkansas 72852; United States; 36°0′16″N 93°11′28″W

Information
- School type: Public (government funded)
- Status: Open
- School district: Jasper School District
- NCES District ID: 0508240
- Authority: Arkansas Department of Education (ADE)
- CEEB code: 04023
- NCES School ID: 050824000545
- Teaching staff: 38.45 (on FTE basis)
- Grades: 7–12
- Enrollment: 204 (2023-2024)
- Student to teacher ratio: 5.31
- Education system: ADE Smart Core curriculum
- Classes offered: Regular, Advanced Placement
- Campus type: Rural
- Colors: Black and white
- Athletics: Cross Country, Basketball, Baseball, Softball, Track & Field
- Athletics conference: 1A West (2012–14)
- Mascot: Pirate
- Team name: Jasper Pirates
- Accreditation: ADE
- Affiliation: Arkansas Activities Association
- Website: www.jasper.k12.ar.us/o/jhs

Jasper High School is a comprehensive public high school serving students in grades 7 through 12 in the rural community of Jasper, Arkansas, United States. It is one of four public high schools located in Newton County and with 240 students in the 2010–11 school year, it is the largest of three high schools administered by the Jasper School District.

== Academics ==
The school is accredited by the Arkansas Department of Education (ADE). The assumed course of study follows the ADE Smart Core curriculum developed the Arkansas Department of Education (ADE), which requires students to complete at least 22 credit units before graduation. Students engage in regular (core) and career focus courses and exams and may select Advanced Placement (AP) coursework and exams that may lead to college credit.

== Athletics ==
The Jasper High School mascot and athletic emblem is the Pirate with the school colors of black and white.

The Jasper Pirates participate in various interscholastic activities in the 1A Classification within the 1A West Conference as administered by the Arkansas Activities Association. The Pirates school athletic activities include cross country (boys/girls), basketball (boys/girls) and track and field (boys/girls).

- Cross country: The boys cross country team won four consecutive state cross country championships (2004, 2005, 2006, 2007).
