= Oark School-Methodist Church =

Historic church in Arkansas, United States

- U.S. National Register of Historic Places
- Location within Arkansas Location within the United States
- Location: Co. Rd. 34, just north of AR 215, Oark, Arkansas
- Coordinates: 35.6912°N 93.5712°W
- Area: less than one acre
- Built: 1923
- Architectural style: Bungalow/craftsman
- MPS: Public Schools in the Ozarks MPS
- NRHP reference No.: 95001142
- Added to NRHP: September 29, 1995

The Oark School—Methodist Church is a historic church at the junction of Arkansas Highway 215 and County Road 34 in Oark, Arkansas. It is a rectangular single-story wood-frame structure, with a gabled roof, novelty siding, and a fieldstone foundation. The gable ends of the roof are adorned with large knee brackets. Originally built c. 1923 as a collaboration between the local Methodist congregation and the school district, it served as both a public school and Methodist academy, the latter for a single season. It was used as a public school until 1938, when the district was consolidated with other area districts. It was briefly used as a school again in the 1950s, after the existing school burned down. It is now used as a community meeting hall.

The building was listed on the National Register of Historic Places in 1995.

== See also ==
- National Register of Historic Places listings in Johnson County, Arkansas
