= Bristow Hotel =

- U.S. National Register of Historic Places
- U.S. Historic district – Contributing property
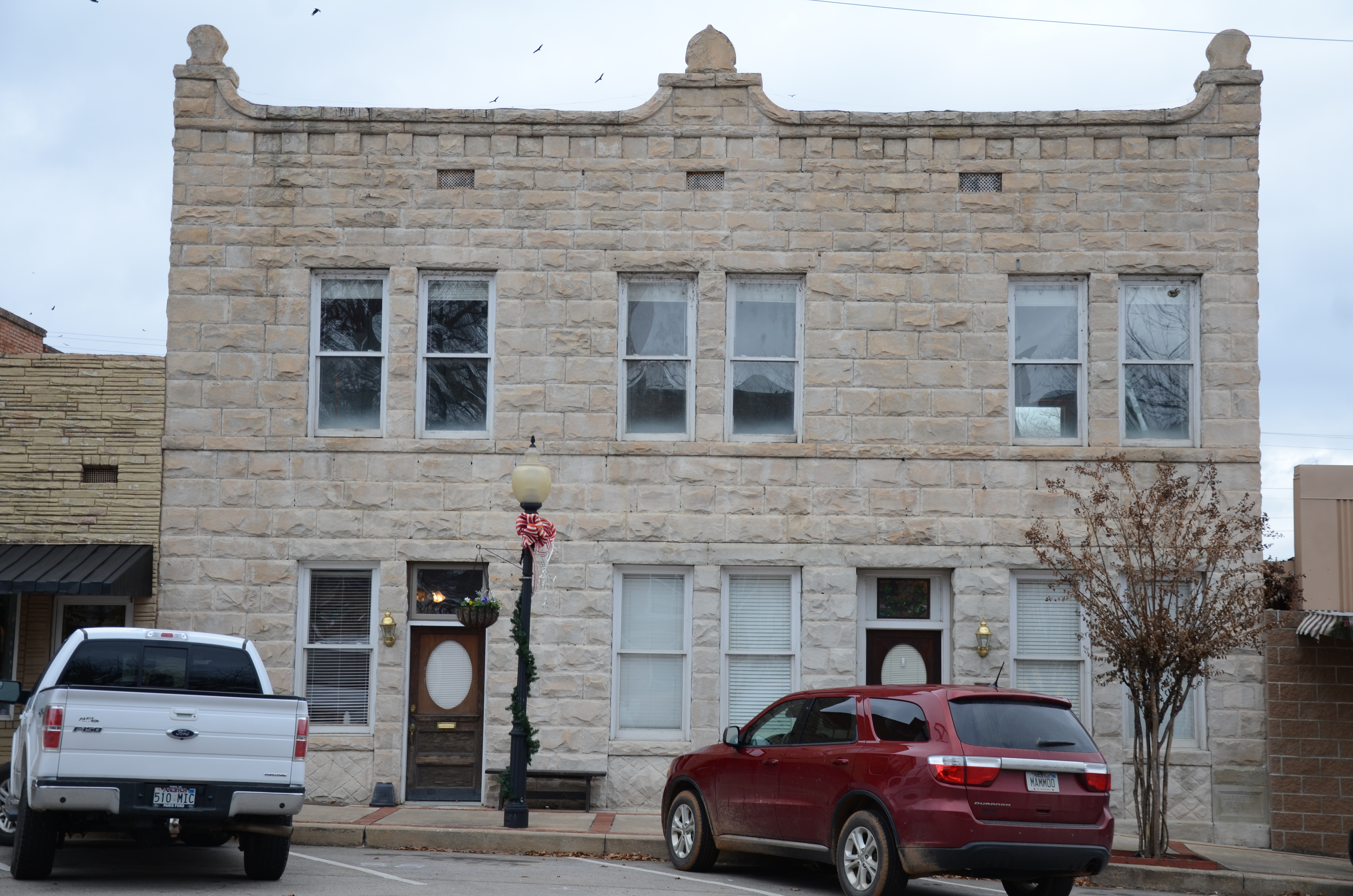

- Location within Arkansas Location within the United States
- Nearest city: Ozark, Arkansas
- Coordinates: 35°29′10″N 93°49′33″W
- Area: less than one acre
- Built: 1909
- Built by: J. Friese
- Architectural style: Early Commercial
- Part of: Ozark Courthouse Square Historic District (ID02001599)
- NRHP reference No.: 99000225

Significant dates
- Added to NRHP: February 18, 1999
- Designated CP: December 27, 2002

The Bristow Hotel is a historic commercial building in 112 South 2nd Street in Ozark, Arkansas. It is a two-story stone structure, finished in rusticated ashlar limestone. It was built in 1909 for George Bristow, a local resident, and has retained many of its internal finishes despite conversion to professional offices. The building is one of the few built in Ozark out of local limestone.

The building was listed on the National Register of Historic Places in 1999.

== See also ==
- National Register of Historic Places listings in Franklin County, Arkansas
