= Ozark station (Arkansas) =

- Missouri-Pacific Depot-Ozark
- U.S. National Register of Historic Places
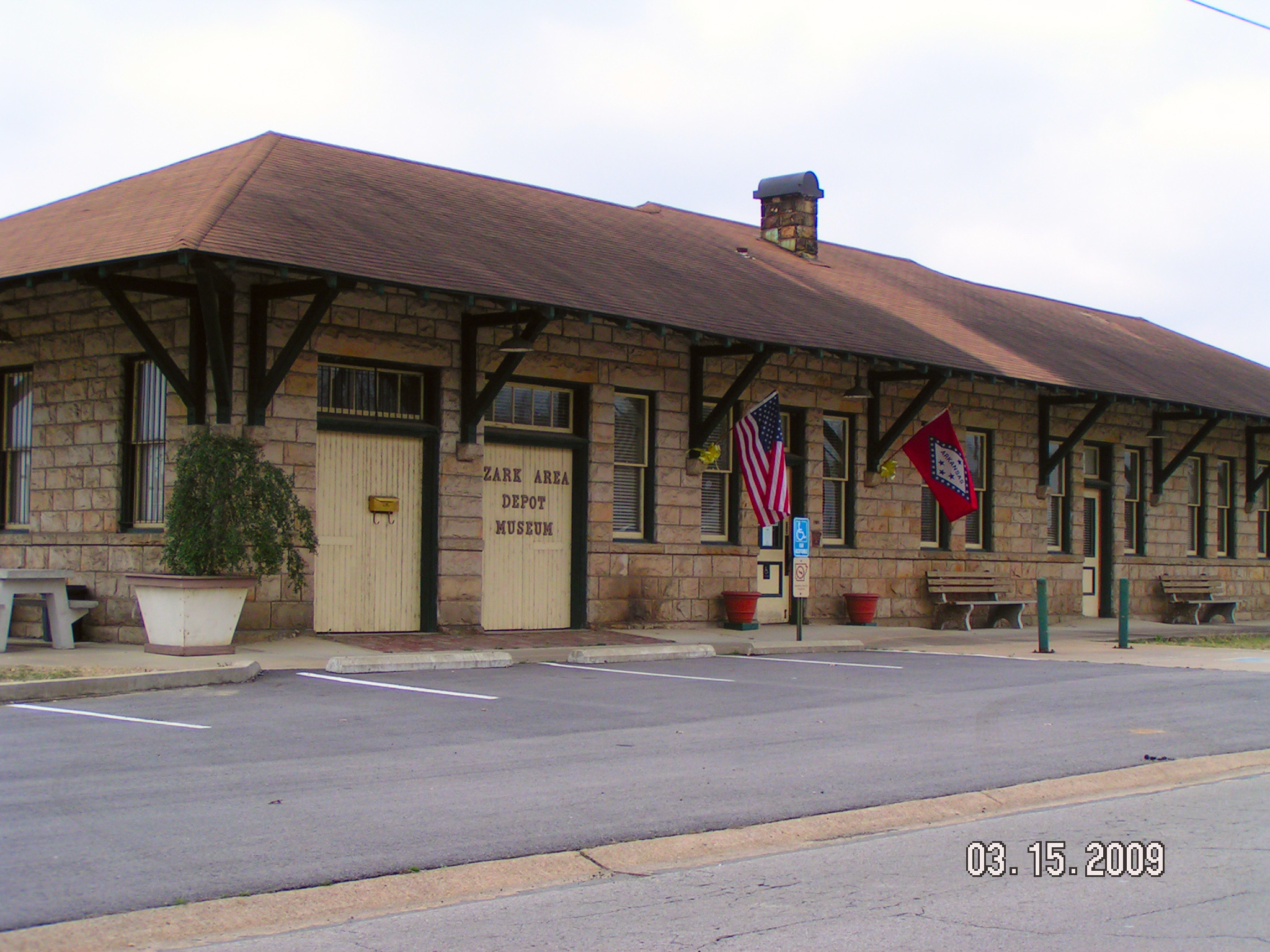

- Location within Arkansas Location within the United States
- Location: S of jct. of River and First Sts., Ozark, Arkansas
- Coordinates: 35°29′6″N 93°49′31″W
- Area: less than one acre
- Built: 1910
- Built by: Missouri-Pacific Railroad
- Architectural style: Bungalow/American craftsman, Plain Traditional
- MPS: Historic Railroad Depots of Arkansas MPS
- NRHP reference No.: 92000598
- Added to NRHP: June 11, 1992

The Missouri-Pacific Depot, Ozark, now the Ozark Area Depot Museum, is a historic railroad station and museum at 1st and River Streets in Ozark, Arkansas. It is a roughly rectangular stone structure with a hip roof, standing between River Street and the railroad tracks. On its southern (rail-facing) side a telegrapher's booth projects. The roof has broad eaves extending around the building, supported by large Craftsman-style knee braces, and with exposed rafters visible. The station was built in 1910 by the Missouri-Pacific Railroad, and is notable for its association with the economically important railroad, and for its fine Craftsman architecture. It is now a local history museum.

The building was listed on the National Register of Historic Places in 1992.

== See also ==
- National Register of Historic Places listings in Franklin County, Arkansas
