= Ozark Courthouse Square Historic District (Ozark, Arkansas) =

Historic district in Arkansas, United States

- U.S. National Register of Historic Places
- U.S. Historic district
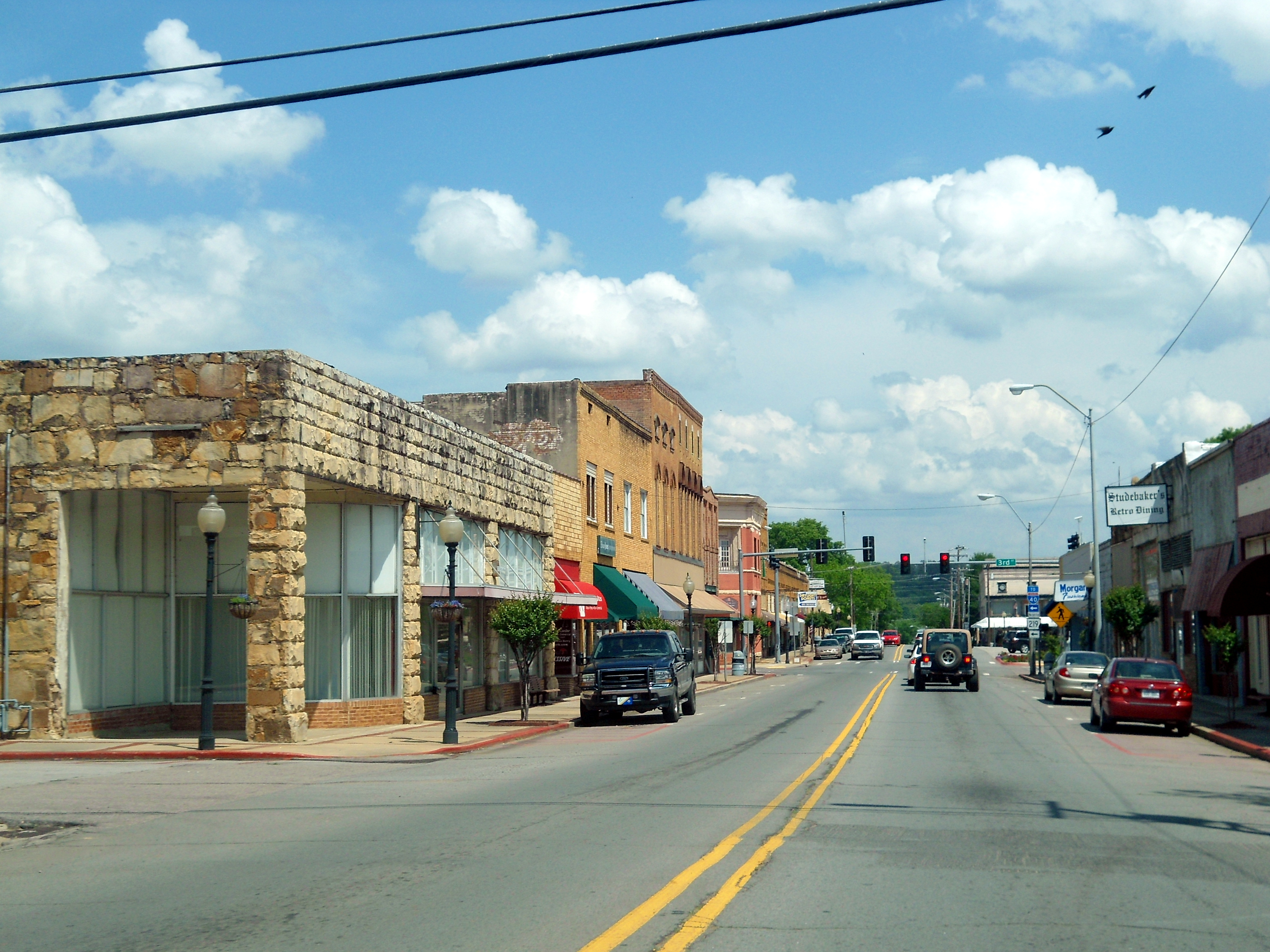

- Location within Arkansas Location within the United States
- Location: Roughly W. Commercial, W. Main, 2nd and 3rd St., Courthouse Sq., Ozark, Arkansas
- Coordinates: 35.48647°N 93.82681°W
- Area: less than one acre
- Architect: Frank Gibbs, J. Frieze, et al
- Architectural style: Italianate, Early Commercial
- NRHP reference No.: 02001599
- Added to NRHP: December 27, 2002

The Ozark Courthouse Square Historic District encompasses the historic late 19th-century center of Ozark, Arkansas. It includes an area two blocks by two blocks in area, bounded on the west by 4th Street, the north by West Commercial Street (United States Route 64), the east by 2nd Street, and the south by West Main Street. Most of the buildings in the district were built between about 1890 and 1930, a period of significant growth occasioned by the arrival of the railroad, and are built either out of brick or locally quarried stone. Prominent buildings include the Franklin County Courthouse and the Bristow Hotel.

The district was listed on the National Register of Historic Places in 2002.

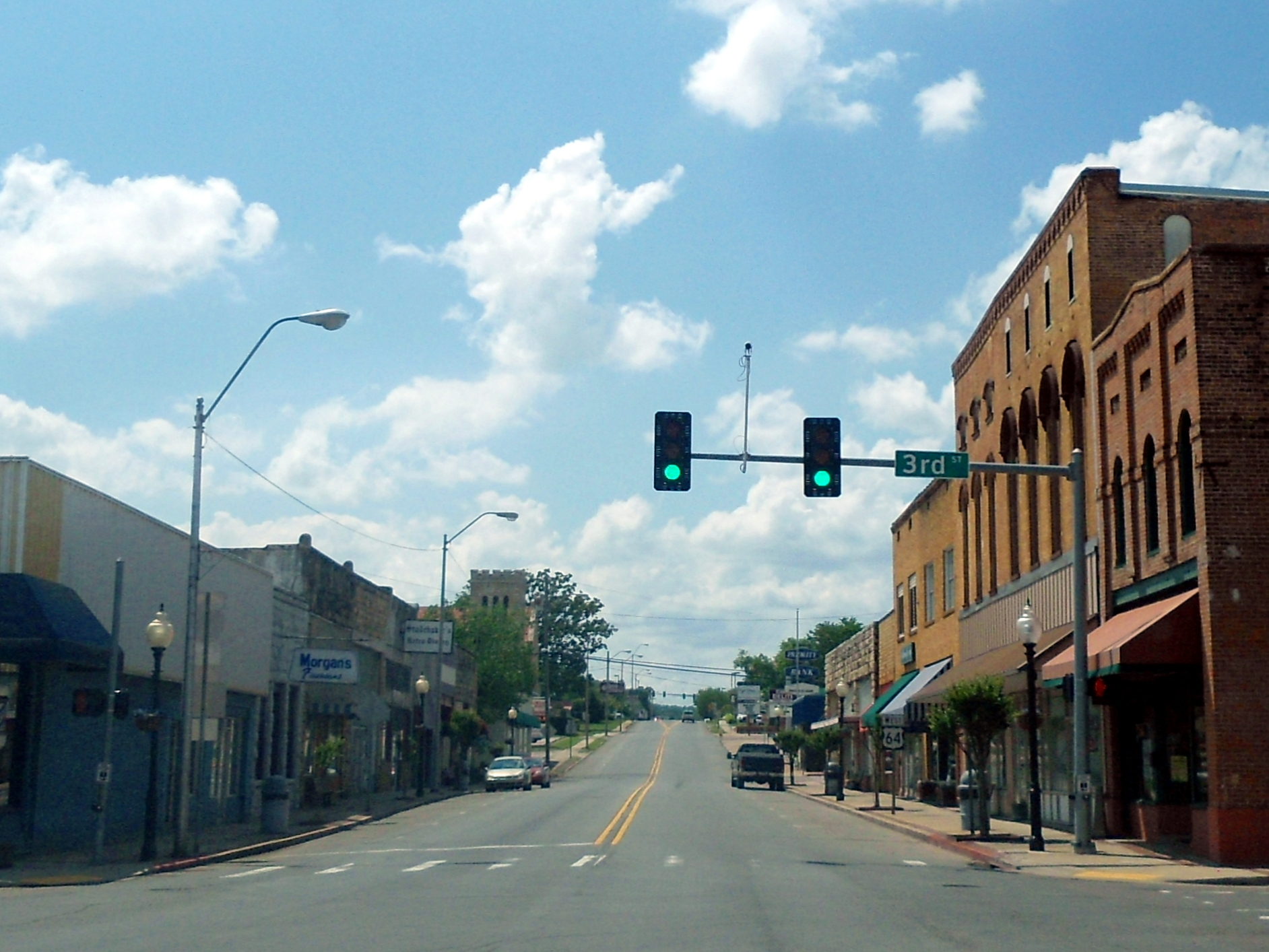
Downtown Ozark, AR on US Route 64/Hwy. 23 facing west. May 2013

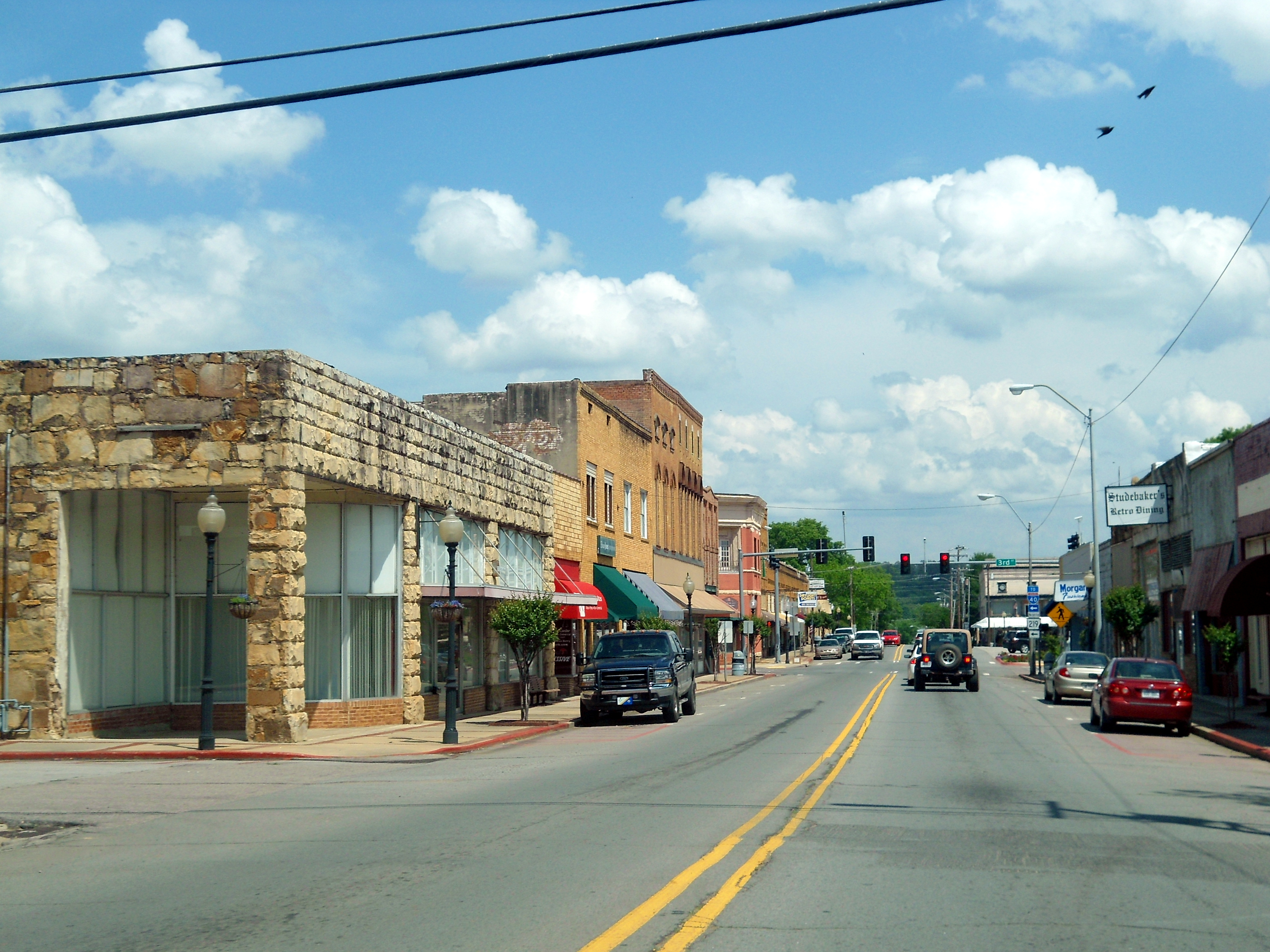
Downtown Ozark, AR on US Route 64/Hwy. 23 facing east. May 2013

== See also ==
- National Register of Historic Places listings in Franklin County, Arkansas
