= Kingston, Arkansas =

- Census-designated place
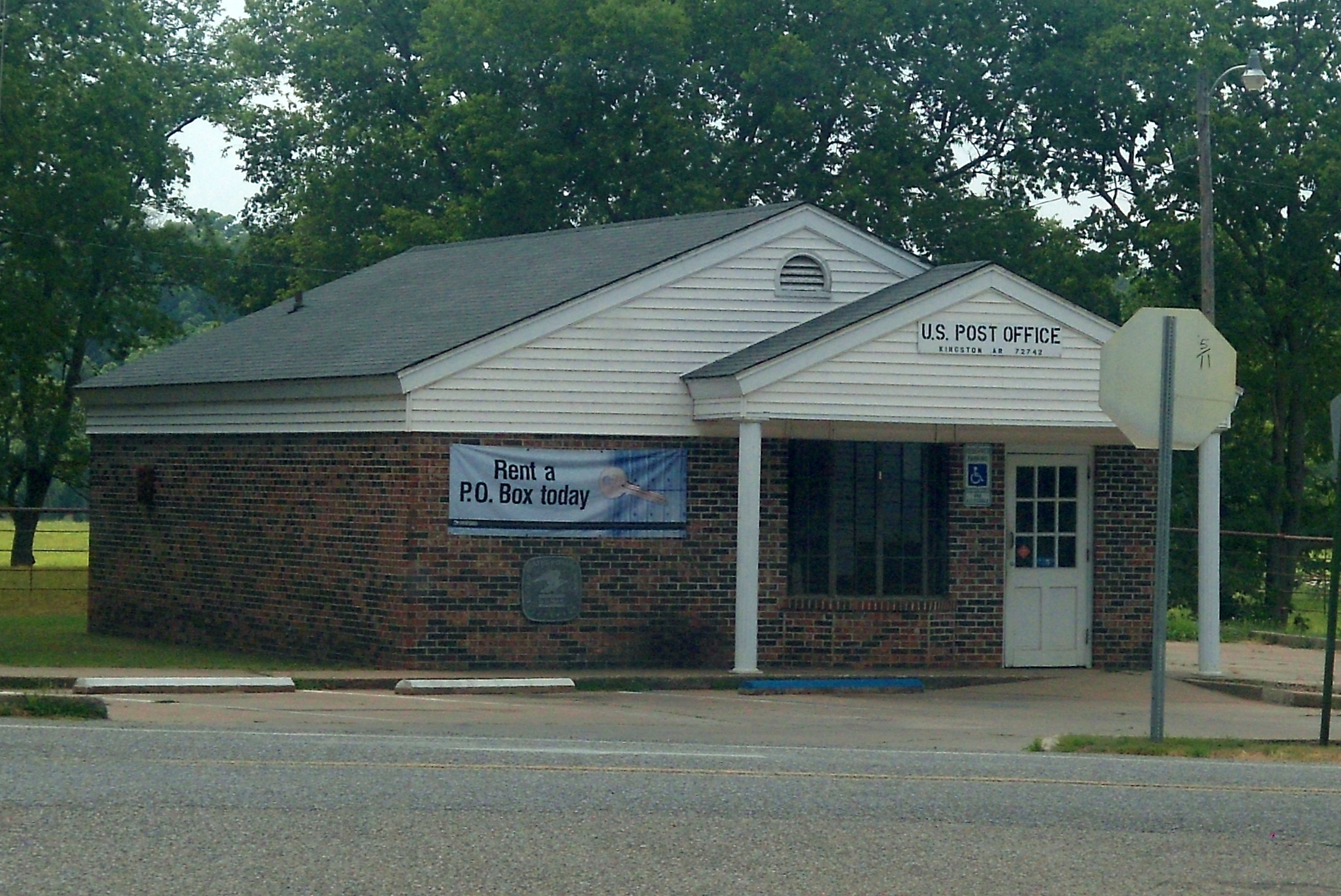
- Kingston Post Office

- Location within Arkansas Location within the United States
- Coordinates: 36°03′07″N 93°30′55″W
- Country: United States
- State: Arkansas
- County: Madison

Area
  - Total: 1.60 sq mi (4.1 km^{2})
  - Land: 1.59 sq mi (4.1 km^{2})
  - Water: 0.013 sq mi (0.034 km^{2})
- Elevation: 1,371 ft (418 m)

Population (2020)
  - Total: 97
  - Density: 61/sq mi (24/km^{2})
- Time zone: UTC-6 (Central (CST))
  - Summer (DST): UTC-5 (CDT)
- ZIP Code: 72742
- GNIS feature ID: 2805657
- FIPS code: 05-36910

Kingston is an unincorporated community and census-designated place (CDP) in northeast Madison County, Arkansas, United States. It was first listed as a CDP in the 2020 census with a population of 97.

Kingston was platted in 1853 by King Johnson, and named for him.

== Geography ==
Kingston is located at the intersection of Arkansas highways 21 and 74. It is 18 miles (29 km) east of Huntsville, the Madison county seat, by Highway 74, and 35 miles (56 km) southwest of Harrison. Kingston is located in the Kings River valley. The stream forms the western edge of the CDP and flows north to the White River in Missouri.

== Education ==
Public education for elementary and secondary school students is provided by the Jasper School District, which includes:

- Kingston Elementary School, serving kindergarten through grade 6.
- Kingston High School, serving grades 7 through 12.

On July 1, 2004, the Kingston School District, along with the Oark School District, merged into the Jasper district.

== Demographics ==
Historical population
| Census | Pop. | Note | %± |
|---|---|---|---|
| 2020 | 97 | | — |
U.S. Decennial Census; 2020

=== 2020 census ===
Kingston CDP, Arkansas – Demographic Profile (NH = Non-Hispanic) Note: the US Census treats Hispanic/Latino as an ethnic category. This table excludes Latinos from the racial categories and assigns them to a separate category. Hispanics/Latinos may be of any race.
| Race / Ethnicity | Pop 2020 | % 2020 |
|---|---|---|
| White alone (NH) | 81 | 83.51% |
| Black or African American alone (NH) | 0 | 0.00% |
| Native American or Alaska Native alone (NH) | 0 | 0.00% |
| Asian alone (NH) | 0 | 0.00% |
| Pacific Islander alone (NH) | 0 | 0.00% |
| Some Other Race alone (NH) | 0 | 0.00% |
| Mixed Race/Multi-Racial (NH) | 12 | 12.37% |
| Hispanic or Latino (any race) | 4 | 4.12% |
| Total | 97 | 100.00% |
