= Kingston High School (Arkansas) =

Location
- 300 School Street; Kingston, Arkansas 72742; United States; 36°3′14″N 93°30′58″W

Information
- School type: Public (government funded)
- Status: Open
- School district: Jasper School District
- NCES District ID: 0508240
- Authority: Arkansas Department of Education (ADE)
- CEEB code: 040230
- NCES School ID: 050824000564
- Teaching staff: 42.39 (FTE)
- Grades: 7–12
- Enrollment: 100 (2023-2024)
- Student to teacher ratio: 2.36
- Education system: ADE Smart Core curriculum
- Classes offered: Regular, Advanced Placement
- Campus type: Rural
- Colors: Blue and gold
- Athletics: Basketball, track and field
- Athletics conference: 1A West (2012–14)
- Mascot: Yellowjacket
- Team name: Kingston Yellowjackets
- Accreditation: ADE
- Affiliation: Arkansas Activities Association
- Website: www.jasper.k12.ar.us/o/kingston

Kingston High School is a comprehensive public high school serving students in grades 7 through 12 in the rural community of Kingston, Madison County, Arkansas, United States. It is only high school administered in Madison County by the Jasper School District.

It was previously a part of the Kingston School District. On July 1, 2004, the Kingston district, along with the Oark School District, merged into the Jasper district.

== Academics ==
This Title I school is accredited by the Arkansas Department of Education (ADE). The assumed course of study follows the ADE Smart Core curriculum, which requires students to complete at least 22 credit units before graduation. Students engage in regular (core and career focus) courses and exams and may select Advanced Placement (AP) coursework and exams that may lead to college credit.

== Athletics ==
The Kingston High School mascot and athletic emblem is the Yellowjacket with the school colors of blue and gold.

The Kingston Yellowjackets participate in various interscholastic activities in the 1A Classification within the 1A West Conference as administered by the Arkansas Activities Association. The Yellowjackets school athletic activities include basketball (boys/girls) and track and field (boys/girls).
