= Oark, Arkansas =

- Census-designated place
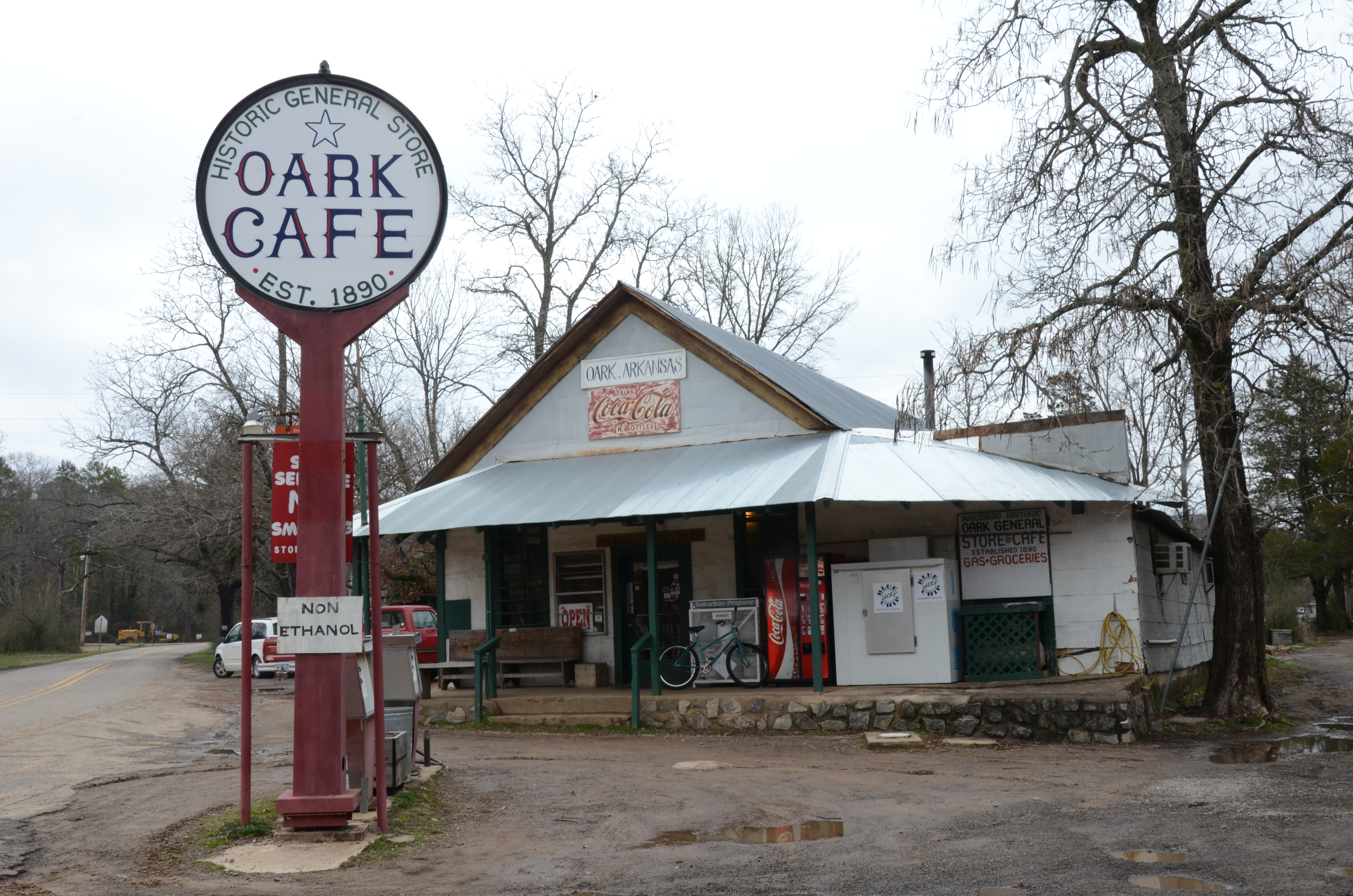
- Oark General Store

- Location within Arkansas Location within the United States
- Coordinates: 35°41′32″N 93°34′24″W
- Country: United States
- State: Arkansas
- County: Johnson
- Elevation: 1,030 ft (310 m)

Population (2020)
  - Total: 43
- Time zone: UTC-6 (Central (CST))
  - Summer (DST): UTC-5 (CDT)
- ZIP code: 72852
- Area code: 479
- GNIS feature ID: 2805670

Oark is an unincorporated community and census-designated place (CDP) in Johnson County, Arkansas, United States. Oark is located on Arkansas Highway 215, 16 miles (26 km) northwest of Clarksville. It was first listed as a CDP in the 2020 census with a population of 43.

Oark has a post office with ZIP Code 72852. The community is surrounded by the Ozark National Forest with the scenic Mulberry River nearby. The origin of the town’s name is unknown, although many believe it came from French trappers that frequented this isolated valley in the 18th century.

== History ==
The Mulberry River valley has been the site of human habitation for thousands of years. Archeologists believe that bluff-dwelling cultures thrived here as late as 500 B.C., and later the Osage Indians claimed the valleys drained by the Mulberry River as part of their hunting grounds. French trappers frequented the area as far back as the mid-17th century.

== Education ==
Public education for elementary and secondary school students is provided by the Jasper School District, which includes:

- Oark Elementary School, serving grades K-6.
- Oark High School, serving grades 7-12.

The campus is also the site of the "Tri-Centennial Tree" - an ancient southern red oak estimated to be over 300 years old. There is a historic marker on Highway 215 in front of the school commemorating the dedication of the tree in 2012.

On July 1, 2004, the Oark School District, along with the Kingston School District, merged into the Jasper district.

== Demographics ==
Historical population
Census	Pop.	Note	%±
2020	43		—
U.S. Decennial Census; 2020

=== 2020 census ===
Oark CDP, Arkansas – Demographic Profile (NH = Non-Hispanic)
Race / Ethnicity	Pop 2020	% 2020
White alone (NH)	37	86.05%
Black or African American alone (NH)	0	0.00%
Native American or Alaska Native alone (NH)	1	2.33%
Asian alone (NH)	0	0.00%
Pacific Islander alone (NH)	0	0.00%
Some Other Race alone (NH)	0	0.00%
Mixed Race/Multi-Racial (NH)	5	11.63%
Hispanic or Latino (any race)	0	0.00%
Total	43	100.00%

Note: the US Census treats Hispanic/Latino as an ethnic category. This table excludes Latinos from the racial categories and assigns them to a separate category. Hispanics/Latinos can be of any race.
