= Mulberry River Bridge (Turner's Bend, Arkansas) =

- U.S. National Register of Historic Places
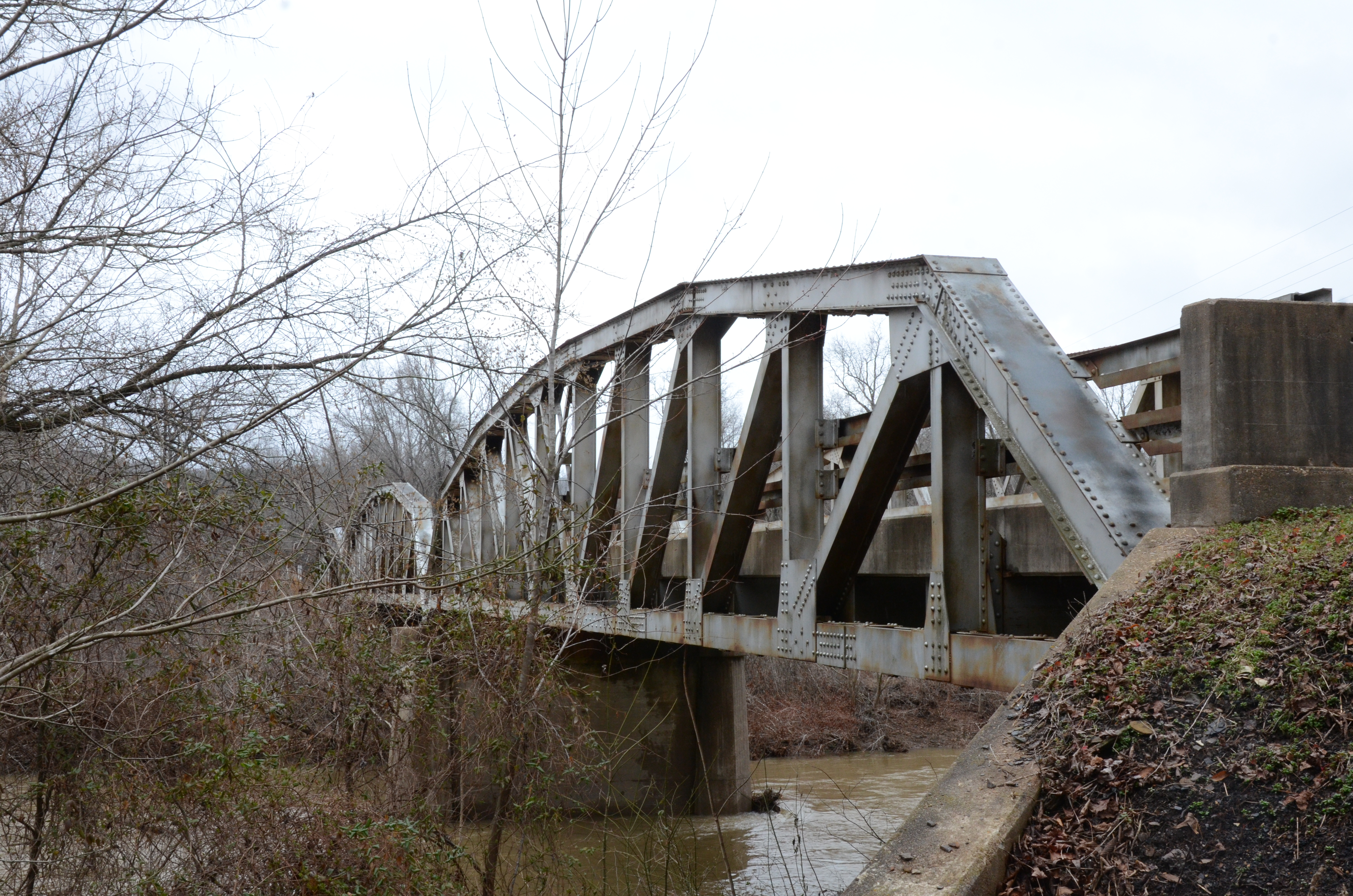

- Location within Arkansas Location within the United States
- Nearest city: Turner's Bend, Arkansas
- Coordinates: 35°40′18″N 93°49′46″W
- Built: 1935
- Architect: McEachin & McEachin, Inc.
- Architectural style: Parker Pony truss
- MPS: Historic Bridges of Arkansas MPS
- NRHP reference No.: 06001275
- Added to NRHP: January 24, 2007

The Mulberry River Bridge is a historic bridge, carrying Arkansas Highway 23 over the Mulberry River in northern Franklin County, Arkansas. It is a Parker pony truss bridge, with three spans and a total structure length of 446 feet (136 m). The main span is 112 feet (34 m) long, and the bridge has a deck width of 20 feet (6.1 m). The bridge was built in 1935, and is one of a small number of surviving multi-span pony truss bridges in the state.

The bridge was listed on the National Register of Historic Places in 2007.

== See also ==
- Mulberry River Bridge (Pleasant Hill, Arkansas)
