= Pleasant Hill, Crawford County, Arkansas =

Pleasant Hill, Arkansas
- Neighborhood
- Location within Arkansas
- Coordinates: 35°31′18″N 94°02′57″W
- Country: United States
- State: Arkansas
- County: Crawford
- Elevation: 459 ft (140 m)
- Time zone: UTC-6 (Central (CST))
  - Summer (DST): UTC-5 (CDT)
- Area code: 479
- GNIS feature ID: 73125

Pleasant Hill is a neighborhood of Mulberry, Arkansas, United States, which was once a separate community. Pleasant Hill is the nearest community to the Mulberry River Bridge, which is listed on the National Register of Historic Places.
