= Jasper School District =

School district in Arkansas, United States

Address
- 600 School Street Jasper, Arkansas, 72641; United States

District information
- Type: Public
- Grades: PreK–12
- NCES District ID: 0508240

Students and staff
- Students: 803
- Teachers: 98.62
- Staff: 86.58
- Student–teacher ratio: 8.14

Other information
- Website: www.jasper.k12.ar.us

Jasper Public School District 1 is a public school district based in Jasper, Arkansas, United States. The school district supports early childhood, elementary and secondary education for more than 900 students in prekindergarten through grade 12 and employs more than 200 educators and staff at its six schools and district offices.

Jasper is geographically one of the state's largest school districts and encompasses 612.59 square miles (1,586.6 km^{2}) of land in Newton, Johnson, Madison, Franklin, and Carroll counties.

== History ==
In 1980 the Newton County School District dissolved, with a portion going to the Jasper district.

On July 1, 2004, the Kingston School District and the Oark School District merged into the Jasper district. The consolidation gave the new Jasper school district a low population density, so it qualified for extra state funding. Circa 2006 it collected an extra $711,000 meant for isolated school districts. Around the time the Jasper district was considered to be having financial problems.

== Schools ==
Elementary education:

- Jasper Elementary School, located in Jasper, Newton County serving prekindergarten through grade 6.
- Kingston Elementary School, located in Kingston, Madison County serving prekindergarten through grade 6.
- Oark Elementary School, located in Oark, Johnson County serving kindergarten through grade 6.

Secondary education:

- Jasper High School, located in Jasper, Newton County serving grades 7 through 12.
- Kingston High School, located in Kingston, Madison County serving grades 7 through 12.
- Oark High School, located in Oark, Johnson County serving grades 7 through 12.
