= Altus-Denning School District =

Defunct school district in Arkansas, United States

Location
- Arkansas; United States

District information
- Closed: July 1, 2004 (became part of Ozark School District)

Altus-Denning School District No. 31 was a school district in Arkansas, serving Altus and Denning. It operated one school, the Altus-Denning School.

The school building was in Altus; it was administratively divided between an elementary school and a high school.

On July 1, 2004, it consolidated into the Ozark School District.
