= Mulberry–Pleasant View Bi-County School District =

School district in Arkansas

Mulberry/Pleasant View Bi-County School District

Location
- 203 West Fifth Street; Mulberry, Arkansas 72947-0483 United States

District information
- Grades: K–12
- Accreditation: Arkansas Department of Education
- Schools: 4
- NCES District ID: 0504560

Students and staff
- Students: 401
- Teachers: 39.55 (on FTE basis)
- Staff: 92.55 (on FTE basis)
- Student–teacher ratio: 10.14
- District mascot: Yellow Jacket
- Colors: Black; Gold

Other information
- Website: www.mpvschools.com

Mulberry–Pleasant View Bi-County School District is a public school district based in Mulberry, Arkansas. The school district encompasses 120.83 square miles (312.9 km^{2}) of land, including portions of Franklin County and Crawford County serving all or portions of communities including Mulberry, Ozark, Alma, and Dyer.

The district proves comprehensive education for more than 400 pre-kindergarten through grade 12 students while employing more than 100 teachers and staff. The district and its schools are accredited by the Arkansas Department of Education.

== History ==
On July 1, 2004 the district was established by the consolidation of the Mulberry School District and the Pleasant View School District.

== Schools ==
- Mulberry High School, located in Mulberry and serving more than 90 students in grades 10 through 12.
- Pleasant View Junior High School, located in Ozark and serving more than 100 students in grades 7 through 9.
- Millsap Intermediate School, located in Ozark and serving more than 50 students in grades 5 and 6.
- Marvin Primary School, located in Mulberry and serving more than 150 students in kindergarten through grade 4.
