= Ozark, Arkansas =

- City
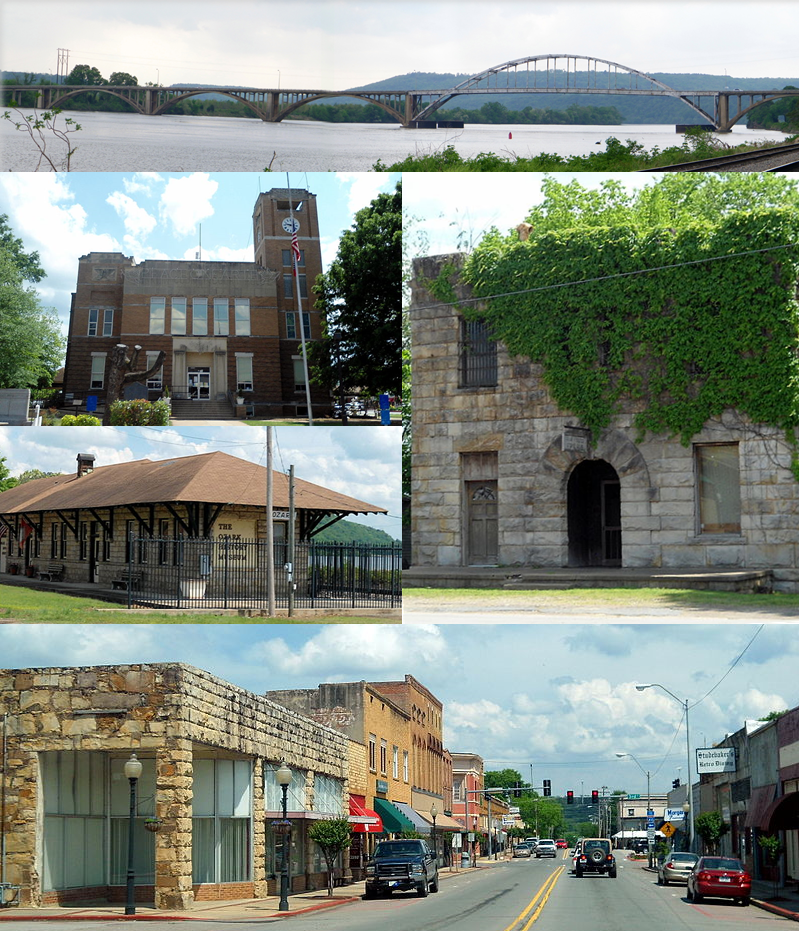
- Clockwise, from top: Highway 23 bridge over the Arkansas River, historic Franklin County Jail, Ozark Courthouse Square Historic District, Ozark Depot, Franklin County Courthouse
- Motto: "Where it all begins"
- Location of Ozark in Franklin County, Arkansas.
- Coordinates: 35°29′57″N 93°50′37″W
- Country: United States
- State: Arkansas
- County: Franklin

Area
  - Total: 7.98 sq mi (20.66 km^{2})
  - Land: 7.93 sq mi (20.54 km^{2})
  - Water: 0.042 sq mi (0.11 km^{2})
- Elevation: 476 ft (145 m)

Population (2020)
  - Total: 3,542
  - Estimate (2025): 3,628 ▲
  - Density: 446.6/sq mi (172.43/km^{2})
- Time zone: UTC−06:00 (Central (CST))
  - Summer (DST): UTC−05:00 (CDT)
- ZIP Code: 72949
- Area code: 479
- FIPS code: 05-52970
- GNIS feature ID: 2404457
- Website: www.cityofozarkar.com

Ozark is a city in Franklin County, Arkansas, United States, and one of the county's two seats of government. The community is located along the Arkansas River in the Arkansas River Valley on the southern edge of the Ozark Mountains. As of the 2020 census it had a population of 3,542.

Incorporated in 1850, Ozark is adjacent to much of Arkansas wine country, and contains a bridge to cross the Arkansas River for travelers heading to points south. The city is also located on Arkansas Highway 23, nicknamed the Pig Trail Scenic Byway, known for its steep drops, sharp curves and scenic mountain views.

The name Aux Arcs, later simplified to "Ozark", was given to this bend of the river by the French explorers when they were mapping out this land.

== History ==
Native Americans roamed the area freely before Arkansas was a territory. The Cherokee and Osage lived in this area that would later become attractive to settlers. The Ozark area was frequented by French fur trappers and served as a landmark during European exploration of the area. It was these adventurous souls who gave the area and the rolling mountains that rise there their name, Aux Arcs.

Included in the Louisiana Purchase of 1803, the vicinity became a stopping and crossing point along the Arkansas River. The modern settlement of Ozark was established here in the 1830s, and an important road grew connecting Ozark to Fayetteville, Arkansas, following the route of today's Pig Trail Scenic Byway to connect Northwest Arkansas with the river.

Ozark played a role on the Trail of Tears. Steamboats would often stop here in times of low water and Native Americans camped in Ozark before moving to Oklahoma on foot. The waterfront is a designated stop on the Trail of Tears route.

Ozark's population grew to about 100 people during the Civil War and served as a Confederate base after the battles of Pea Ridge and Prairie Grove in 1862. In April 1863, Brigadier General William L. Cabell led 900 men from Ozark on an expedition that ended at the Battle of Fayetteville. Ozark became the scene of fighting later that year and again in 1864, where many skirmishes were fought in the vicinity. A monument on the grounds of the Franklin County Courthouse pays tribute to an officer killed just north of town.

Although Ozark prospered over the years, it remained a small city on the river.

The name "Ozark" comes from Aux Arcs, the name given to the area and the mountains that rise there by early French settlers. Ozark, Arkansas, was the first community to be incorporated with that name.

== Geography ==
Ozark is located east of the center of Franklin County on the north side of the Arkansas River. It is 48 miles (77 km) west of Russellville and 38 miles (61 km) east of Fort Smith. The city limits extend north to Interstate 40, which has access from Exits 35 and 37. U.S. Route 64 passes through the center of Ozark, providing a local east-west route parallel to I-40. Arkansas Highway 23 leads north as the Pig Trail Scenic Byway into the Ozarks 28 miles (45 km) to Brashears, while to the south AR 23 crosses the Arkansas River and leads 28 miles (45 km) to Booneville.

According to the United States Census Bureau, Ozark has a total area of 7.3 square miles (19.0 km^{2}), of which 7.3 square miles (18.9 km^{2}) is land and 0.04 square miles (0.1 km^{2}), or 0.52%, is water. Ozark is the point at which the Arkansas River is farthest north in the state.

=== Climate ===
The climate in this area is characterized by hot, humid summers and generally mild to cool winters. According to the Köppen Climate Classification system, Ozark has a humid subtropical climate, abbreviated "Cfa" on climate maps. On August 10, 1936, Ozark recorded the highest temperature ever in Arkansas at 120 °F (48.9 °C).

Climate data for Ozark, Arkansas, 1991–2020 normals, extremes 1892–present
Month	Jan	Feb	Mar	Apr	May	Jun	Jul	Aug	Sep	Oct	Nov	Dec	Year
Record high °F (°C)	81 (27)	86 (30)	94 (34)	95 (35)	99 (37)	108 (42)	116 (47)	120 (49)	110 (43)	104 (40)	87 (31)	82 (28)	120 (49)
Mean maximum °F (°C)	69.0 (20.6)	72.6 (22.6)	80.6 (27.0)	85.7 (29.8)	90.1 (32.3)	94.1 (34.5)	99.2 (37.3)	99.6 (37.6)	94.5 (34.7)	87.4 (30.8)	76.3 (24.6)	69.7 (20.9)	101.1 (38.4)
Mean daily maximum °F (°C)	48.3 (9.1)	53.6 (12.0)	62.3 (16.8)	71.4 (21.9)	78.9 (26.1)	87.4 (30.8)	91.9 (33.3)	91.4 (33.0)	84.2 (29.0)	73.0 (22.8)	60.6 (15.9)	50.5 (10.3)	71.1 (21.8)
Daily mean °F (°C)	38.3 (3.5)	42.6 (5.9)	50.9 (10.5)	59.5 (15.3)	68.0 (20.0)	76.5 (24.7)	80.8 (27.1)	80.1 (26.7)	73.0 (22.8)	61.6 (16.4)	49.9 (9.9)	41.0 (5.0)	60.2 (15.7)
Mean daily minimum °F (°C)	28.3 (−2.1)	31.6 (−0.2)	39.4 (4.1)	47.6 (8.7)	57.2 (14.0)	65.6 (18.7)	69.7 (20.9)	68.7 (20.4)	61.7 (16.5)	50.2 (10.1)	39.1 (3.9)	31.5 (−0.3)	49.2 (9.6)
Mean minimum °F (°C)	12.9 (−10.6)	17.0 (−8.3)	22.6 (−5.2)	32.7 (0.4)	42.2 (5.7)	55.3 (12.9)	61.4 (16.3)	60.0 (15.6)	47.3 (8.5)	33.9 (1.1)	23.9 (−4.5)	16.8 (−8.4)	9.9 (−12.3)
Record low °F (°C)	−16 (−27)	−15 (−26)	4 (−16)	22 (−6)	32 (0)	42 (6)	48 (9)	46 (8)	32 (0)	19 (−7)	9 (−13)	−8 (−22)	−16 (−27)
Average precipitation inches (mm)	3.49 (89)	3.28 (83)	4.82 (122)	5.03 (128)	5.82 (148)	4.90 (124)	3.52 (89)	4.19 (106)	3.98 (101)	4.73 (120)	4.65 (118)	3.83 (97)	52.24 (1,325)
Average snowfall inches (cm)	1.9 (4.8)	1.0 (2.5)	0.1 (0.25)	0.0 (0.0)	0.0 (0.0)	0.0 (0.0)	0.0 (0.0)	0.0 (0.0)	0.0 (0.0)	0.0 (0.0)	0.0 (0.0)	0.4 (1.0)	3.4 (8.55)
Average precipitation days (≥ 0.01 in)	7.4	7.1	9.4	8.4	10.9	8.6	8.4	7.5	6.3	7.7	7.7	7.2	96.6
Average snowy days (≥ 0.1 in)	0.9	1.0	0.3	0.0	0.0	0.0	0.0	0.0	0.0	0.0	0.0	0.4	2.6
Source 1: NOAA (snow/snow days 1981–2010)
Source 2: NWS/XMACIS2

== Demographics ==
Historical population
Census	Pop.	Note	%±
1850	82		—
1870	210		—
1880	824		292.4%
1890	862		4.6%
1900	848		−1.6%
1910	1,146		35.1%
1920	1,262		10.1%
1930	1,564		23.9%
1940	1,402		−10.4%
1950	1,757		25.3%
1960	1,965		11.8%
1970	2,592		31.9%
1980	3,621		39.7%
1990	3,330		−8.0%
2000	3,525		5.9%
2010	3,684		4.5%
2020	3,542		−3.9%
2025 (est.)	3,628	▲	2.4%
U.S. Decennial Census

=== 2020 census ===
As of the 2020 census, Ozark had a population of 3,542. The median age was 37.2 years. 26.2% of residents were under the age of 18 and 18.4% were 65 years of age or older. For every 100 females, there were 93.8 males, and for every 100 females age 18 and over, there were 84.9 males age 18 and over.

0.0% of residents lived in urban areas, while 100.0% lived in rural areas.

There were 1,416 households, including 808 families, in Ozark. Of all households, 32.2% had children under the age of 18 living in them, 38.6% were married-couple households, 19.8% were households with a male householder and no spouse or partner present, and 33.3% were households with a female householder and no spouse or partner present. About 31.3% of all households were made up of individuals, and 14.1% had someone living alone who was 65 years of age or older.

There were 1,618 housing units, of which 12.5% were vacant. The homeowner vacancy rate was 2.3% and the rental vacancy rate was 11.1%.

Ozark racial composition
Race	Number	Percentage
White (non-Hispanic)	3,074	86.79%
Black or African American (non-Hispanic)	16	0.45%
Native American	37	1.04%
Asian	21	0.59%
Pacific Islander	1	0.03%
Other/Mixed	218	6.15%
Hispanic or Latino	175	4.94%

=== 2000 census ===
As of the census of 2000, there were 3,525 people, 1,453 households, and 940 families residing in the city. The population density was 491.6 inhabitants per square mile (189.8/km^{2}). There were 1,607 housing units at an average density of 224.1 per square mile (86.5/km^{2}). The racial makeup of the city was 96.48% White, 0.14% Black or African American, 0.68% Native American, 0.14% Asian, 0.23% Pacific Islander, 1.08% from other races, and 1.25% from two or more races. 2.55% of the population were Hispanic or Latino of any race.

There were 1,453 households, out of which 31.5% had children under the age of 18 living with them, 47.2% were married couples living together, 13.1% had a female householder with no husband present, and 35.3% were non-families. 31.2% of all households were made up of individuals, and 18.4% had someone living alone who was 65 years of age or older. The average household size was 2.33 and the average family size was 2.91.

In the city, the population was spread out, with 25.2% under the age of 18, 8.3% from 18 to 24, 25.4% from 25 to 44, 19.7% from 45 to 64, and 21.4% who were 65 years of age or older. The median age was 38 years. For every 100 females, there were 85.0 males. For every 100 females age 18 and over, there were 80.6 males.

The median income for a household in the city was $26,057, and the median income for a family was $31,537. Males had a median income of $25,409 versus $17,353 for females. The per capita income for the city was $12,583. About 17.9% of families and 21.6% of the population were below the poverty line, including 24.9% of those under age 18 and 19.8% of those age 65 or over.

== Education ==
Public education for elementary and secondary school students is provided by the two school districts:

- Ozark School District leading to graduation at Ozark High School.
- Mulberry–Pleasant View Bi-County School District leading to graduation at Mulberry High School via Millsap Intermediate School (grades 5-6) and Pleasant View Junior High (grades 7-9) both located in Ozark.

Ozark is the home of Arkansas Tech University–Ozark Campus, a two-year satellite campus of Arkansas Tech University in Russellville, Arkansas. Arkansas Tech-Ozark is one of the region's leading providers of career and technical education, offering several associate degrees and technical certificates, as well as general studies classes. The campus was established in 1965 as Arkansas Valley Vocational Technical School (AVVTS). In 1975, the Arkansas State Board of Education/Vocational Education granted accreditation to AVVTS, making it the first school of its kind in the state to receive that distinction. In 1991, the campus was renamed Arkansas Valley Technical Institute (AVTI). On July 1, 2003, AVTI merged with Arkansas Tech University to become Arkansas Tech University–Ozark Campus.

== Tourism ==
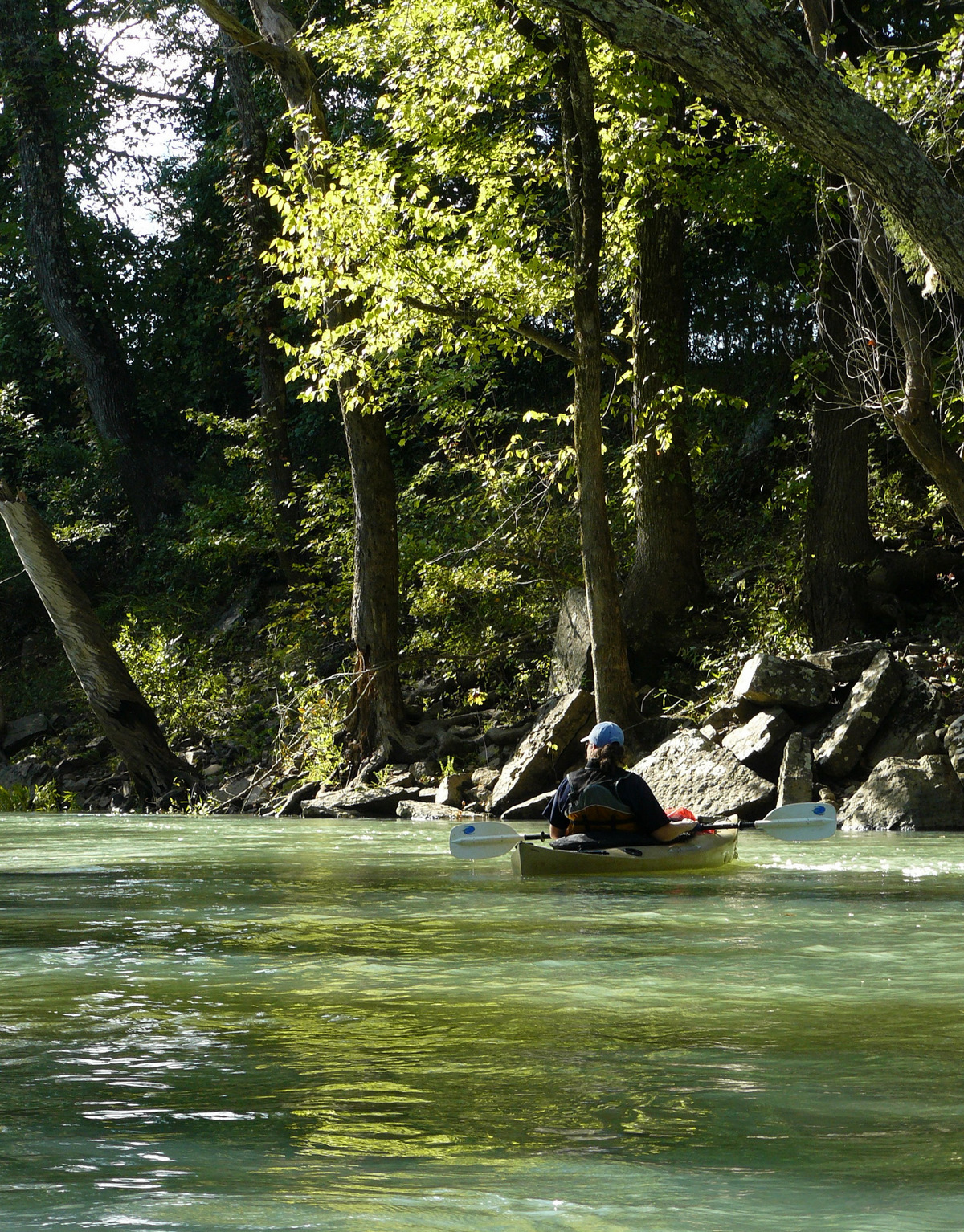
Kayaking on the Mulberry River

Downtown Ozark features a number of historic sites. Among these is the old Missouri Pacific Depot, which now serves as a museum and houses many artifacts related to the city's history. Murals can be found throughout the city. The quintessential square is filled with window store fronts full of antique and gift shops, crape myrtle shrubs in bloom summer through fall, and a park across from the courthouse.

The old Franklin County Jail features a distinctive stone facade, resembling a medieval castle.

The city serves as the southern access point for the Pig Trail Scenic Byway. This 19-mile (31 km) scenic drive begins 11 miles (18 km) north of Ozark where Highway 23 enters the Ozark National Forest. The Pig Trail leads drivers through rolling mountain country and past waterfalls, rock formations and the Mulberry River, popular for kayaking and canoeing. Ozark is a popular place for food and rest while exploring the Pig Trail Scenic Byway.

Ozark Lake on the Arkansas River provides plenty of fishing opportunities. Tree-shaded Aux Arc Park stretches along the river from the Ozark Lock and Dam and has a playground, campsites, boat launching ramps and other facilities. Within miles of Ozark are the Mulberry River and White Rock Mountain Recreation Area in the Ozark National Forest.

Ozark is in the heart of Arkansas Wine Country along with the cities of Altus, Wiederkehr Village, and Paris.

== Depictions in cinema ==
In the first season of the reality TV series The Simple Life, Paris Hilton and Nicole Richie worked at the Sonic Drive-In in Ozark.

On April 17, 2007, Late Late Show host Craig Ferguson mentioned Ozark during his guest appearance on the Late Show with David Letterman. While telling Dave a story about travelling the country, Craig said he had stopped in "Ozark, which is a town in Arkansas," and discovered catfish. It was the first time Ferguson had eaten catfish. He described it as being "a tasty fish". On June 14, 2007, Ferguson displayed a letter from Mayor Vernon McDaniels, making Ferguson an honorary citizen of Ozark. After becoming an honorary citizen, Ferguson set out to become an honorary citizen of as many U.S. cities as possible and later became an official U.S. citizen, all thanks to Ozark starting the trend. On June 25, 2009, Ferguson again mentioned Ozark during his opening monologue. He told his audience that Ozark was the place to stop for good catfish and described it as a "lovely town". Ferguson later financed a bond to build a $415,000 turf field for their high school football team in 2010.

== Notable people ==
- Mark H. Berry, American politician
- Roy Buchanan (1939–1988), guitar innovator was born September 23, 1939, in Ozark.
- Marshall Chrisman (born 1933), former member of the Arkansas House of Representatives from Ozark
- Minnie Rutherford Fuller, farmer, broker, temperance leader, suffragist
- Elizabeth Gracen, Miss Arkansas and Miss America 1982
- Theodore H. Laban, a highly decorated U.S. Army Air Forces soldier
- John Outlaw, a native of Ozark, football coach at Lufkin High School in Lufkin
- Leslee Milam Post (born 1973), Democratic politician who served in the 88th General Assembly of the Arkansas House of Representatives
- Joe Purdy, folk/indie recording artist
- Jesse Welles, indie/rock recording artist
- Bill Dees, songwriter. Most famous for writing Oh! Pretty Woman sung by Roy Orbison.
