= Arkansas Tech University–Ozark Campus =

Two-year college in Ozark, Arkansas, U.S.

Coordinates: 35.496985°N 93.8423°W

Arkansas Tech University Ozark Campus
- Type: Public University
- Established: 1965
- Chancellor: Bruce Sikes
- Students: 2,136
- Location: Ozark, Arkansas, U.S.
- Campus: Rural
- Colors: Green and Gold
- Website: www.atu.edu/ozark

Arkansas Tech University–Ozark Campus is a two-year satellite campus of Arkansas Tech University, located in Ozark, Arkansas, United States.

== The Campus ==
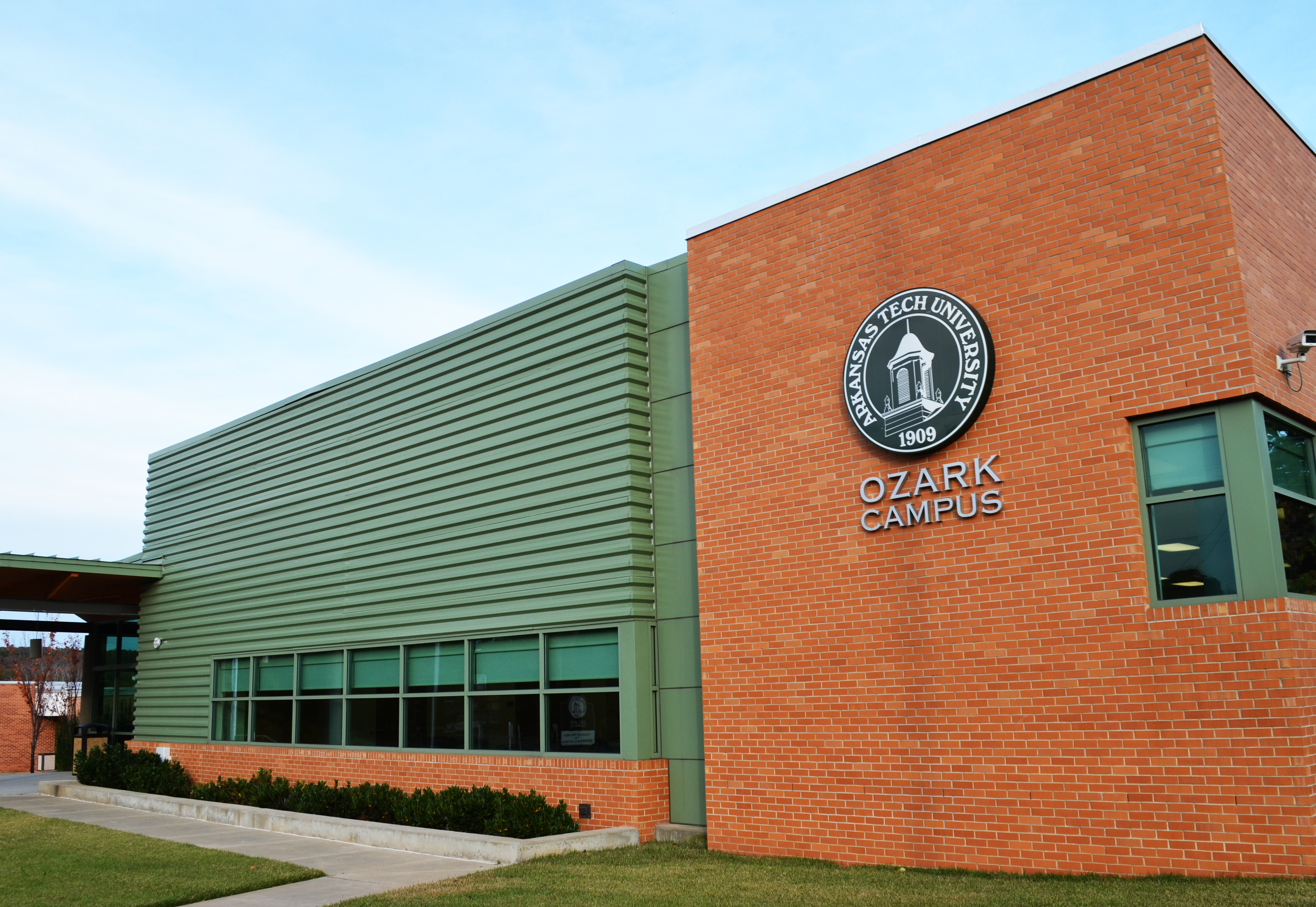
In 2009, Arkansas Tech University-Ozark Campus opened the Student Services Conference Center.

In 2009, Arkansas Tech University–Ozark Campus opened the Student Services Conference Center. The following year saw the opening the Alvin F. Vest Student Union, which includes the campus library and bookstore, as well as a computer lab, food services and lounge area.

In 2011, the Arkansas Valley Technical Center in Russellville merged with Arkansas Tech University–Ozark Campus to form the Arkansas Tech Career Center (ATCC), which offers career and technical education to students from 11 high schools in Pope, Yell and Johnson counties.

Arkansas Tech University–Ozark Campus is surrounded by a half-mile walking trail, the SGL Group Walking Trail, that features resting benches and nighttime lighting, along with a nine-hole disc golf course donated by the graduating class of 2011. The trail and course were designed to promote health and wellness for students, as well as the Ozark community. The walking trail was a result of the campus' first capital campaign, the "Path to Progress" campaign, and named after its lead donor, SGL Group: The Carbon Company.
