= Mulberry River (Arkansas) =

Coordinates: 35.7459139°N 93.4501831°W

- The Mulberry River flows through the Ozark Mountains.

Location
- Country: United States
- State: Arkansas

Physical characteristics
- Source
  - location: Newton County, Arkansas
  - elevation: 2,100 ft (640 m)
- Mouth
  - location: Arkansas River
- Length: 70 mi (110 km)
- Basin size: 373 mi^{2} (970 km^{2})
- Discharge
  - average: 557 cu ft/s (15.8 m^{3}/s)

National Wild and Scenic River
- Type: Scenic, Recreational
- Designated: April 22, 1992

The Mulberry River is a 70-mile-long (110 km) tributary of the Arkansas River in northwestern Arkansas in the United States. Via the Arkansas River, it is part of the watershed of the Mississippi River. It has been designated a National Wild and Scenic River. The drainage basin of the Mulberry River has an area of 373 square miles (970 km^{2}) and the annual average mean flow of the river near its mouth is 557 cubic feet per second.

According to the Geographic Names Information System, it has also been known as "Mulberry Creek". The United States Board on Geographic Names settled on "Mulberry River" as the stream's name in 1976.

== Course ==
The Mulberry River flows for most of its length through the Ozark National Forest in the Ozarks. It rises in southwestern Newton County and initially flows generally westwardly through Johnson and Franklin counties. In Franklin County it turns southward into the valley of the Arkansas River and flows past the town of Mulberry. It joins the Arkansas about 3 miles (5 km) south of Mulberry, on the common boundary of Franklin and Crawford counties.

== Recreation ==
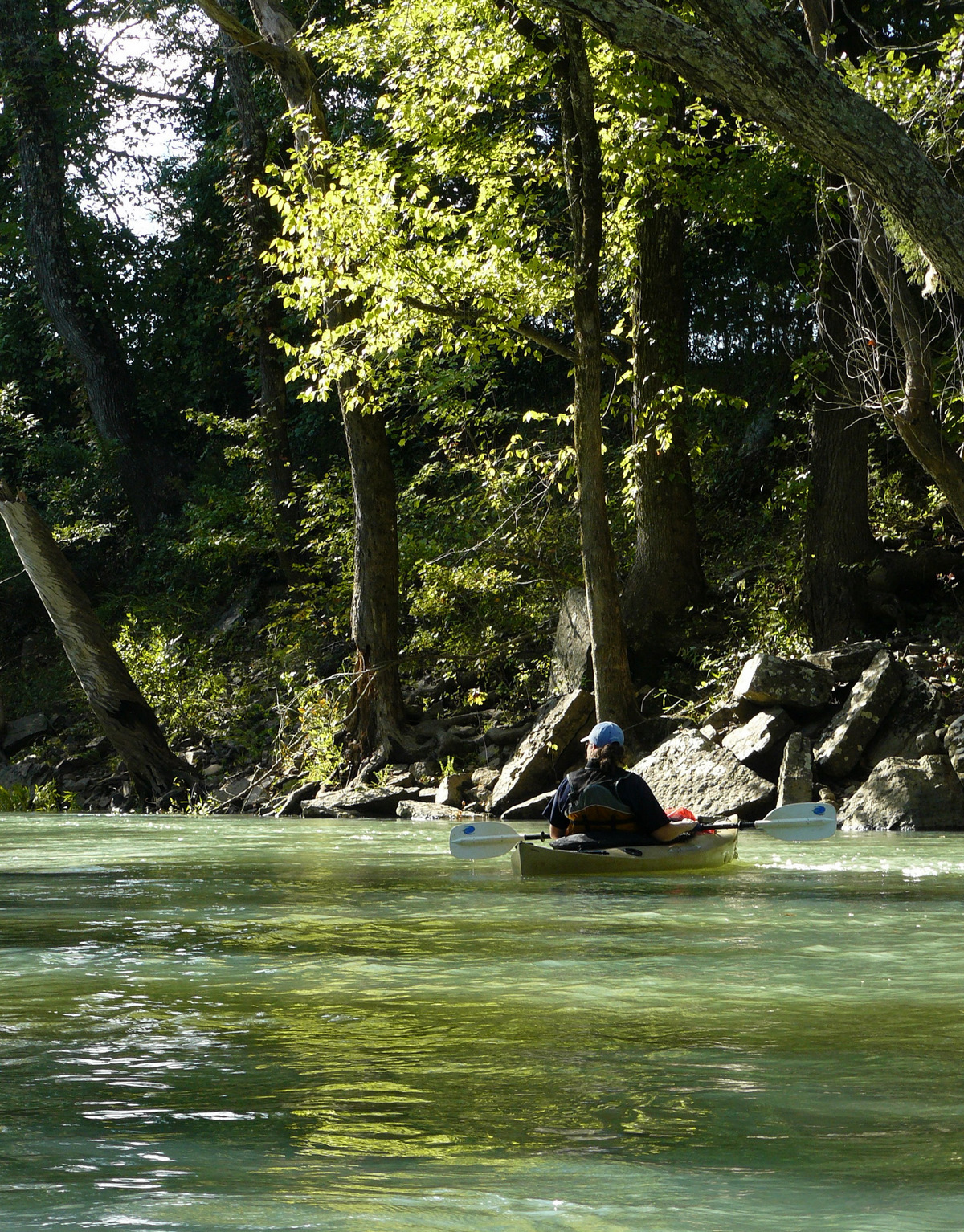
Canoeing on the Mulberry near Ozark

The Mulberry is a scenic and popular river for recreational boating with kayaks or canoes. The river varies greatly in its flow depending upon the season and recent precipitation, but the water level is usually adequate for paddling between mid-October and mid-June. Water quality is excellent. Forty-five miles of the river are floatable beginning at Wolf Pen Access and Recreation Area in the Ozark National Forest and continuing until near the river's mouth where it flows into the Arkansas River. There are Class I to III rapids at many points in the river and paddling can be hazardous if the water level is high. At low water the river is placid and barely flows. Several access points along the river offer camping and supplies. Fishing for Smallmouth Bass and Green Sunfish is also popular.

The uppermost 56 miles of the Mulberry River were designated for protection as part of the National Wild and Scenic Rivers System by the United States government in 1992.

== See also ==
- Mulberry River Bridge (Pleasant Hill, Arkansas)
- Mulberry River Bridge (Turner's Bend, Arkansas)
- List of Arkansas rivers

== Sources ==
- Columbia Gazetteer of North America entry
- DeLorme (2004). Arkansas Atlas & Gazetteer. Yarmouth, Maine: DeLorme. ISBN 0-89933-345-1.
