= Vesta, Arkansas =

Coordinates: 35.37926°N 94.04187°W

Vesta is an unincorporated community in Franklin County, in the U.S. state of Arkansas.

== History ==
A post office called Vesta was established at Vesta in 1884, and remained in operation until 1918. A Baptist church was erected at the site in 1888.
