= Mulberry High School (Arkansas) =

Location
- 203 West 5th Street; Mulberry, Arkansas 72947; United States
- Coordinates: 35°30′2″N 94°3′20″W

Information
- Type: Public
- Motto: Pursuing education excellence
- School district: Mulberry–Pleasant View Bi-County School District
- CEEB code: 041785
- NCES School ID: 051029000753
- Teaching staff: 21.56 (on FTE basis)
- Grades: 9th through 12th
- Enrollment: 117 (2023-2024)
- Student to teacher ratio: 5.43
- Color(s): Black and gold
- Mascot: Yellowjacket
- Website: www.mpvschools.com/page/mulberry-high-school

Mulberry High School is a four-year public high school located in Mulberry, Arkansas. It is the sole high school administered by the Mulberry–Pleasant View Bi-County School District and supports the Crawford County community of Mulberry, the Franklin County community of Ozark and surrounding unincorporated communities of each county.

== Academics ==
The assumed course of study follows the Smart Core curriculum developed by the Arkansas Department of Education. Students complete regular core and career focus courses and exams and may select Advanced Placement (AP) coursework and exams that may lead to college credit.

== Extracurricular activities ==
The Mulberry High School mascot is the yellowjacket with black and gold serving as the school colors.

For 2012–14, the Mulberry Yellowjackets participate in interscholastic sporting activities within the 1A Classification—the state's smallest classification—from the 1A West Conference as administered by the Arkansas Activities Association. The Yellowjackets compete in volleyball, golf (boys/girls), basketball (boys/girls), tennis (boys/girls), baseball, softball, swimming and diving (boys/girls), track and field (boys/girls), and cheer.
