= Franklin County Jail (Ozark, Arkansas) =

- U.S. National Register of Historic Places
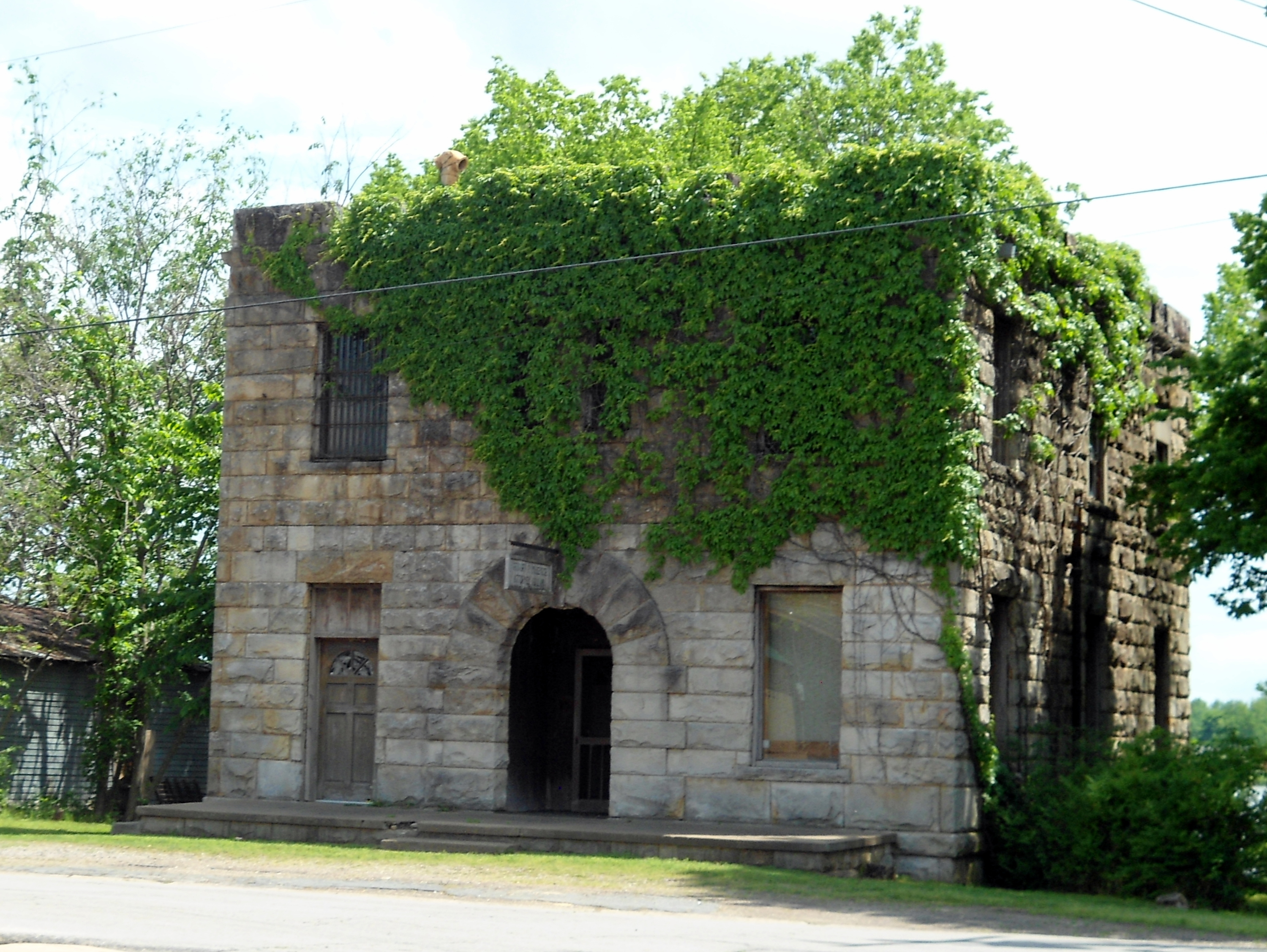

- Location within Arkansas Location within the United States
- Location: 3rd and River Sts., Ozark, Arkansas
- Coordinates: 35°29′6″N 93°49′37″W
- Area: less than one acre
- Built: 1914
- Built by: Claude Talley
- NRHP reference No.: 82002114
- Added to NRHP: June 23, 1982

The former Franklin County Jail is a historic building at 3rd and River Streets in Ozark, Arkansas. It is a two-story masonry structure, built out of native sandstone. It is roughly cubic in shape, with a flat roof obscured by a crenellated parapet, and its entrance set in a Romanesque arch. It was built in 1914, and has been rehabilitated to house professional offices.

The building was listed on the National Register of Historic Places in 1982.

== See also ==
- National Register of Historic Places listings in Franklin County, Arkansas
