= Ozark High School (Arkansas) =

Location
- 1631 Hillbilly Drive; Ozark, Arkansas 72949; United States; 35°29′38″N 93°50′49″W

Information
- School type: Public comprehensive
- Status: Open
- School district: Ozark School District
- CEEB code: 041930
- NCES School ID: 051101000830
- Teaching staff: 62.13 (on FTE basis)
- Grades: 8–12
- Enrollment: 675 (2023-2024)
- Student to teacher ratio: 10.86
- Education system: ADE Smart Core
- Classes offered: Regular, Advanced Placement (AP)
- Colors: Purple and gold
- Athletics conference: 4A Region 4
- Mascot: The Hillbilly Old mascot known as the Ozark Bulldog in 1924.
- Team name: Ozark Hillbillies
- Accreditation: ADE
- Feeder to: Ozark Junior High School
- Affiliation: Arkansas Activities Association
- Website: www.ozarkhillbillies.org/o/ohs

Ozark High School is a comprehensive public high school for students in grades 10 through 12 located in Ozark, Arkansas, United States. Ozark High School is the only high school of the Ozark School District in western Arkansas serving most of northern Franklin County and a small portion of western Johnson County. The district, most notably the high school, is most famous for its mascot, the Hillbilly. Patrons claim that Ozark is the only district in the Union with the Hillbilly as its mascot, though both the nickname and comparable likenesses are used by other schools. However, Ozark is the only district to use the nickname and likeness together.

The high school benefits from the district's membership in the Western Arkansas Educational Service Cooperative (WAESC), which was formed to assist school districts to work collectively and maximize educational funding by providing shared services to schools and students in western Arkansas.

== Academics ==
The assumed course of study follows the Smart Core curriculum developed by the Arkansas Department of Education (ADE), which requires students complete at least 22 units prior to graduation. Students complete regular coursework and exams and may take Advanced Placement (AP) courses and exam with the opportunity to receive college credit.

== Extracurricular activities ==
=== Mascot and colors ===
The high school emblem (mascot) and colors have been shared by all schools in the district. The Hillbilly, which is almost always depicted in purple overalls and armed with a shotgun, was adopted as the school emblem in 1935. Purple and gold were adopted as the school colors the same year, replacing the red and white that had been used. The mascot and colors were similar to that of what was then the College of the Ozarks, whose mascot was the Mountaineer until the 1980s.

The original mascot was the Bulldogs until the 1930s when the school board voted to change it to the Hillbilly. In 2008, the high school baseball team tried to revive the original logo and colors, displaying the original "OHS" logo on their baseball hats which symbolizes a large "O" representing a baseball with an "H" in the middle symbolizing the seams on the baseball and then the letter "S".

=== Athletics ===
The Ozark Hillbillies compete in interscholastic activities within the 4A Classification administered by the Arkansas Activities Association. The Hillbillies play within the 4A Region 1 Conference. Ozark fields varsity teams in football, golf (boys/girls), basketball (boys/girls), cross country (boys/girls), cheer, bowling (boys/girls), baseball, fastpitch softball, track and field (boys/girls).

==== State championships ====
The Hillbillies boys cross country team won four state championships between 1970 and 1980. Ozark girls took home the state title in cross country in 2014. The girls golf team won consecutive state championships in 2002 and 2003 and the boys golf team won a state title in 2008. The Ozark girls basketball team, led by Sarah Pfeifer recognized as female high school athlete of the year by the Arkansas Democrat-Gazette, won consecutive state titles in 2000 and 2001 and were state runner-up in 2002. In 2001, Sarah Pfeifer tossed the shot put 40'-10", which remains an Arkansas state record.
