= Mulberry, Arkansas =

- City
- Location of Mulberry in Crawford County, Arkansas.
- Coordinates: 35°30′31″N 94°04′29″W
- Country: United States
- State: Arkansas
- County: Crawford

Government
  - Type: Mayor–council government
  - Body: City council
  - Mayor: Gary D. Baxter

Area
  - Total: 8.06 sq mi (20.87 km^{2})
  - Land: 7.83 sq mi (20.27 km^{2})
  - Water: 0.23 sq mi (0.60 km^{2})
- Elevation: 400 ft (120 m)

Population (2020)
  - Total: 1,543
  - Estimate (2025): 1,635 ▲
  - Density: 197.2/sq mi (76.13/km^{2})
- Time zone: UTC-6 (Central Time Zone (CST))
  - Summer (DST): UTC-5 (CDT)
- ZIP code: 72947
- Area code: 479
- FIPS code: 05-48200
- GNIS ID: 2404335
- Website: mulberryar.gov

Mulberry is a city in Crawford County, Arkansas, United States. It is part of the Fort Smith, Arkansas-Oklahoma Metropolitan Statistical Area. As of the 2020 census, Mulberry had a population of 1,543.

== Geography ==
According to the 2010 Census, Mulberry is located at 35°30′31″N 94°04′29″W (35.508517, -94.074754). It has a total area of 7.834 square miles (20.29 square kilometers), of which 7.637 sq mi (19.78 km^{2}) is land and 0.197 sq mi (0.51 km^{2}) is water (2.51%).

The trail into Devil’s Canyon Scenic Area, inside the Ozark–St. Francis National Forest, is about 10 miles north of Mulberry on State Highway 215.

== Demographics ==
Historical population
Census	Pop.	Note	%±
1890	321		—
1900	361		12.5%
1910	722		100.0%
1920	1,095		51.7%
1930	895		−18.3%
1940	973		8.7%
1950	952		−2.2%
1960	934		−1.9%
1970	1,340		43.5%
1980	1,444		7.8%
1990	1,448		0.3%
2000	1,627		12.4%
2010	1,655		1.7%
2020	1,543		−6.8%
2025 (est.)	1,635	▲	6.0%
U.S. Decennial Census

=== 2020 census ===
Mulberry racial composition
Race	Number	Percentage
White (non-Hispanic)	1,371	88.85%
Black or African American (non-Hispanic)	11	0.71%
Native American	27	1.75%
Asian	4	0.26%
Pacific Islander	1	0.06%
Other/Mixed	99	6.42%
Hispanic or Latino	30	1.94%

As of the 2020 census, Mulberry had a population of 1,543. The median age was 42.7 years. 24.4% of residents were under the age of 18 and 20.2% of residents were 65 years of age or older. For every 100 females there were 102.0 males, and for every 100 females age 18 and over there were 97.0 males age 18 and over.

0.0% of residents lived in urban areas, while 100.0% lived in rural areas.

There were 615 households in Mulberry, of which 32.2% had children under the age of 18 living in them. Of all households, 45.2% were married-couple households, 19.3% were households with a male householder and no spouse or partner present, and 28.3% were households with a female householder and no spouse or partner present. About 29.3% of all households were made up of individuals and 16.9% had someone living alone who was 65 years of age or older. There were 446 families residing in the city.

There were 753 housing units, of which 18.3% were vacant. The homeowner vacancy rate was 0.2% and the rental vacancy rate was 22.3%.

=== 2000 census ===
As of the 2000 United States census, there were 1,627 people, 669 households, and 472 families residing in the city. The population density was 215.5 inhabitants per square mile (83.2/km^{2}). There were 743 housing units at an average density of 98.4 per square mile (38.0/km^{2}). The racial makeup of the city was 96.19% White, 0.06% Black or African American, 2.64% Native American, 0.25% Asian, and 0.86% from two or more races. 0.92% of the population were Hispanic or Latino of any race.

There were 669 households, out of which 28.1% had children under the age of 18 living with them, 56.4% were married couples living together, 9.9% had a female householder with no husband present, and 29.4% were non-families. 26.3% of all households were made up of individuals, and 15.8% had someone living alone who was 65 years of age or older. The average household size was 2.37 and the average family size was 2.83.

In the city, the population was spread out, with 23.3% under the age of 18, 8.2% from 18 to 24, 26.9% from 25 to 44, 24.3% from 45 to 64, and 17.3% who were 65 years of age or older. The median age was 39 years. For every 100 females, there were 96.7 males. For every 100 females age 18 and over, there were 89.4 males.

The median income for a household in the city was $27,197, and the median income for a family was $32,321. Males had a median income of $28,281 versus $17,734 for females. The per capita income for the city was $14,204. About 14.9% of families and 19.9% of the population were below the poverty line, including 23.7% of those under age 18 and 19.9% of those age 65 or over.

== Education ==
Public education for elementary and secondary students is provided by the Mulberry–Pleasant View Bi-County School District, which leads to graduation from Mulberry High School.

== See also ==
- List of cities in Arkansas
- Pleasant Hill, Crawford County, Arkansas, a neighborhood of Mulberry
