= Kingston School District =

Defunct school district in, United States

Kingston School District was a school district headquartered in Kingston, a community in unincorporated Madison County, Arkansas.

Its school was Kingston Public School/Kingston School, divided into Kingston Elementary School and Kingston High School.
