= Tornado outbreak of May 2–4, 2021 =

Severe weather outbreak in the United States

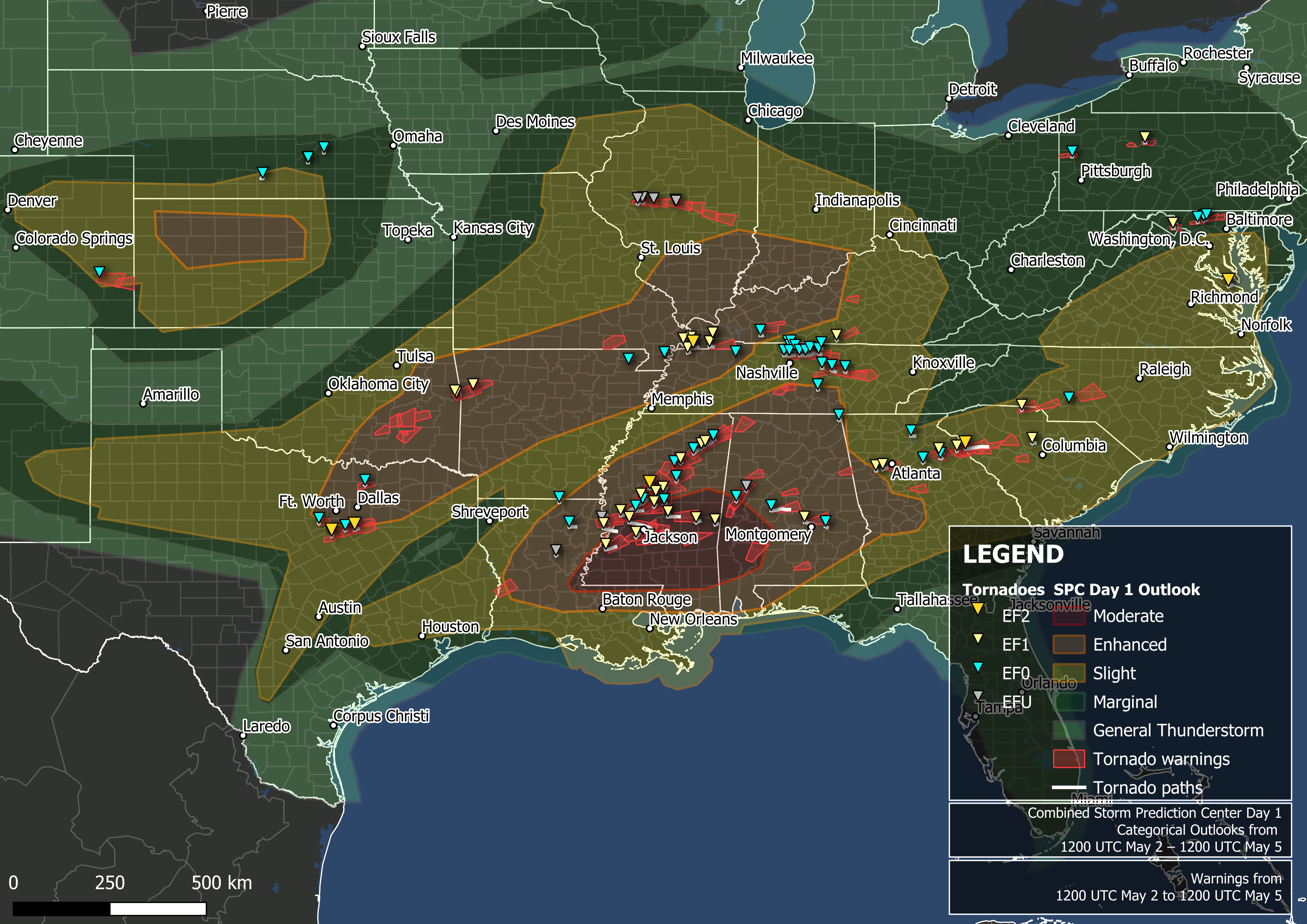
- Map of tornado warnings and confirmed tornadoes during the outbreak (from May 2–4)

Meteorological history
- Duration: May 2–4, 2021

Tornado outbreak
- Tornadoes: 97
- Max. rating: EF2 tornado
- Duration: 2.5 days
- Highest winds: Tornadic – 130 mph (210 km/h) (Blum, Texas EF2 on May 3); Straight-line – 100 mph (160 km/h) (Walnut Ridge, Arkansas on May 3)
- Largest hail: 5.50 in (14.0 cm) in diameter in China Grove, Texas, on May 3

Overall effects
- Fatalities: 4 non-tornadic
- Injuries: 10
- Damage: $1.3 billion (2021 USD)
- Areas affected: Southeastern United States, Central Plains, Mississippi Valley, and Mid-Atlantic
- Part of the tornado outbreaks of 2021

A large tornado outbreak of mostly weak tornadoes impacted the Southeastern United States and Central Plains in early May 2021. It began on May 2, predominantly in Mississippi, where around a dozen mostly weak tornadoes occurred. Several towns and cities sustained considerable damage, especially Tupelo, Mississippi, where a tornado emergency was issued for a nocturnal EF1 wedge tornado. Earlier, a large tornado, rated high-end EF1, ripped through areas southeast of Yazoo City, following a similar path to the deadly EF4 tornado from April 24, 2010. In Nebraska, multiple landspout tornadoes were reported, including an EF0 tornado that damaged a storage facility in Aurora. Two EF1 tornadoes caused damage in suburban areas west of Atlanta, while two non-tornadic fatalities occurred in the area due to falling trees. A large, radar-confirmed EF2 tornado prompted multiple PDS tornado warnings near Abbeville and Greenwood, South Carolina, damaging multiple homes and downing numerous trees. An EF1 tornado damaged multiple buildings in Ranson, West Virginia, injuring one person.

Southwest of Dallas, there were multiple tornado warnings and several tornadoes touched down, including one that inflicted major damage to a house near Blum, Texas, and was rated high-end EF2. Eight more injuries occurred near Waxahachie, Texas when another EF2 tornado flipped vehicles on I-35E and caused significant to structures in the area. Severe weather activity continued into May 4, with numerous additional weak tornado touching down. Areas near San Antonio were pounded by large hail, including a hailstone that measured 5.50 inches (14.0 cm) in diameter in China Grove, Texas. This occurred just a week after another hailstorm affected the same area. The storms later organized into a massive squall line, producing widespread wind damage and several weak tornadoes. Overall, 97 tornadoes were confirmed. There were also four non-tornadic fatalities – two in Georgia, one in Tennessee and one in Virginia.

== Meteorological synopsis ==
=== May 2 ===
Three separate zones of severe weather were forecasted by the Storm Prediction Center for May 2. The first one was located in the Central High Plains, including Colorado and Kansas, where an enhanced risk was issued for potential of significant damaging winds, large hail, and a tornado or two. The second one was in the Lower Mississippi Valley and Central Gulf Coast, where a slight risk for damaging winds, large hail, and tornadoes was issued. A small marginal risk area for isolated large hail and damaging winds was also issued in parts of Iowa, Minnesota, and Wisconsin. Multiple rounds of severe weather moved through these areas. In the Plains, multiple multi-cell storms formed in the Front Range and moved eastward, producing damaging winds of up to 93 miles per hour (150 km/h) and hail up to 1.75 inches (4.4 cm) in diameter. Several tornado warnings were issued and an EF0 tornado briefly touched down north of McClave, Colorado. This activity pushed into Kansas and Southern Nebraska, with the latter seeing several landspout tornadoes cause damage to several buildings. Farther to the southeast, several tornadic supercells formed in Louisiana, Mississippi, Alabama, with the brunt of the outbreak taking place in Mississippi, where 15 tornadoes touched down. A long-tracked high-end EF1 tornado caused extensive tree damage and destroyed mobile homes at the south edge of Yazoo City. A low-end EF2 tornado downed numerous trees, high-tension power lines, and damaged a home at the Holmes–Carroll County line. A tornado emergency was issued for Tupelo later that night when a cyclic supercell produced two EF1 tornadoes as it approached the area, the second of which caused considerable damage to homes and trees in the town. Another EF1 tornado caused damage in Calhoun City, where an old masonry building was completely destroyed.

=== May 3–4 ===
On May 3, the SPC issued an enhanced risk from Central Texas to Western Kentucky for a 30% hatched risk area for wind damage, although a 10% hatched risk for tornadoes and a 30% hatched area for large hail was included for North Texas that afternoon. Severe weather began early in the day farther east, as two EF1 tornadoes caused damage in the Atlanta, Georgia suburbs, and an EF2 tornado downed many trees and damaged homes near Abbeville and Greenwood, South Carolina. Another EF2 tornado obliterated a manufactured home and caused major tree damage near Callao, Virginia. In Texas, a highly sheared and unstable environment resulted in scattered supercells and tornadoes that evening, a few of which were strong. A high-end EF2 tornado ripped the roof and some exterior walls from a house near Blum, while another EF2 tornado flipped vehicles and caused severe structural damage near Waxahachie, injuring eight people. An EF1 tornado also caused considerable damage in Fort Smith, Arkansas as well. On May 4, the SPC issued an enhanced risk for the Southeast, then upgraded it to a moderate risk for a hatched 45% risk for wind damage with a 5% risk for tornadoes. Numerous weak tornadoes touched down, especially in Tennessee, where the towns of White House, Gallatin, Lafayette, and Sparta all sustained minor damage from EF0 tornadoes. An isolated strong tornado occurred in Kentucky, where an EF2 tornado near Fulton tore much of the roof off a house, tossed a car, and snapped large trees.

== Confirmed tornadoes ==
Confirmed tornadoes by Enhanced Fujita rating
EFU	EF0	EF1	EF2	EF3	EF4	EF5	Total
10	47	34	6	0	0	0	97

=== May 2 event ===
List of confirmed tornadoes – Sunday, May 2, 2021 (Note: All dates are based on the local time zone where the tornado touched down; however, all times are in Coordinated Universal Time for consistency.)
EF#	Location	County / Parish	State	Start Coord.	Time (UTC)	Path length	Max width
EF0	NW of Clinton	Greene	AL	32.955°N 88.0286°W	20:45–20:50	1.42 mi (2.29 km)	45 yd (41 m)
EF0	A brief tornado caused sporadic damage, uprooting a few softwood trees and breaking large tree limbs.						
EFU	S of Talla Bena	Madison	LA	32.4726°N 91.1626°W	21:57–21:59	1.38 mi (2.22 km)	25 yd (23 m)
EFU	A brief tornado crossed US 65. No damage was observed.						
EF0	N of McClave	Bent	CO	38.16°N 102.85°W	22:20–20:23	0.92 mi (1.48 km)	20 yd (18 m)
EF0	A tornado was observed. No other details are available.						
EFU	S of Elrod	Tuscaloosa	AL	33.1927°N 87.7959°W	22:25–22:26	0.25 mi (0.40 km)	25 yd (23 m)
EFU	A brief, weak tornado was caught on video, no damage could be found.						
EFU	W of Jena	LaSalle	LA	31.6904°N 92.2236°W	22:46–22:47	1.18 mi (1.90 km)	25 yd (23 m)
EFU	A brief tornado was caught on drone video as it lifted moisture from the ground. No damage was reported.						
EF1	E of Valley Park to E of Yazoo City	Issaquena, Yazoo	MS	32.6258°N 90.7173°W	22:46–23:35	30.15 mi (48.52 km)	300 yd (270 m)
EF1	A high-end EF1 tornado destroyed two mobile homes and a billboard at the south edge of Yazoo City, with debris scattered. Two other mobile homes and other buildings were also damaged, some by fallen trees. Extensive tree damage occurred along the path, and outbuildings were destroyed.						
EF1	WNW of Coxburg to NE of Howard	Holmes	MS	33.0062°N 90.2497°W	22:53–23:11	10.63 mi (17.11 km)	450 yd (410 m)
EF1	A high-end EF1 tornado removed part of the roof of a mobile home and caused heavy tree damage.						
EF1	NW of Lorman to NE of Pattison	Jefferson, Claiborne	MS	31.8345°N 91.0644°W	22:55–23:18	14.03 mi (22.58 km)	650 yd (590 m)
EF1	Trees were uprooted and snapped and tree limbs were broken.						
EF2	SW of Acona to ESE of Black Hawk	Holmes, Carroll	MS	33.2512°N 90.0426°W	23:31–23:40	5.95 mi (9.58 km)	510 yd (470 m)
EF2	Numerous large trees were snapped or uprooted along the path. One house had moderate roof damage and was struck by a falling tree, as well as some high-tension power lines that were brought down by trees.						
EF0	NNW of Midway to NNW of Ebenezer	Yazoo, Holmes	MS	32.8981°N 90.2052°W	23:44–23:59	8.15 mi (13.12 km)	100 yd (91 m)
EF0	Damage was mainly limited to trees.						
EF0	ENE of Marion	Union	LA	32.9291°N 92.1492°W	23:52–23:53	0.11 mi (0.18 km)	80 yd (73 m)
EF0	A brief tornado uprooted approximately 40 trees in a convergent pattern east of Marion.						
EF1	W of Durant	Holmes	MS	33.0708°N 89.9014°W	00:20–00:27	4.15 mi (6.68 km)	300 yd (270 m)
EF1	An old building had roof damage and a utility pole was knocked down. Many trees were snapped, uprooted, or had broken limbs. Two trees fell on a home and a parked school bus.						
EF1	SSE of Pine Grove to Byram	Hinds	MS	32.1172°N 90.3617°W	00:22–00:35	6.88 mi (11.07 km)	1,000 yd (910 m)
EF1	Several homes sustained roof damage, some from fallen trees, and a barn was damaged. Some basketball hoops were toppled Many large trees were snapped and uprooted, and some basketball goals were blown down.						
EF1	SE of Pickens	Madison	MS	32.8268°N 89.9414°W	00:41–00:47	3.37 mi (5.42 km)	250 yd (230 m)
EF1	Tree limbs and treetops were broken. A few trees were uprooted and snapped.						
EF1	NE of Possumneck to N of Hesterville	Attala	MS	33.1676°N 89.7316°W	00:42–00:51	7.46 mi (12.01 km)	110 yd (100 m)
EF1	One home sustained roof damage. Multiple trees were uprooted or snapped and a power line was downed.						
EF0	Southern Aurora	Hamilton	NE	40.8401°N 97.9914°W	00:51–00:56	0.92 mi (1.48 km)	150 yd (140 m)
EF0	A landspout blew in the garage doors of a storage unit at the south edge of Aurora, downed a power line, and lofted corn.						
EFU	S of Aurora	Hamilton	NE	40.8403°N 98.0049°W	00:51–00:52	0.01 mi (0.016 km)	40 yd (37 m)
EFU	A landspout tornado was confirmed from photographs. No damage was reported.						
EF0	ESE of Axtell	Kearney	NE	40.474°N 99.0502°W	00:57–01:01	1.72 mi (2.77 km)	150 yd (140 m)
EF0	A landspout tornado was caught on video. Damage was minimal.						
EF0	SW of Stromsburg	Polk	NE	41.0707°N 97.6259°W	01:06–01:10	1.33 mi (2.14 km)	100 yd (91 m)
EF0	A landspout caused minor damage to a home, blew out the doors of a metal building, overturned a horse trailer, and caused minor tree damage.						
EF0	Sabougla	Calhoun	MS	33.762°N 89.471°W	01:08–01:11	1.29 mi (2.08 km)	50 yd (46 m)
EF0	Trees were knocked down.						
EF0	SE of Sallis	Leake	MS	32.8777°N 89.7076°W	01:17–01:23	2.94 mi (4.73 km)	50 yd (46 m)
EF0	Trees were snapped and uprooted along the path.						
EF0	N of French Camp	Choctaw	MS	33.4181°N 89.424°W	01:23–01:27	2.07 mi (3.33 km)	60 yd (55 m)
EF0	A brief tornado blew down trees.						
EF1	Calhoun City	Calhoun	MS	33.8350°N 89.3249°W	01:30–01:33	2.07 mi (3.33 km)	50 yd (46 m)
EF1	An old masonry structure was completely destroyed. Homes, apartments, and other buildings throughout town sustained considerable damage from wind and falling trees.						
EF0	N of New Houlka to NW of Troy	Chickasaw, Pontotoc	MS	34.065°N 89.024°W	02:15–02:29	7.45 mi (11.99 km)	50 yd (46 m)
EF0	Numerous trees were damaged.						
EF1	E of Algoma to SW of Tupelo	Pontotoc, Lee	MS	34.1795°N 88.8421°W	02:40–02:50	4.5 mi (7.2 km)	150 yd (140 m)
EF1	Numerous trees and the roofs of several residences were damaged.						
EF1	Tupelo to NNW of Eggville	Lee	MS	34.2333°N 88.7520°W	02:53–03:19	12.66 mi (20.37 km)	400 yd (370 m)
EF1	Two residences in Tupelo lost parts of their roofs and several houses suffered substantial damage from fallen trees. Commercial buildings were damaged and a church suffered minor roof damage. Numerous trees were uprooted and some were snapped. This tornado, as well as the preceding one, prompted a tornado emergency for Tupelo.						
EF0	E of Saltillo to NNW of Mantachie	Lee, Itawamba	MS	34.3670°N 88.5602°W	03:22–03:27	1.99 mi (3.20 km)	100 yd (91 m)
EF0	Trees were damaged by this weak tornado.						

=== May 3 event ===
List of confirmed tornadoes – Monday, May 3, 2021
EF#	Location	County / Parish	State	Start Coord.	Time (UTC)	Path length	Max width
EF1	Tompkinsville	Monroe	KY	36.7022°N 85.6957°W	13:08–13:09	0.5 mi (0.80 km)	60 yd (55 m)
EF1	Trees were snapped and uprooted, power lines were downed, buildings in Tompkinsville sustained roof and window damage, and an RV was flipped.						
EF1	E of Bill Arp to NNE of Fouts Mill	Douglas	GA	33.6681°N 84.7821°W	14:00–14:03	1.45 mi (2.33 km)	250 yd (230 m)
EF1	Trees were snapped and uprooted, falling on at least 10 homes.						
EF1	NE of Campbellton to WSW of Adamsville	Fulton	GA	33.6974°N 84.6206°W	14:22–14:34	5.73 mi (9.22 km)	400 yd (370 m)
EF1	This high-end EF1 tornado first significantly damaged multiple warehouses, before moving into a residential area, where numerous trees were snapped and uprooted. Houses in this area sustained roof and siding damage as well.						
EF1	NNE of Smyrna	York	SC	35.077°N 81.386°W	16:39–16:40	0.5 mi (0.80 km)	150 yd (140 m)
EF1	The tornado touched down in a field before moving through a farm, destroying one building, damaging several others and killing 4,000 turkeys. Trees were damaged farther along the path.						
EF0	S of Gratis	Walton	GA	33.8501°N 83.6841°W	16:39–16:42	1.4 mi (2.3 km)	200 yd (180 m)
EF0	A brief tornado snapped trees and caused minor damage to a fence and a home.						
EF0	NNW of Manchester	Coffee	TN	35.5524°N 86.1322°W	16:42–16:44	0.83 mi (1.34 km)	50 yd (46 m)
EF0	Two homes sustained minor damage, and numerous trees were blown down. The path was visible in a corn field.						
EF1	SSE of Neese to S of Danielsville	Madison	GA	34.0672°N 83.315°W	16:54–17:05	5.53 mi (8.90 km)	250 yd (230 m)
EF1	Numerous trees were snapped or uprooted along the path, some of them falling on and damaging houses. Outbuildings were destroyed as well.						
EF0	S of Winterville to ESE of Dunlap	Oglethorpe	GA	33.9543°N 83.2791°W	17:29–17:32	1.87 mi (3.01 km)	200 yd (180 m)
EF0	Trees were uprooted and snapped and a barn lost its roof.						
EF1	NW of Elberton	Elbert	GA	34.128°N 82.895°W	17:41–17:42	0.13 mi (0.21 km)	25 yd (23 m)
EF1	A very brief tornado collapsed the roof supports of a warehouse. Trees were snapped or uprooted.						
EF2	SW of Lowndesville to NW Greenwood	Abbeville, Greenwood	SC	34.174°N 82.696°W	18:04-18:54	29.35 mi (47.23 km)	150 yd (140 m)
EF2	This tornado touched down southwest of Lowndesville and quickly intensified. In this area, a man was injured when he was blown off his porch and several outbuildings were destroyed. The tornado weakened as it passed south of Lowndesville, and sporadically uprooted trees for the next few miles. The tornado then quickly intensified again as it inflicted severe roof and exterior damage to a home. The tornado weakened as it moved east, snapping and uprooting numerous trees near Abbeville. It became strong again for a final time farther along the path as hundreds of hardwood trees were snapped in a localized area. The tornado weakened again, and lifted as it entered densely populated neighborhoods in Greenwood, where minor tree limb damage occurred. The tornado was on the ground for 51 minutes and prompted several PDS tornado warnings.						
EF0	S of St. Martin	Stanly	NC	35.2441°N 80.2856°W	18:23-18:25	1.48 mi (2.38 km)	150 yd (140 m)
EF0	A brief tornado destroyed a chicken house and snapped and uprooted several trees.						
EF2	NNW of Luttrellville to WNW of Lake	Northumberland	VA	37.956°N 76.575°W	19:01–19:03	4.41 mi (7.10 km)	250 yd (230 m)
EF2	A manufactured home built to withstand 100 mph (160 km/h) winds was swept away and completely destroyed. A nearby home lost its garage, with the home itself being severely damaged. Additional homes and outbuildings were damaged, and many trees were snapped or uprooted.						
EFU	ENE of Arenzville	Cass	IL	39.8849°N 90.3244°W	21:57–21:59	0.5 mi (0.80 km)	50 yd (46 m)
EFU	A weak tornado touched down in an open field, producing no damage.						
EFU	S of Virginia	Cass	IL	39.9074°N 90.2119°W	22:05–22:08	1.48 mi (2.38 km)	100 yd (91 m)
EFU	The tornado touched down in an open field, producing no damage.						
EFU	WNW of Pleasant Plains	Sangamon	IL	39.8799°N 89.9497°W	22:27–22:28	0.29 mi (0.47 km)	50 yd (46 m)
EFU	The tornado touched down in an open field, producing no damage.						
EF1	Ranson	Jefferson	WV	39.3108°N 77.8655°W	22:27–22:32	1.81 mi (2.91 km)	125 yd (114 m)
EF1	One outdoor shed was blown off its foundation, while another shed was shifted from its foundation. A tractor-trailer was blown over on SR 115. After crossing the highway, the tornado pushed over a large warehouse building that was partially open, injuring one person. Sections of the tin roof of the warehouse were carried as far as 1/2 mi (0.80 km) away. Another small warehouse building was also destroyed. Shingle and siding damage occurred to homes in Ranson, and trees were snapped or uprooted along the path. A mobile home was damaged before the tornado lifted.						
EF0	E of Granbury	Hood	TX	32.4403°N 97.7406°W	23:02–23:04	0.36 mi (0.58 km)	50 yd (46 m)
EF0	A carport and trees were damaged.						
EFU	ESE of Dawson	Sangamon	IL	39.8478°N 89.4508°W	23:10–23:11	0.43 mi (0.69 km)	50 yd (46 m)
EFU	The tornado touched down in an open field, producing no damage.						
EFU	WNW of Mechanicsburg	Sangamon	IL	39.8267°N 89.4282°W	23:14–23:15	0.63 mi (1.01 km)	50 yd (46 m)
EFU	The tornado touched down in an open field, producing no damage.						
EFU	W of Blum	Hill	TX	32.1367°N 97.4546°W	00:10	0.01 mi (0.016 km)	25 yd (23 m)
EFU	A brief tornado touched down before the larger EF2 tornado.						
EF0	SW of Libertytown	Frederick	MD	39.4520°N 77.2922°W	00:14–00:16	0.78 mi (1.26 km)	200 yd (180 m)
EF0	150 trees were uprooted, snapped or damaged.						
EF2	NW of Blum	Hill	TX	32.1426°N 97.4449°W	00:18–00:29	3.36 mi (5.41 km)	150 yd (140 m)
EF2	A brick house lost most of its roof and portions of its exterior walls as a result of this high-end EF2 tornado. Trees and outbuildings were also damaged.						
EF0	Unionville	Frederick	MD	39.482°N 77.153°W	00:35–00:36	0.64 mi (1.03 km)	150 yd (140 m)
EF0	Large sheds, equipment, and trees were damaged at a farm.						
EF0	S of Weston	Collin	TX	33.3276°N 96.6676°W	00:41–00:43	0.51 mi (0.82 km)	50 yd (46 m)
EF0	Power lines were downed by this weak, brief tornado.						
EF0	SE of New Windsor	Carroll	MD	39.511°N 77.084°W	00:47–00:48	0.21 mi (0.34 km)	75 yd (69 m)
EF0	A calf shed was unroofed and destroyed, killing the calf inside. Another shed was unroofed and destroyed. 10 trees were downed, one of which fell onto an old barn.						
EF0	ENE of Grandview	Johnson	TX	32.2771°N 97.1279°W	01:00-01:01	0.24 mi (0.39 km)	50 yd (46 m)
EF0	Power lines, a utility pole, and trees were damaged.						
EF0	NW of Portersville	Lawrence	PA	40.976°N 80.210°W	01:37	0.16 mi (0.26 km)	50 yd (46 m)
EF0	A very brief, weak tornado caused damage to tree limbs.						
EF2	Five Points to S of Waxahachie	Ellis	TX	32.28°N 96.91°W	01:43–01:57	5.43 mi (8.74 km)	659 yd (603 m)
EF2	In the Five Points area, this tornado caused major roof damage to a home, lesser damage to several other homes, destroyed outbuildings, overturned a mobile home, and snapped many trees. Three semi-trucks and a cargo van were blown over on I-35E south of Nena, injuring three people. After crossing the interstate, the tornado ripped the roof off of a two-story home, overturned a pickup truck, damaged or destroyed some mobile homes, collapsed metal electrical transmission truss towers and a microwave tower, damaged two metal buildings, and injured five additional people in this area. The tornado dissipated shortly after. Overall, the tornado injured eight people.						
EF1	NW of Paw Paw, OK to ENE of Graphic, AR	Sequoyah (OK), Sebastian (AR), Crawford (AR)	OK, AR	35.363°N 94.547°W	02:33–03:05	28.8 mi (46.3 km)	2,200 yd (2,000 m)
EF1	In Oklahoma, trees were uprooted southeast of Muldrow where this large very tornado first developed. As the tornado moved northeast, it flipped multiple center-pivot irritation systems and snapped power poles near Moffett. The tornado then crossed the Arkansas River into Arkansas and moved into the northern side of Fort Smith in Sebastian County, where it damaged many homes and businesses. The tornado crossed the Arkansas River once again into Crawford County and into Van Buren where the Crawford County courthouse had most of its roof removed. Many homes and businesses were also damaged in Van Buren. The tornado continued to the northeast of Van Buren, hitting portions of Rudy and Alma. Outbuildings were destroyed, more homes and businesses were damaged, power poles were snapped, and trees were snapped or uprooted. The tornado crossed I-49 before lifting southeast of Mountainburg. Damaging straight-line winds in excess of 80–100 mph (130–160 km/h) surrounded this tornado as it tracked across Sebastian and Crawford counties. Some areas damaged by the tornado sustained additional damage from straight-line winds that followed behind the tornado.						
EF1	E of Muldrow, OK to NE of Dora, AR	Sequoyah (OK), Crawford (AR)	OK, AR	35.409°N 94.578°W	02:36–02:47	10.3 mi (16.6 km)	900 yd (820 m)
EF1	This large tornado tracked just north of the previous one. In Oklahoma, trees were snapped and uprooted east of Muldrow where this tornado first touched down. The tornado moved east-northeast to the north of Roland where it snapped trees and power poles, destroyed outbuildings, and damaged several homes. Shortly after, the tornado moved into Arkansas north of I-40 and dissipated to the northeast of Dora, after snapping and uprooting more trees. Widespread tree damage continued beyond the path of this tornado, caused by straight-line wind.						
EF1	N of Dyer	Crawford	AR	35.555°N 94.153°W	03:06–03:10	2.7 mi (4.3 km)	300 yd (270 m)
EF1	This tornado developed just after the first large EF1 Fort Smith area tornado dissipated to the northeast. Power poles were blown down, and trees were uprooted along the path.						

=== May 4 event ===
List of confirmed tornadoes – Tuesday, May 4, 2021
EF#	Location	County / Parish	State	Start Coord.	Time (UTC)	Path length	Max width
EF0	Oak Grove Heights	Greene	AR	36.1466°N 90.5353°W	07:09–07:12	2.24 mi (3.60 km)	100 yd (91 m)
EF0	A shed and storage building were damaged and a mobile home was pushed off it piers. Numerous trees were uprooted and a few were snapped.						
EF0	N of Concord	Pemiscot	MO	36.3001°N 89.7007°W	07:55–07:58	2.73 mi (4.39 km)	90 yd (82 m)
EF0	Residences, two grain bins, and a shop were damaged, with debris carried about 0.25 mi (0.40 km). Trees were uprooted wit one falling on a church.						
EF1	N of Dorena	Mississippi	MO	36.623°N 89.262°W	08:19–08:25	3.71 mi (5.97 km)	400 yd (370 m)
EF1	An equipment shed was destroyed, a pivot sprinkler system was damaged, and trees were uprooted and snapped.						
EF1	WSW of Union City	Obion	TN	36.4123°N 89.1602°W	08:23–08:26	2.6 mi (4.2 km)	50 yd (46 m)
EF1	A 500-foot (150 m) tower and antennae were damaged numerous trees were downed, with some falling on houses.						
EF1	W of Clinton	Hickman	KY	36.661°N 89.089°W	08:31–08:38	5.25 mi (8.45 km)	100 yd (91 m)
EF1	Trees were snapped or uprooted. Tree branches and trees fell onto homes, causing damage. There was damage to 28 residential structures and 12 commercial structures.						
EF2	WNW of Fulton	Fulton	KY	36.52°N 89.031°W	08:33–08:41	6.06 mi (9.75 km)	150 yd (140 m)
EF2	Several large trees were snapped and uprooted by this tornado. A house had most of its roof removed and sustained significant damage to its exterior. Three outbuildings were destroyed in this area, and a car was moved 20 feet (6.1 m).						
EF1	SW of Cuba to Lynnville	Graves	KY	36.5544°N 88.6519°W	08:55–09:00	4.67 mi (7.52 km)	125 yd (114 m)
EF1	Several farm buildings lost their roofs, two homes had minor roof and siding damage, and smaller structures were destroyed. Many trees were snapped or uprooted.						
EF1	ENE of Mayfield	Graves	KY	36.758°N 88.578°W	08:59–09:00	0.54 mi (0.87 km)	100 yd (91 m)
EF1	A well-constructed home sustained roof damage. Large trees were uprooted along a creek bed.						
EF0	WSW of Lick Creek	Benton	TN	36.317°N 88.042°W	09:35–09:39	3.14 mi (5.05 km)	80 yd (73 m)
EF0	A few outbuildings were damaged and trees were uprooted. Some trees fell on and damaged homes and vehicles.						
EF0	SE of Hopkinsville	Christian	KY	36.819°N 87.468°W	10:12–10:15	2.62 mi (4.22 km)	75 yd (69 m)
EF0	Four barns lost portions of their tin roofs and siding. Trees were uprooted or damaged.						
EF0	N of Joelton	Cheatham, Davidson	TN	36.3537°N 86.92°W	10:54–11:00	4.91 mi (7.90 km)	100 yd (91 m)
EF0	Trees were uprooted, and large branches were snapped off.						
EF0	WNW of Cross Plains	Robertson	TN	36.5621°N 86.8271°W	10:56–10:58	1.76 mi (2.83 km)	25 yd (23 m)
EF0	A small tornado heavily damaged an outbuilding, blew much of the roof off a large barn, destroyed a carport, and blew down trees.						
EF0	NE of Greenbrier	Robertson	TN	36.4675°N 86.7798°W	11:01–11:04	2.21 mi (3.56 km)	200 yd (180 m)
EF0	A house lost shingles and a board pieced its roof. A shed lost was destroyed a carport was torn from an RV. Trees were blown down.						
EF0	NW of Cross Plains to W of Portland	Robertson, Sumner	TN	36.5723°N 86.7618°W	11:02–11:14	9.41 mi (15.14 km)	50 yd (46 m)
EF0	Two outbuildings were destroyed and a shed was blown into a road and destroyed. A barn was damaged. Numerous trees were uprooted and snapped and one tree fell on a home.						
EF0	NW of Goodlettsville to SE of Millersville	Davidson, Sumner	TN	36.348°N 86.7939°W	11:03–11:12	6.38 mi (10.27 km)	200 yd (180 m)
EF0	Dozens of trees and power lines were blown down.						
EF0	White House	Robertson, Sumner	TN	36.4684°N 86.6593°W	11:10–11:12	0.71 mi (1.14 km)	25 yd (23 m)
EF0	A brief, weak tornado blew the metal roofs of a building and a nearby business in White House. Several homes suffered minor roof damage. Trees were knocked down.						
EF0	Gallatin	Sumner	TN	36.3542°N 86.5601°W	11:21–11:25	3.89 mi (6.26 km)	50 yd (46 m)
EF0	Two large barns were destroyed and some trees, signs, and power poles were blown down in Gallatin.						
EF0	SE of Gallatin to SSE of Castalian Springs	Sumner	TN	36.3567°N 86.4174°W	11:31–11:39	6.87 mi (11.06 km)	50 yd (46 m)
EF0	Numerous trees were blown down.						
EF0	N of Castalian Springs to W of Hartsville	Sumner, Trousdale	TN	36.4226°N 86.3137°W	11:38–11:44	5.05 mi (8.13 km)	200 yd (180 m)
EF0	Several homes were damaged and a barn was heavily damaged. Numerous trees were blown down.						
EF0	E of Hartsville	Trousdale	TN	36.3945°N 86.1153°W	11:54–11:58	3.27 mi (5.26 km)	50 yd (46 m)
EF0	A business was damaged and trees were blown down.						
EF0	Lafayette	Macon	TN	36.5314°N 86.0504°W	11:56–11:58	1.93 mi (3.11 km)	25 yd (23 m)
EF0	A convenience store in town partially lost its roof, and trees were blown down.						
EF0	S of Alexandria	DeKalb	TN	36.0571°N 86.0347°W	12:20–12:21	1.04 mi (1.67 km)	25 yd (23 m)
EF0	Tree and structural damage occurred along U.S. 70. The roof and back porch were blown off of a house.						
EF0	NE of Smithville	DeKalb	TN	36.0021°N 85.8028°W	12:43–12:49	4.81 mi (7.74 km)	200 yd (180 m)
EF0	Several homes and barns were damaged, and trees were blown down.						
EF0	Sparta	White	TN	35.9738°N 85.4938°W	13:07–13:09	1.11 mi (1.79 km)	50 yd (46 m)
EF0	A barn was heavily damaged and trees were blown down.						
EF1	WNW of Braxton to W of Puckett	Rankin	MS	32.0521°N 90.0492°W	14:01–14:31	9.7 mi (15.6 km)	75 yd (69 m)
EF1	This tornado crossed US 49 and struck the Piney Woods School, producing minor damage toi the structure. One home sustained shingle damage, and a shed outbuilding was damaged. Trees were snapped or uprooted.						
EF0	Higdon	Jackson	AL	34.8445°N 85.6401°W	14:44–14:45	0.55 mi (0.89 km)	50 yd (46 m)
EF0	A house in Higdon suffered minor roof damage and a carport was destroyed by this brief tornado. A few trees were also uprooted.						
EF0	SE of Dahlonega	Lumpkin	GA	34.4797°N 83.9624°W	17:21–17:32	4.7 mi (7.6 km)	350 yd (320 m)
EF0	This tornado snapped and uprooted several trees in southeastern Lumpkin County. Additionally, a few houses and sheds had minor roof and/or siding damage.						
EF0	WSW of Alto to NNE of Archibald	Richland	LA	32.3547°N 91.917°W	18:13–18:21	8.55 mi (13.76 km)	700 yd (640 m)
EF0	Tree limbs were snapped, trees were uprooted, and a few small trees were snapped. One tree fall on a mobile home, and some structures sustained roof damage from falling trees and limbs.						
EF1	NW of Force	Elk	PA	41.3053°N 78.5175°W	18:51–18:52	0.60 mi (0.97 km)	125 yd (114 m)
EF1	Trees were damaged along the path. A tornado debris signature was also observed on radar.						
EF1	WSW of Mound, LA to SE of Vicksburg, MS	Madison (LA), Warren (MS)	LA, MS	32.3222°N 91.115°W	18:59–19:17	17.73 mi (28.53 km)	600 yd (550 m)
EF1	Buildings and vehicles were damaged, mainly from falling trees. Two utility poles were snapped, and many trees were uprooted and snapped or had broken limbs.						
EF0	NE of Bentonia	Yazoo	MS	32.728°N 90.3697°W	19:22–19:32	9.21 mi (14.82 km)	250 yd (230 m)
EF0	Large tree limbs were snapped and several trees were uprooted. A few large hardwood trees were uprooted, and several trees were snapped in the most intense area of damage.						
EF1	NNW of Bolton to NNW of Brandon	Hinds, Madison, Rankin	MS	32.4641°N 90.5194°W	19:24–19:55	30.70 mi (49.41 km)	880 yd (800 m)
EF1	This tornado first touched down northwest of the community of Brownsville where it started snapping and uprooting trees as it moved southeast. A shed was destroyed also destroyed by falling tree limbs, and a power pole was snapped near US 49. The tornado damaged homes and outbuildings as it entered the northwestern side of Jackson. Minor damage to structures and trees continued along the path as the tornado moved through a densely populated area. The tornado lifted shortly before crossing SR 471.						
EF1	W of Lena to NW of Sebastopol	Leake	MS	32.5982°N 89.6168°W	20:06–20:20	14.97 mi (24.09 km)	1,050 yd (960 m)
EF1	Several trees were snapped and uprooted. A gas station canopy near Walnut Grove was damaged and a pieces of sheet metal was peeled from a barn.						
EF1	S of Winnsboro Mills	Fairfield	SC	34.3035°N 81.1407°W	20:23–20:29	3.9 mi (6.3 km)	300 yd (270 m)
EF1	Numerous trees were uprooted and snapped, and several homes sustained roof and siding damage. At the Fairfield County Airport, a hangar had two of its external walls pushed out and five small aircraft were damaged, one of which was destroyed after being removed from its tie-down ropes and thrown 100 yards into a field.						
EF1	SW of Duffee to W of Collinsville	Newton, Lauderdale	MS	32.4586°N 88.9638°W	20:43–20:48	5.54 mi (8.92 km)	400 yd (370 m)
EF1	Several trees were snapped and uprooted. Three outbuildings sustained roof damage.						
EF1	Toomsuba	Lauderdale	MS	32.4099°N 88.5223°W	21:08–21:12	3.47 mi (5.58 km)	450 yd (410 m)
EF1	This tornado touched down near the Toomsuba exit of I-20/59 and moved through Toomsuba, where several trees were snapped or uprooted. A barn sustained roof damage northeast of town, and a few homes had siding damage.						
EF0	N of Sprott to N of Pletcher	Perry, Chilton	AL	32.7381°N 87.2159°W	22:19–22:44	24.84 mi (39.98 km)	620 yd (570 m)
EF0	Trees were snapped or uprooted.						
EF1	Prattville to northern Montgomery	Autauga, Elmore, Montgomery	AL	32.4707°N 86.4421°W	23:17–23:28	10.63 mi (17.11 km)	330 yd (300 m)
EF1	Many homes, a Bass Pro Shop west of I-65, and several hotels east of the interstate in Prattville sustained roof damage. A Chevron gas station had many metal panels removed from the gas pump canopy. Trees were snapped or uprooted, including some that fell onto homes damaging them.						
EF0	S of Shorter	Macon	AL	32.3667°N 85.9491°W	23:46–23:49	2.17 mi (3.49 km)	50 yd (46 m)
EF0	A brief tornado uprooted softwood trees. Much of the path was inaccessible.						

== Impact ==
Over 152,000 customers lost power at the height of the storm in Mississippi. In addition, on May 3, a ground stop was issued at Dallas Fort Worth International Airport.

== See also ==
- List of North American tornadoes and tornado outbreaks
