= Mountainburg School District =

School district in Arkansas

Location
- 129 Hwy 71 SW; Mountainburg, Arkansas 72946 United States

District information
- Grades: PK–12
- Accreditation: Arkansas Department of Education
- Schools: 3
- NCES District ID: 0510260

Students and staff
- Students: 716
- Teachers: 54.10 (on FTE basis)
- Staff: 121.10 (on FTE basis)
- Student–teacher ratio: 13.23
- Athletic conference: 2A Region 5 (2012–14)
- District mascot: Dragon
- Colors: Royal blue White

Other information
- Website: www.mountainburg.org

Mountainburg School District 16 (MSD) is a public school district based in Mountainburg, Arkansas. MPSD encompasses 195.40 square miles (506.1 km^{2}) of land in Crawford County and serves all or portions of the communities of Mountain Pine, Winslow, Mulberry, Chester, Alma and Rudy.

The school district and its schools located along U.S. Route 71 serves more than 700 students with more than 120 faculty and staff at its three schools. The district and schools' mascot is the Dragon with royal blue and white serving as the colors.

== Schools ==
- Mountainburg High School, serving more than 275 students in grades 9 through 12.
- Mountainburg Middle School, serving more than 325 students in grades 5 through grade 8.
- Mountainburg Elementary School, serving more than 325 students in prekindergarten through grade 6.
