= Dwight Sloan =

American football player (1914–1998)

No. 36
- Positions: Fullback, halfback, quarterback

Personal information
- Born: April 17, 1914; Rudy, Arkansas, U.S.
- Died: March 18, 1998 (aged 83); San Antonio, Texas, U.S.
- Listed height: 5 ft 10 in (1.78 m)
- Listed weight: 180 lb (82 kg)

Career information
- High school: Alma (Alma, Arkansas); Van Buren (Van Buren, Arkansas)
- College: Arkansas
- NFL draft: 1938: 10th round, 85th overall pick

Career history
- Chicago Cardinals (1938); Detroit Lions (1939–1940)

Awards and highlights
- Second-team All-SWC (1937)

Career NFL statistics
- TD–INT: 3–18
- Passing yards: 1,251
- Passer rating: 33.1
- Stats at Pro Football Reference

Dwight Henry "Paddlefoot" Sloan (April 7, 1914 – March 18, 1998) was an American professional football player who was a tailback, halfback, and fullback. He played in the National Football League (NFL) for the Chicago Cardinals (1938) and Detroit Lions (1939-1940). He also played college football for the Arkansas Razorbacks from 1935 to 1937.

== Early life ==
Sloan was born in 1914 in Rudy, Arkansas. He attended Alma and Van Buren High Schools.

== Arkansas Razorbacks ==
Sloan played halfback and quarterback for the Arkansas Razorbacks football team from 1935 to 1937. He led the 1936 Arkansas Razorbacks football team to the program's first undisputed Southwest Conference championship. Sloan completed 47 of 105 passes for 672 yards in 1936. As a senior in 1937, he ranked second in passing among the nation's college football players. In December 1937, Sloan ranked second in voting by Arkansas sports editors conducted by the Associated Press to select the leading sports performer in Arkansas.

== Professional football ==
Sloan was selected by the Chicago Cardinals in the 10th round, 85th overall pick, of the 1938 NFL draft. He appeared in ten games for the Cardinals in 1938 and ranked ninth in the NFL with 37 passes completed. He tallied 333 passing yards and 126 rushing yards.

In June 1939, the Cardinals traded Sloan to the Detroit Lions in exchange for Vern Huffman. Sloan appeared in ten games for the Lions in 1939 and ranked among the NFL leaders with 883 yards of total offense (seventh), 45 completed passes (seventh), 102 pass attempts (seventh), and 655 passing yards (eighth).

In 1940, Sloan appeared in 11 games for the Lions, completing 18 of 46 passes for 260 yards with zero touchdowns and eight interceptions. He also tallied 225 rushing yards on 58 carries. Sloan was a two-way player and intercepted eight passes in 1940.

== Later life ==
At the end of the 1940 season, Sloan enlisted in the Army. As of February 1941, he was a lieutenant assigned to a camp in Minnesota. He continued to serve in the Army during the duration of World War II.

Sloan died in March 1998 at age 83 in San Antonio.
