= Arrest of Randal Worcester =

2022 arrest

- Date: August 21, 2022
- Time: 10:40 am (CDT)
- Venue: Kountry Xpress convenience store
- Location: Mulberry, Arkansas, United States; 35.5129°N 94.1143°W
- Target: Randal Worcester
- Arrests: 1
- Charges: Worcester: second-degree assault and battery, among others White and King: use of excessive force
- Verdict: Worcester: acquitted
- Convictions: White: felony deprivation of rights under color of law King: misdemeanor deprivation of rights under color of law
- Sentence: White: 63 months King: 1 year

On August 21, 2022, Randal Ray Worcester, a 27-year-old white man, was violently arrested in Mulberry, Arkansas, United States by three law enforcement officers: Crawford County Sheriff deputies Levi White and Zack King, and Mulberry police officer Thell Riddle. A bystander's video of the arrest was posted online that day and spread widely across social media. By the next day, the three officers had been suspended with pay while state and federal authorities investigated the officers. Worcester filed a federal lawsuit against the officers and their departments eight days after the incident.

The Crawford County Sheriff announced the firings of deputies King and White in October 2022. White and King, in January 2023, received a federal charge of using excessive force, and both initially pled not guilty. Riddle returned to work in February 2023 after he was not charged by a federal grand jury and a state prosecutor. Before White and King went on trial, they changed their pleas to guilty in April 2024, with White admitting to a felony count of deprivation of rights and King admitting to a misdemeanor count of deprivation of rights. In October 2024, White was sentenced to five years and three months in prison, while King was sentenced to one year in prison.

== Incident ==
At around 10:00 am on Sunday, August 21, 2022, a convenience store clerk made a police report about a man in "gray, greasy pants"; the clerk alleged telling the man not to sit on the curb in front of the convenience store in Alma, Arkansas, to which the man responded by spitting on him and repeatedly telling him to "get back in the store or he would cut my face up"; the man left after making the threat.

At around 10:40 am that day, Randal Ray Worcester, a 27-year-old man from Goose Creek, South Carolina, was arrested by three law enforcement officers: Crawford County sheriff's deputies Zack King and Levi White, and Mulberry police officer Thell Riddle. The location of the arrest was outside a Kountry Xpress convenience store in Mulberry, Arkansas, around 11 miles east of Alma.

The following narrative of events was given by Crawford County Sheriff Jimmy Damante: as a result of the Alma incident, law enforcement were ordered to "be on the lookout" for Worcester, who rode his bicycle to the Mulberry Kountry Xpress, where a sheriff's deputy saw him. Worcester initially cooperated with the officers, said Damante. When an officer asked Worcester if he had any weapons, Worcester said he did, and at some point Worcester handed a weapon to an officer, indicated Damante on August 22. Worcester apparently became violent when the officers tried to take him into custody, said Damante. None of the responding law enforcement officers wore body cameras, but there was a dashcam video of the incident from the Mulberry police officer's vehicle, stated Damante.

The Associated Press reported: "Police said when the officers confronted the man, he pushed a deputy to the ground and punched the back of his head, leading to the arrest seen in the video."

The following narrative of events was given by a lawyer for Deputy Levi White on August 22: White confronted Worcester, who provided a false identity and "became irate and viciously attacked Deputy White by grabbing him by the legs, lifting him up and body slamming him, head first, on the concrete parking lot", then Worcester "continued to resist arrest, spit and bite at the officers, and refused to allow the officers to get the handcuffs on him- hence the necessity for three officers".

The following narrative of events was given in the filing for Worcester's federal lawsuit by his lawyers on August 29: When Worcester was confronted by the officers, he "was compliant as he explained" to them the earlier incident, where Worcester said he had asked for water from the store employee, who "became angry with him and asked him to leave the store"; Worcester told the officers about a "small pocketknife in his pocket but immediately gave it over to officers", so the officers knew that Worcester "was not armed". The filing continues that "without provocation, Defendant White aggressively attempted to put Mr. Worcester’s arms behind his back in an effort to handcuff him, without stating any reason for doing so. At no time did the Defendant Officers inform Mr. Worcester of his Miranda right when being handcuffed", and at no time did the officers "attempt to use de-escalation tactics or subdue Mr. Worcester with a taser and/or pepper spray". The filing continues that "a physical altercation ensued", Worcester was "tackled to the ground" and restrained, with the officers continuing to "repeatedly punch, kick and knee" Worcester, and alleges that deputy White picked up Worcester's head and "slammed his face and head into the concrete pavement".

=== Bystander's video ===
A 34-second video of the arrest, taken by a bystander, was posted online on TikTok on August 21. The video then spread across social media, garnering millions of views.

The footage showed one officer holding Worcester down on the ground while the other two officers beat Worcester. One officer lifts and slams Worcester's head into the pavement, and also punched Worcester in the face multiple times. The other officer kneed Worcester in the side and in the back.

BuzzFeed News describes the video showing that "Worcester appears to be pinned to the concrete and largely unable to move much more than attempting to shield his face with his hands as the officers beat him repeatedly". BBC News describes the video showing that Worcester "covers his head with his hands and appears to be trying to roll up into a ball to protect himself."

Also in the video, a woman is heard shouting to the officers: "Don't beat him, he needs his medicine!" Meanwhile, one officer shouts to the filming bystander to "back the fuck up". The video ends when an officer points at the filming bystander and issues an order to stop filming.

=== Post-arrest ===
Arkansas State Police stated on August 21 that Worcester was first treated in a hospital, and then jailed in the Crawford County jail in Van Buren, Arkansas, having been charged with second-degree battery, resisting arrest, refusal to submit, possessing an instrument of crime, criminal trespass, criminal mischief, terroristic threatening and second-degree assault. On August 22, 2022, Worcester was released from jail after a $15,000 bond was posted.

Worcester's jury trial was scheduled for June 2025.

== Aftermath ==
=== Investigations and firings ===
The Arkansas State Police stated on August 21 that they are investigating the use of physical force by the three law enforcement officers. On August 22, the Arkansas State Police confirmed that the three law enforcement officers had been suspended with pay.

On August 22, the United States Department of Justice stated that they had started a civil rights investigation into the incident, with the Federal Bureau of Investigation also participating.

In October 2022, the Crawford County Sheriff announced that two involved officers, Levi White and Zachary King, had been fired.

In February 2023, involved officer Thell Riddle resumed work after a federal grand jury and a state prosecutor declined to charge Riddle regarding the incident.

=== Federal lawsuit ===
On August 29, Worcester's lawyers filed a federal lawsuit on his behalf against the three officers who arrested him, as well as their departments, the Crawford County Sheriff's Office, the Mulberry Police Department, and their respective leaders Jimmy Damante and Shannon Gregory. The lawsuit is regarding potential violations of the Fourth Amendment to the United States Constitution (against unreasonable searches and seizures by the government) and Fourteenth Amendment to the United States Constitution (the right for everyone to be protected under the law), and potential "negligence, assault, excessive force, and battery" by the officers.

=== Reactions ===
Mulberry Mayor Gary Baxter stated on August 21 that he was "shocked and sickened" after viewing footage of the arrest.

Arkansas Governor Asa Hutchinson held a press conference on August 22 to address the incident, where he said that it was "reprehensible in conduct" when "a suspect is beaten in that fashion", with the officers' response being "not consistent with the training they received" as law enforcement officers in Arkansas.

A man and a woman came forward on August 23 in a press conference, alleging that Crawford County sheriff's deputy Levi White recently used excessive force against them in separate arrests, and that the Crawford County sheriff's office ignored their complaints. The man stated that he was beaten with a baton and a stun gun was used multiple times on him during the arrest; ultimately his "head was split open" and he had multiple bruises and abrasions. The woman said that when she took a video of White, he grabbed her arm, swung her around, threw her phone, wrapped his arm around her neck, sent her to the ground, kneed her side, and then proceeded to “smash her face” into the ground.

The Associated Press reported policing experts as stating that the video showed "red flags" about the officers' actions, since they had Worcester pinned to the ground from the start of the video. Geoffrey Alpert, a University of South Carolina criminology professor studying the use of force on police, stated that officers could use "pain strikes to get compliance" from a resisting suspect, but such strikes are "not a blow to the head". Philip Stinson, a Bowling Green State University criminologist and former law enforcement officer, stated that if Worcester had earlier attacked an officer, then the officers beating him may have been punitive, but this would not be legally justified.

Two CNN senior law enforcement analysts stated that even if Worcester attacked the officers as alleged, the officers appeared to use excessive force in the video. Andrew McCabe, a former deputy director of the FBI, stated that the officers did not seem to be using any accepted techniques for handcuffing a suspect. Charles H. Ramsey, a former Philadelphia Police commissioner, stated that "blows to the head" would produce the opposite effect if law enforcement were "trying to get a person to put their hands behind their back", because the suspect would be inclined to "lift your hands to try to protect your face".

=== Federal convictions for excessive force ===
In January 2023, the Justice Department announced that former deputies Levi White and Zackary King had been indicted by a federal grand jury regarding excessive force in the arrest of Worcester; King and White pled not guilty that month. The third involved officer, Thell Riddle, was not indicted. King and White's trials were scheduled for May 2024.

King on April 15, 2024, changed his plea to guilty for a misdemeanor count of deprivation of rights under color of law, while White on April 19, 2024, changed his plea to guilty for a felony count of deprivation of rights under color of law. On October 9, 2024, White was sentenced to five years and three months in federal prison, followed by two years of supervised release. The next day, King was sentenced to one year in federal prison and then one year of supervised release.

White appealed his sentence in March 2025 to the United States Court of Appeals for the Eighth Circuit, pointing to the "disparate outcome of these two defendants accused of the same crime".
