= Henry Pope =

Henry Pope may refer to:

- Henry Martin Pope (1843–1908), English painter
- Henry Nelson Pope (1859–1956), Texas farmer
- Henry Pope (Prison Break), a character from the TV series Prison Break
