= Mountainburg High School =

Location
- 129 Hwy 71 SW; Mountainburg, Arkansas 72946; United States; 35°38′6″N 94°10′3″W

Information
- Superintendent: Dennis Copeland
- CEEB code: 041735
- NCES School ID: 051026000751
- Principal: Jason Rutherford
- Teaching staff: 31.51 (on FTE basis)
- Grades: 9–12
- Enrollment: 185 (2023–2024)
- Student to teacher ratio: 5.87
- Website: www.mountainburg.org
- Mountainburg High School
- Formerly listed on the U.S. National Register of Historic Places
- Location within Arkansas Location within the United States
- Location: US 71, Mountainburg, Arkansas
- Architectural style: Late 19th And Early 20th Century American Movements, Plain Tradition
- MPS: Public Schools in the Ozarks MPS
- NRHP reference No.: 92001216
Significant dates
- Added to NRHP: 1992
- Removed from NRHP: October 19, 2001

Mountainburg High School is a comprehensive public high school in Mountainburg, Arkansas, United States. Mountainburg is one of five public high schools in Crawford County and the sole high school of the Mountainburg School District. The high school serves more than 200 students in grades 9 through 12.

== Academics ==
The assumed course of study follows the Smart Core curriculum developed by the Arkansas Department of Education (ADE), which requires students to complete a minimum of 22 units to graduate. Students complete regular courses and exams and may elect to complete Advanced Placement (AP) coursework and exams with the opportunity to obtain college credit.

According to the district's student handbook, exceptional students who have completed at least 26 units and additional requirements related to grade point average, number of AP classes and foreign language classes may receive the distinction of Graduating with Honors, Graduating with High Honors, or Graduating with Highest Honors.

Mountainburg High School maintains affiliations with Arkansas Tech University–Ozark Campus and Western Arkansas Technical Center to allow students to take college courses and obtain concurrent credit.

== Extracurricular activities ==
The Mountainburg High School mascot is the dragon with royal blue and white serving as the school colors.

For 2012–14, the Mountainburg Dragons compete in interscholastic sports at the 2A Classification administered by the Arkansas Activities Association. For football, the Dragons compete in the 2A Region 4 Conference; for basketball, Mountainburg is placed in the 2A Region 4 West Conference.

In the early 2000s, Mountainburg was one of several small Arkansas high schools for which it was challenging to field an 11-man football team. The school canceled three games in 2002 because of injuries to players and was unable to field a team in 2003.

== History ==
A building associated with the school was listed on the National Register of Historic Places in 1992, but the listing was removed from the National Register in 2001.
