= Alma School District =

Alma School District may refer to:

- Alma School District (Arkansas)
- Alma Public Schools (Michigan)
- Alma School District (Wisconsin), a school district in Wisconsin

== See also ==
- School District of Alma Center-Humbird-Merrillan
