= Mountainburg, Arkansas =

- City
- Location of Mountainburg in Crawford County, Arkansas.
- Coordinates: 35°36′15″N 94°10′09″W
- Country: United States
- State: Arkansas
- County: Crawford

Area
  - Total: 1.47 sq mi (3.81 km^{2})
  - Land: 1.47 sq mi (3.81 km^{2})
  - Water: 0 sq mi (0.00 km^{2})
- Elevation: 837 ft (255 m)

Population (2020)
  - Total: 528
  - Estimate (2025): 535 ▲
  - Density: 358.8/sq mi (138.53/km^{2})
- Time zone: UTC-6 (Central (CST))
  - Summer (DST): UTC-5 (CDT)
- ZIP code: 72946
- Area code: 479
- FIPS code: 05-47300
- GNIS feature ID: 2404334
- Website: mountainburg.gov

Mountainburg is a town in Crawford County, Arkansas, United States. It is part of the Fort Smith, Arkansas-Oklahoma Metropolitan Statistical Area. As of the 2020 census, Mountainburg had a population of 528.

Mountainburg was laid out in 1883 when the St. Louis–San Francisco Railway was extended to that point.

== Geography ==
Dinosaur statue in the city park

Mountainburg is located along U.S. Route 71, and thrived when this road was the main route in northwest Arkansas. Since the construction of Interstate 540 (now Interstate 49) to the west, it has been a sleepier community. The city park in downtown Mountainburg has since 1980 hosted two large dinosaur models.

Lake Fort Smith State Park, which is situated on the western side of the 1,400 acres (5.7 km^{2}) Lake Fort Smith, is located 8 miles (13 km) north of Mountainburg.

According to the United States Census Bureau, the city has a total area of 1.5 square miles (3.9 km^{2}), all land.

== Demographics ==
Historical population
Census	Pop.	Note	%±
1930	213		—
1940	185		−13.1%
1950	405		118.9%
1960	402		−0.7%
1970	524		30.3%
1980	595		13.5%
1990	488		−18.0%
2000	682		39.8%
2010	631		−7.5%
2020	528		−16.3%
2025 (est.)	535	▲	1.3%
U.S. Decennial Census

=== 2020 census ===
Mountainburg racial composition
Race	Number	Percentage
White (non-Hispanic)	450	85.23%
Native American	17	3.22%
Asian	1	0.19%
Other/Mixed	43	8.14%
Hispanic or Latino	17	3.22%

As of the 2020 United States census, there were 528 people, 252 households, and 136 families residing in the city.

=== 2000 census ===
At the 2000 census there were 682 people in 271 households, including 179 families, in the city. The population density was 478.1 inhabitants per square mile (184.6/km^{2}). There were 298 housing units at an average density of 208.9 per square mile (80.7/km^{2}). The racial makeup of the city was 95.45% White, 0.15% Black or African American, 3.08% Native American, 0.15% Pacific Islander, 0.59% from other races, and 0.59% from two or more races. 0.59% of the population were Hispanic or Latino of any race. Of the 271 households 35.8% had children under the age of 18 living with them, 52.0% were married couples living together, 10.7% had a female householder with no husband present, and 33.6% were non-families. 30.6% of households were one person and 16.2% were one person aged 65 or older. The average household size was 2.52 and the average family size was 3.15.

The age distribution was 29.2% under the age of 18, 8.2% from 18 to 24, 26.4% from 25 to 44, 20.8% from 45 to 64, and 15.4% 65 or older. The median age was 34 years. For every 100 females, there were 97.1 males. For every 100 females age 18 and over, there were 89.4 males.

The median household income was $25,446 and the median family income was $33,295. Males had a median income of $24,375 versus $21,806 for females. The per capita income for the city was $14,445. About 12.0% of families and 17.3% of the population were below the poverty line, including 22.2% of those under age 18 and 20.1% of those age 65 or over.

== Notable person ==
- Jim Clark (1902–1974), bank robber and Depression-era outlaw
- Henry Nelson Pope (1859–1956), president of the Texas Farmers Union

== Climate ==
The climate in this area is characterized by hot, humid summers and generally mild to cool winters. According to the Köppen Climate Classification system, Mountainburg has a humid subtropical climate, abbreviated "Cfa" on climate maps.

Climate data for Mountainburg, Arkansas, 1991–2020 normals, extremes 1954–present
Month	Jan	Feb	Mar	Apr	May	Jun	Jul	Aug	Sep	Oct	Nov	Dec	Year
Record high °F (°C)	76 (24)	86 (30)	92 (33)	93 (34)	96 (36)	103 (39)	108 (42)	111 (44)	108 (42)	96 (36)	87 (31)	79 (26)	111 (44)
Mean maximum °F (°C)	69.2 (20.7)	74.0 (23.3)	80.9 (27.2)	85.5 (29.7)	89.0 (31.7)	93.8 (34.3)	99.0 (37.2)	99.9 (37.7)	94.1 (34.5)	87.3 (30.7)	77.2 (25.1)	69.7 (20.9)	101.2 (38.4)
Mean daily maximum °F (°C)	49.3 (9.6)	54.4 (12.4)	62.9 (17.2)	71.6 (22.0)	78.9 (26.1)	86.9 (30.5)	91.6 (33.1)	91.4 (33.0)	84.2 (29.0)	73.6 (23.1)	60.9 (16.1)	51.6 (10.9)	71.4 (21.9)
Daily mean °F (°C)	37.5 (3.1)	41.8 (5.4)	49.8 (9.9)	58.6 (14.8)	66.9 (19.4)	75.3 (24.1)	79.5 (26.4)	78.4 (25.8)	71.3 (21.8)	60.3 (15.7)	48.6 (9.2)	40.2 (4.6)	59.0 (15.0)
Mean daily minimum °F (°C)	25.8 (−3.4)	29.2 (−1.6)	36.7 (2.6)	45.6 (7.6)	54.8 (12.7)	63.8 (17.7)	67.4 (19.7)	65.5 (18.6)	58.4 (14.7)	47.0 (8.3)	36.3 (2.4)	28.8 (−1.8)	46.6 (8.1)
Mean minimum °F (°C)	10.6 (−11.9)	14.9 (−9.5)	20.8 (−6.2)	30.0 (−1.1)	39.8 (4.3)	52.8 (11.6)	58.7 (14.8)	55.9 (13.3)	44.2 (6.8)	31.0 (−0.6)	21.9 (−5.6)	15.0 (−9.4)	7.2 (−13.8)
Record low °F (°C)	−10 (−23)	−11 (−24)	6 (−14)	20 (−7)	31 (−1)	41 (5)	47 (8)	44 (7)	32 (0)	18 (−8)	5 (−15)	−9 (−23)	−11 (−24)
Average precipitation inches (mm)	3.32 (84)	3.05 (77)	4.53 (115)	5.26 (134)	6.29 (160)	4.49 (114)	4.12 (105)	4.06 (103)	5.08 (129)	4.86 (123)	4.69 (119)	3.67 (93)	53.42 (1,356)
Average snowfall inches (cm)	1.8 (4.6)	0.7 (1.8)	0.5 (1.3)	0.0 (0.0)	0.0 (0.0)	0.0 (0.0)	0.0 (0.0)	0.0 (0.0)	0.0 (0.0)	0.0 (0.0)	0.0 (0.0)	0.1 (0.25)	3.1 (7.95)
Average precipitation days (≥ 0.01 in)	7.5	7.0	9.4	8.8	10.6	9.2	7.6	7.3	7.3	7.9	8.0	7.5	98.1
Average snowy days (≥ 0.1 in)	0.4	0.4	0.2	0.0	0.0	0.0	0.0	0.0	0.0	0.0	0.0	0.4	1.4
Source 1: NOAA
Source 2: National Weather Service

== Education ==
Public education is provided by the Mountainburg School District. The District includes Mountainburg Elementary School, Mountainburg Middle School, and Mountainburg High School.
