= Alma School District (Arkansas) =

School district in Arkansas

Location
- 916 Hwy 64 East; Alma, Arkansas 72921 United States

District information
- Grades: K–12
- Schools: 4
- NCES District ID: 0502250

Students and staff
- Students: 3,415
- Faculty: 219.02 (on FTE basis)
- Student–teacher ratio: 15.59

Other information
- Website: Alma School District

The Alma School District is a public school district based in Alma, Arkansas, United States. The district provides public access to education for students in kindergarten through grade 12 in Alma and surrounding areas of Crawford County. The district is a member of the Western Arkansas Educational Service Cooperative (WAESC), which was formed to assist school districts to work collectively and maximize educational funding by providing shared services to schools and students in western Arkansas.

== Schools ==
The Alma School District has one primary school, one intermediate school, one middle school and one high school.

=== Secondary education ===
The Alma School District was one of four Arkansas school districts recognized in the 4th Annual AP District Honor Roll as being honored for increasing access to AP course work while simultaneously maintaining or increasing the percentage of students earning scores of 3 or higher on Advanced Placement (AP) Exams from 2011 to 2013.

- Alma High School—grades 9 through 12.
- Alma Middle School—grades 6 through 8.

=== Elementary education ===
- Alma Intermediate School—grades 3 through 5.
- Alma Primary School—kindergarten through grade 2.
