= Disappearance of Morgan Nick =

Child who disappeared in Arkansas, 1995

Morgan Nick
- Nick at age 6
- Born: Morgan Chauntel Nick; September 12, 1988; West Germany
- Disappeared: June 9, 1995 (aged 6); Wofford baseball field, Alma, Arkansas, U.S. 35.47573°N 94.22329°W
- Status: Missing for 31 years, 4 months and 4 days
- Known for: Missing person Inspiration for the Morgan Nick Foundation
- Parent(s): Colleen Nick (mother); John Nick (father)
- Distinguishing features: Caucasian female. 4 ft 0 in (120 cm), 55 pounds. Blonde hair, blue eyes. Five visible silver caps on molars.

Morgan Chauntel Nick (born September 12, 1988; disappeared June 9, 1995) is an American girl who disappeared in Alma, Arkansas, at age six. She attended a Little League Baseball game at the Wofford baseball field with her family, and was last seen by eyewitnesses tapping sand from her shoes in the parking lot, after being allowed by her mother, Colleen, to briefly catch fireflies with other children. She is believed to have been abducted very shortly after this sighting.

Subsequent forensic developments strongly indicated that Billy Jack Lincks, a child sex offender, was involved in Nick's abduction, making him an official suspect in the case. Lincks died in 2000 at the age of 75 while incarcerated for an unrelated offense. No one has ever been charged with Nick's abduction and likely murder, and the case remains unsolved, though still open and under active investigation.

Colleen Nick has since become an advocate for missing persons in the United States, and founded the Morgan Nick Foundation (MNF), which supports the families of missing children.

== Disappearance ==
On June 9, 1995, Morgan Nick and her mother, Colleen, traveled from their home in Ozark, Arkansas to a Little League baseball game in the town of Alma. The two had been invited by close friends to attend the game and at approximately 10:30 p.m., Morgan and her friends asked their parents if they could leave the stands to catch fireflies. Initially, Morgan's mother was reluctant to allow her daughter to do so, but was eventually convinced by some other parents to let Morgan go. She was last seen at 10:45 p.m. by her friends, emptying sand out of her shoes alone near her mother's car while her friends emptied their own shoes a few dozen feet away. Morgan's friends reported seeing a "creepy" man talking to Morgan as she was putting her shoes back on.

When the game ended shortly thereafter, Morgan's friends returned without her. They told Colleen that Morgan was at her car, but when Colleen returned to the car, her daughter was not there. Morgan was never seen or heard from again.

== Later developments ==
On January 15, 2002, police conducted a dig on a private piece of land in Booneville, Arkansas, after they received a tip that claimed Nick might have been buried there. The tip was "so specific" that police decided to dig; a police dog was also used in the search. Police ended the investigation at 9:30 p.m. and said they did not intend to return to the property.

On November 15, 2010, federal investigators searched a vacant house in Spiro, Oklahoma, for DNA evidence that could show Nick had once been in the house. On December 18, 2017, investigators returned to the house to conduct another search after they received a tip about the case. Cadaver dogs alerted investigators to a well on the property, which they said was the "center of the investigation". The search was called off the next day, after no evidence was found.

As of 2021, new leads in Nick's disappearance continue to be received and "investigated at the local, state, and federal levels". In November, police named Billy Jack Lincks as a person of interest in their investigation. Lincks, who died in prison in 2000, drove a red pickup truck that had been the focus on their investigation since the beginning in 1995. The FBI said that fibers found in the truck were a close match for those from Morgan's t-shirt.

On September 30, 2024, the Alma police chief stated that there had been a "significant development" in the case and a press conference would take place the following day. On October 1, the Alma police department confirmed that new DNA evidence linked a member of the Nick family to the interior of a red truck once belonging to Lincks. Alma Police Chief Jeff Pointer stated that the lab report "strongly indicates that Morgan had been in the truck."

As of 2026, a $60,000 reward for information leading to the recovery of Nick and the arrest of any individual or individuals responsible for her disappearance.

== Aftermath ==
External image
- Age progression of Nick to age 32

In 1996, Colleen Nick founded the Morgan Nick Foundation, which helps parents cope with the disappearances of children, and helps prevent children from going missing. Her case was featured on Unsolved Mysteries and America's Most Wanted, while Morgan's family and the foundation were featured in 2005 on Extreme Makeover: Home Edition after the family's house was damaged in a water heater explosion.

The Amber alert service is named the Morgan Nick Amber Alert in the state of Arkansas.

In August 2012, Tonya Smith and James Monhart, two previously convicted felons, were arrested for computer fraud after attempting to assume the identity of Morgan Nick.

== Media ==
=== Bibliography ===
- Morton, Kristin Samantha (2021). The Disappearance of Morgan Nick. Perth, Scotland: Trellis Publishing. ISBN 979-8-224-95032-4.

=== Documentary ===
- Still Missing Morgan (2023). A four-part ABC News Studios docuseries commissioned by Hulu and casting Lauren Sweetser as Colleen Nick.

== See also ==
- Cold case
- Crime in Arkansas
- List of murdered American children
- List of people who disappeared mysteriously (2000–present)
- National Center for Missing & Exploited Children – American children's rights organization
- Othram – American forensic genealogy company

== Cited works and further reading ==
- Bilchik, Shay (1999). When Your Child Is Missing: A Family Survival Guide. Pennsylvania: Diane Publishing Company. ISBN 978-0-788-17690-6.
- Branson, Jack; Branson, Mary (2011). Delayed Justice: Inside Stories from America's Best Cold Case Investigations. Amherst, New York: Prometheus Books. ISBN 978-1-616-14392-3.
- Collins, James J. (1999). Law Enforcement Policies and Practices Regarding Missing Children and Homeless Youth. United States: Office of Juvenile Justice and Delinquency Prevention. ISBN 978-0-788-18639-4.
- Fisher, Bonnie S.; Lab, Steven P. (2010). Encyclopedia of Victimology and Crime Prevention. Los Angeles: Sage Publishing. ISBN 978-1-412-96047-2.
- Humphrey, LaDonna (2022). The Girl I Never Knew: Who Killed Melissa Witt?. New York City: Genius Book Company. ISBN 978-1-947-52181-0.
- Jones, Terry (2019). Mr. Prosecutor: Ternty-Five Years Fighting Crime in the South: A Memoir: Former Prosecuting Attorney in the 4th Judicial District of Arkansas. Pittsburgh, Pennsylvania: Dorrance Publishing Company. ISBN 978-1-644-26243-6.
- Katz, Hélèna (2010). Cold Cases: Famous Unsolved Mysteries, Crimes, and Disappearances in America. Santa Barbara: Greenwood Publishing Group. ISBN 978-0-313-37692-4.
- Murphy, Paul (2011). Guide for Implementing or Enhancing an Endangered Missing Advisory (EMA). Washington: U. S. Department of Justice. ISBN 978-1-437-98383-8.
- Pettem, Silvia (2017). The Long Term Missing: Hope and Help for Families. Maryland: Rowman & Littlefield. ISBN 978-1-442-25680-4.
- Sprague, Donald F. (2013). Investigating Missing Children Cases: A Guide for First Responders and Investigators. New York: Taylor & LFrancis Group. ISBN 978-1-439-86063-2.
