= Alma High School (Arkansas) =

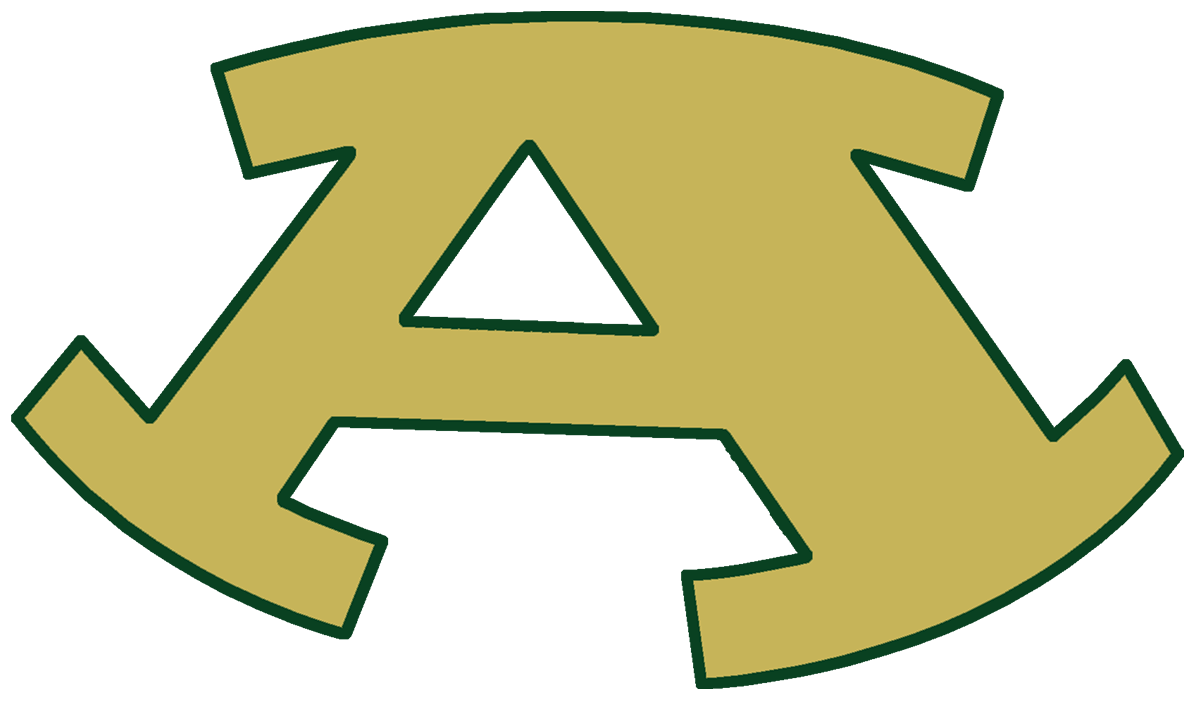

Location
- 101 East Main Street; Alma, Arkansas 72921; United States; 35°28′32″N 94°13′8″W

Information
- Motto: Do Right. Be Kind.
- Status: Open
- School district: Alma School District
- NCES District ID: 0502250
- Authority: Arkansas Department of Education (ADE)
- CEEB code: 040000
- NCES School ID: 050225000004
- Enrollment: 978 (2023-2024)
- Education system: ADE Smart Core curriculum
- Classes offered: Regular (Core & Career Focus) Pre - AP (Pre- Advanced Placement) Advanced Placement (AP)
- Colors: Green and gold
- Athletics conference: 5A West (2012–14, 2016-present) 6A (2014-2015
- Sports: Football, soccer, basketball, baseball, softball, track and field, and volleyball
- Mascot: Airedale Terrier
- Team name: Alma Airedales
- Accreditation: ADE; AdvancED (1951–)
- Affiliation: Arkansas Activities Association
- Website: www.almasd.net/o/ahs

Alma High School is a comprehensive public high school serving students in grades nine through twelve in Alma, Arkansas, United States. It is the sole high school administered by the Alma School District in Crawford County.

== Academics ==
The assumed course of study follows the Smart Core curriculum developed the Arkansas Department of Education (ADE), which requires students to complete 22 credit units before graduation. Students engage in regular and Advanced Placement (AP) coursework and exams. Alma High School is accredited by the ADE and since 1951 by AdvancED.

== Extracurricular activities ==
The mascot throughout the school district is the Airedale Terrier. The school colors incorporate forest green and vegas gold.

=== Athletics ===
The Alma Airedales participate in various interscholastic activities administered by the Arkansas Activities Association with declarations in the following: Baseball, Basketball (B), Basketball (G), Bowling (B), Bowling (G), Competitive Cheer, Cheer, Cross Country (B), Cross Country (G), Competitive Dance, Dance, Football, Golf (B), Golf (G), Soccer (B), Soccer (G), Softball, Swimming (B), Swimming (G), Tennis (B), Tennis (G), Track (B), Track (G), and Volleyball. http://www.ahsaa.org/schools?id=1&school=#district

- Baseball:
  - State Champions: 2002
- Football:
  - State Champions - 1980, 1997, 1998
- Golf:
  - State Champions: 2004
- Basketball (boys):
  - State Champions - 2005, 2011
- Basketball (girls):
  - State Champions - 1976, 1979, 2005
- Dance:
  - State Champions - "2012, 2013, 2014, 2017, 2022, 2023"
- Tennis (B):
  - State Champions - 2005
- Track & field (boys):
  - State Champions - 2004, 2005, 2009
- Track & field (girls):
  - State Champions - 1978, 1984, 1985

=== Visual and performing arts ===
The Alma choral program is one of the state's most successful by winning Best in Class at the Arkansas State Choral Festival sponsored by the Arkansas Choral Directors Association (ArkCDA). Recent wins include:

- 2007 Best in Class:
  - 5A Overall Ensemble (Alma Honor's Men)
  - 5A Male Ensemble (Alma Honor's Men)
  - 5A Overall Large Group (Alma Honor's Choir)
  - 5A Female Chorus (Alma Ladies Chorus)
  - 5A Mixed Choir (Alma Honor's Choir)
- 2008 Best in Class:
  - 5A Overall Ensemble (Alma Honor's Men)
  - 5A Male Ensemble (Alma Honor's Men)
  - 5A Overall Large Group (Alma Honor's Women)
  - 5A Female Chorus (Alma Honor's Women)
- 2009 Best in Class:
  - 5A Overall Ensemble (Alma Chamber Men)
  - 5A Male Ensemble (Alma Chamber Men)
  - 5A Mixed Ensemble (Alma Chamber Choir)
- 2010 Best in Class:
  - 5A Overall Large Group (Alma Chamber Choir)
  - 5A Female Chorus (Alma Honors/Chamber Women)
  - 5A Mixed Chorus (Alma Chamber Choir)
- 2011 Best in Class:
  - 5A Overall Large Group (Alma Chamber Choir)
  - 5A Mixed Chorus (Alma Chamber Choir)
- 2012 Best in Class:
  - 5A Overall Chorus–Large (Alma Chamber Choir)
  - 5A Mixed Chorus–Large (Alma Honors Choir)
  - 5A Female Chorus–Large (Alma Honors/Chamber Women)
  - 5A Overall Chorus–Medium (Alma Chamber Choir)
  - 5A Mixed Chorus–Medium (Alma Chamber Choir)
  - 5A Male Chorus–Medium (Alma Honors/Chamber Men)
- 2013 Best in Class:
  - 5A Overall Chorus–Large (Alma Honors Choir)
  - 5A Mixed Chorus–Large (Alma Honors Choir)
  - 5A Overall Chorus–Medium (Alma Chamber Choir)
  - 5A Mixed Chorus–Medium (Alma Chamber Choir)

== Notable alumni ==
- Cory Brandan (1994)-Musician and lead vocalist for metalcore band Norma Jean
- Bradley Hathaway (2000)—Poet and folk musician.
- Eliah Drinkwitz (2001)—Head coach of the Missouri Tigers football program.
