= Five Points, Texas =

Unincorporated community in Texas, United States

Coordinates: 32°16′42″N 96°54′05″W

Five Points is an unincorporated community in Ellis County, Texas, United States. It is located on Farm to Market Road 876, approximately eight miles southwest of Waxahachie.

The settlement has existed since the late 1800s, and was named for its strategic location where five roads meet. The population in 2000 was 10.

Five Points is part of the Waxahachie Independent School District.

A historic cotton gin there, the Five Points Cotton Gin, was the filming location of at least two scenes in the 1984 Sally Field drama movie Places in the Heart.

On May 3, 2021, a strong EF2 tornado struck the town, causing major roof damage to a home, lesser damage to several other homes, destroying outbuildings, overturning a mobile home, and snapping many trees.
