= Dyer, Arkansas =

- City
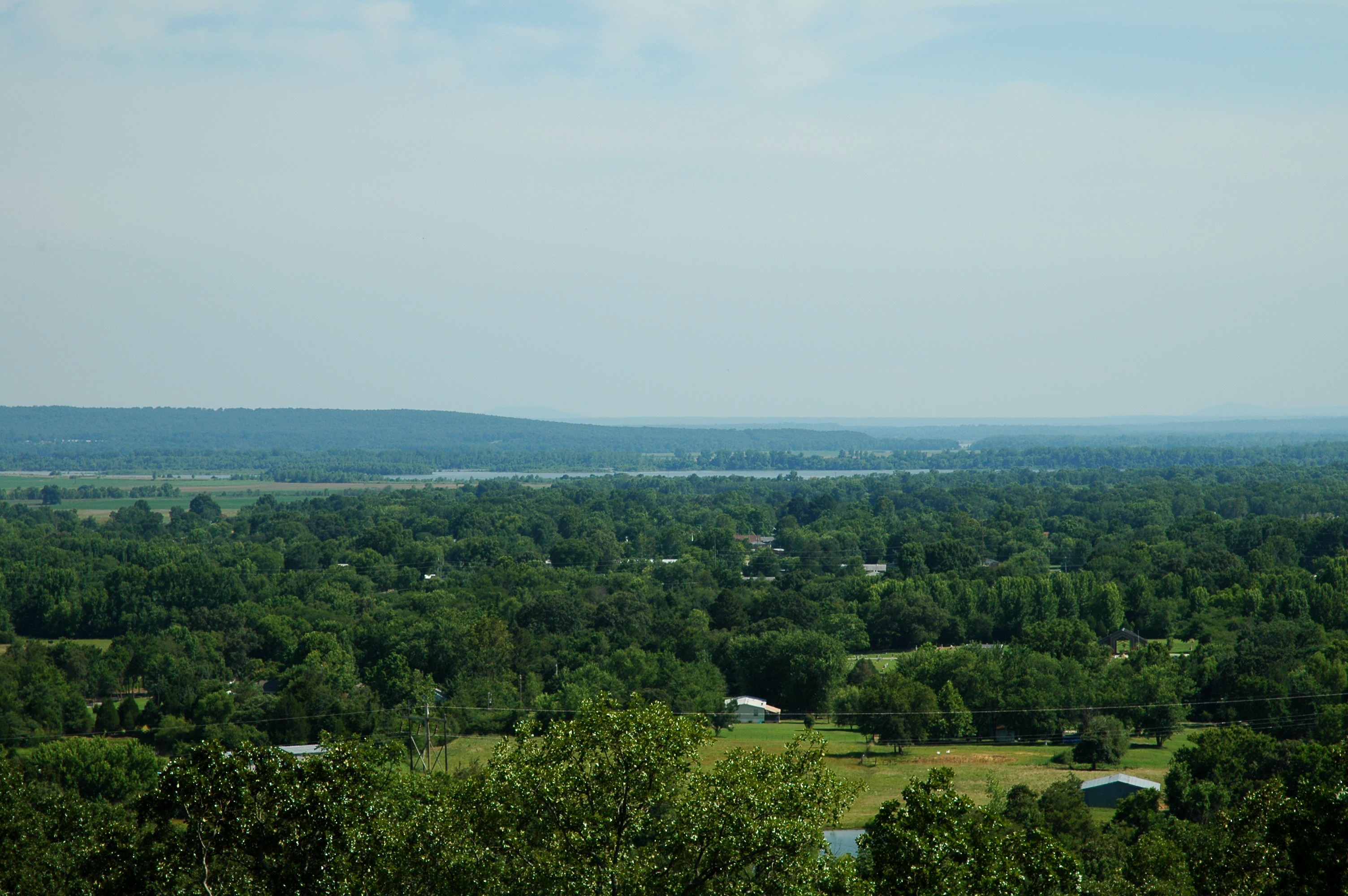
- Outskirts of Dyer with Arkansas River in the background, July 2005

- Location of Dyer in Crawford County, Arkansas.
- Coordinates: 35°29′40″N 94°08′20″W
- Country: United States
- State: Arkansas
- County: Crawford

Area
  - Total: 2.94 sq mi (7.62 km^{2})
  - Land: 2.94 sq mi (7.62 km^{2})
  - Water: 0 sq mi (0.00 km^{2})
- Elevation: 430 ft (130 m)

Population (2020)
  - Total: 772
  - Estimate (2025): 807 ▲
  - Density: 262.5/sq mi (101.36/km^{2})
- Time zone: UTC-6 (Central (CST))
  - Summer (DST): UTC-5 (CDT)
- ZIP code: 72935
- Area code: 479
- FIPS code: 05-20200
- GNIS feature ID: 2403523
- Website: www.cityofdyerar.com

Dyer is a city in Crawford County, Arkansas, United States. It is part of the Fort Smith, Arkansas-Oklahoma Metropolitan Statistical Area. The population was 772 at the 2020 census.

== History ==
Dyer was platted in 1884 by G. E. Dyer soon after the Little Rock and Fort Smith Railroad was extended to that point. The community has the name of the local Dyer family; S. M. Dyer bought the town site in 1870. A post office has been in operation at Dyer since 1885.

== Geography ==
Dyer is located in southeastern Crawford County in the Arkansas River valley. U.S. Route 64 passes through the community, leading west 5 miles (8 km) to Alma and 13 miles (21 km) to Van Buren, the county seat, and east 5 miles (8 km) to Mulberry. Interstate 40 passes through the northern part of Dyer but does not have a direct exit for the city; the nearest access is from Exit 20 in the western part of Mulberry.

According to the United States Census Bureau, Dyer has a total area of 2.6 square miles (6.8 km^{2}), all land.

== Demographics ==
Historical population
Census	Pop.	Note	%±
1900	343		—
1910	433		26.2%
1920	609		40.6%
1930	425		−30.2%
1940	513		20.7%
1950	398		−22.4%
1960	450		13.1%
1970	486		8.0%
1980	608		25.1%
1990	502		−17.4%
2000	585		16.5%
2010	876		49.7%
2020	772		−11.9%
2025 (est.)	807	▲	4.5%
U.S. Decennial Census

=== 2020 census ===
Dyer racial composition
Race	Number	Percentage
White (non-Hispanic)	669	86.66%
Black or African American (non-Hispanic)	9	1.17%
Native American	9	1.17%
Asian	4	0.52%
Other/Mixed	44	5.7%
Hispanic or Latino	37	4.79%

As of the 2020 United States census, there were 772 people, 277 households, and 211 families residing in the city.

=== 2000 census ===
As of the census of 2000, there were 585 people, 230 households, and 163 families residing in the town. The population density was 86.9 people/km^{2} (225 people/mi^{2}). There were 248 housing units at an average density of 36.8 units/km^{2} (95 units/mi^{2}). The racial makeup of the town was 96.24% White, 0.17% Black or African American, 1.20% Native American, 0.85% Asian, and 1.54% from two or more races. 0.17% of the population were Hispanic or Latino of any race.

There were 230 households, out of which 30.4% had children under the age of 18 living with them, 61.3% were married couples living together, 5.2% had a female householder with no husband present, and 28.7% were non-families. 23.9% of all households were made up of individuals, and 13.5% had someone living alone who was 65 years of age or older. The average household size was 2.54 and the average family size was 3.06.

In the town the population was spread out, with 25.5% under the age of 18, 6.0% from 18 to 24, 29.1% from 25 to 44, 23.6% from 45 to 64, and 15.9% who were 65 years of age or older. The median age was 39 years. For every 100 females, there were 93.1 males. For every 100 females age 18 and over, there were 98.2 males.

The median income for a household in the town was $23,438, and the median income for a family was $28,500. Males had a median income of $28,523 versus $21,500 for females. The per capita income for the town was $13,206. About 22.6% of families and 34.1% of the population were below the poverty line, including 52.7% of those under age 18 and 32.1% of those age 65 or over.
