= Henry Nelson Pope =

American farmer's rights activist (1859–1956)

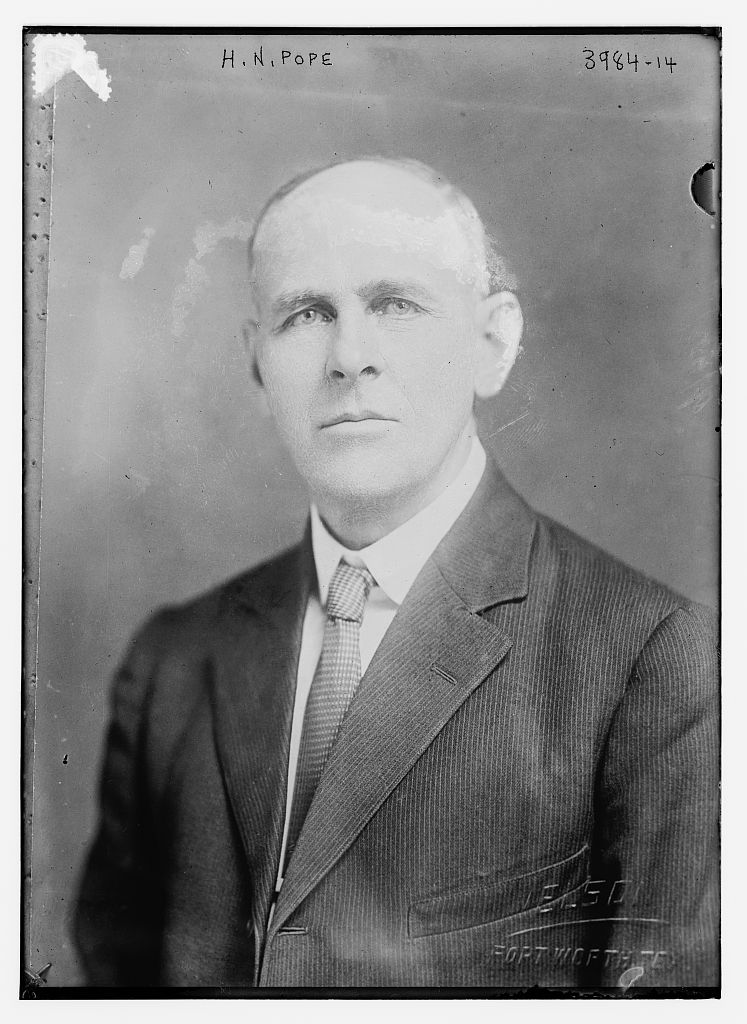
Pope in 1916

Henry Nelson Pope (April 23, 1859 – June 13, 1956) was an American farmer's rights activist. He was president of the Texas branch of the National Farmers Union.

He president of the Texas Farmers Union and president of the Association of State Presidents of the Farmers' Education and Cooperative Union of America, and president of the American Federation of Organized Producers and Consumers.

== Early life ==
Pope was born on April 23, 1859, in Mountainburg, Arkansas, to John Terrell Pope and Arrena (née Edwards) Pope. He was of English descent through his father. He grew up in poverty in rural Arkansas, moving to Texas with his mother in 1874. He lived in the Texas counties of Johnson and Palo Pinto, and in the settlements of Millsap and The Grove.

== Career ==
Pope served as justice of the peace for Millsap for four years, as sheriff of Parker county for four years in the 1900s, and as deputy sheriff of Johnson County.

Pope joined the National Farmers Union in the organization's early years. A strong orator, he championed small farmers and cooperatives. He helped established numerous local branches of the organization, such as ones in California and Oregon.

In October 1915, Pope was made president of the American Federation of Organized Producers and Consumers, and on November 5, was elected president of the Association of State Presidents of the Farmers' Education and Cooperative Union of America. He was also part of the Farmers' Education and Cooperative Union of America, being elected its general organizer in August 1913. He was also president of the Farmers Union Cotton Company.

In 1916, Pope testified before the United States Congress opposing the eight-hour workday for interstate railroads that was imposed by the Adamson Act. He criticized Congress for increasing the salaries of conductors while not increasing the salaries of those who lay rail.

== Personal life and death ==
Around 1878, Pope married Sarah Jane Cope; they had seven children together. Frank W. Johnson described Sarah Jane Cope as a "businesswoman" and independent for her time. He died on June 13, 1956, aged 97, in Fort Worth, Texas. He was buried in Rose Hill.
