= Alma, Arkansas =

- City
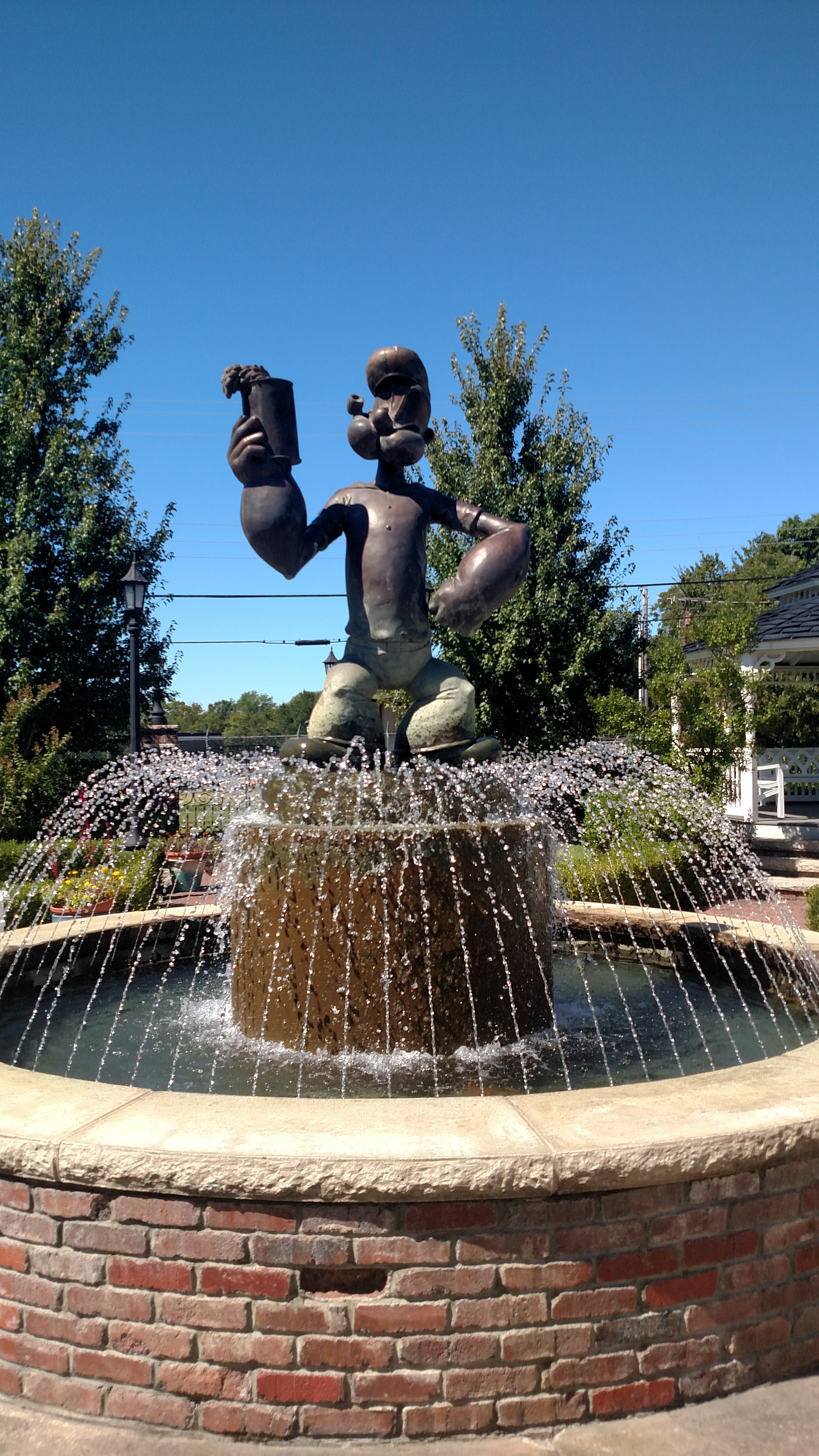
- Popeye downtown Alma
- Mottoes: Crossroads of America; Spinach Capital of the World
- Location of Alma in Crawford County, Arkansas.

- Location in Arkansas
- Coordinates: 35°29′31″N 94°13′00″W
- Country: United States
- State: Arkansas
- County: Crawford
- Incorporated: 1874

Area
  - Total: 5.90 sq mi (15.28 km^{2})
  - Land: 5.73 sq mi (14.84 km^{2})
  - Water: 0.17 sq mi (0.44 km^{2})
- Elevation: 466 ft (142 m)

Population (2020)
  - Total: 5,825
  - Estimate (2025): 6,071 ▲
  - Density: 1,016.5/sq mi (392.48/km^{2})
- Time zone: UTC−06:00 (CST)
  - Summer (DST): UTC−05:00 (CDT)
- ZIP Code: 72921
- Area code: 479
- FIPS code: 05-00970
- GNIS feature ID: 2403086
- Website: www.almaarkansas.gov

Alma is a city in Crawford County, in far western Arkansas, United States. It is located within the Arkansas River Valley at the edge of the Ozark Mountains; the city is the sixth largest in the Fort Smith metropolitan area. The population was 5,825 at the 2020 Census. Interstates 40 and 49 were constructed to intersect near the existing city.

== History ==
Alma was incorporated in 1874. Its economy was largely agricultural until the introduction of the canning industry. Today, the city claims the title of "Spinach Capital of the World".

In his book Washington Goes to War (1996), David Brinkley described Alma's participation in the World War II effort:

In the town of Alma, Arkansas (population 776), one-fourth of the girls in the 1944 high school graduating class signed up to leave for Washington, and several of their teachers cast aside their low-paying jobs and went with them, all of them climbing aboard a Pullman car for their first train ride, looking for more money and excitement than they had any reasonable expectation of finding in Alma.

Many people migrated from small towns to the capital seeking jobs as the government and associated businesses expanded to run the war effort.

== Geography ==
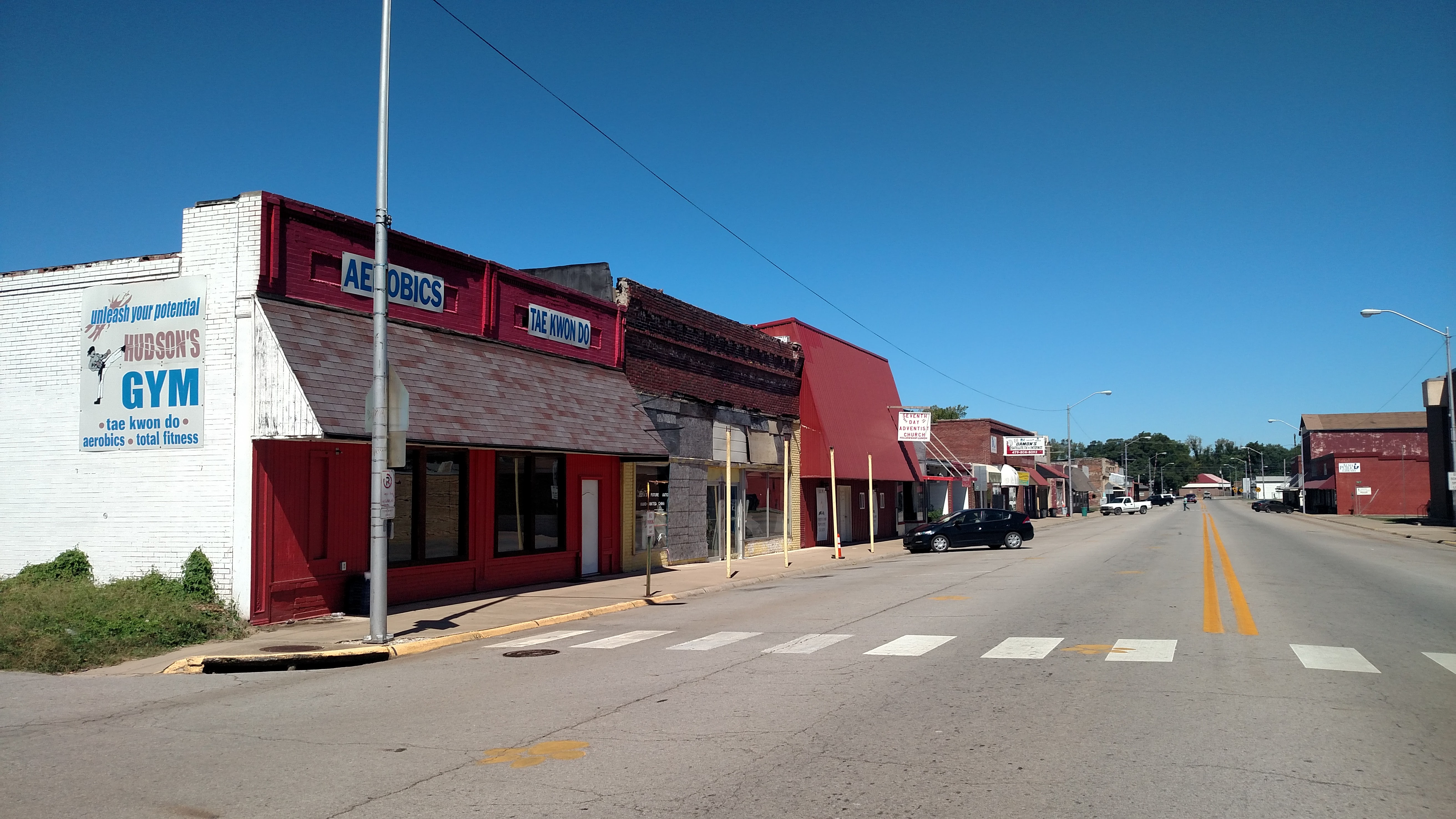
Streetside along Highway 162 in Alma, AR

According to the United States Census Bureau, the city has a total area of 5.6 square miles (14.4 km^{2}), of which 5.4 square miles (14.0 km^{2}) is land and 0.15 square miles (0.4 km^{2}), or 3.06%, is water.

Alma developed along the border between the Boston Mountains and the Arkansas River Valley. While most of the city lies on flat land, immediately to the north is scenic hill country. Alma is surrounded by several rural towns, including Rudy to the north, Dyer and Mulberry to the east, and Kibler to the southwest.

Alma is located in south-central Crawford County and has no airport. The train station, which fell into a state of dilapidation, was torn down in the early 1970's.

Much of its commerce derives from interstate highway traffic, as Interstates 40 and 49 (previously 540), as well as U.S. Routes 64 and 71, pass through the city.

=== Parks ===
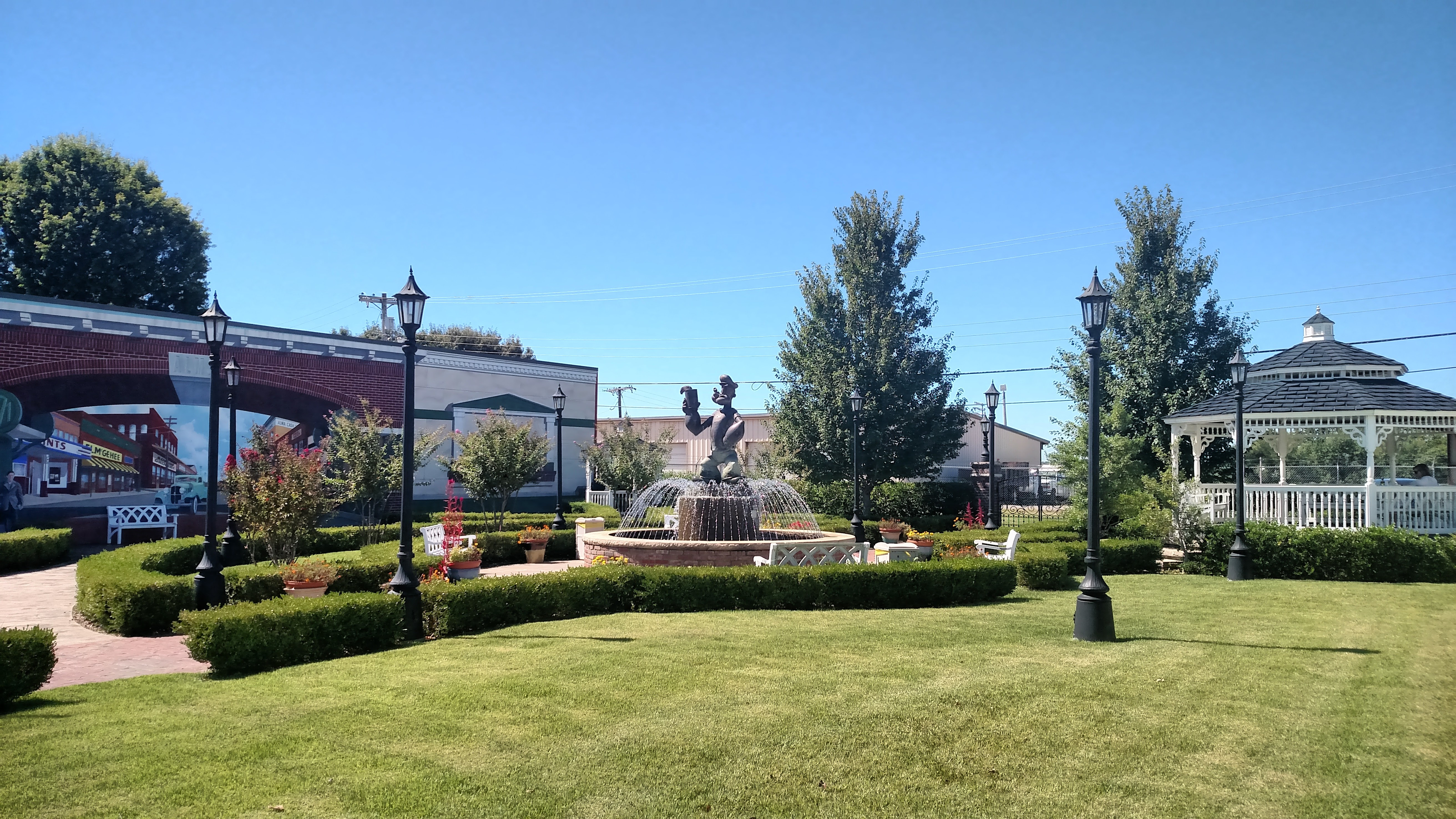
Popeye's Garden includes a gazebo and fountain

Lake Alma Park, surrounding the reservoir formed by a tall earthen dam that impounds Little Frog Bayou, is the largest park in Alma. It contains a 4.4 miles (7.1 km) bike trail loop and 18-hole disc golf course. Alma Aquatic Park, open Memorial Day to Labor Day, is below the dam and contains a large swimming area, diving boards, slides, and a wading pool.Joe and Freda Hawkins Memorial Walkway is located next to Alma Aquatic Park along Little Frog Bayou. Tony and Mardell Christello Park is 25 acres (10 ha) with flat, paved walking trail.

== Demographics ==
Historical population
| Census | Pop. | Note | %± |
|---|---|---|---|
| 1880 | 504 | | — |
| 1890 | 486 | | −3.6% |
| 1900 | 440 | | −9.5% |
| 1910 | 565 | | 28.4% |
| 1920 | 779 | | 37.9% |
| 1930 | 731 | | −6.2% |
| 1940 | 774 | | 5.9% |
| 1950 | 1,228 | | 58.7% |
| 1960 | 1,370 | | 11.6% |
| 1970 | 1,613 | | 17.7% |
| 1980 | 2,755 | | 70.8% |
| 1990 | 2,959 | | 7.4% |
| 2000 | 4,160 | | 40.6% |
| 2010 | 5,419 | | 30.3% |
| 2020 | 5,825 | | 7.5% |
| 2025 (est.) | 6,071 | ▲ | 4.2% |
U.S. Decennial Census; 2014 Estimate

=== 2020 census ===
Alma racial composition
| Race | Number | Percentage |
|---|---|---|
| White (non-Hispanic) | 4,826 | 82.85% |
| Black or African American (non-Hispanic) | 107 | 1.84% |
| Native American | 106 | 1.82% |
| Asian | 39 | 0.67% |
| Other/Mixed | 492 | 8.45% |
| Hispanic or Latino | 255 | 4.38% |

As of the 2020 census, Alma had a population of 5,825. The median age was 34.3 years. 29.1% of residents were under the age of 18 and 15.0% of residents were 65 years of age or older. For every 100 females there were 91.2 males, and for every 100 females age 18 and over there were 86.7 males age 18 and over.

94.5% of residents lived in urban areas, while 5.5% lived in rural areas.

There were 2,222 households in Alma, of which 38.4% had children under the age of 18 living in them. Of all households, 46.4% were married-couple households, 15.8% were households with a male householder and no spouse or partner present, and 30.9% were households with a female householder and no spouse or partner present. About 27.2% of all households were made up of individuals and 10.9% had someone living alone who was 65 years of age or older.

There were 2,416 housing units, of which 8.0% were vacant. The homeowner vacancy rate was 2.0% and the rental vacancy rate was 8.7%.

=== Demographic estimates ===
A Census Bureau estimate reported 1,539 families residing in the city, a population density of 1,016.2 people per square mile, and 7.0% of residents under age 5.

The median household income was $38,292, and the per capita income was $17,811. 32.3% of the population were under the poverty line.

=== 2000 census ===
As of the census of 2000, there were 4,160 people, 1,560 households, and 1,168 families residing in the city. The population density was 865.4 inhabitants per square mile (334.1/km^{2}). There were 1,688 housing units at an average density of 351.1 per square mile (135.6/km^{2}). The racial makeup of the city was 94.66% White, 1.71% Black or African American, 1.56% Native American, 0.10% Asian, 0.12% Pacific Islander, 0.75% from other races, and 1.11% from two or more races. Hispanic or Latino of any race were 3.70% of the population.

There were 1,560 households, out of which 42.8% had children under the age of 18 living with them, 56.1% were married couples living together, 14.7% had a female householder with no husband present, and 25.1% were non-families. 22.3% of all households were made up of individuals, and 10.5% had someone living alone who was 65 years of age or older. The average household size was 2.66 and the average family size was 3.11.

In the city, the age distribution was 32.1% under the age of 18, 9.6% from 18 to 24, 28.9% from 25 to 44, 18.6% from 45 to 64, and 10.8% who were 65 years of age or older. The median age was 31 years. For every 100 females, there were 90.2 males. For every 100 females age 18 and over, there were 85.4 males.

The median income for a household in the city was $28,906, and the median income for a family was $34,068. Males had a median income of $33,235 versus $17,014 for females. The per capita income for the city was $15,227. 11.9% of families and 16.3% of the population were below the poverty line, including 19.7% of those under the age of 18 and 25.4% of those ages 65 or older.

== Government ==
Alma operates under a form of local government where the mayor and city council combine to form the Governing Body. The city council is composed of six council members, with two elected from each of the city's three wards. Ward 1: Sandra Kilpatrick, Larry Blasingame. Ward 2: James McGhee, Evan Thacker. Ward 3: Damon Brown, Gary Perry. Council members serve two-year terms, and elections for all seats are held concurrently. The mayor serves a four-year term. The current mayor is Jim Fincher. The city also operates with a city clerk and a city attorney.

== Education ==
Public education for elementary and secondary school students is provided by the Alma School District. The four schools in the district include Alma Primary School, Alma Intermediate School, Alma Middle School and Alma High School.

== Arts and culture ==
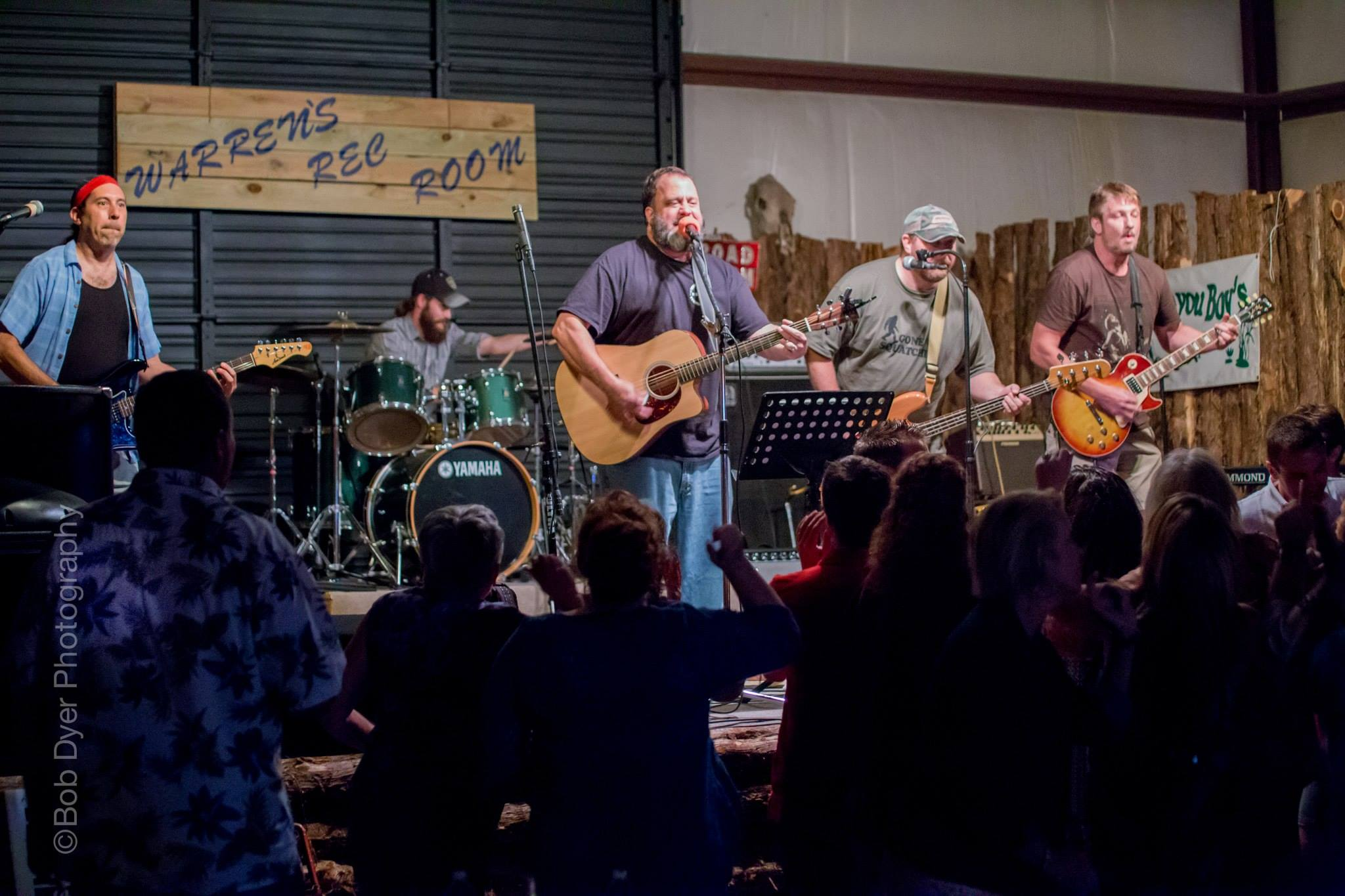
Live music performance at Warren's Rec Room in Alma

Concerts are held at the Skokos Performing Arts Center on Main Street.

=== Spinach Capital of the World ===
Around 1987, Alma called itself the "Spinach Capital of the World" because the Allen Canning Company based in Alma canned more than half of all the spinach canned in the U.S., about 60 million pounds (27,000,000 kg) annually. The town has had various statues of the cartoon character Popeye, because of his connection to canned spinach; the most recent one was erected in 2007. Cast in bronze, it sits atop a fountain holding a can of spinach. It is the centerpiece of Popeye Park. Crystal City Texas is also considered the Spinach Capital of the World.

=== Annual cultural events ===
The annual Spinach Festival is hosted at the City Park and Community Center on the third weekend in April. First held in 1986, the festival is sponsored by the Alma Chamber of Commerce and the Alma Advertising & Promotion Commission. The festival brings carnival rides, crafts, food and live music. A spinach eating contest takes place at noon, followed by a spinach drop. A package of spinach is dropped from an Alma Fire Department ladder truck onto a board with entrant's names, with the winner receiving a cash prize.

== Infrastructure ==
=== Water ===
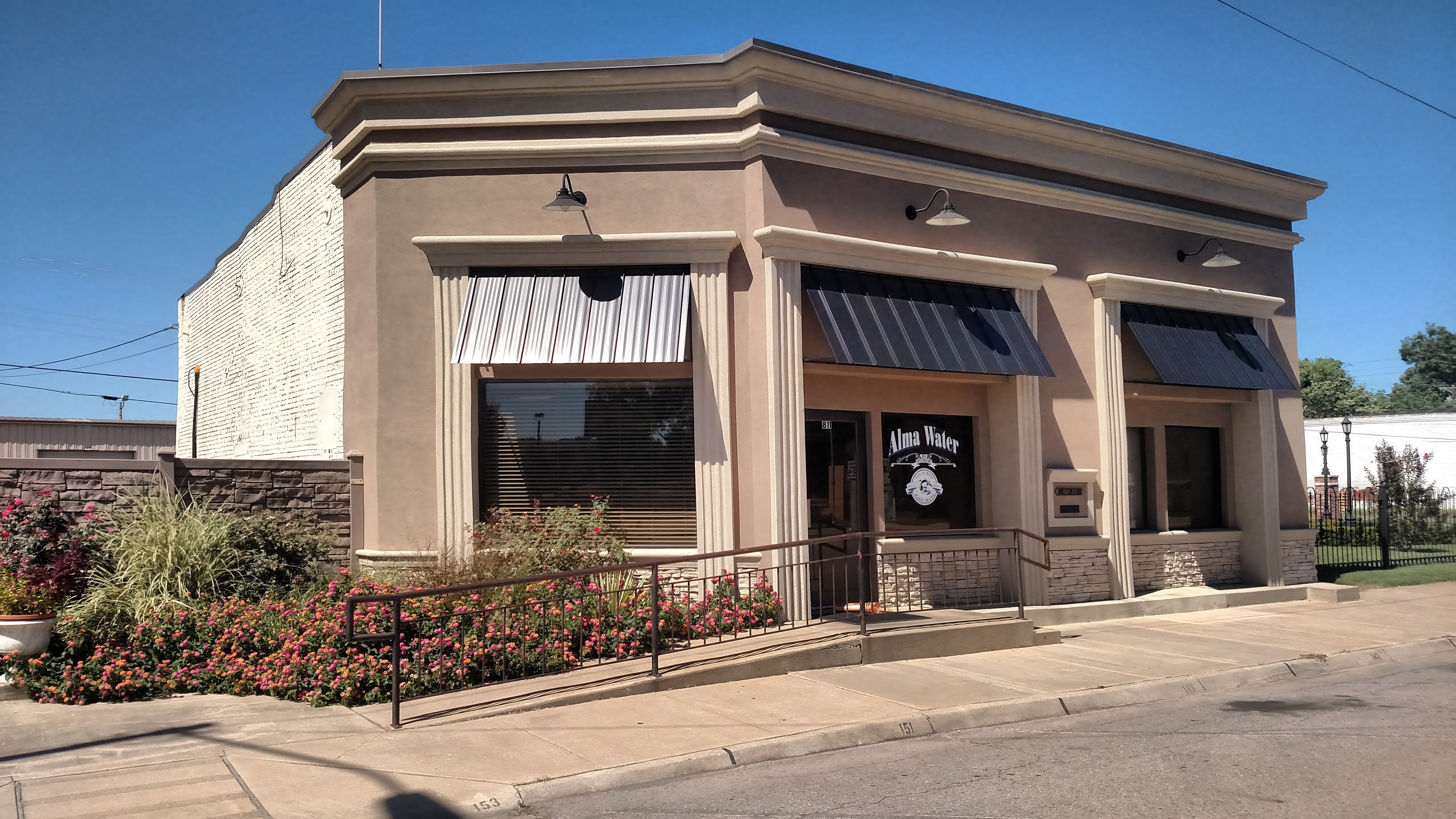
Alma Water & Sewer main office

The City of Alma Public Works Department contains the Water & Sewer Division. This group treats and distributes potable water from Lake Alma to the residents and commercial users of the city while also owning and operating a wastewater collection system.

Wastewater is collected and conveyed to the Alma Wastewater Treatment Plant (WWTP). At the WWTP, wastewater passes through a bar screen, Parshall Flume, lagoon 1 (one completely mixed cell followed by two partially mixed cells), Lagoon 2 (facultative), Lagoon 3 (facultative), and optional chlorine/de-chlorination chambers. The plant has a design capacity of 1.75 million US gallons (6,600,000 L) per day, and discharges treated effluent to the Arkansas River in accordance with the city's NPDES permit administrated by the Arkansas Department of Environmental Quality.

== Notable people ==
- Kiley Dean, R&B singer
- Eli Drinkwitz, University of Missouri football coach
- Charlene Fite, Republican member of the Arkansas House of Representatives from District 80; formerly resided in Alma
- Bradley Hathaway, poet and folk musician
- Billy Hughes, actor
- Morgan Nick, child abduction/murder victim
- Parley Pratt, early leader of the Latter Day Saint movement
- Fay Washington, baseball player
- Gavin Webb, Filmmaker and Paranormal Investigator
