= Rudy, Arkansas =

- Town
- Location of Rudy in Crawford County, Arkansas.
- Coordinates: 35°31′30″N 94°15′44″W
- Country: United States
- State: Arkansas
- County: Crawford

Area
  - Total: 1.59 sq mi (4.12 km^{2})
  - Land: 1.59 sq mi (4.11 km^{2})
  - Water: 0.0039 sq mi (0.01 km^{2})
- Elevation: 784 ft (239 m)

Population (2020)
  - Total: 130
  - Estimate (2025): 131 ▲
  - Density: 81.9/sq mi (31.63/km^{2})
- Time zone: UTC-6 (Central (CST))
  - Summer (DST): UTC-5 (CDT)
- ZIP code: 72952
- Area code: 479
- FIPS code: 05-61460
- GNIS feature ID: 2407256

Rudy is a town in Crawford County, Arkansas, United States. It is part of the Fort Smith, Arkansas-Oklahoma Metropolitan Statistical Area. As of the 2020 Census the population was 130. The population was 72 at the 2000 census.

== History ==
Rudy was platted when the St. Louis–San Francisco Railway was extended to that point. A post office called Rudy has been in operation since 1883.

== Geography ==
According to the United States Census Bureau, the town has a total area of 0.062 square miles (0.16 km^{2}), all land.

== Demographics ==
Historical population
Census	Pop.	Note	%±
1940	89		—
1950	97		9.0%
1960	113		16.5%
1970	103		−8.8%
1980	79		−23.3%
1990	45		−43.0%
2000	72		60.0%
2010	61		−15.3%
2020	130		113.1%
2025 (est.)	131	▲	0.8%
U.S. Decennial Census

As of the 2020 United States census there were 130 people, 58 housing units, and 59 families residing in the town. The population density was 463.3/km^{2} (1,251.4/mi^{2}). There were 30 housing units at an average density of 193.1/km^{2} (521.4/mi^{2}). The racial makeup of the town was 90% White and 0.7% Native American. 1.39% of the population were Hispanic or Latino of any race, and 2.3% were Asian.

As of the 2010 census, there were 58 households, out of which 37.0% had children under the age of 18 living with them, 63.0% were married couples living together, 11.1% had a female householder with no husband present, and 18.5% were non-families. 14.8% of all households were made up of individuals, and 14.8% had someone living alone who was 65 years of age or older. The average household size was 2.67 and the average family size was 2.86.

In the town, the population was spread out, with 30.6% under the age of 18, 5.6% from 18 to 24, 26.4% from 25 to 44, 12.5% from 45 to 64, and 25.0% who were 65 years of age or older. The median age was 38 years. For every 100 females, there were 94.6 males. For every 100 females age 18 and over, there were 100.0 males.

The median income for a household in the town was $21,875, and the median income for a family was $26,250. Males had a median income of $21,250 versus $13,750 for females. The per capita income for the town was $11,842. There were 20.0% of families and 19.2% of the population living below the poverty line, including 16.7% of under eighteens and 25.0% of those over 64.
