= Crawford County, Arkansas =

County in Arkansas, United States

- County
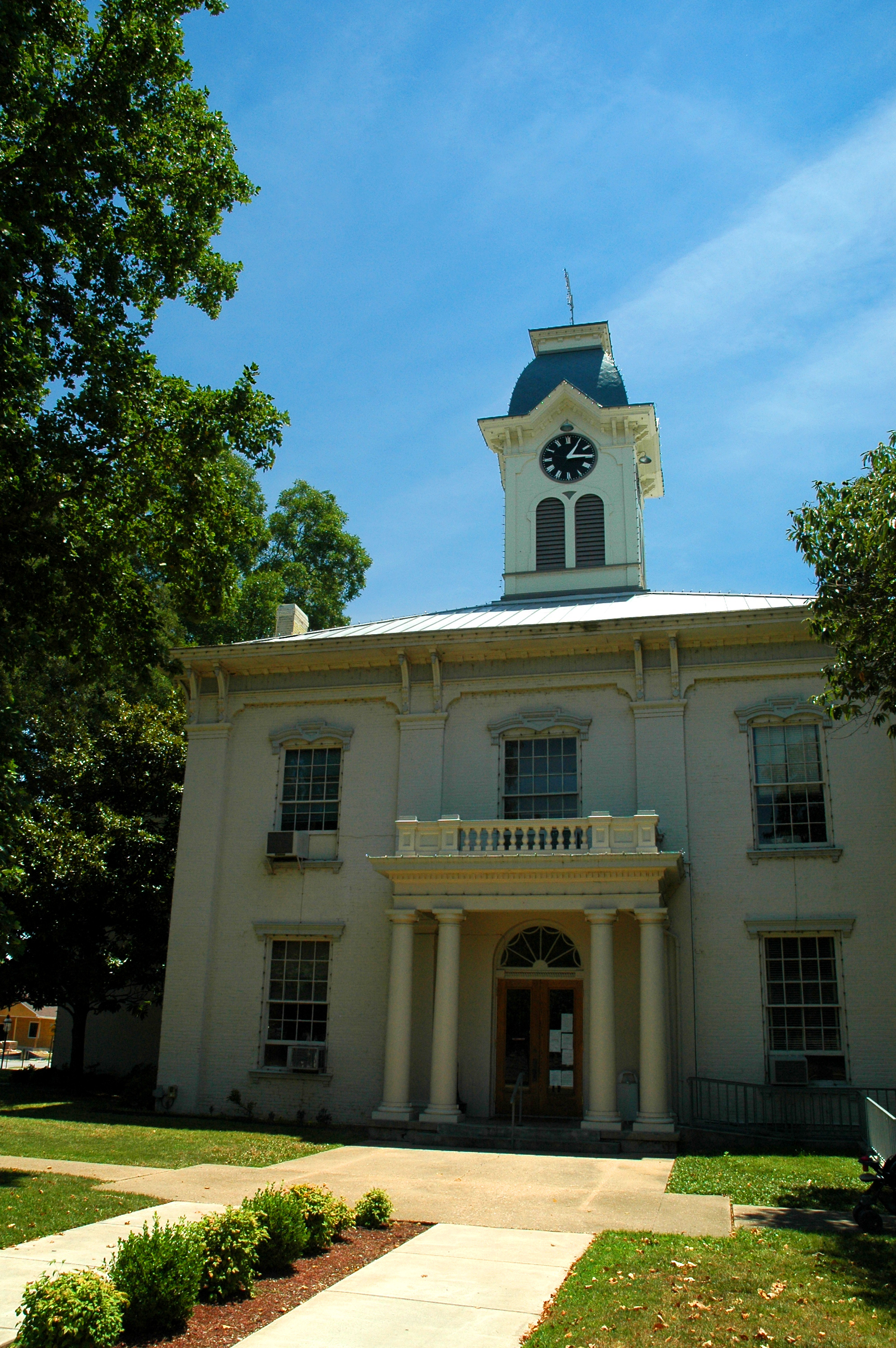
- Crawford County Courthouse within the Van Buren Historic District

- Location within the U.S. state of Arkansas
- Coordinates: 35°34′00″N 94°15′00″W
- Country: United States
- State: Arkansas
- Named for: William H. Crawford
- Seat: Van Buren
- Largest city: Van Buren

Area
  - Total: 604 sq mi (1,560 km^{2})
  - Land: 593 sq mi (1,540 km^{2})
  - Water: 11 sq mi (28 km^{2}) 1.8%

Population (2020)
  - Total: 60,133
  - Estimate (2025): 62,657 ▲
  - Density: 101/sq mi (39.2/km^{2})
- Time zone: UTC−6 (Central)
  - Summer (DST): UTC−5 (CDT)
- Congressional district: 3rd
- Website: www.crawfordcountyar.gov

Crawford County is a county located in the Ozarks region of the U.S. state of Arkansas. As of the 2020 census, its population was 60,133. The county seat and largest city is Van Buren. Crawford County was formed on October 18, 1820, from the former Lovely County and Indian Territory, and was named for William H. Crawford, the United States Secretary of War in 1815.

Located largely within the Ozarks, the county's southern border follows the Arkansas River, placing its southernmost edge in the Arkansas River Valley. The frontier county became an early crossroads, beginning with a California Gold Rush and developing into the Butterfield Overland Mail, Civil War trails, and railroads such as the St. Louis and San Francisco Railway, the Little Rock and Fort Smith Railroad, and the St. Louis, Iron Mountain and Southern Railway. Today, the county is home to the intersection of two major interstate highways, Interstate 40 (I-40) and I-49. Crawford County is part of the Fort Smith metropolitan area. As a dry county, alcohol sales are generally prohibited, though recent changes to county law provide for exemptions.

== Geography ==
Crawford County is located in northwest Arkansas. According to the U.S. Census Bureau, the county has a total area of 604 square miles (1,560 km^{2}), of which 11 square miles (28 km^{2}) (1.8%) are covered by water.

=== Major highways ===
- Interstate 40
  - Interstate 540
- Interstate 49
- US 64
- US 71
- Highway 59
- Highway 60
- Highway 162
- Highway 215
- Highway 220
- Highway 282
- Highway 348
- Highway 400

In April, 2014, I-540 through Crawford County was redesignated as I-49. As of September 2021, I-49 is a continuous stretch of Interstate from Alma, Arkansas, to Kansas City, Missouri. While the northern half is fully complete, the ultimate goal for I-49 is to create a seamless border-to-border route from New Orleans, Louisiana, to Kansas City. The remaining gaps are the segments currently under development south of I-40 through the Arkansas Ouachita Mountains down to Texarkana.

=== Transit ===
- Jefferson Lines

=== Adjacent counties ===
- Washington County (north)
- Madison County (northeast)
- Franklin County (east)
- Sebastian County (south)
- Le Flore County, Oklahoma (southwest)
- Sequoyah County, Oklahoma (west)
- Adair County, Oklahoma (northwest)

=== Protected areas ===
- Lake Fort Smith State Park
- Ozark National Forest (part)
- White Rock Wildlife Management Area (part)

== Demographics ==
Historical population
Census	Pop.	Note	%±
1830	2,440		—
1840	4,266		74.8%
1850	7,960		86.6%
1860	7,850		−1.4%
1870	8,957		14.1%
1880	14,740		64.6%
1890	21,714		47.3%
1900	21,270		−2.0%
1910	23,942		12.6%
1920	25,739		7.5%
1930	22,549		−12.4%
1940	23,920		6.1%
1950	22,727		−5.0%
1960	21,318		−6.2%
1970	25,677		20.4%
1980	36,892		43.7%
1990	42,493		15.2%
2000	53,247		25.3%
2010	61,948		16.3%
2020	60,133		−2.9%
2025 (est.)	62,657	▲	4.2%
U.S. Decennial Census; 1790–1960 1900–1990; 1990–2000 2010

=== 2020 census ===
Racial and ethnic composition, 2020
Race / ethnicity	Percentage
White	80.8%
Black or African American	1.5%
American Indian and Alaska Native	2.5%
Asian	1.6%
Native Hawaiian and Pacific Islander	0.1%
Some other race	3.9%
Two or more races	9.7%
Hispanic or Latino (of any race)	7.6%

As of the 2020 census, the county had a population of 60,133. The median age was 39.9 years. 24.5% of residents were under the age of 18 and 17.6% were 65 years of age or older. For every 100 females there were 95.9 males, and for every 100 females age 18 and over there were 93.8 males age 18 and over.

50.6% of residents lived in urban areas, while 49.4% lived in rural areas.

There were 22,986 households in the county, of which 32.8% had children under the age of 18 living in them. Of all households, 52.0% were married-couple households, 16.8% were households with a male householder and no spouse or partner present, and 24.8% were households with a female householder and no spouse or partner present. About 24.7% of all households were made up of individuals and 11.4% had someone living alone who was 65 years of age or older.

There were 25,300 housing units, of which 9.1% were vacant. Among occupied housing units, 71.2% were owner-occupied and 28.8% were renter-occupied. The homeowner vacancy rate was 1.4% and the rental vacancy rate was 9.7%.

=== 2000 census ===
As of the 2000 census, there were 53,247 people, 19,702 households, and 15,150 families residing in the county. The population density was 35/km^{2} (91/mi^{2}). The 21,315 housing units had an average density of 14/km^{2} (36/mi^{2}). The racial makeup of the county was 92.19% White, 0.87% Black or African American, 2.01% Native American, 1.19% Asian, 0.02% Pacific Islander, 1.48% from other races, and 2.24% from two or more races. About 3.27% of the population were Hispanics or Latinos of any race.

Of the 19,702 households, 37.5% had children under 18 living with them, 62.2% were married couples living together, 10.9% had a female householder with no husband present, and 23.1% were not families. About 20.0% of all households were made up of individuals, and 8.2% had someone living alone who was 65 or older. The average household size was 2.68 and the average family size was 3.07.

In the county, the age distribution was 28.2% under 18, 8.4% from 18 to 24, 29.3% from 25 to 44, 22.8% from 45 to 64, and 11.3% who were 65 or older. The median age was 35 years. For every 100 females, there were 97.7 males. For every 100 females 18 and over, there were 94.2 males.

The median income for a household in the county was $32,871, and for a family was $36,741. Males had a median income of $29,581 versus $20,352 for females. The per capita income for the county was $15,015. About 10.9% of families and 14.2% of the population were below the poverty line, including 19.3% of those under 18 and 13.70% of those 65 or over.

== Controversy ==
Thousands of self-claimed "Western Band of Cherokee" (or Arkansas Cherokees) failed to obtain state and federal recognition as a political entity of Native Americans. Crawford County (specifically, that area known as "Lovely's Purchase") was historically part of the Cherokee Nation, which lost its tribal sovereignty status as a result of the U.S. Civil War in the 1860s. The Cherokee Nation was subsequently relocated to the west in the present-day state of Oklahoma.

The violent arrest of Randal Worcester by two Crawford County sheriff's deputies and one Mulberry police officer took place in Mulberry, Crawford County, in August 2022.

== Government ==
=== Government ===
The county government is a constitutional body granted specific powers by the Constitution of Arkansas and the Arkansas Code. The quorum court is the legislative branch of the county government and controls all spending and revenue collection. Representatives are called justices of the peace and are elected from county districts every even-numbered year. The number of districts in a county vary from nine to fifteen, and district boundaries are drawn by the county election commission. The Crawford County Quorum Court has thirteen members. Presiding over quorum court meetings is the county judge, who serves as the chief operating officer of the county. The county judge is elected at-large and does not vote in quorum court business, although capable of vetoing quorum court decisions.

Crawford County, Arkansas Elected countywide officials
Position	Officeholder	Party
County Judge	Chris Keith	Republican
County Clerk	Stacey Shelly	Republican
Circuit Clerk	Sharon Blount-Baker	Republican
Sheriff	Daniel Perry	Republican
Treasurer	Daniel Watson	Republican
Collector	Kevin Pixley	Republican
Assessor	Sandra Heiner	Republican
Coroner	Pam Wells	Republican
Surveyor	Vacant	

The composition of the Quorum Court following the 2024 elections is 13 Republicans. Justices of the Peace (members) of the Quorum Court following the elections are:

- District 1: Robert Arnold (R) of Rudy
- District 2: Lonnie Myers (R) of Van Buren
- District 3: Morgan R. Morgan (R) of Van Buren
- District 4: Lloyd Cole (R) of Van Buren
- District 5: Brad Martin (R) of Van Buren
- District 6: Mark Shaffer (R) of Van Buren
- District 7: Kyle Stinchcomb (R) of Van Buren
- District 8: Tia Woodruff (R) of Alma
- District 9: Jason Cox (R) of Van Buren
- District 10: Jayson Peppas (R) of Alma
- District 11: Kevin Bell (R) of Alma
- District 12: Donna Staton (R) of Dyer
- District 13: Steven Johnson (R) of Mountainburg

Additionally, the townships of Crawford County are entitled to elect their own respective constables, as set forth by the Constitution of Arkansas. Constables are largely of historical significance as they were used to keep the peace in rural areas when travel was more difficult. The township constables as of the 2024 elections are:

- District 1: Keith Coatney (R)
- District 2: Tom Fite (R)
- District 3: Chase Hall DeCroo (R)
- District 4: Shyla Tuck (R)
- District 5: Joshua Baker (R)
- District 8: Randy Beck (R)
- District 9: Tommy Buckner (R)
- District 10: Shawn Shelton (R)
- District 11: Dennis P. Shore (R)
- District 12: Christian Martin (R)
- District 13: John Parette (R)

=== Politics ===
Crawford County is a longtime Republican stronghold, so much so that not even former governor and native Arkansan Bill Clinton was able to carry it in either of his presidential victories. The last Democrat (as of 2024) to carry this county was Jimmy Carter in 1976.

United States presidential election results for Crawford County, Arkansas
Year	Republican		Democratic		Third party(ies)	
Year	No.	%	No.	%	No.	%
1836	119	52.19%	109	47.81%	0	0.00%
1840	335	49.12%	347	50.88%	0	0.00%
1844	385	40.53%	565	59.47%	0	0.00%
1848	345	43.02%	457	56.98%	0	0.00%
1852	153	39.33%	236	60.67%	0	0.00%
1856	0	0.00%	371	69.74%	161	30.26%
1860	0	0.00%	357	36.62%	618	63.38%
1868	486	55.42%	391	44.58%	0	0.00%
1872	918	60.92%	589	39.08%	0	0.00%
1876	663	40.93%	957	59.07%	0	0.00%
1880	974	45.09%	1,138	52.69%	48	2.22%
1884	1,193	45.34%	1,438	54.66%	0	0.00%
1888	1,680	46.28%	1,913	52.70%	37	1.02%
1892	1,099	36.73%	1,545	51.64%	348	11.63%
1896	1,311	40.98%	1,870	58.46%	18	0.56%
1900	1,060	41.78%	1,449	57.11%	28	1.10%
1904	941	49.97%	875	46.47%	67	3.56%
1908	1,339	43.49%	1,661	53.95%	79	2.57%
1912	407	21.65%	969	51.54%	504	26.81%
1916	1,195	42.42%	1,622	57.58%	0	0.00%
1920	1,497	44.06%	1,861	54.77%	40	1.18%
1924	996	34.23%	1,445	49.66%	469	16.12%
1928	1,559	47.21%	1,743	52.79%	0	0.00%
1932	809	21.16%	2,962	77.46%	53	1.39%
1936	697	26.09%	1,963	73.47%	12	0.45%
1940	691	29.81%	1,581	68.21%	46	1.98%
1944	1,141	39.87%	1,702	59.47%	19	0.66%
1948	1,002	33.94%	1,730	58.60%	220	7.45%
1952	2,782	52.80%	2,477	47.01%	10	0.19%
1956	3,090	52.88%	2,723	46.60%	30	0.51%
1960	3,373	57.10%	2,430	41.14%	104	1.76%
1964	3,294	48.07%	3,537	51.62%	21	0.31%
1968	2,723	37.73%	1,578	21.86%	2,917	40.41%
1972	6,974	81.41%	1,520	17.74%	72	0.84%
1976	4,764	44.48%	5,946	55.52%	0	0.00%
1980	8,542	66.22%	3,948	30.61%	409	3.17%
1984	9,551	75.20%	3,071	24.18%	79	0.62%
1988	9,092	70.85%	3,582	27.91%	158	1.23%
1992	6,882	42.57%	6,656	41.18%	2,627	16.25%
1996	7,182	45.42%	6,749	42.68%	1,883	11.91%
2000	10,804	61.30%	6,288	35.68%	533	3.02%
2004	13,391	65.64%	6,764	33.16%	246	1.21%
2008	14,688	71.54%	5,238	25.51%	606	2.95%
2012	15,145	73.55%	4,881	23.70%	565	2.74%
2016	16,686	74.33%	4,488	19.99%	1,276	5.68%
2020	18,607	77.24%	4,959	20.58%	525	2.18%
2024	18,615	78.10%	4,753	19.94%	466	1.96%

== Communities ==
=== Cities ===
- Alma
- Cedarville
- Dyer
- Kibler
- Mountainburg
- Mulberry
- Van Buren (county seat)

=== Towns ===
- Chester
- Rudy

=== Census-designated places ===
- Dora
- Uniontown

=== Unincorporated community ===
- Natural Dam

=== Townships ===
Townships in Arkansas are the divisions of a county. Each township includes unincorporated areas; some may have incorporated cities or towns within part of their boundaries. Arkansas townships have limited purposes in modern times. However, the United States census does list Arkansas population based on townships (sometimes referred to as "county subdivisions" or "minor civil divisions"). Townships are also of value for historical purposes in terms of genealogical research. Each town or city is within one or more townships in an Arkansas county based on census maps and publications. The townships of Crawford County are listed below; listed in parentheses are the cities, towns, and/or census-designated places that are fully or partially inside the township.

- Alma (most of Alma)
- Bidville
- Cedar Creek
- Cedarville (Cedarville)
- Chester (Chester, small part of Mountainburg)
- Cove City
- Dean Springs (small part of Alma)
- Dora (part of Van Buren)
- Dyer (Dyer, small part of Alma)
- Jasper
- Kibler (most of Kibler)
- Lancaster
- Lees Creek
- Locke
- Mountainburg (most of Mountainburg)
- Mulberry (most of Mulberry)
- Oliver Springs
- Porter
- Rudy (Rudy, very small part of Alma)
- Uniontown
- Upper
- Van Buren (most of Van Buren, part of Kibler)
- Vine Prairie (part of Mulberry)
- Whitley
- Winfrey

== See also ==
- List of lakes in Crawford County, Arkansas
- National Register of Historic Places listings in Crawford County, Arkansas
