= National Register of Historic Places listings in Crawford County, Arkansas =

Location of Crawford County in Arkansas

This is a list of the National Register of Historic Places listings in Crawford County, Arkansas.

This is intended to be a complete list of the properties and districts on the National Register of Historic Places in Crawford County, Arkansas, United States. The locations of National Register properties and districts for which the latitude and longitude coordinates are included below, may be seen in a map.

There are 33 properties and districts listed on the National Register in the county. Another seven properties were once listed but have been removed.

Contents: Counties in Arkansas
- Arkansas
- Ashley
- Baxter
- Benton
- Boone
- Bradley
- Calhoun
- Carroll
- Chicot
- Clark
- Clay
- Cleburne
- Cleveland
- Columbia
- Conway
- Craighead
- Crawford
- Crittenden
- Cross
- Dallas
- Desha
- Drew
- Faulkner
- Franklin
- Fulton
- Garland
- Grant
- Greene
- Hempstead
- Hot Spring
- Howard
- Independence
- Izard
- Jackson
- Jefferson
- Johnson
- Lafayette
- Lawrence
- Lee
- Lincoln
- Little River
- Logan
- Lonoke
- Madison
- Marion
- Miller
- Mississippi
- Monroe
- Montgomery
- Nevada
- Newton
- Ouachita
- Perry
- Phillips
- Pike
- Poinsett
- Polk
- Pope
- Prairie
- Pulaski (Little Rock)
- Randolph
- St. Francis
- Saline
- Scott
- Searcy
- Sebastian
- Sevier
- Sharp
- Stone
- Union
- Van Buren
- Washington
- White
- Woodruff
- Yell

This National Park Service list is complete through NPS recent listings posted July 10, 2026.

== Current listings ==
	Name on the Register	Image	Date listed	Location	City or town	Description
1	Dr. Charles Fox Brown House	Dr. Charles Fox Brown House	September 6, 1978 (#78000583)	420 Drennan St. 35°25′58″N 94°21′00″W	Van Buren	
2	Bryan House	Bryan House	January 9, 1978 (#78000584)	105 Fayetteville St. 35°26′17″N 94°21′09″W	Van Buren	
3	Bryant-Lasater House	Bryant-Lasater House	September 19, 2007 (#07000958)	770 N. Main St. 35°30′28″N 94°03′05″W	Mulberry	
4	Bob Burns House	Bob Burns House	April 30, 1976 (#76000399)	821 Jefferson St. 35°26′09″N 94°21′02″W	Van Buren	
5	Butterfield Overland Mail Route Lee Creek Road Segment	Butterfield Overland Mail Route Lee Creek Road Segment	September 29, 2009 (#09000770)	Lee Creek Rd., west of Highway 220; 35°40′20″N 94°20′53″W	Cedarville	
6	Butterfield Overland Mail Route Lucian Wood Road Segment	Butterfield Overland Mail Route Lucian Wood Road Segment	September 29, 2009 (#09000771)	Lucian Wood Rd. between the junction of Armer La. and Cedarville Rd. and Highway 220; 35°34′19″N 94°21′55″W	Cedarville	
7	Butterfield Overland Mail Route Segment	Butterfield Overland Mail Route Segment	June 9, 2010 (#10000347)	Bugscuffle Rd. south of Strickler and Old Cove City Rd. north of Chester; 35°47′22″N 94°20′21″W	Strickler	Segment of the Butterfield Overland Mail route; extends into Washington County
8	Cedarville School Building	Cedarville School Building	September 10, 1992 (#92001217)	639 Pirates Way; 35°34′20″N 94°21′59″W	Cedarville	
9	Chester Masonic Lodge and Community Building	Chester Masonic Lodge and Community Building	March 3, 2000 (#00000150)	Junction of Front and Dickson Sts. 35°40′51″N 94°10′34″W	Chester	
10	Clarke-Harrell-Burson House	Clarke-Harrell-Burson House	May 14, 1991 (#91000582)	603 Parkview; 35°26′53″N 94°21′14″W	Van Buren	
11	Drennen-Scott House	Drennen-Scott House	September 10, 1971 (#71000123)	Drennen Reserve, N. 3rd St. 35°26′10″N 94°21′34″W	Van Buren	A Trail of Tears site
12	Joseph Starr Dunham House		May 3, 1976 (#76000400)	418 Broadway; 35°25′59″N 94°21′06″W	Van Buren	
13	Fairview Cemetery	Fairview Cemetery	June 1, 2005 (#05000489)	Bounded by Highway 59, McKibben Ave., and Poplar St. 35°26′35″N 94°21′04″W	Van Buren	
14	Fairview Cemetery, Confederate Section	Fairview Cemetery, Confederate Section	December 6, 1996 (#96001407)	Southwest of the junction of McKibben and 10th Sts. 35°26′31″N 94°20′58″W	Van Buren	
15	Frog Bayou Bridge	Frog Bayou Bridge	May 26, 1995 (#95000648)	Highway 282 over Frog Bayou; 35°37′04″N 94°11′03″W	Mountainburg	
16	High Rock Petroglyph Shelter		May 4, 1982 (#82002111)	Address Restricted	Rudy	
17	Lee Creek Bridge	Lee Creek Bridge	January 21, 2010 (#09001241)	West of W. Rena Rd. over Lee Creek; 35°27′53″N 94°23′21″W	Van Buren	
18	Mount Olive United Methodist Church	Mount Olive United Methodist Church	July 30, 1976 (#76000401)	Lafayette and Knox Sts. 35°26′13″N 94°21′18″W	Van Buren	
19	Mulberry Home Economics Building	Mulberry Home Economics Building	September 10, 1992 (#92001218)	Behind Mulberry High School, off Alma Ave. 35°29′59″N 94°03′21″W	Mulberry	
20	Muxen Building	Muxen Building	May 29, 2019 (#100003986)	22733 N. US 71; 35°45′39″N 94°06′57″W	Mountainburg	
21	No. 12 School	No. 12 School	January 4, 1996 (#95001481)	East of County Road 402, approximately 6 miles west of Chester; 35°42′13″N 94°15′13″W	Chester	
22	Old School Presbyterian Church	Old School Presbyterian Church	September 23, 2009 (#09000740)	421 Webster St. 35°26′03″N 94°21′17″W	Van Buren	
23	Old U.S. 64-Van Buren Segment	Old U.S. 64-Van Buren Segment	January 21, 2010 (#09001242)	Oak Ln. north of U.S. Route 64; 35°26′38″N 94°19′41″W	Van Buren	
24	Our Lady of the Ozarks Shrine	Our Lady of the Ozarks Shrine	May 29, 2019 (#100003993)	22741 US 71; 35°45′41″N 94°06′57″W	Winslow vicinity	
25	Henry "Harry" Charles Pernot House	Henry "Harry" Charles Pernot House	September 21, 2017 (#100001646)	119 Fayetteville Rd. 35°26′20″N 94°21′09″W	Van Buren	
26	Slack-Comstock-Marshall Farm	Slack-Comstock-Marshall Farm	June 9, 1995 (#95000694)	North of Highway 220, W. 35°35′21″N 94°27′07″W	Uniontown	
27	Van Buren Confederate Monument	Van Buren Confederate Monument	April 26, 1996 (#96000461)	Courthouse Lawn at the junction of 3rd and Main Sts. 35°26′02″N 94°21′19″W	Van Buren	
28	Van Buren Historic District	Van Buren Historic District	April 30, 1976 (#76000402)	Main St., bounded by Cane Hill St. and the Arkansas River; also Main Street. roughly from the RR track to the RR Depot on the north side of Main and from Third St to 826 Main St. on the south side 35°26′04″N 94°21′15″W	Van Buren	A boundary decrease was approved July 16, 2026.
29	Van Buren Overpass		May 18, 2023 (#100008980)	Jefferson St. between 4th St. and Riverfront Rd. 35°25′56″N 94°21′21″W	Van Buren	
30	Van Buren Post Office	Van Buren Post Office	August 14, 1998 (#98000918)	22 S. 7th St. 35°26′08″N 94°20′58″W	Van Buren	
31	Wilhauf House	Wilhauf House	August 27, 1974 (#74000473)	109 N. 3rd St. 35°26′05″N 94°21′28″W	Van Buren	
32	Wing School		February 23, 2023 (#100008655)	15312 AR 59; 35°39′36″N 94°24′08″W	Natural Dam	
33	Col. Jacob Yoes Building	Col. Jacob Yoes Building	June 5, 1975 (#75000380)	Front St. 35°40′44″N 94°10′27″W	Chester	

== Former listing ==
	Name on the Register	Image	Date listed	Date removed	Location	City or town	Description
1	Cedar Creek Bridge		May 10, 1995 (#95000649)	September 24, 2004	AR 348 over Cedar Creek	Rudy vicinity	
2	Crawford County Road 32D Bridge		May 10, 1995 (#95000650)	September 24, 2004	County Road 32D over Cove Creek	Natural Dam vicinity	
3	Lee Creek Bridge		April 6, 1990 (#90000504)	September 24, 2004	AR 220	Cove City vicinity	
4	Lee Creek Bridge	Lee Creek Bridge	April 6, 1990 (#90000508)	January 24, 2019	Highway 59 over Lee Creek; 35°38′46″N 94°23′37″W	Natural Dam	Demolished in 2018
5	Henry Clay Mills House		December 16, 1977 (#77000250)	January 26, 2018	425 N. 15th St. 35°26′30″N 94°20′33″W	Van Buren	
6	Mountainburg High School		September 10, 1992 (#92001216)	October 19, 2001	US 71	Mountainburg	Removed due to significant alteration of the building.
7	Mulberry River Bridge	Mulberry River Bridge	January 24, 2007 (#06001272)	April 30, 2024	County Road 67; 35°31′57″N 94°02′27″W	Pleasant Hill	Extends into Franklin County

== See also ==
- List of National Historic Landmarks in Arkansas
- National Register of Historic Places listings in Arkansas
