= Chester Masonic Lodge and Community Building =

- U.S. National Register of Historic Places
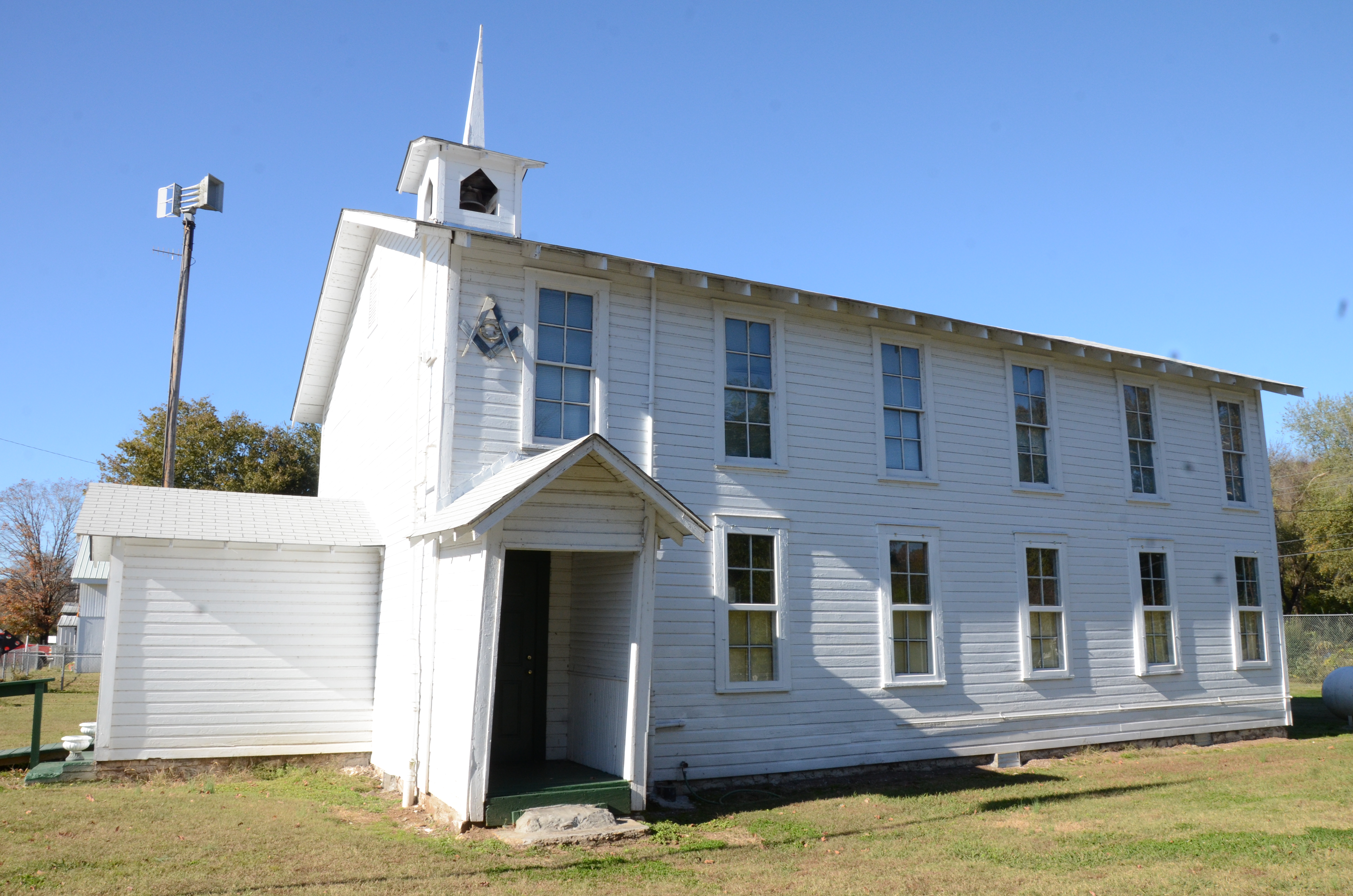

- Location within Arkansas Location within the United States
- Location: Jct. of Front and Dickson Sts., Chester, Arkansas
- Coordinates: 35°40′51″N 94°10′34″W
- Area: 0.9 acres (0.36 ha)
- Built: 1942
- Architect: Emory Seratt
- Architectural style: Plain traditional
- NRHP reference No.: 00000150
- Added to NRHP: March 3, 2000

The Chester Masonic Lodge and Community Building is a historic community building in Chester, Arkansas. It is a two-story rectangular wood-frame structure, designed to house a church and community space on the ground floor, and Masonic lodge facilities on the upper floor. It was built in 1942, replacing a 1903 building of similar function that stood at another location and was torn down to build a school. Significant elements of the old building (most notably its windows and parts of its framing) were reused in the construction of the new building.

The building was listed on the National Register of Historic Places in 2000.

== See also ==
- National Register of Historic Places listings in Crawford County, Arkansas
