= No. 12 School =

Historic school building in rural Crawford County, Arkansas, United States

- U.S. National Register of Historic Places
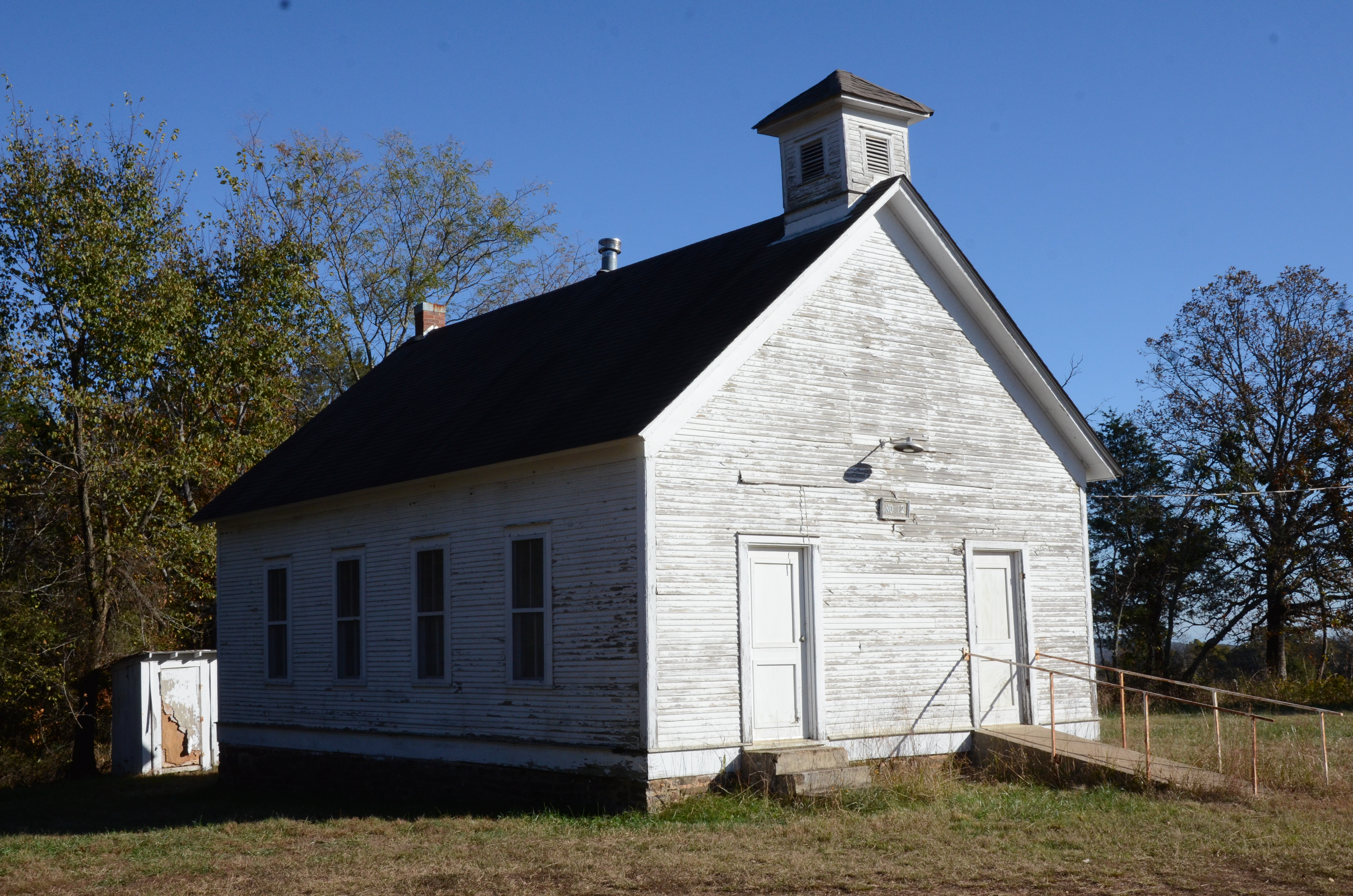

- Location within Arkansas Location within the United States
- Nearest city: Chester, Arkansas
- Coordinates: 35°42′13″N 94°15′13″W
- Area: less than one acre
- Built: 1895
- Architectural style: Plain Traditional
- NRHP reference No.: 95001481
- Added to NRHP: January 4, 1996

The No. 12 School is a historic one-room schoolhouse building in rural Crawford County, Arkansas. It is located on the east side of Freedom Road, a short way north of its road junction with Old 12 Cross Roads about 6 miles (9.7 km) west of Chester. It is a single-story wood vernacular frame structure with a small belfry and two entrances. Its date of construction is not documented, but it was being used as a district school in the late 19th century, a role it fulfilled until the area's district schools were consolidated in 1946. It has since served as a community meeting hall.

The building was listed on the National Register of Historic Places in 1996.

== See also ==
- National Register of Historic Places listings in Crawford County, Arkansas
