= Cedarville High School =

Cedarville High School may refer to:

- Cedarville High School (Arkansas), located in Cedarville, Arkansas
- Cedarville High School (Cedarville, Ohio)
