= Butterfield Overland Mail Route Lee Creek Road Segment =

- U.S. National Register of Historic Places
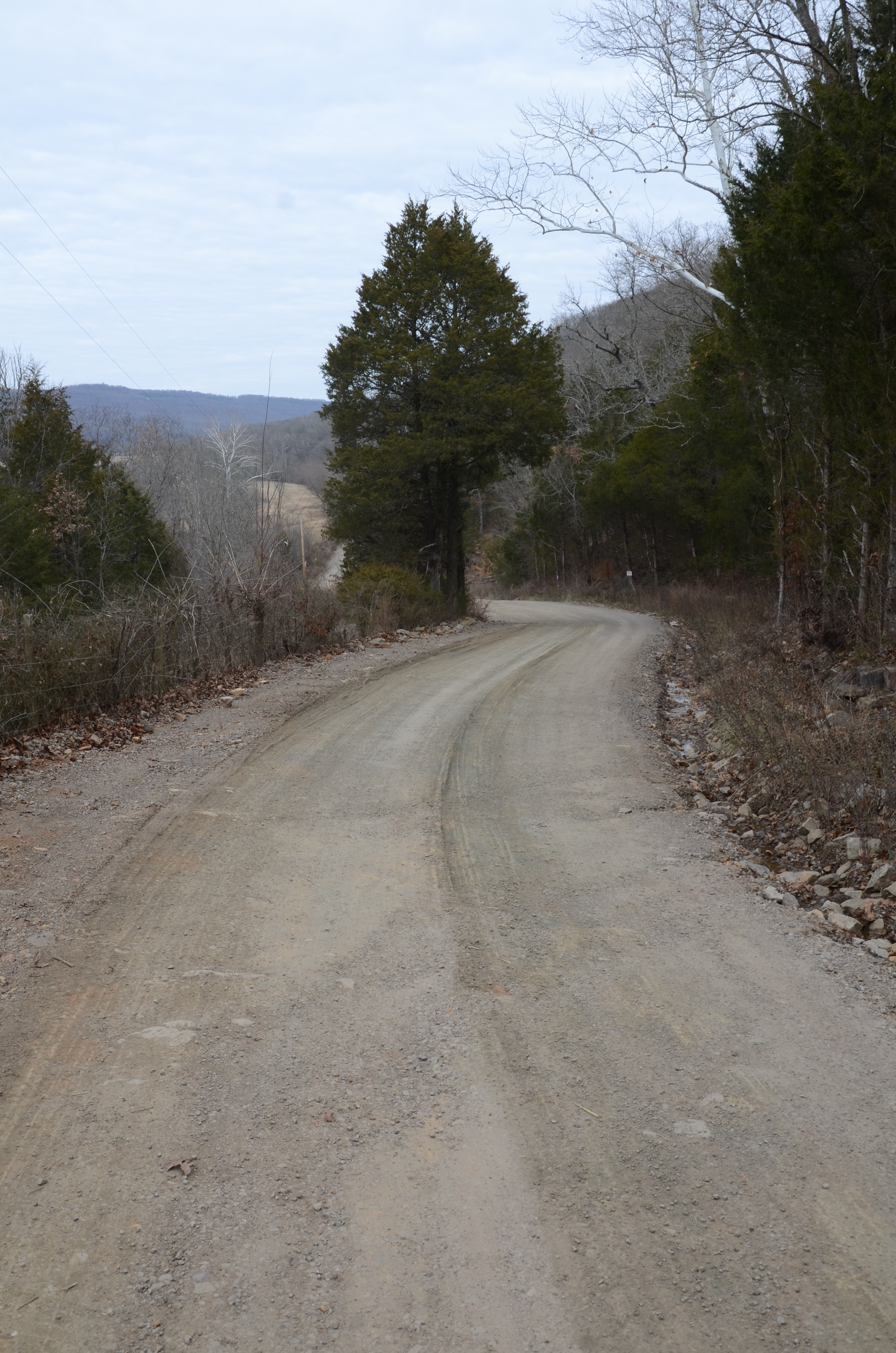

- Location within Arkansas Location within the United States
- Nearest city: Cedarville, Arkansas
- Coordinates: 35°40′20″N 94°20′53″W
- Area: 12 acres (4.9 ha)
- Built: 1858
- NRHP reference No.: 09000770
- Added to NRHP: September 29, 2009

The Butterfield Overland Mail Route Lee Creek Road Segment is a historic stretch of road in Crawford County, Arkansas. It is a 3.1-mile (5.0 km) segment of Lee Creek Road, which diverges from Arkansas Highway 220 north of Cedarville. This road section appears to closely follow the original alignment of the main road in the region in 1839, which connected Fayetteville and Van Buren. This road was used by the Butterfield Overland Mail service between 1858 and 1861. It is a gravel roadway about 12 feet (3.7 m) wide, with several deeply-cut sections.

The road was listed on the National Register of Historic Places in 2009.

== See also ==
- National Register of Historic Places listings in Crawford County, Arkansas
