= Beverly Pyle =

Arkansas politician

Beverly Pyle is a politician and business owner who served in the Arkansas House of Representatives as a member of the Republican party, representing District 83 from 2005 to 2011. She lives in Cedarville, Arkansas and served as its mayor.

Pile served in the Cedarville City Council and served as its mayor for six years, and then became treasurer of Crawford County, Arkansas. She is married and has four children.
