= Col. Jacob Yoes Building =

- U.S. National Register of Historic Places
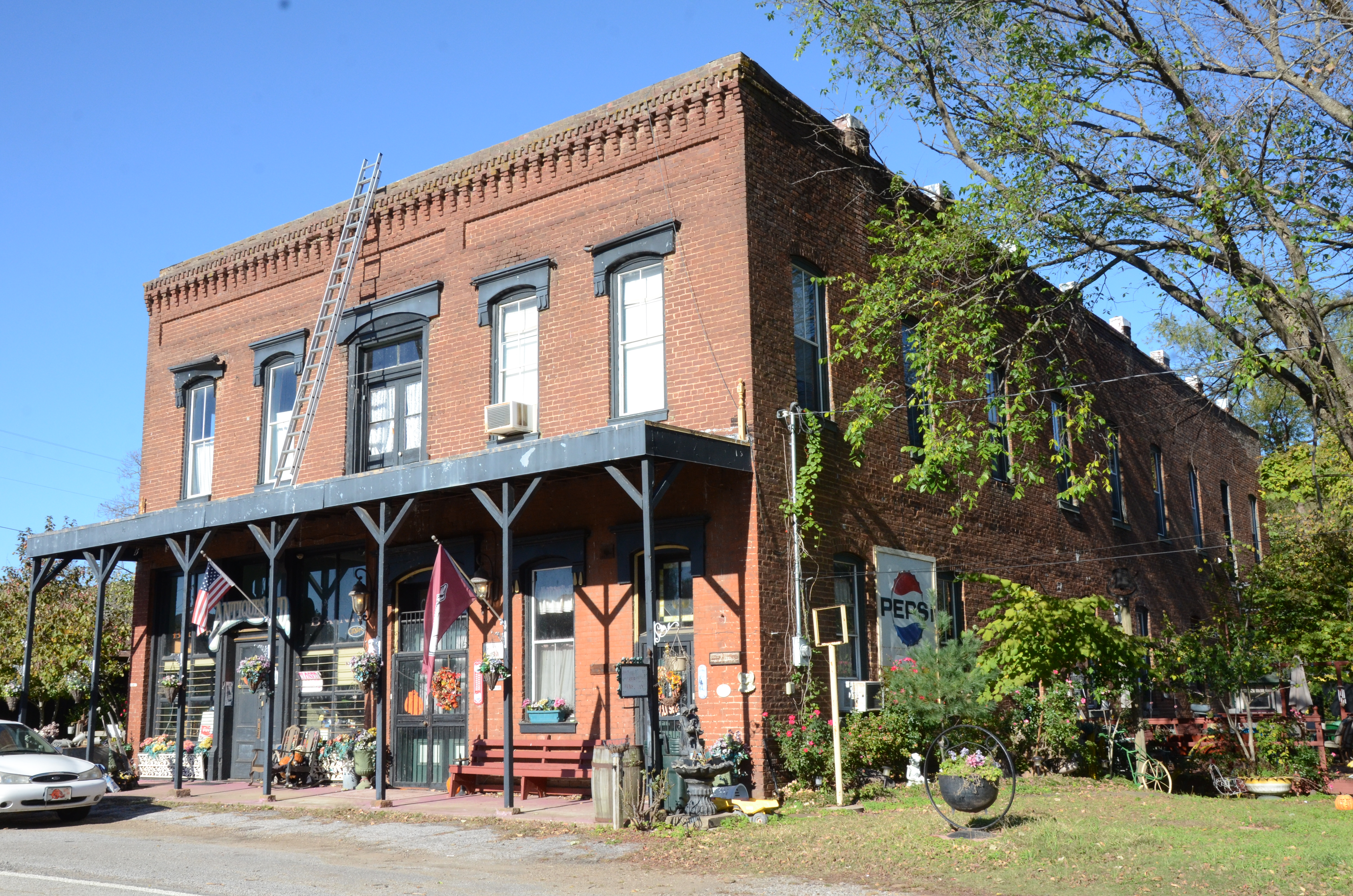

- Location within Arkansas Location within the United States
- Location: Front St., Chester, Arkansas
- Coordinates: 35°40′44″N 94°10′27″W
- Area: less than one acre
- Built: 1887
- NRHP reference No.: 75000380
- Added to NRHP: June 5, 1975

The Col. Jacob Yoes Building is a historic commercial building on Front Street in Chester, Arkansas. It is a two-story brick structure, with styling typical to its 1887 construction date. It has segmented-arch windows, a band of corbelled brickwork at the cornice, below the flat sloping roof. The building was designed to house a dry goods store in one storefront, and a hotel lobby in the other, with guest rooms on the second floor. It is the only commercial building in the center of Chester to survive a pair of devastating fires in the early 20th century.

The building was listed on the National Register of Historic Places in 1975.

== See also ==
- National Register of Historic Places listings in Crawford County, Arkansas
