= Cedarville High School (Arkansas) =

Location
- 9500 Pirates Point; Cedarville, Arkansas 72932; United States
- Coordinates: 35°34′22″N 94°22′0″W

Information
- School type: Public (government funded)
- Status: Open
- School district: Cedarville School District
- NCES District ID: 0504080
- Authority: Arkansas Department of Education (ADE)
- CEEB code: 040410
- NCES School ID: 050408000150
- Teaching staff: 25.42 (on FTE basis)
- Grades: 9–12
- Enrollment: 243 (2023–2024)
- Student to teacher ratio: 9.56
- Education system: ADE Smart Core curriculum
- Classes offered: Regular, Advanced Placement
- Campus type: Rural
- Colors: Royal blue and gold
- Athletics: Football, Golf, Basketball, Tennis, Baseball, Softball, Track & Field, Cheer, and Cross Country
- Athletics conference: 3A Region 4 (football); 3A Region 1 West (basketball) (2012–14)
- Mascot: Pirate
- Team name: Cedarville Pirates
- Accreditation: ADE
- Yearbook: Pirate Pride
- Feeder schools: Cedarville Middle School (grades 5–8)
- Affiliation: Arkansas Activities Association
- Website: hs.cedarvilleschools.org

Cedarville High School (CHS) is a comprehensive public high school serving students in grades nine through twelve in the rural community of Cedarville, Arkansas, United States. It is one of five public high schools located in Crawford County and serves the communities of Cedarville, Uniontown, Van Buren, Rudy, Natural Dam, and Chester.

With more than 325 students, it is the sole high school of the Cedarville School District.

== Academics ==
The school is accredited by the Arkansas Department of Education (ADE). The assumed course of study follows the Smart Core curriculum developed by the ADE, which requires students to complete at least 24 credit units before graduation. Students engage in regular (core) and career focus courses and exams and may select Advanced Placement (AP) coursework and exams that may lead to college credit.

== Athletics ==
The Cedarville High School mascot and athletic emblem is the Pirate with the school colors of royal blue and gold.

The Cedarville Pirates participate in various interscholastic activities in the 3A Classification within the 3A Region 4 Conference in football and 3A Region 1 West for basketball as administered by the Arkansas Activities Association. The Pirates school athletic activities include football, golf (boys/girls), cross country (boys/girls), basketball (boys/girls), baseball, softball, cheer, and track and field (boys/girls).

- Softball: The Lady Pirates slowpitch softball team won a state softball championship in 1999.
