= Cedarville School Building =

- U.S. National Register of Historic Places
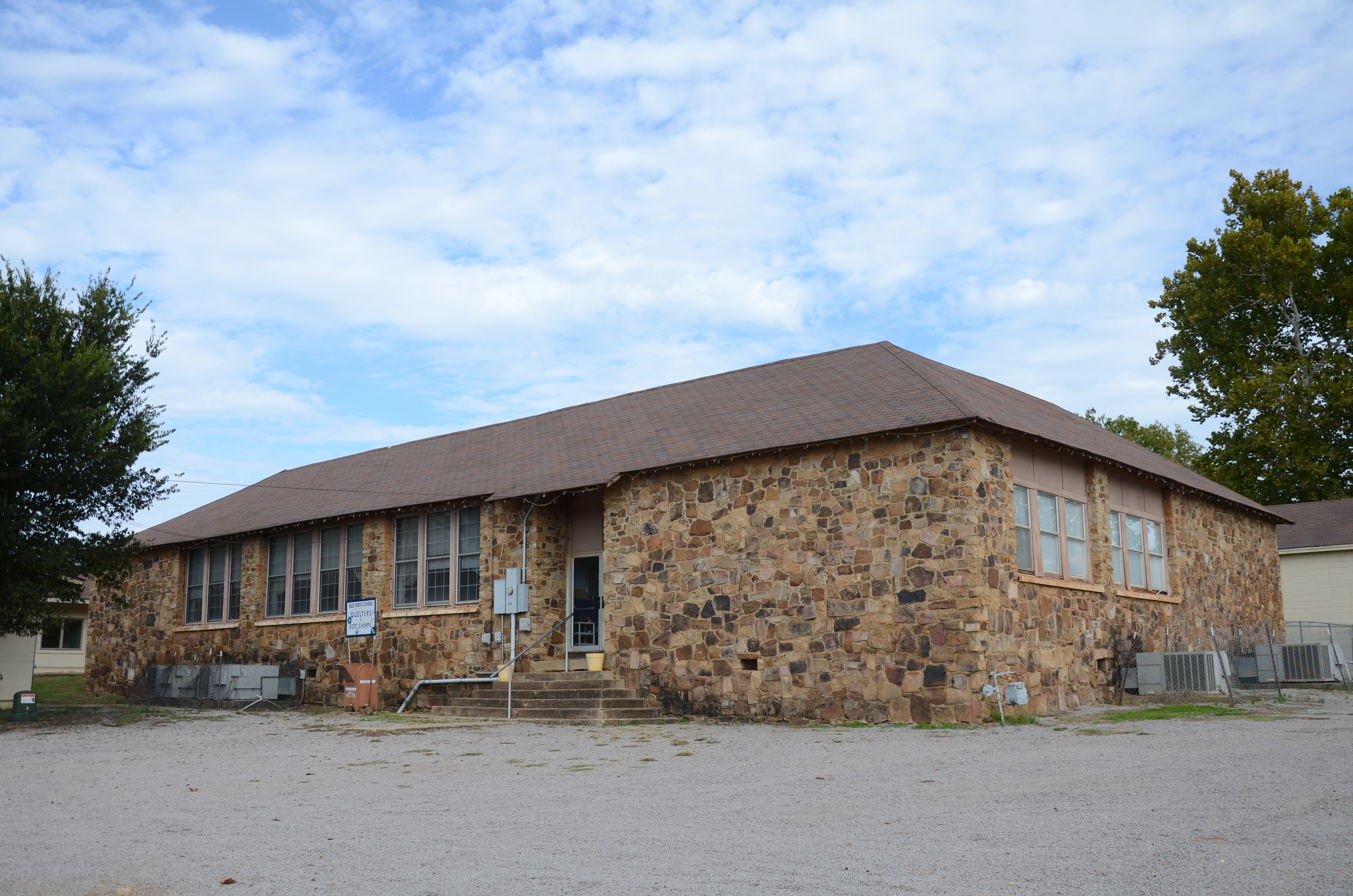

- Location within Arkansas Location within the United States
- Location: 639 Pirates Way, Cedarville, Arkansas
- Coordinates: 35°34′20″N 94°21′59″W
- Area: less than one acre
- Architectural style: Late 19th And Early 20th Century American Movements, Plain Traditional
- MPS: Public Schools in the Ozarks MPS
- NRHP reference No.: 92001217
- Added to NRHP: September 10, 1992

The Cedarville School Building, also known as the Old Rock School, is a historic school building on Crawford County Road 523 in Cedarville, Arkansas. It is a single-story rectangular masonry stone structure, with a deck-on-hip roof and a stone foundation. Its main facade (facing west) has a recessed entry under a slightly projecting shed roof, with three banks of sash windows to its left. The school was built in 1931, and initially served as the city's high school. The building now serves as a community center.

The building was listed on the National Register of Historic Places in 1992.

== See also ==
- National Register of Historic Places listings in Crawford County, Arkansas
