= Jacob Yoes =

American judge (1839–1906)

Member of the Arkansas House of Representatives from the 7th district
- In office April 2, 1868 – January 2, 1871 Serving with S. Bard, E.D. Fenno, J. F. Owen
- Preceded by: redistricted
- Succeeded by: various

Personal details
- Born: December 3, 1839 Winslow, Arkansas
- Died: February 6, 1906 (aged 66) Van Buren, Arkansas
- Resting place: Fort Smith National Cemetery
- Party: Republican
- Spouse: Mary Ann Reed
- Children: 11

Military service
- Allegiance: United States
- Branch/service: Union Army
- Years of service: 1862–1864
- Rank: Sergeant
- Unit: 1st Arkansas Cavalry, Company D
- Battles/wars: Civil War

Jacob Conrad Yoes (December 3, 1839 – February 6, 1906) was a farmer, soldier, merchant, politician, and United States Marshal in the Western District of Arkansas in the late 19th century.

== Early life ==
Yoes was born in 1839 to Reverend William Conrad and Kissiah (née Bloyed) Yoes between West Fork and Winslow in rural Washington County, Arkansas within the Ozark Mountains. At 17, he moved to Granby, Missouri at 17 to work in the booming lead and zinc mines of the Tri-State district. Six years later, he enlisted in the United States Army, 1st Arkansas Cavalry Regiment during the Civil War. Primarily skirmishing bushwhackers, the unit fought at the Battle of Prairie Grove, where Yoes was shot twice and taken prisoner. Released during a prisoner exchange on August 18, 1863, Yoes refused a commission as first lieutenant in 1864 and was discharged.

== Reconstruction Era ==
During his military service, Yoes had been elected Washington County Sheriff. Following his discharge, he assumed office and was re-appointed in 1867. As the Frisco Railroad was constructed through his hometown between Fayetteville and Fort Smith, Yoes started a series retail stores in the small towns along the new railroad, such as the Col. Jacob Yoes Building in Chester as well as a flour mill, hotels, and other businesses. Elected to the Arkansas House of Representatives during the 17th Arkansas General Assembly, Yoes served a single term as a Republican during the turbulent Radical Reconstruction era. During this period, Governor of Arkansas Powell Clayton declared martial law in Arkansas for four months due to the rise of the Ku Klux Klan and violence against African-Americans and Republicans.

== U.S. Marshal ==
Yoes was appointed U.S. Marshal of the Western District of Arkansas in May 1889 by President Benjamin Harrison. The court of that district included Western Arkansas and Indian Territory in its jurisdiction. As such, Yoes oversaw many deputies responsible for enforcing federal law in Indian Territory. Isaac C. Parker, known as the "Hanging Judge", was the federal judge for the district during Yoes' tenure.

The unincorporated community of Yoestown in Crawford County, Arkansas is named for Yoes.
