= Henry "Harry" Charles Pernot House =

Historic house in Arkansas, United States

- U.S. National Register of Historic Places
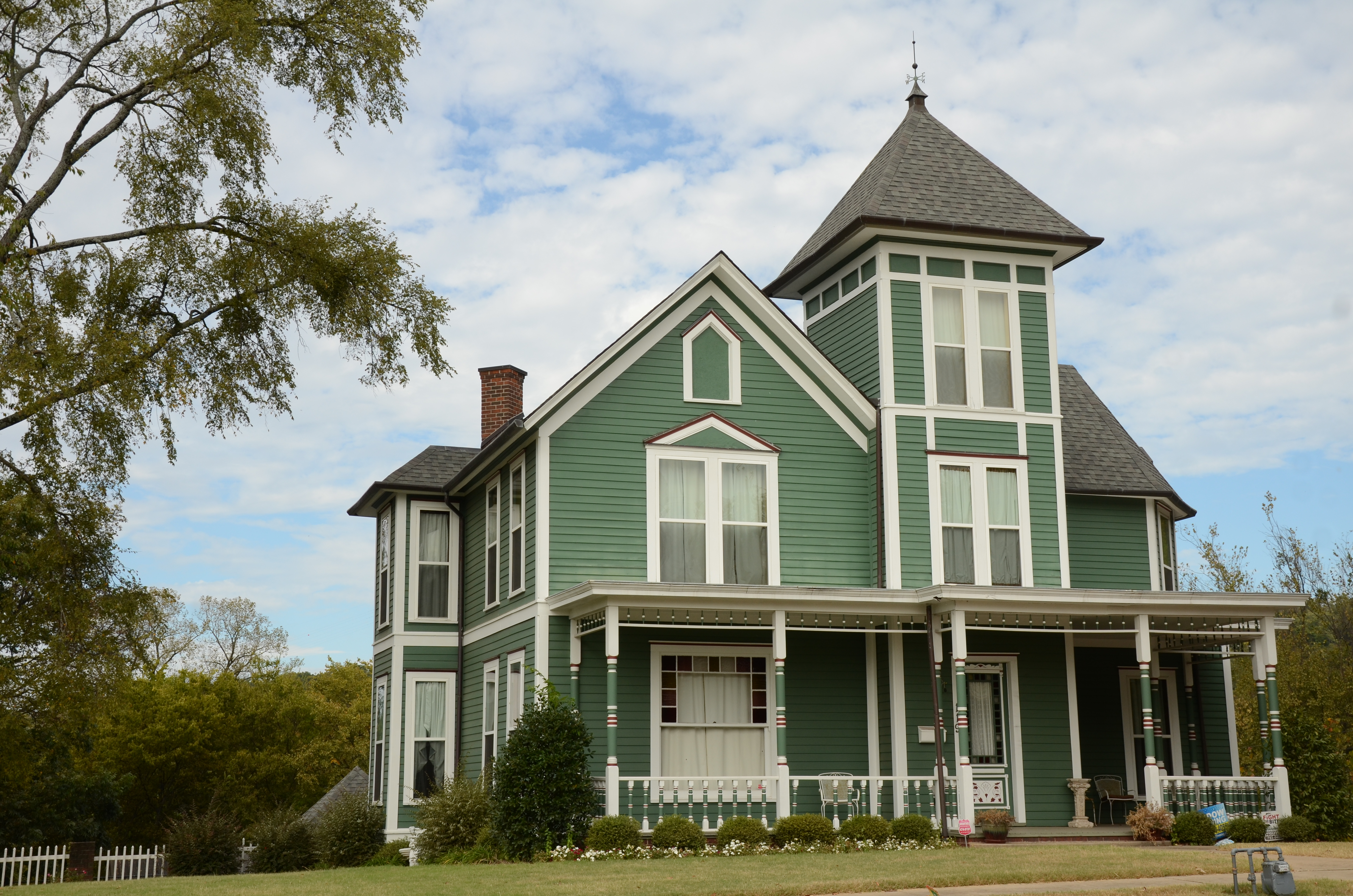

- Location within Arkansas Location within the United States
- Location: 119 Fayetteville Rd., Van Buren, Arkansas
- Coordinates: 35°26′20″N 94°21′9″W
- Area: less than one acre
- Built: c. 1900
- NRHP reference No.: 100001646
- Added to NRHP: September 21, 2017

The Henry "Harry" Charles Pernot House is a historic house at 119 Fayetteville Road in Van Buren, Arkansas. Built in the early 20th century, it is an eclectic and late example of blended Queen Anne and Second Empire architecture. It has asymmetrical massing and a tower, characteristic of the Second Empire, along with a Queen Anne porch that features turned posts and a spindled valance. Harry Pernot, who built it, was mayor of Van Buren, 1904–1909.

The house was listed on the National Register of Historic Places in 2017.

== See also ==
- National Register of Historic Places listings in Crawford County, Arkansas
