= Clarke–Harrell–Burson House =

Historic house in Arkansas, United States

- U.S. National Register of Historic Places
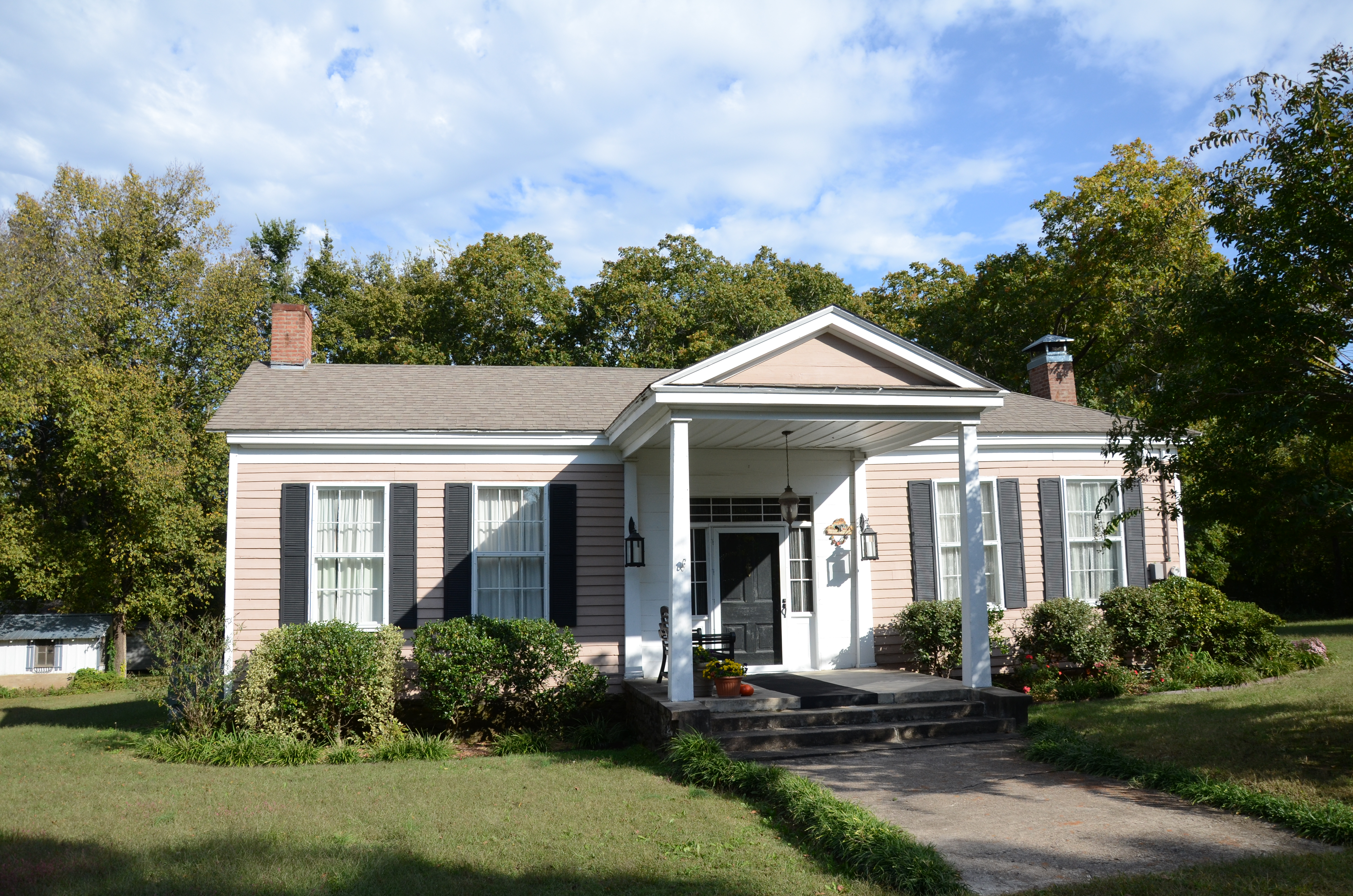

- Location within Arkansas Location within the United States
- Location: 603 Parkview, Van Buren, Arkansas
- Coordinates: 35°26′53″N 94°21′14″W
- Area: less than one acre
- Architectural style: Greek Revival, Vernacular Greek Revival
- NRHP reference No.: 91000582
- Added to NRHP: May 14, 1991

The Clarke–Harrell–Burson House is a historic house at 603 Parkview in Van Buren, Arkansas. It is a single-story wood-frame structure with Greek Revival styling, built about 1841, and is believed to have been the first non-log house built in the area known as Logtown that is now part of the city of Van Buren. The house is locally notable for several prominent residents: George Washington Clarke was the publisher of Arkansas's first newspaper west of Little Rock, the Intelligencer, which began publication in 1842 and was taken over by Clarke in 1844. The house's next owner, the Rev. Jonathan Harrell, was the first Methodist minister in the region, and a founding member of the Arkansas Methodist conference. Later in the 19th century it was owned by Dr. Edward Burson, a veteran of the American Civil War and a prominent local dentist.

The house was listed on the National Register of Historic Places in 1991.

== See also ==
- National Register of Historic Places listings in Crawford County, Arkansas
