= Muxen Building =

- U.S. National Register of Historic Places
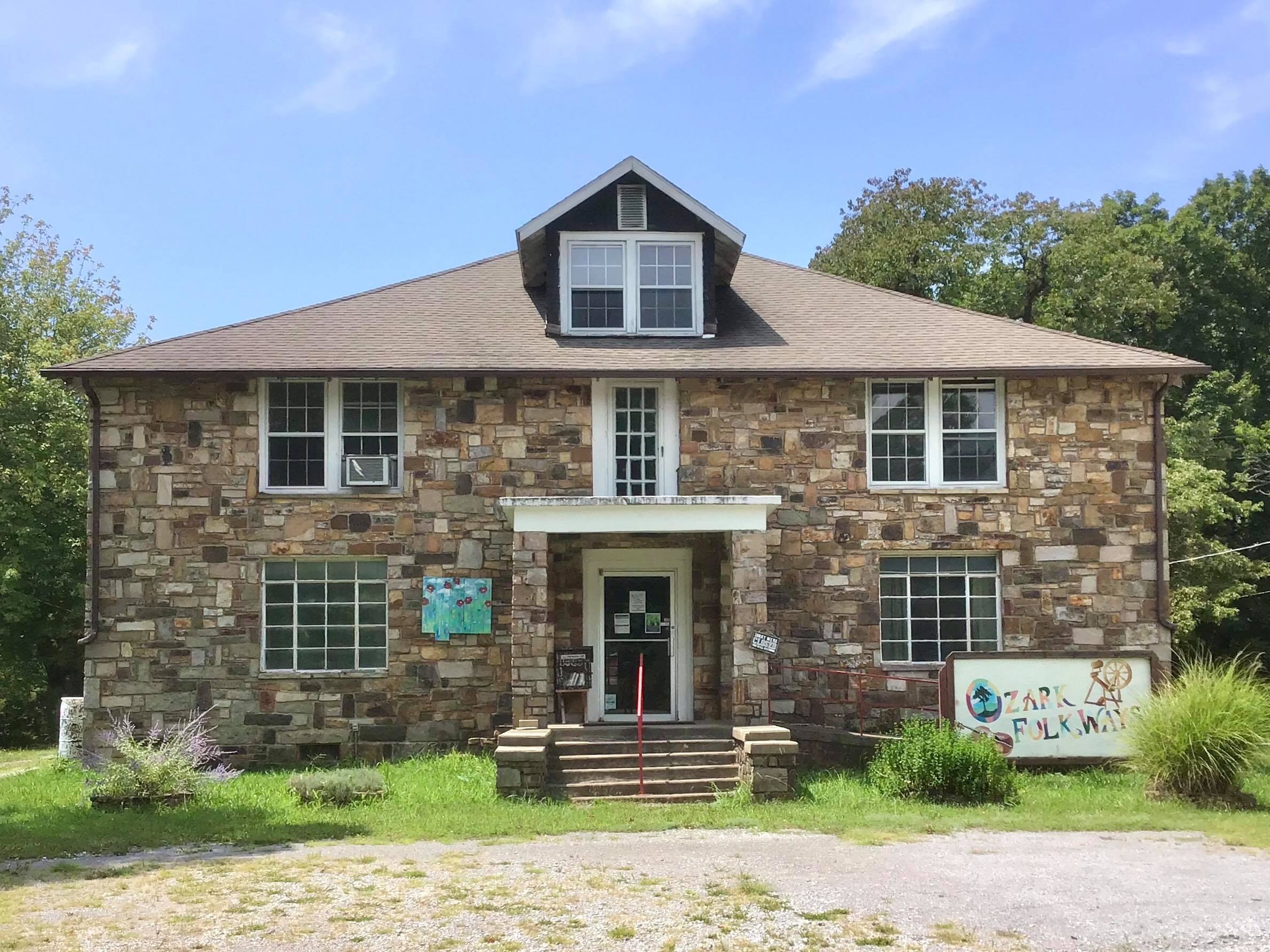

- Location within Arkansas Location within the United States
- Location: 22733 N. US 71 Mountainburg, Arkansas
- Coordinates: 35°45′39″N 94°6′57″W
- Area: 10 acres (4.0 ha)
- Built: c. c 1942
- Architectural style: Ozark Vernacular
- NRHP reference No.: 100003986
- Added to NRHP: May 29, 2019

The Muxen Building is a historic former school building in rural Crawford County, Arkansas. It is located on the west side of United States Route 71 south of Winslow, and next door to the Our Lady of the Ozarks Shrine. It is a single-story stone structure, built out of local fieldstone and set on a concrete foundation. It is covered by a broad hip roof with exposed rafter ends and projecting balconies on two sides. It was built to house a craft school founded by Clara Muxen, a Roman Catholic nun whose inspiration also led to the construction of the adjacent shrine.

The building was listed on the National Register of Historic Places in 2019.

== See also ==
- National Register of Historic Places listings in Crawford County, Arkansas
