= High Rock Petroglyph Shelter =

Archaeological site in Arkansas, United States

- U.S. National Register of Historic Places
- Nearest city: Rudy, Arkansas
- Area: 0.1 acres (0.040 ha)
- MPS: Rock Art Sites in Arkansas TR
- NRHP reference No.: 82002111
- Added to NRHP: May 4, 1982

The High Rock Petroglyph Shelter is a prehistoric rock art site in Crawford County, Arkansas. Set in a high and rugged location in the western Ozark Mountains with views of the surrounding countryside, the site includes a sheltered petroglyph (pecked or incised) representation of a human figure. The setting is one that is somewhat typical for other examples of rock art in the region.

The site was listed on the National Register of Historic Places in 1982.

== See also ==
- National Register of Historic Places listings in Crawford County, Arkansas
