= Mulberry Home Economics Building =

Historic place in Arkansas, United States

- U.S. National Register of Historic Places
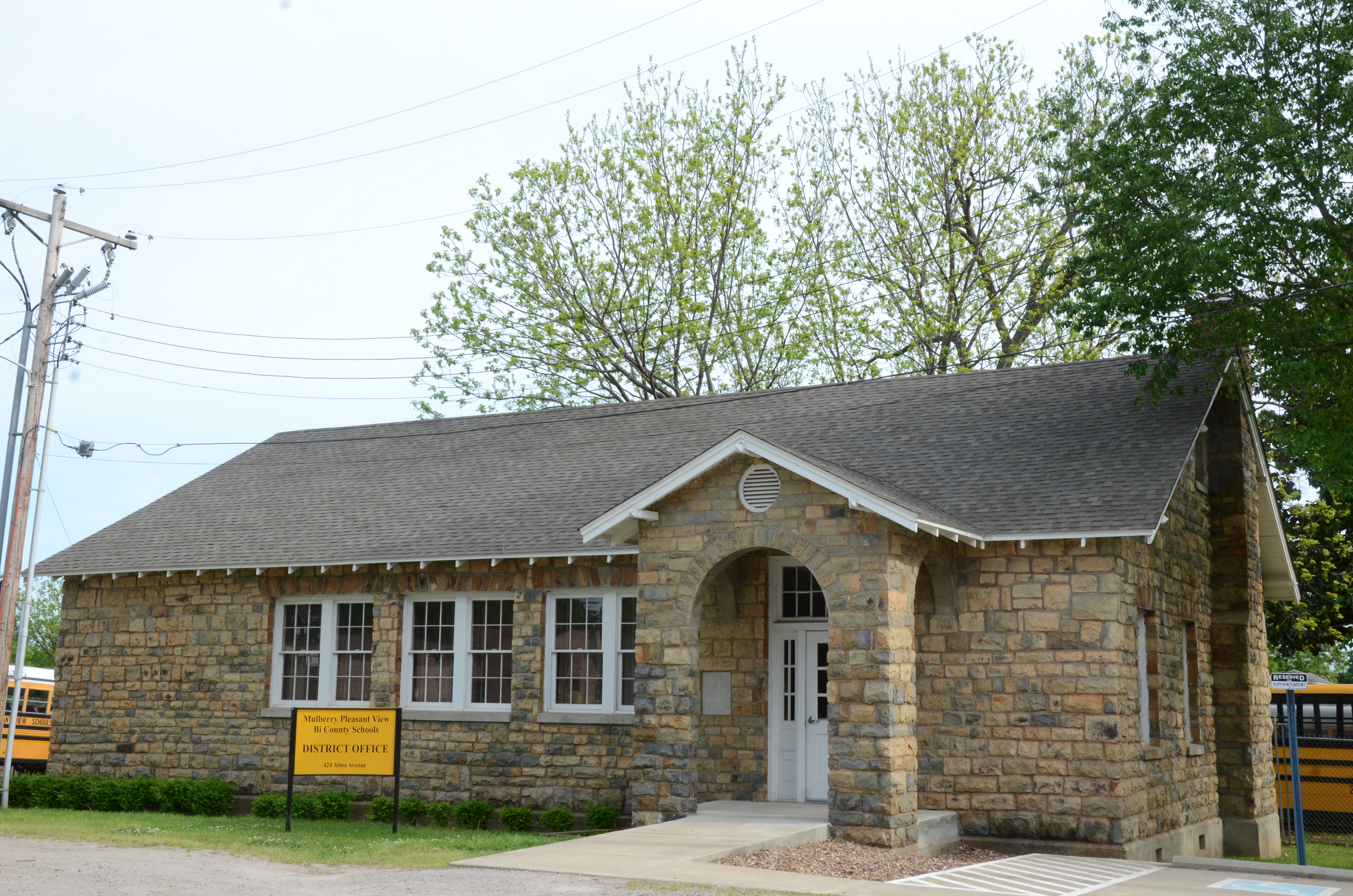

- Location within Arkansas Location within the United States
- Location: Behind Mulberry High School off Alma St., Mulberry, Arkansas
- Coordinates: 35°29′59″N 94°3′21″W
- Area: less than one acre
- Built by: National Youth Administration
- Architectural style: Bungalow/American Craftsman, Plain Traditional
- MPS: Public Schools in the Ozarks MPS
- NRHP reference No.: 92001218
- Added to NRHP: September 10, 1992

The Mulberry Home Economics Building is a historic school building in Mulberry, Arkansas. It is a single-story stone and masonry structure, located off West 5th Street behind the current Mulberry High School building. It has a rectangular plan, with a gable-on-hip roof and a projecting gable-roof entry pavilion on the north side near the western end. The pavilion exhibits modest Craftsman styling, with exposed rafters in the roof and arched openings. The south facade has a secondary entrance near the eastern end, and four irregularly sized and spaced window bays to its west. The building was erected in 1939 with funding assistance from the National Youth Administration.

The building was listed on the National Register of Historic Places in 1992.

== See also ==
- National Register of Historic Places listings in Crawford County, Arkansas
