= Van Buren Post Office =

United States historic post office

- U.S. National Register of Historic Places
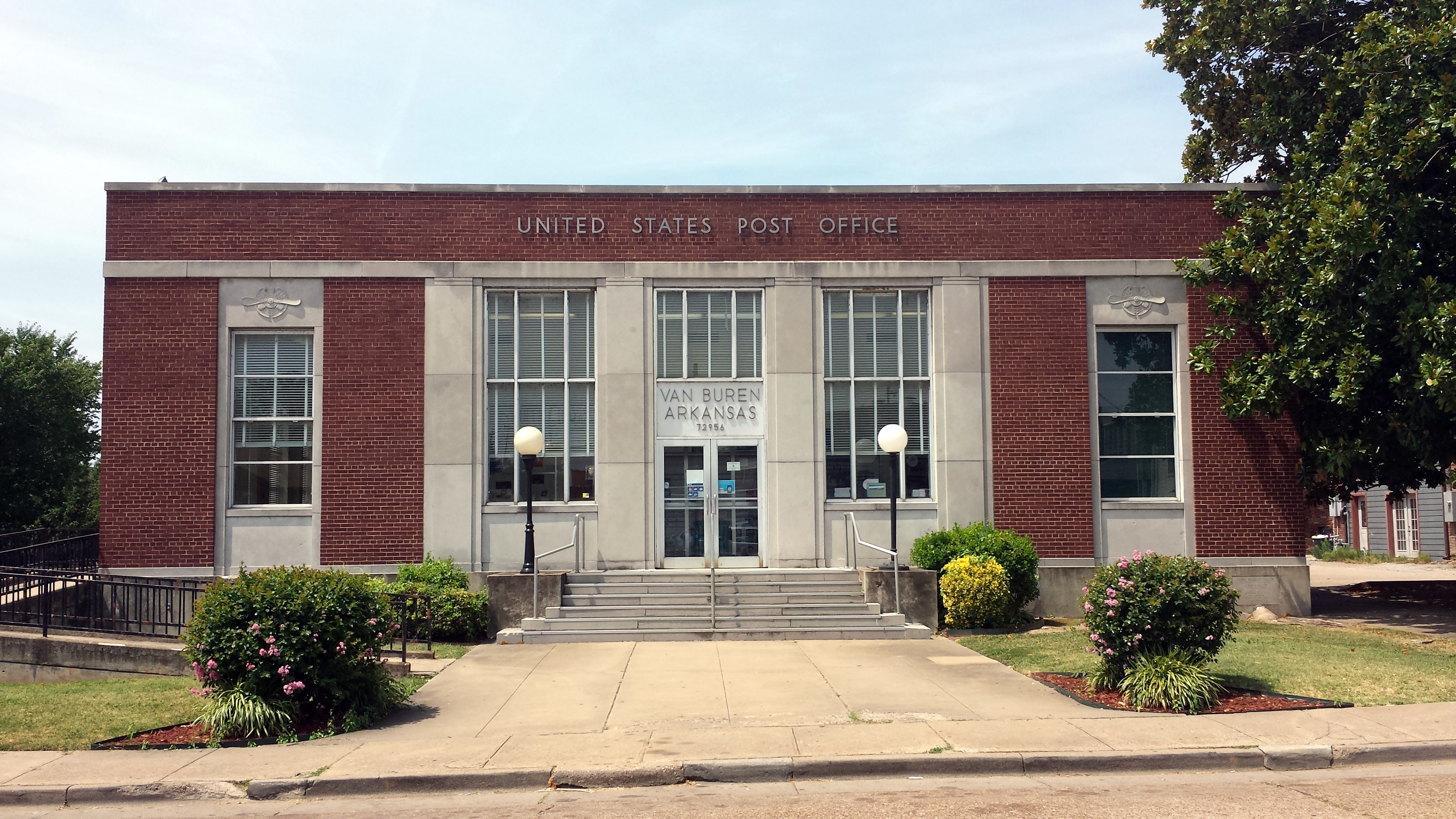

- Location within Arkansas Location within the United States
- Location: 22 S. Seventh St., Van Buren, Arkansas
- Coordinates: 35°26′8″N 94°20′58″W
- Area: less than one acre
- Built: 1936
- Architect: Hennings, E. Martin; et al.
- Architectural style: Art Deco
- MPS: Post Offices with Section Art in Arkansas MPS
- NRHP reference No.: 98000918
- Added to NRHP: August 14, 1998

The Van Buren Post Office is located at 22 South 7th Street in Van Buren, Arkansas. It is a single-story brick and stone building, with restrained Art Deco styling. The main entrance is topped by a panel with aluminum signage identifying the building, with a large window above. It is flanked by tall pilasters, beyond which are tall windows and another pair of pilasters. The outer bays of the facade, set off from the center, have windows topped by decorative Art Deco panels. The post office was built in 1936, and features a mural by E. Martin Hennings (a member of the Taos Society of Artists), that was executed in 1940 with funding from the Treasury Department's Section of Fine Arts.

The building was listed on the National Register of Historic Places in 1998.

== See also ==
- National Register of Historic Places listings in Crawford County, Arkansas
- List of United States post offices
- List of United States post office murals
