= Royal Wade Kimes =

American country music singer (born 1951)

- Born: Royal Wade Kimes; March 3, 1951 (age 74); Chester, Arkansas, U.S.
- Origin: Nashville, Tennessee, U.S.
- Genres: Country
- Occupation: Singer-songwriter
- Instrument: Vocals
- Years active: 1996–present
- Labels: Asylum, Wonderment

Royal Wade Kimes (born March 3, 1951) is an American country music singer.

== Biography ==
Kimes was the last cowboy to ride the Ark/Ok. border country, running cattle on the open range. He and his father ran a sawmill until he moved to Nashville, Tennessee, in 1983. He also worked at Loretta Lynn's dude ranch and later began recording demos through the encouragement of Eddy Arnold. Kimes also wrote the cut "We Bury the Hatchet" on Garth Brooks' album Ropin' the Wind, and signed with Asylum Records in 1996. The label released the single "Leave My Mama Out Of This", followed by his debut album Another Man's Sky.

Following Leave My Mama Out Of This was the album's title track, which was made into a music video. The album's third single, "Guardian Angel", received a positive review in Billboard, which called it "country to the core" and praised Kimes as a "talented songwriter". After Kimes left Asylum, he began recording for Wonderment Records. Kimes charted at number 60 on the Hot Country Songs chart dated January 3, 2004 with "Mile High Honey". Following the song Mile High Honey Kimes began having hits abroad on Hot Disc Top 40/1st release On The Border topped the chart at no.1 followed by Ride at no.1 His song Cut The Line top out at no 2 and more followed.

== Discography ==
=== Albums ===
| Title | Album details | |
|---|---|---|
| Another Man's Sky | Release date: 1996; Label: Asylum Records | |
| A Dyin' Breed | Release date: 2002; Label: Wonderment Records | |
| Cowboy Cool | Release date: 2004; Label: Wonderment Records | |
| Snow | Release date: 2005; Label: Wonderment Records | |
| Snow | Release Date: 2000; Label: Wonderment Records | |
| Hangin' Around the Moon- producer - Mike Noble | Release date: 2005; Label: Wonderment Records | |
| Strikin' Matches- producer - Mike Noble- George Bradfute - royal wade kimes | Release date: 2006; Label: Wonderment Records | |
| How the West Was Sung- producer - Mike Noble | Release date: 2008; Label: Wonderment Records | |
| White Light | Release date: 2009; Label: Wonderment Records | |
| Crossing the Roads | Release date: 2011; Label: Wonderment Records | |
| A Proud Land- producer - royal wade kimes | Release date: 2012; Label: Wonderment Records; Release Date: 2015; Label: Wonderment Records | |
| Shadows Of Time- producer - royal wade kimes | Release date: 2017; -Label" Wonderment Records | Love Of A Cowboy - producer - Royal Wade Kimes |

=== Singles ===
| Year | Single | Peak chart positions | Album |
| Year | Single | US Country | Album |
|---|---|---|---|
| 1996 | "Leave My Mama Out of This" | — | Another Man's Sky |
| 1997 | "Another Man's Sky" | — | Another Man's Sky |
| 1997 | "Guardian Angel" | — | Another Man's Sky |
| 2002 | "There Ain't Enough Miles" | — | A Dyin' Breed |
| 2003 | "Night Birds" (with Garth Brooks) | — | A Dyin' Breed |
| 2003 | "Mile High Honey" | 60 | A Dyin' Breed |
| 2004 | "Knockin' on Heaven's Door" | — | Cowboy Cool |
| 2004 | "Feelin' Stud" | — | Cowboy Cool |
| 2006 | "I've Got Your Back" | — | Strikin' Matches |
| 2011 | "I'm an Ole Song" | — | Crossing the Roads |
| 2011 | "500 Miles Away from Home" | — | Crossing the Roads |
"—" denotes releases that did not chart

=== Music videos ===
| Year | Title | Director | | | |
|---|---|---|---|---|---|
| 1997 | "Another Man's Sky" | Norry Niven | | | |
| "On The Border" | -director - Raymond Martin | 2002 director Raymond Martin | "There Ain't Enough Miles" | "In My Land" Director - Raymond Martin|2006 scope="row"| "Strikin' Matches In The Rain" | 2011 = "1969" director - Royal Wade Kimes |
| "Cold Country" - director - Royal Wade Kimes -2012 scope= "row" "Dixie Burns" - director - Royal Wade Kimes 2015 = "The Gentleman Outlaw Invades Buckaroo Hatters" - director - Royal Wade Kimes | 2018 = "Healer of Hearts" - director - Royal Wade Kimes 2019 = "Bittersweet" - director - Royal Wade Kimes | 2002 director Raymond Martin | | | |

2020 = "Symbols of Freedom" - director - Royal Wade Kimes
