= Joseph Starr Dunham House =

Historic house in Arkansas, United States

- U.S. National Register of Historic Places
- Location within Arkansas Location within the United States
- Location: 418 Broadway, Van Buren, Arkansas
- Coordinates: 35°25′59″N 94°21′6″W
- Area: less than one acre
- Built: 1870
- Architectural style: Gothic
- NRHP reference No.: 76000400
- Added to NRHP: May 3, 1976

The Joseph Starr Dunham House is a historic house at 418 Broadway in Van Buren, Arkansas. Built c. 1870, this 1 1/2-story wood-frame house is a fine local example of Gothic Revival architecture, with a steeply pitched side-gable roof that has front-facing gable dormers decorated with sawn woodwork, and a full-width front porch with spiral posts and delicate brackets. Joseph Starr Dunham, the owner, was a Connecticut native who settled in Van Buren in 1859 and began publishing the Van Buren Press; the house was still in family hands when it was listed on the National Register of Historic Places in 1976.

== See also ==
- National Register of Historic Places listings in Crawford County, Arkansas
