= Lee Creek Bridge (Natural Dam, Arkansas) =

- Formerly listed on the U.S. National Register of Historic Places
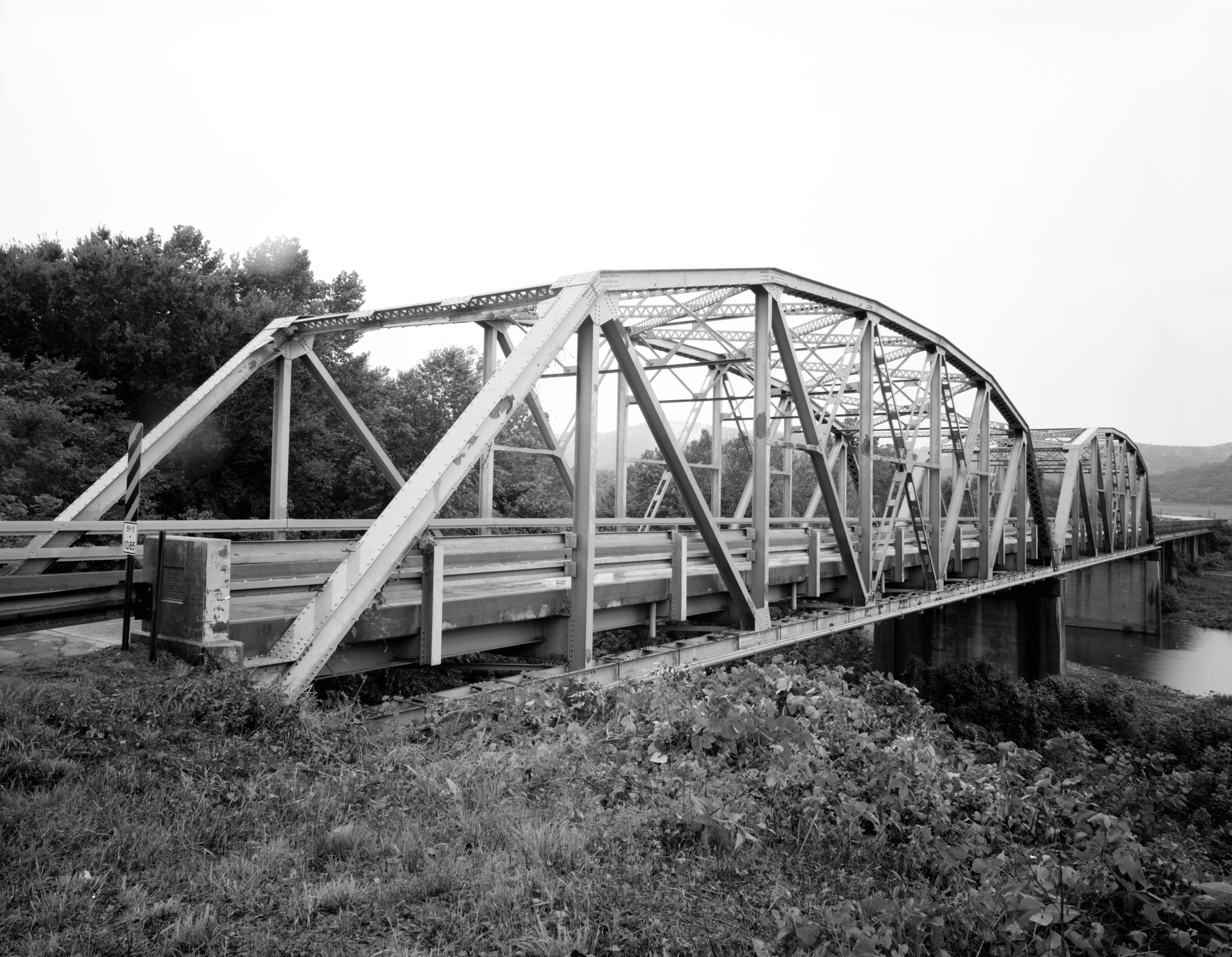
- HAER photo, 1988

- Location within Arkansas Location within the United States
- Location: AR 59 over Lee Creek, Natural Dam, Arkansas
- Coordinates: 35°38′46″N 94°23′37″W
- Area: less than one acre
- Built: 1934
- Architect: Arkansas Highway & Transportation; M. E. Gillioz
- Architectural style: Pennsylvania through truss
- MPS: Historic Bridges of Arkansas MPS
- NRHP reference No.: 90000508

Significant dates
- Added to NRHP: April 6, 1990
- Removed from NRHP: January 24, 2019

The Lee Creek Bridge in Natural Dam, Arkansas was a Pennsylvania through truss bridge that was built in 1934. It was a twin-span bridge with a total length of 587 feet (179 m), which carried Arkansas Highway 59 across Lee Creek. It rested on concrete piers and abutments, had a vertical clearance of 14 feet (4.3 m) and had a roadbed 22 feet (6.7 m) wide.

The bridge was listed on the National Register of Historic Places in 1990, at which time it was one of four surviving Pennsylvania through truss bridges in the state. Another bridge, in Van Buren, also crosses Lee Creek and is listed on the National Register.

This bridge was demolished and replaced in early 2018, and was removed from the National Register early in 2019.

== See also ==
- Lee Creek Bridge (Van Buren, Arkansas)
- List of bridges documented by the Historic American Engineering Record in Arkansas
- List of bridges on the National Register of Historic Places in Arkansas
- National Register of Historic Places listings in Crawford County, Arkansas
