= Henry Clay Mills House =

Historic house in Arkansas, United States

- Formerly listed on the U.S. National Register of Historic Places
- Location within Arkansas Location within the United States
- Location: 425 N. 15th St., Van Buren, Arkansas
- Coordinates: 35°26′30″N 94°20′33″W
- Area: less than one acre
- Built: 1892
- NRHP reference No.: 77000250

Significant dates
- Added to NRHP: December 16, 1977
- Removed from NRHP: January 26, 2018

The Henry Clay Mills House was a historic house at 425 North 15th Street in Van Buren, Arkansas. This modest frame house was built in 1892 by Henry Clay Mills, an African-American former slave turned businessman. Mills was born into slavery in 1847, and after the American Civil War worked for many years as a laborer on a plantation near Mulberry. He eventually developed a moving and shipping business in Van Buren, typifying advancement of African-Americans of the period from agricultural to non-agricultural economic opportunities.

The house was listed on the National Register of Historic Places in 1977. It has apparently been demolished, and was delisted in 2018.

== See also ==
- National Register of Historic Places listings in Crawford County, Arkansas
