= 1st Arkansas Cavalry Regiment (Union) =

1st Arkansas Cavalry (Union)
- Active: July 1862 – August 1865
- Disbanded: August 1865
- Country: United States
- Allegiance: Union
- Branch: Cavalry
- Garrison/HQ: Fayetteville, Arkansas
- Engagements: American Civil War: Battle of Prairie Grove; Action at Fayetteville

Commanders
- Notable commanders: Col. Marcus LaRue Harrison; Capt. Jacob Abraham Ryker

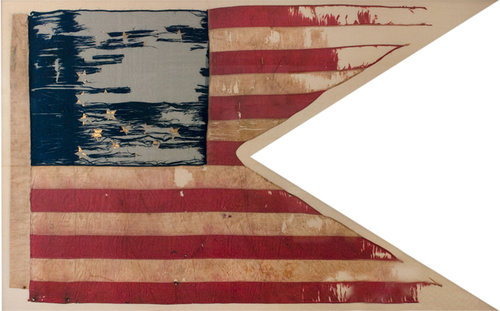
Guidon flag used by the First Arkansas

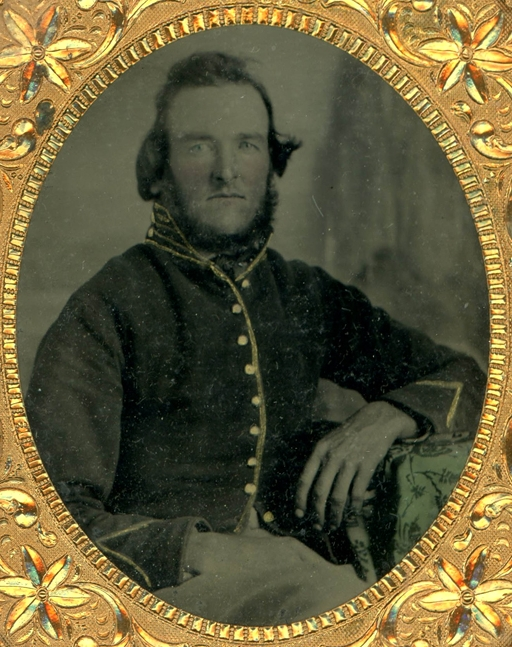
Joshua Dodd, Company C, 1st Arkansas Cavalry

The 1st Arkansas Cavalry Regiment (1862–1865) was a cavalry regiment from the state of Arkansas that served in the Union Army during the American Civil War.

== Organization ==
Arkansas had seceded from the Union in May 1861 and joined the Confederate States of America, raising during the war a total of 48 infantry regiments, more than 30 cavalry regiments and another 25 cavalry battalions, and about 22 artillery batteries for the Confederate Army.

Upon the institution of conscription in Arkansas in 1862 by commander of the Trans-Mississippi Department, Thomas C. Hindman, many pro-Union families fled north into Missouri. The first Union post that families fleeing northwest Arkansas encountered was in Cassville, where Captain Marcus LaRue Harrison of the 36th Illinois Infantry was serving as quartermaster. Harrison requested permission from the War Department to recruit a regiment from the men of these displaced families, and in the summer of 1862, the regiment was organized as the 1st Arkansas Cavalry in Springfield, Missouri.

== Service ==
It almost immediately moved south to Arkansas to counter the Confederate guerrillas who were harassing Union sympathizers. After the Union victory at the Battle of Pea Ridge, Union forces briefly occupied parts of Northern Arkansas. When they moved their headquarters to Independence County, Arkansas, Union supporters were once again left exposed, causing many to move to Missouri.

The regiment first saw combat in the Battle of Prairie Grove, fought on December 7, 1862. They performed very poorly. A Confederate surge sent two regiments of Missouri Union cavalry fleeing through the 1st Arkansas Cavalry. Seeing hundreds of their comrades fleeing, the Arkansas men joined in the rout. Because of its embarrassing performance, the regiment was assigned to duty in Fayetteville, Arkansas.

Confederate forces under Brigadier General William Lewis Cabell attacked the city on April 18, 1863. Both armies were composed entirely of Arkansas regiments. In three hours of fighting, the Confederates failed to break the Union lines and finally retreated. This victory boosted the 1st Arkansas's morale. For the remainder of the war they would serve on duty against guerrillas or as escort for wagon supply trains.

The First Arkansas Union Cavalry played a unique role in Civil War history. The troops, especially the enlisted men, were not Yankees but Southern Unionists. They were primarily from Northwest Arkansas, and were assigned to occupy their home town and county for two and a half years. It was a very bitter war among neighbors fighting each other as Confederate guerrillas and as Union cavalrymen. After the war the First Arkansas commander, Colonel Marcus LaRue Harrison, stayed on in Fayetteville and became its post-war mayor for a time.

== Mustered out of service ==
The regiment was mustered out of the army in August 1865. During their service, their casualties had been comparatively light. Out of its 1,765 men, 110 had been killed, and another 235 died from disease or accidents.

== See also ==
- Jacob Yoes
- List of Arkansas Civil War Union units
- List of United States Colored Troops Civil War Units
- Arkansas in the American Civil War

== Bibliography ==
- Dyer, Frederick H. (1959). A Compendium of the War of the Rebellion. New York and London. Thomas Yoseloff, Publisher. LCCN 59-12963.
- Bishop, Albert W. (1867). Report of the Adjutant General of Arkansas, for the Period of the Late Rebellion, and to November 1, 1866., (Washington : Govt. print. off., 1867).
