= Bryan House (Van Buren, Arkansas) =

Historic house in Arkansas, United States

- U.S. National Register of Historic Places
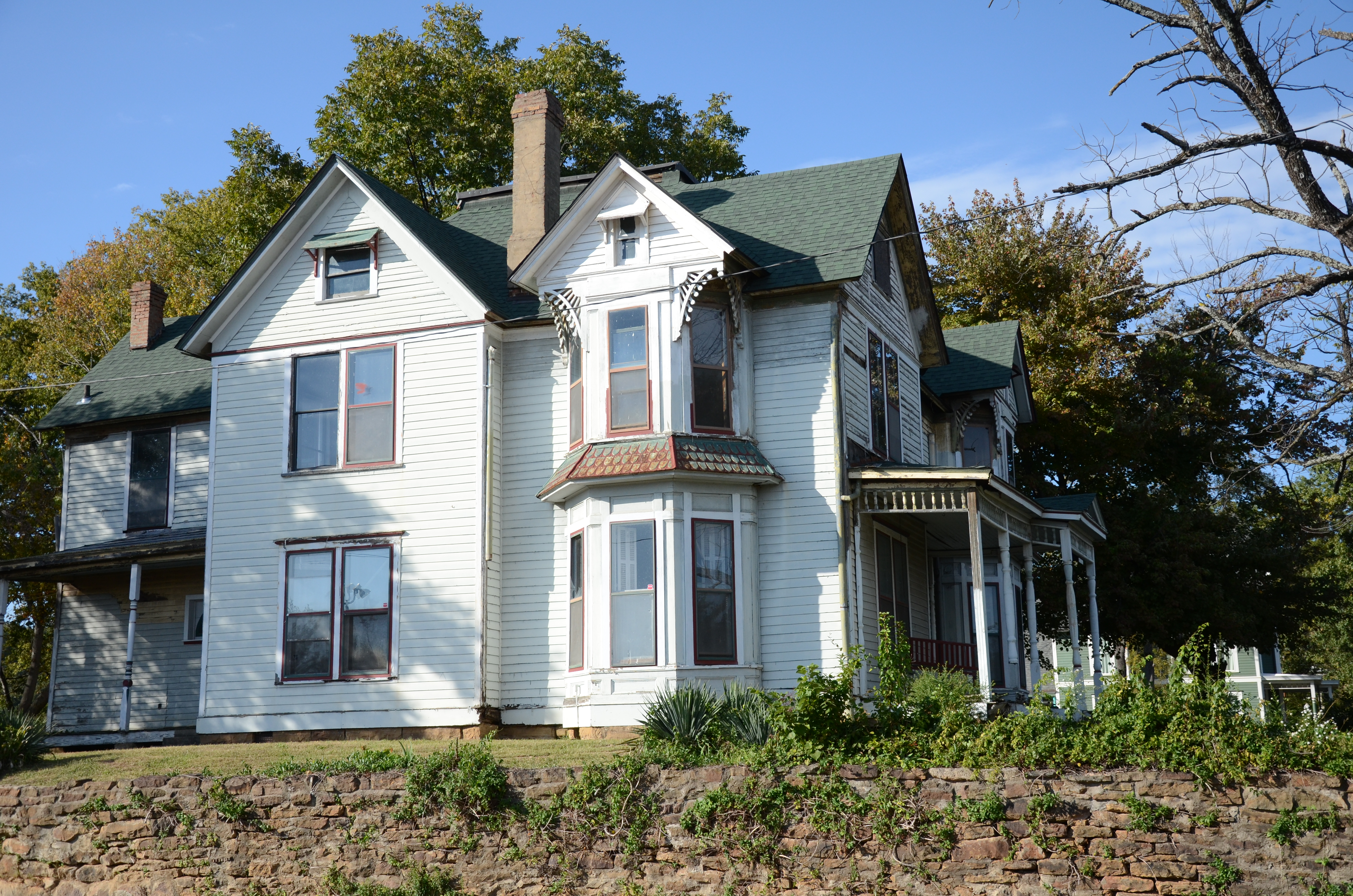

- Location within Arkansas Location within the United States
- Location: 105 Fayetteville St., Van Buren, Arkansas
- Coordinates: 35°26′17″N 94°21′9″W
- Area: less than one acre
- Built: 1886
- Built by: Lewis Bryan
- Architectural style: Late Victorian
- NRHP reference No.: 78000584
- Added to NRHP: January 9, 1978

The Bryan House is a historic house at 105 Fayetteville Street in Van Buren, Arkansas. Built in 1886, it is one of the city's finest Queen Anne Victorian houses, with asymmetrical massing, multiple gables and projecting bay sections, and elaborate exterior decoration. The interior also has well-preserved woodwork, hardware and other decoration. The house was built by Lewis Bryan as a summer house, and is notable beyond its architecture as the local headquarters for Bryan's cousin William Jennings Bryan during his runs for President of the United States.

The house was listed on the National Register of Historic Places in 1978.

== See also ==
- National Register of Historic Places listings in Crawford County, Arkansas
