= Lee Creek (Arkansas) =

Lee Creek Lee's Creek
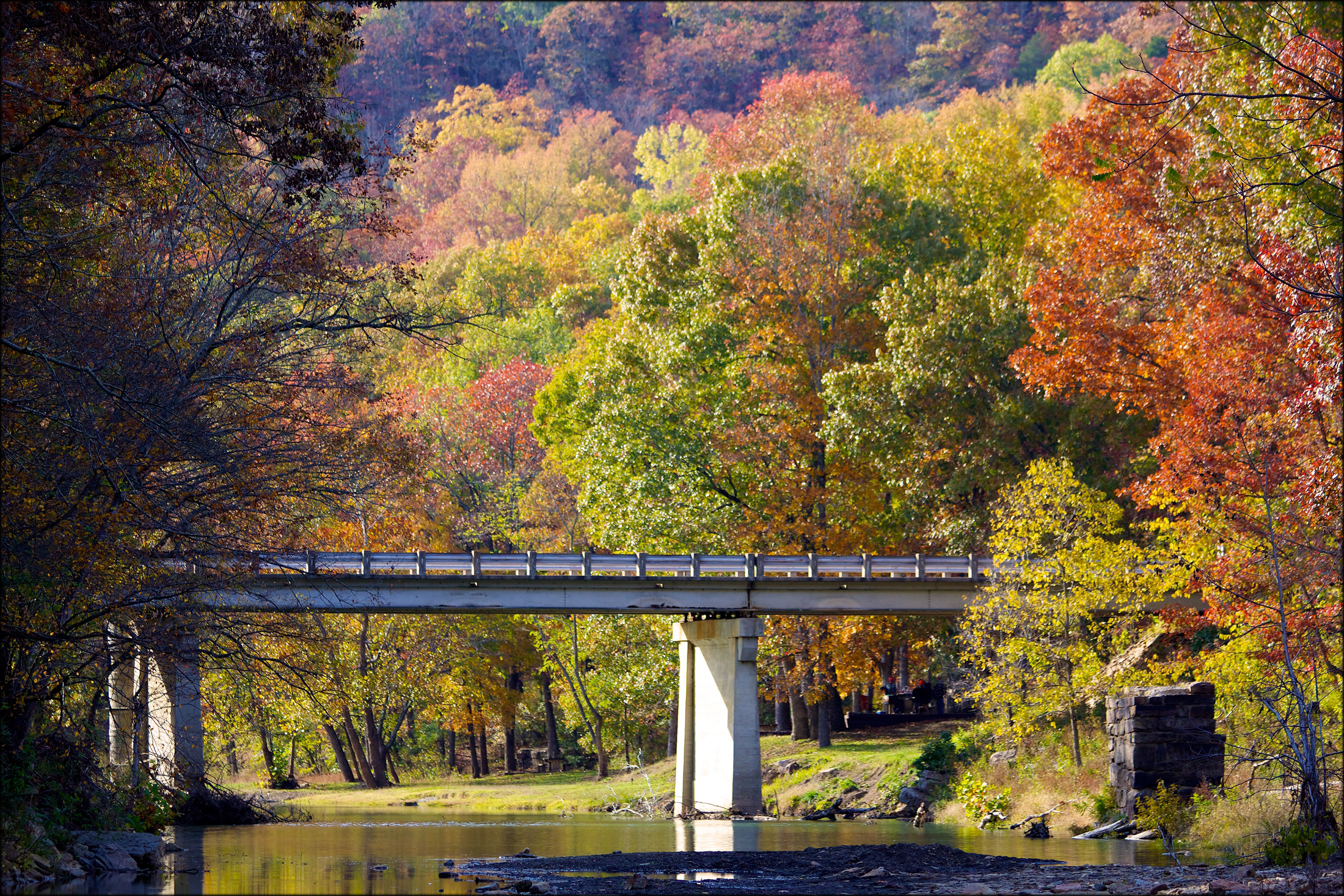
- The bridge across Lee Creek in Devil's Den State Park near Winslow, Arkansas

Location
- Country: United States
- States: Arkansas, Oklahoma

Physical characteristics
- Source
  - location: Washington County, Arkansas
  - coordinates: 35°52′42″N 94°11′51″W
- Mouth: Confluence with the Arkansas River
  - location: Crawford County, Arkansas
  - coordinates: 35°26′59″N 94°22′58″W
  - elevation: 394 ft (120 m)
- Length: 64.6 mi (104.0 km)
- Discharge
  - location: near Short
  - average: 544 cu ft/s (15.4 m^{3}/s)

Lee Creek is a 64.6-mile-long (104.0 km) river in Arkansas and Oklahoma which starts near West Fork in Washington County, Arkansas, and flows south to the Arkansas River passing through Crawford County, Arkansas, and Sequoyah County, Oklahoma. Lee Creek flows from Arkansas into Oklahoma, then returns to Arkansas before its confluence with the Arkansas River near Van Buren and Fort Smith.

Lee Creek is also known as Lee's Creek, mostly in Oklahoma where it is classified by the State of Oklahoma as a State Scenic River. In Arkansas upstream of the Oklahoma border, Lee Creek is classified by the State of Arkansas as an Extraordinary Resource Waterway.

== Crossings ==
- Lee Creek Bridge (Natural Dam, Arkansas)
- Lee Creek Bridge (Van Buren, Arkansas)

== See also ==
- Butterfield Overland Mail Route Lee Creek Road Segment
- List of rivers of Arkansas
