= Bryant-Lasater House =

Historic house in Arkansas, United States

- U.S. National Register of Historic Places
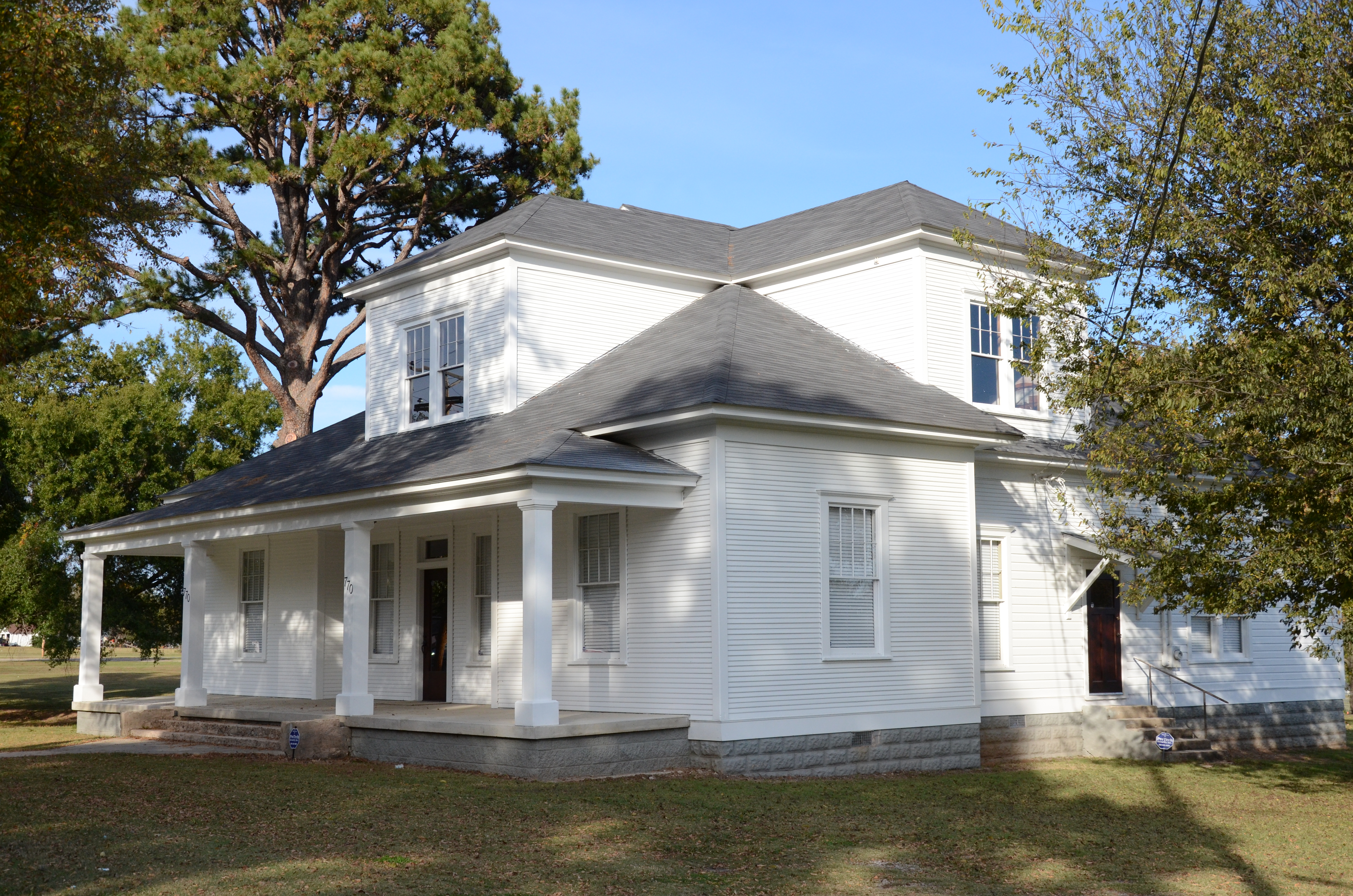

- Location within Arkansas Location within the United States
- Location: 770 N. Main St., Mulberry, Arkansas
- Coordinates: 35°30′28″N 94°3′5″W
- Area: less than one acre
- Built: 1900
- Architectural style: Plain Traditional
- NRHP reference No.: 07000958
- Added to NRHP: September 19, 2007

The Bryant-Lasater House is a historic house at 770 North Main Street in Mulberry, Arkansas. It is a 1 1/2-story wood-frame structure, set on a foundation of molded concrete blocks, with a shallow-pitch pyramidal roof (pierced on each side by a hip-roof dormer), and a hip-roof porch extending across the front. A rear porch has been enclosed. Built c. 1900, the house is locally distinctive for its architecture, as a particularly large example of a pyramid-roofed house, and for its historical role as the home of a succession of locally prominent doctors, including Dr. O. J. Kirksey, who operated a maternity hospital in the house.

The house was listed on the National Register of Historic Places in 2007.

== See also ==
- National Register of Historic Places listings in Crawford County, Arkansas
