= Lee Creek Bridge (Van Buren, Arkansas) =

- U.S. National Register of Historic Places
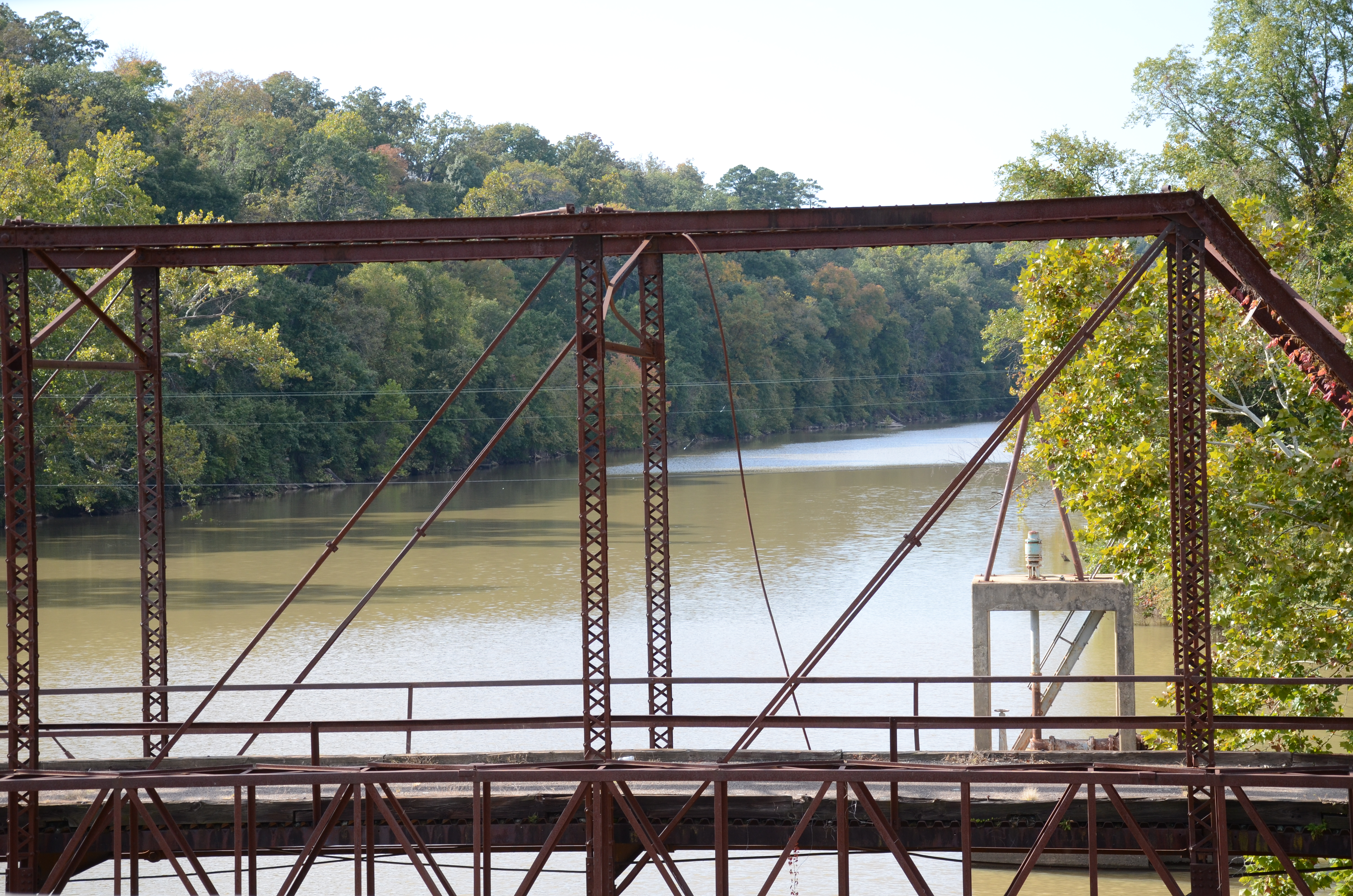

- Location within Arkansas Location within the United States
- Location: W. of W. Rena Rd. over Lee Creek, Van Buren, Arkansas
- Coordinates: 35°27′58″N 94°23′22″W
- Area: less than one acre
- Built: 1898
- Architectural style: Pratt through truss;Warren pony
- MPS: Historic Bridges of Arkansas MPS
- NRHP reference No.: 09001241
- Added to NRHP: January 21, 2010

The Lee Creek Bridge is a historic bridge across Lee Creek in Van Buren, Arkansas. Now closed to traffic, it is a three-span truss bridge located west of Rena Road on the city's west side. The bridge's single Pratt through truss was built in 1898, and a pair of Warren pony trusses were erected in 1930 to replace a second Pratt truss. The trusses rest on original stone piers. The bridge has a total length of 296 feet (90 m), of which 126 feet (38 m) is the Pratt truss. The bridge was bypassed and closed in 1995.

The bridge was listed on the National Register of Historic Places in 2010.

== See also ==
- Lee Creek Bridge (Natural Dam, Arkansas)
- National Register of Historic Places listings in Crawford County, Arkansas
- List of bridges on the National Register of Historic Places in Arkansas
