= Mount Olive United Methodist Church =

Historic church in Arkansas, United States

- U.S. National Register of Historic Places
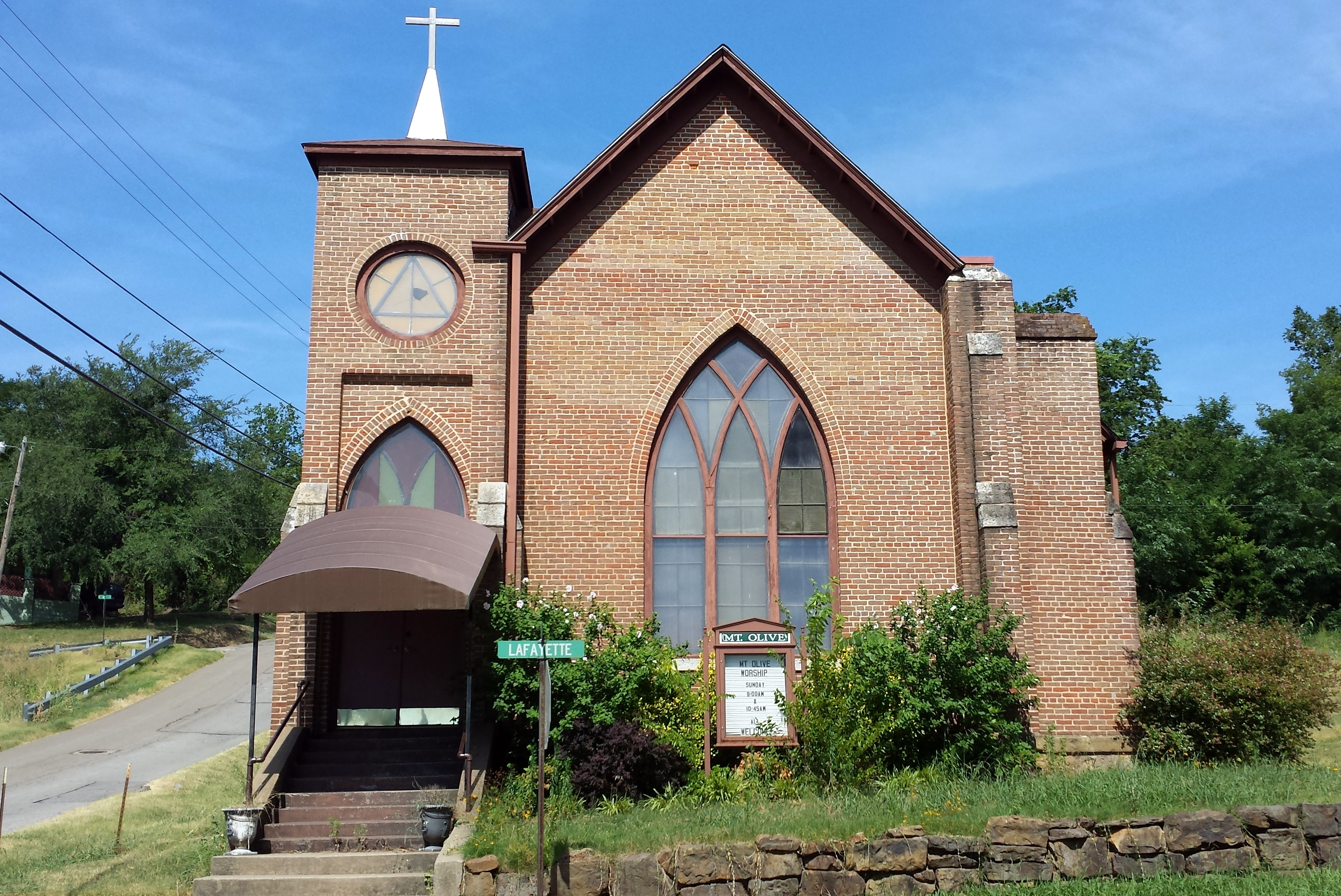

- Location within Arkansas Location within the United States
- Location: Lafayette and Knox Sts., Van Buren, Arkansas
- Coordinates: 35°26′13″N 94°21′18″W
- Area: 0 acres (0 ha)
- Built: 1889
- Architectural style: Late Gothic Revival
- NRHP reference No.: 76000401
- Added to NRHP: July 30, 1976

The Mount Olive United Methodist Church is a historic church at Lafayette and Knox Streets in Van Buren, Arkansas. It is a rectangular single-story brick structure with Gothic Revival styling. Its main facade has a large Gothic-arch window below the main roof gable, and a squat square tower to its left, housing the entrance in a Gothic-arched opening. The church was built in 1889 for a congregation that consisted of recently emancipated African-American former slaves when it was organized in 1869. It is a significant local landmark in its African-American culture and history.

The church was listed on the National Register of Historic Places in 1976. The congregation was closed by the United Methodist Church in 2004.

== See also ==
- National Register of Historic Places listings in Crawford County, Arkansas
