= Wilhauf House =

Historic house in Arkansas, United States

- U.S. National Register of Historic Places
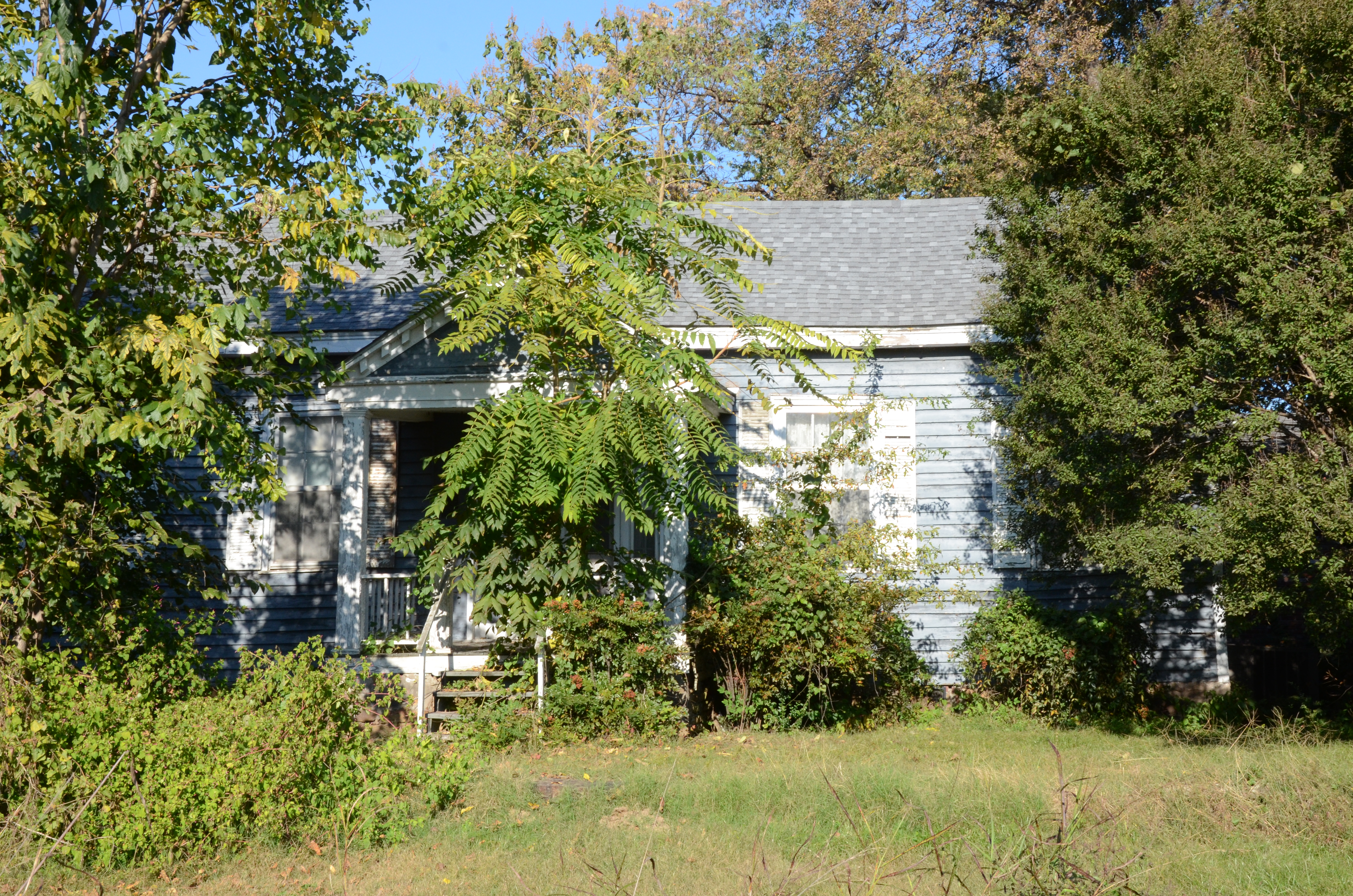

- Location within Arkansas Location within the United States
- Location: 109 N. 3rd St., Van Buren, Arkansas
- Coordinates: 35°26′5″N 94°21′28″W
- Area: less than one acre
- Built: 1838
- Architectural style: Greek Revival
- NRHP reference No.: 74000473
- Added to NRHP: August 27, 1974

The Wilhauf House is a historic house at 109 North 3rd Street in Van Buren, Arkansas. Built in 1838 and restyled in 1847, it is one of the oldest surviving buildings in the state. It is a single story log dog trot structure, consisting of two log pens originally joined by a breezeway (now closed in). The house is sheathed in weatherboard, and has a modest Greek Revival gabled portico. The 1847 alterations included the extension of the gable roof to accommodate additional rooms in the rear, which have been furthered extended by a modern addition. The house was built by Leonard Wilhauf on land he purchased from John Drennan, Van Buren's first proprietor.

The house was listed on the National Register of Historic Places in 1974.

== See also ==
- National Register of Historic Places listings in Crawford County, Arkansas
