= Dr. Charles Fox Brown House =

Historic house in Arkansas, United States

- U.S. National Register of Historic Places
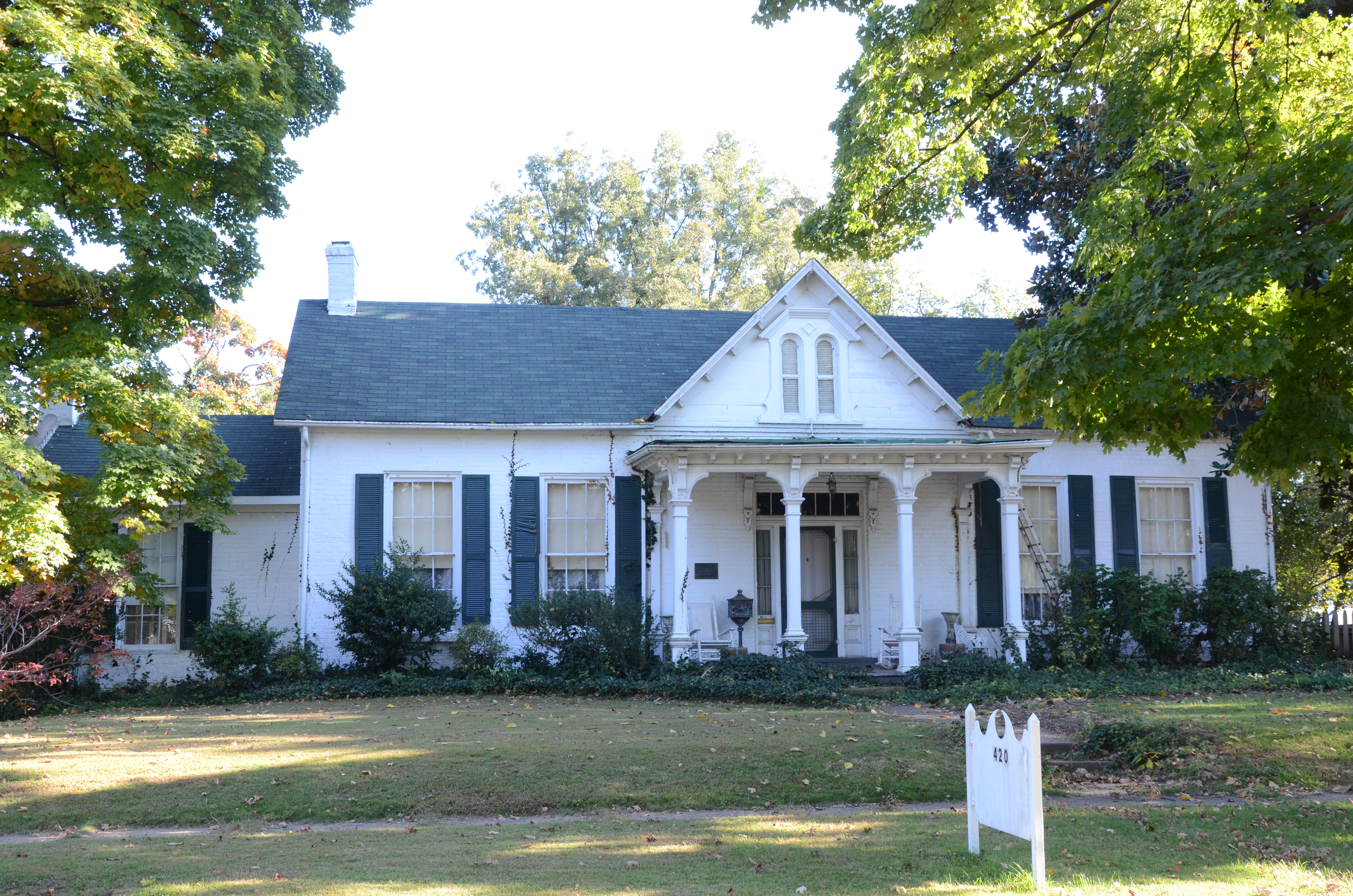

- Location within Arkansas Location within the United States
- Location: 420 Drennan St., Van Buren, Arkansas
- Coordinates: 35°25′58″N 94°21′0″W
- Area: less than one acre
- Built: 1867
- Architectural style: Greek Revival, Late Victorian
- NRHP reference No.: 78000583
- Added to NRHP: September 6, 1978

The Dr. Charles Fox Brown House is a historic house at 420 Drennan Street in Van Buren, Arkansas. It is a single-story brick structure, whose main block is five bays wide, with a small secondary block set back from the front at the left, and an ell extending to the rear. It has a side-gable roof, with a front-facing gable above the centered entrance, which is further sheltered by a flat-roof portico supported by four columns. The eaves are studded with brackets, and there are a pair of round-arch windows in the front-facing gable. The house was built in 1867 for Dr. Charles Fox Brown, and is unusual for the original 19th-century surgery, located in the secondary block. The house is stylistically a distinctive blend of Greek Revival and Italianate styles.

The house was listed on the National Register of Historic Places in 1978.

== See also ==
- National Register of Historic Places listings in Crawford County, Arkansas
