= Van Buren Women's Literary Club =

Historic church in Arkansas, United States

- Old School Presbyterian Church
- U.S. National Register of Historic Places
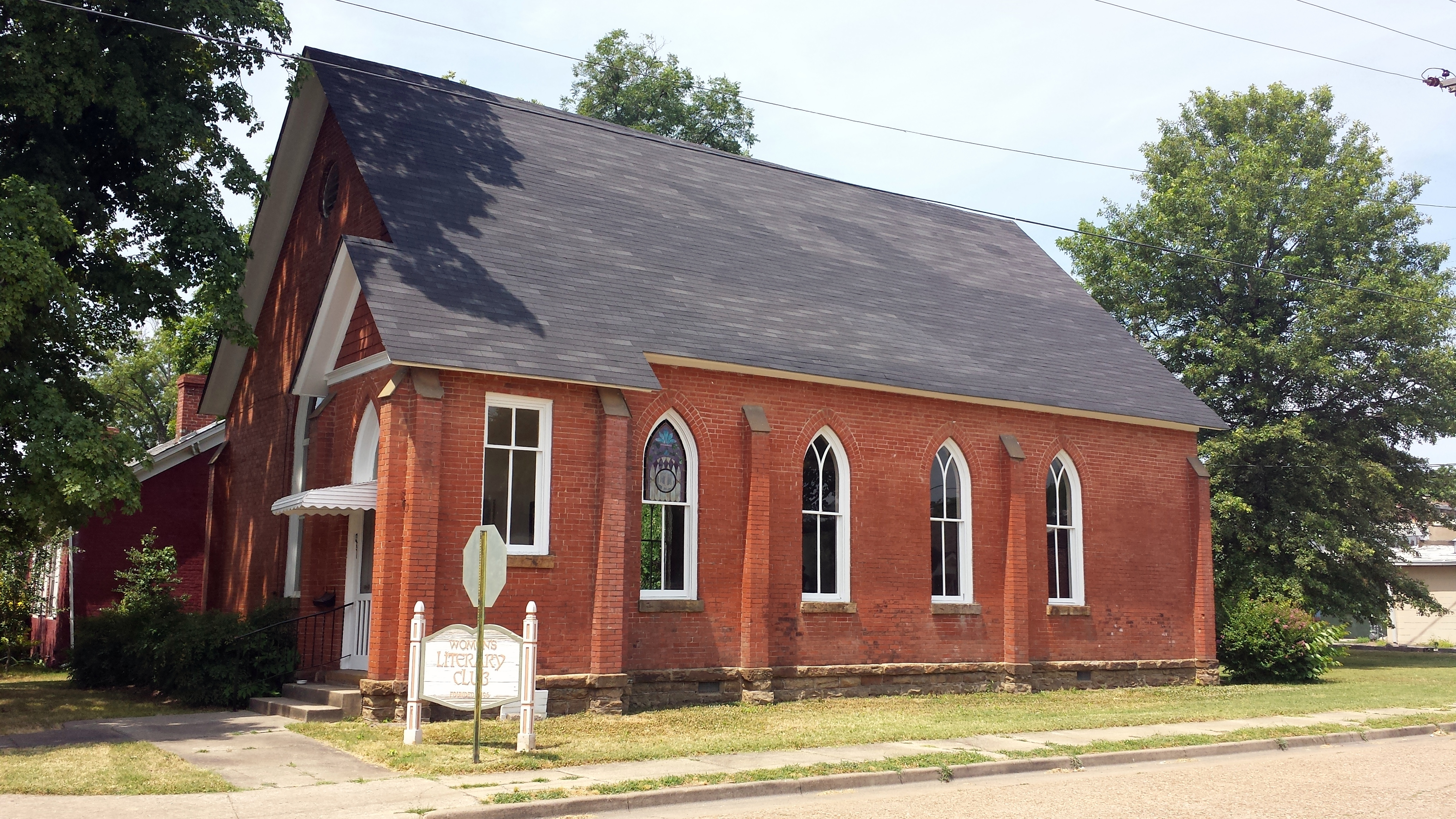

- Location within Arkansas Location within the United States
- Location: 421 Webster St., Van Buren, Arkansas
- Coordinates: 35°26′11″N 94°21′15″W
- Area: Less than 1 acre (0.40 ha)
- Built: 1903
- Architectural style: Gothic Revival
- NRHP reference No.: 09000740
- Added to NRHP: September 23, 2009

The Van Buren Women's Literary Club is one of the oldest surviving literary societies of its type in the nation, founded in 1896 to improve the education of its members by providing access to books. The society is located at 421 Webster Street in Van Buren, Arkansas, in a historic Presbyterian church building built in 1903 on the foundations of the 1844 Old School Presbyterian Church. The building is a vernacular brick building with Late Gothic Revival features, supposedly designed by Reverend Finney, the pastor of the local Baptist church. The building was used as a church until 1919, when the Old School Church merged with other Presbyterian congregations. After serving briefly as the meeting house for a chapter of the Loyal Order of Moose, a fraternal organization, it was acquired by the Literary Club in 1921, and served as Van Buren's library until the 1970s. Although Van Buren now has a separate public library, the society maintains a small library on the premises.

The society's building was listed on the National Register of Historic Places in 2009.
