= Natural Dam, Arkansas =

- Unincorporated community
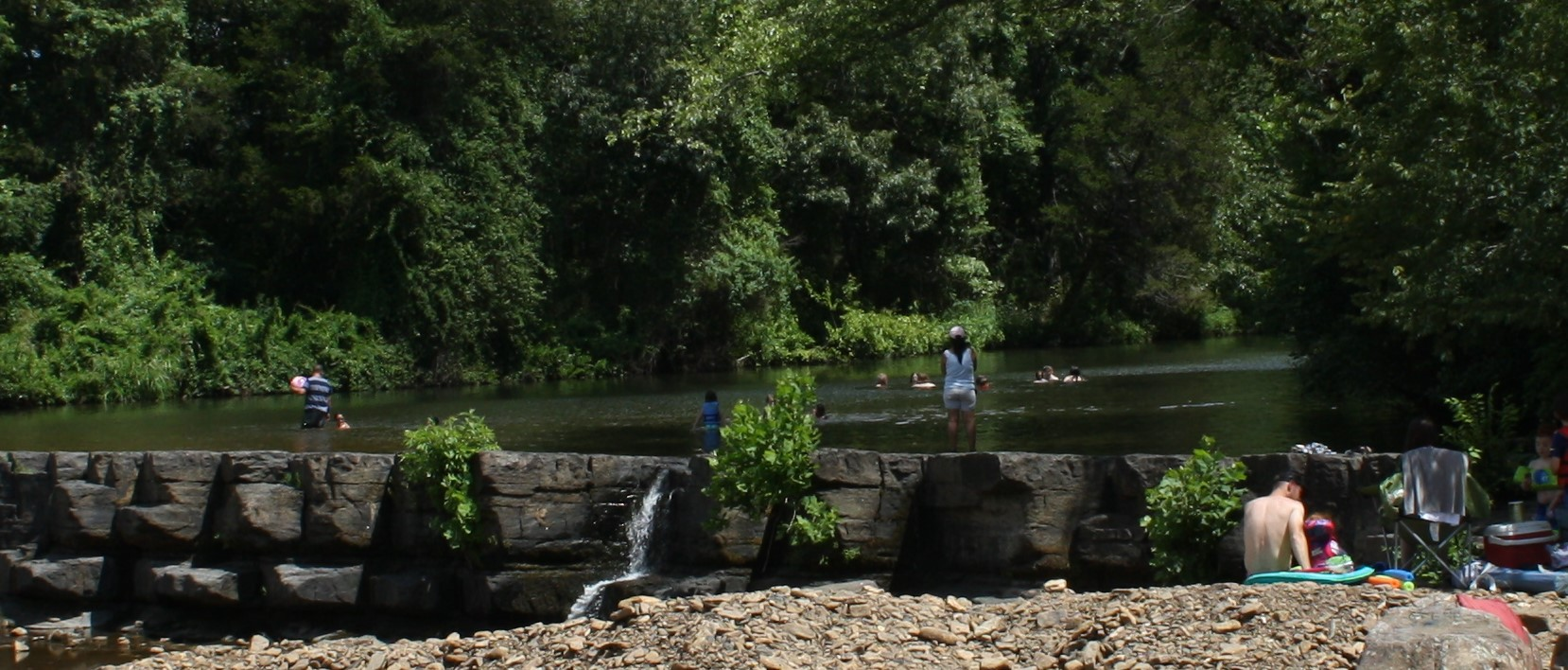
- Lee Creek and the Natural Dam

- Location within Arkansas Location within the United States
- Coordinates: 35°38′55″N 94°23′41″W
- Country: United States
- State: Arkansas
- County: Crawford
- Elevation: 663 ft (202 m)
- Time zone: UTC-6 (Central (CST))
  - Summer (DST): UTC-5 (CDT)
- ZIP code: 72948
- Area code: 479
- GNIS feature ID: 72836

Natural Dam is an unincorporated community in Crawford County, Arkansas, United States. Natural Dam is located on Arkansas Highway 59, 6 miles (9.7 km) north-northwest of Cedarville. Natural Dam has a post office with ZIP code 72948. The now-replaced Lee Creek Bridge, which was listed on the National Register of Historic Places, was located in the community.

The community was named for a natural dam near the original town site.

== Notable person ==
- Shay Mooney, half of country duo Dan + Shay
