= Cedarville School District =

School district in Arkansas, United States

Address
- 9500 Pirates Point Cedarville, Arkansas, 72932; United States

District information
- Type: Public
- Grades: K–12
- NCES District ID: 0504080

Students and staff
- Students: 743
- Teachers: 85.4
- Staff: 74.0
- Student–teacher ratio: 8.7

Other information
- Website: www.cedarvilleschools.org

Cedarville School District 44 is a school district in Crawford County, Arkansas.

== Schools ==
The District includes:

- Cedarville Elementary School
- Cedarville Middle School
- Cedarville High School
