= Cedarville, Arkansas =

- City
- Location of Cedarville in Crawford County, Arkansas.
- Coordinates: 35°34′59″N 94°21′42″W
- Country: United States
- State: Arkansas
- County: Crawford

Area
  - Total: 8.88 sq mi (23.01 km^{2})
  - Land: 8.88 sq mi (23.01 km^{2})
  - Water: 0 sq mi (0.00 km^{2})
- Elevation: 860 ft (260 m)

Population (2020)
  - Total: 1,424
  - Estimate (2025): 1,458 ▲
  - Density: 160.3/sq mi (61.88/km^{2})
- Time zone: UTC-6 (Central (CST))
  - Summer (DST): UTC-5 (CDT)
- ZIP code: 72932
- Area code: 479
- FIPS code: 05-12520
- GNIS feature ID: 2404016
- Website: cedarvillear.gov

Cedarville is a city in Crawford County, Arkansas, United States. It is part of the Fort Smith, Arkansas-Oklahoma Metropolitan Statistical Area. The population was 1,410 at the 2020 census.

== History ==
Cedarville was platted in 1879. A post office has been in operation at Cedarville since 1872.

== Geography ==
Cedarville is located in western Crawford County on the southern edge of Ozark National Forest. Arkansas Highway 59 runs through the city, leading north 36 miles (58 km) towards Lincoln and south 10 miles (16 km) to Van Buren, the Crawford County seat.

According to the United States Census Bureau, Cedarville has a total area of 9.0 square miles (23.3 km^{2}), all land.

== Demographics ==
Historical population
Census	Pop.	Note	%±
1930	58		—
1940	111		91.4%
1950	43		−61.3%
1960	52		20.9%
2000	1,133		—
2010	1,394		23.0%
2020	1,424		2.2%
2025 (est.)	1,458	▲	2.4%
U.S. Decennial Census

=== 2020 census ===
As of the 2020 census, Cedarville had a population of 1,424. The median age was 42.0 years. 23.9% of residents were under the age of 18 and 17.0% of residents were 65 years of age or older. For every 100 females there were 91.4 males, and for every 100 females age 18 and over there were 94.4 males age 18 and over.

0.0% of residents lived in urban areas, while 100.0% lived in rural areas.

There were 524 households in Cedarville, of which 35.1% had children under the age of 18 living in them. Of all households, 56.5% were married-couple households, 17.4% were households with a male householder and no spouse or partner present, and 19.8% were households with a female householder and no spouse or partner present. About 19.3% of all households were made up of individuals and 9.7% had someone living alone who was 65 years of age or older.

There were 574 housing units, of which 8.7% were vacant. The homeowner vacancy rate was 2.2% and the rental vacancy rate was 8.2%.

Racial composition as of the 2020 census
Race	Number	Percent
White	1,188	83.4%
Black or African American	6	0.4%
American Indian and Alaska Native	31	2.2%
Asian	4	0.3%
Native Hawaiian and Other Pacific Islander	1	0.1%
Some other race	22	1.5%
Two or more races	172	12.1%
Hispanic or Latino (of any race)	53	3.7%

=== 2000 census ===
As of the census of 2000, there were 1,133 people, 406 households, and 328 families residing in the city. The population density was 129.1 inhabitants per square mile (49.8/km^{2}). There were 442 housing units at an average density of 50.3 per square mile (19.4/km^{2}). The racial makeup of the city was 94.53% White, 0.18% Black or African American, 2.74% Native American, 0.26% Asian, 0.18% from other races, and 2.12% from two or more races. 0.97% of the population were Hispanic or Latino of any race.

There were 407 households, out of which 39.9% had children under the age of 18 living with them, 68.0% were married couples living together, 9.6% had a female householder with no husband present, and 19.0% were non-families. 15.8% of all households were made up of individuals, and 5.3% had someone living alone who was 65 years of age or older. The average household size was 2.79 and the average family size was 3.10.

In the city, the population was spread out, with 29.3% under the age of 18, 7.9% from 18 to 24, 32.1% from 25 to 44, 22.6% from 45 to 64, and 8.1% who were 65 years of age or older. The median age was 33 years. For every 100 females, there were 105.6 males. For every 100 females age 18 and over, there were 99.3 males.

=== Income and poverty ===
The median income for a household in the city was $30,952, and the median income for a family was $33,409. Males had a median income of $30,385 versus $16,538 for females. The per capita income for the city was $14,346. About 10.7% of families and 15.8% of the population were below the poverty line, including 19.9% of those under age 18 and 19.4% of those age 65 or over.

=== Demographic estimates ===
The median gross rent was $750/mo (2011) and estimated rent burden was 19.0%.

== Education ==
Public education for early childhood, elementary and secondary school students is primarily provided by the Cedarville School District, which leads to graduation from Cedarville High School. The school's mascot and athletic emblem is the Pirates with royal blue and gold as the school colors.

== Notable person ==
- Ruth Whitaker, Arkansas State Senator, lived in Cedarville.
