= Chester, Arkansas =

- Town
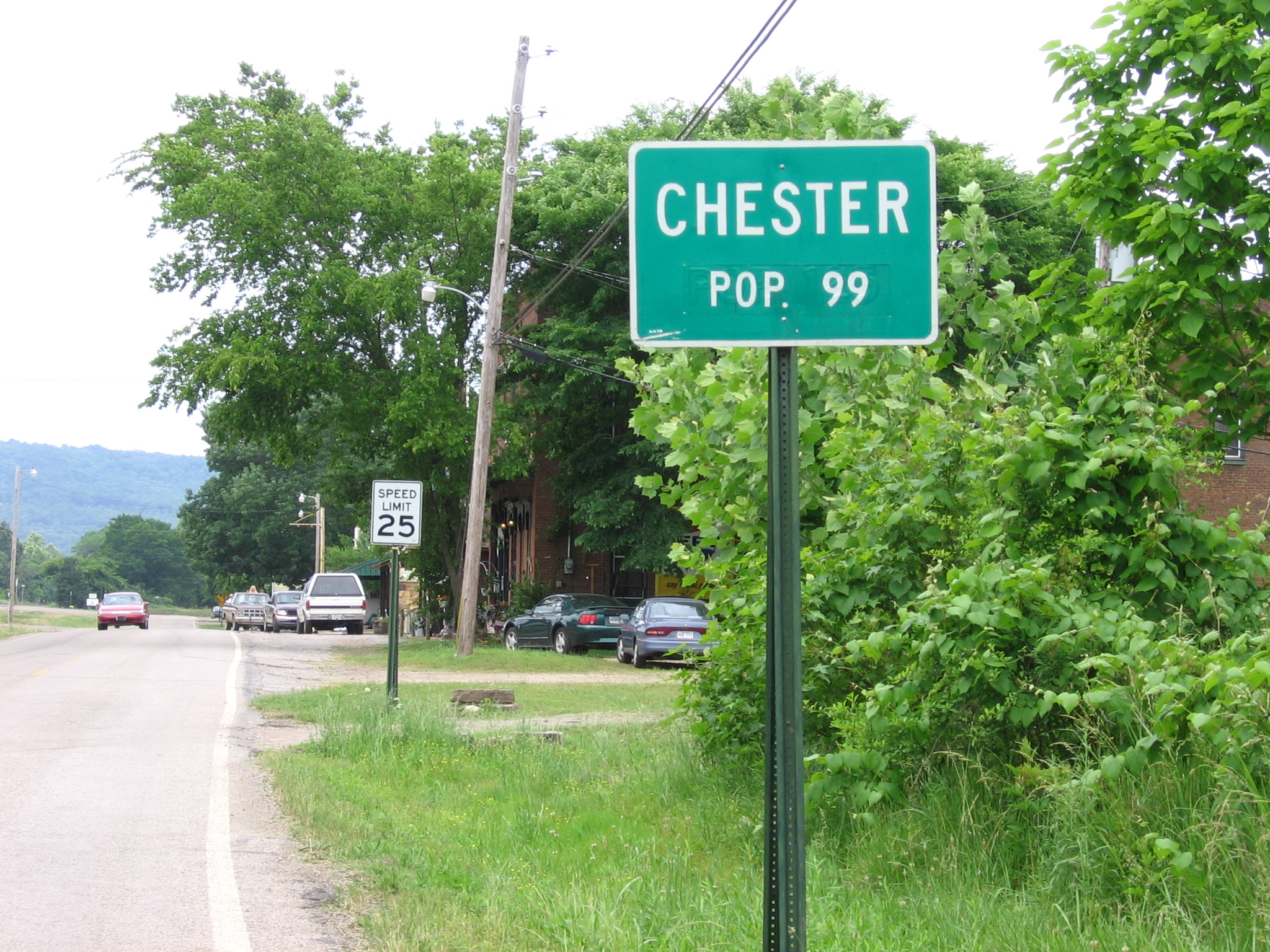
- Entrance sign to Chester

- Location of Chester in Crawford County, Arkansas.
- Coordinates: 35°40′40″N 94°10′40″W
- Country: United States
- State: Arkansas
- County: Crawford
- Named for: Chester, England

Area
  - Total: 0.51 sq mi (1.32 km^{2})
  - Land: 0.51 sq mi (1.32 km^{2})
  - Water: 0 sq mi (0.00 km^{2})
- Elevation: 883 ft (269 m)

Population (2020)
  - Total: 144
  - Estimate (2025): 149 ▲
  - Density: 282.6/sq mi (109.11/km^{2})
- Time zone: UTC-6 (Central (CST))
  - Summer (DST): UTC-5 (CDT)
- ZIP code: 72934
- Area code: 479
- FIPS code: 05-13570
- GNIS feature ID: 2406263
- Website: chesterar.gov

Chester is a town in Crawford County, Arkansas, United States. It is part of the Fort Smith, Arkansas-Oklahoma Metropolitan Statistical Area. As of the 2020 Census the population was 144.

== History ==
Chester was platted in 1887 when the railroad was extended to that point. A post office called Chester has been in operation since 1883.

== Geography ==
According to the United States Census Bureau, the town has a total area of 1.3 km^{2} (0.50 sq mi), all land.

== Demographics ==
Historical population
Census	Pop.	Note	%±
1890	222		—
1900	174		−21.6%
1910	162		−6.9%
1920	223		37.7%
1930	196		−12.1%
1940	207		5.6%
1950	120		−42.0%
1960	99		−17.5%
1970	82		−17.2%
1980	139		69.5%
1990	125		−10.1%
2000	99		−20.8%
2010	159		60.6%
2020	144		−9.4%
2025 (est.)	149	▲	3.5%
U.S. Decennial Census; 2014 Estimate

As of the census of 2000, there were 99 people, 35 households, and 26 families residing in the town. The population density was 76.4 people/km^{2} (198 people/mi^{2}). There were 46 housing units at an average density of 35.5 units/km^{2} (92 units/mi^{2}). The racial makeup of the town was 89.90% White and 10.10% Native American. 2.02% of the population were Hispanic or Latino of any race.

There were 35 households, out of which 34.3% had children under the age of 18 living with them, 48.6% were married couples living together, 20.0% had a female householder with no husband present, and 25.7% were non-families. 14.3% of all households were made up of individuals, and 2.9% had someone living alone who was 65 years of age or older. The average household size was 2.83 and the average family size was 3.15.

In the town, the population was spread out, with 31.3% under the age of 18, 8.1% from 18 to 24, 28.3% from 25 to 44, 20.2% from 45 to 64, and 12.1% who were 65 years of age or older. The median age was 31 years. For every 100 females, there were 83.3 males. For every 100 females age 18 and over, there were 88.9 males.

The median income for a household in the town was $27,500, and the median income for a family was $31,667. Males had a median income of $26,250 versus $14,583 for females. The per capita income for the town was $11,269. There were 23.1% of families and 38.9% of the population living below the poverty line, including 48.6% of under eighteens and 25.0% of those over 64.

== Notable people ==
Country music singer Royal Wade Kimes is a native of Chester.

Racing driver A. J. Shepherd was born in Chester.
