= John Manning Jr. =

American politician

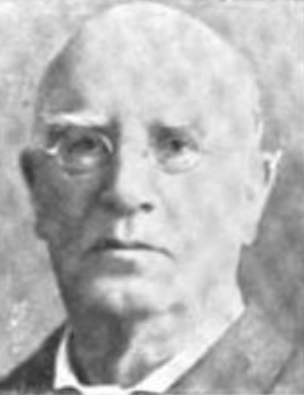

Member of the North Carolina House of Representatives
- In office 1881

Member of the United States House of Representatives
- In office December 7, 1870 – March 3, 1871
- Constituency: Fourth District

Personal details
- Born: July 30, 1830 Edenton, North Carolina
- Died: February 12, 1899 (aged 68) Chapel Hill, North Carolina
- Party: Democratic
- Education: University of North Carolina at Chapel Hill
- Occupation: Lawyer, politician

John Manning Jr. (July 30, 1830 – February 12, 1899) was a North Carolina politician who briefly served in the United States House of Representatives in 1870 and 1871.

== Biography ==
Manning was born in Edenton, Chowan County, North Carolina on July 30, 1830. He graduated from the University of North Carolina at Chapel Hill in 1850; studied law; was admitted to the bar in 1853 and commenced practice in Pittsboro.

Manning was a delegate to the state convention in 1861 which seceded from the union, and then served in the North Carolina Volunteers throughout the American Civil War. He was elected over Joseph W. Holden on November 26, 1870 as a Democrat (then called "Conservative" in North Carolina) to the Forty-first Congress to fill the vacancy caused by the resignation of John T. Deweese. The November special election was actually the second special election for the Fourth Congressional District seat that year; Robert B. Gilliam had been elected to fill the seat in a special election in August 1870 but had died shortly thereafter, before taking his seat. Meanwhile, Sion Hart Rogers had been elected to the 42nd Congress from the Fourth District, also in August. Manning served only the few remaining months of the 41st Congress, from December 7, 1870, to March 3, 1871.

Later, Manning was a member of the State constitutional convention in 1875; a member of the State house of representatives in 1881; and a commissioner to codify the laws of the State in 1881. He became a professor of law at his alma mater, the University of North Carolina, and was also a member of its board of trustees from 1881 to 1899. Manning died in Chapel Hill, N.C., on February 12, 1899.

He was father of James S. Manning, the future North Carolina Attorney General and grandfather of lawyer and future Adjutant General of North Carolina, John H. Manning.

U.S. House of Representatives
Preceded by Robert B. Gilliam; Elect	Member of the U.S. House of Representatives from North Carolina's 4th congressional district 1870–1871	Succeeded by Sion H. Rogers
