= 1870 North Carolina's 4th congressional district special election =

A special election to the United States House of Representatives for North Carolina's 4th congressional district was held August 4, 1870.

The winning candidate would serve in the United States House of Representatives to represent North Carolina in the 41st Congress until the general election on November 26, 1870.

== Background ==
Incumbent U.S. Representative John T. Deweese resigned his seat on February 28, 1870, before he was censured by the House of Representatives on March 1, 1870, for selling an appointment to the Naval Academy. A special election was held to replace his seat.

== Candidates ==
=== Conservative ===
==== Nominee ====
- Robert B. Gilliam, state representative and speaker of the North Carolina house (Also identified as a Democrat)

=== Republican ===
==== Nominee ====
- Madison Hawkins, politician who later became the Chief of the US Census Bureau in northeastern NC (1890)

== General election ==
1870 North Carolina's 4th congressional district special election
Party	Candidate	Votes	%	±%
Conservative Party (North Carolina)	Robert B. Gilliam	14,014	50.83%	+3.02%
Republican	Madison Hawkins	13,556	49.17%	−3.02%
Majority		458	1.66%	+2.71%
Turnout		27,570	100.00%	
Conservative Party (North Carolina) gain from Republican				

== Aftermath ==
Representative-elect Robert B. Gilliam, died before taking office, necessitating the November 26 special election.

== See also ==
- United States House of Representatives elections, 1866
- United States House of Representatives elections, 1868
