= King Opera House =

Opera house in Arkansas, USA

- U.S. Historic district – Contributing property
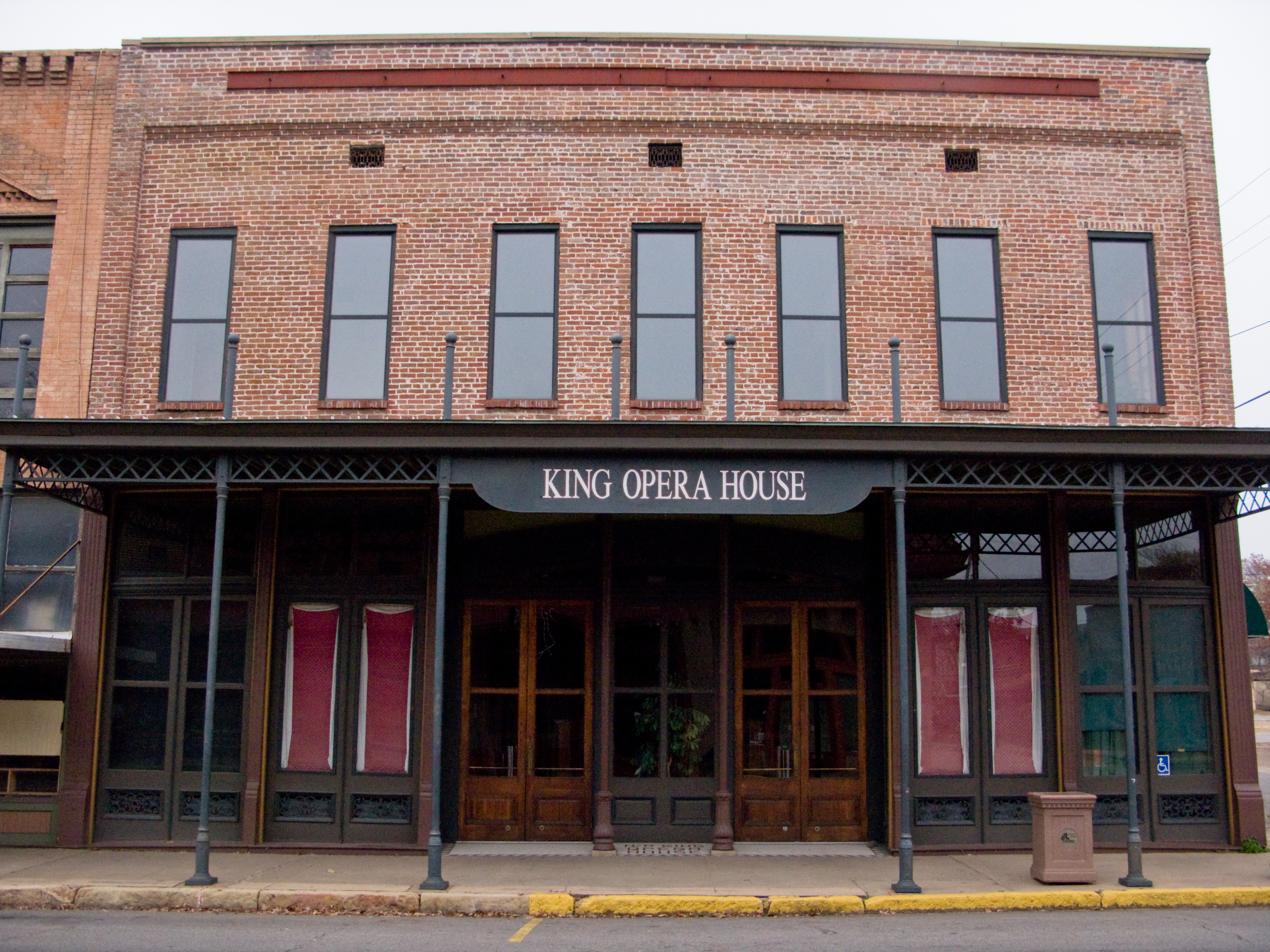
- King Opera House, 2007

- Location within Arkansas Location within the United States
- Location: 427 Main Street; Van Buren, Arkansas,
- Coordinates: 35.436547°N 94.341359°W
- Built: 1880
- Architectural style: Victorian
- Part of: Van Buren Historic District (ID76000402)

The King Opera House is a performance hall located on Van Buren, Arkansas's Main Street. Since it was built in the late 19th century, the opera house's stage has hosted many plays and performers. The King Opera House is a contributing property to the Van Buren Historic District, listed on the National Register of Historic Places.

== History ==
The Victorian-era structure first opened its doors in 1891. The ground floor was used partly as the Willard Billiard Parlor and the other half was the Wallace Saloon and Restaurant. The second floor was home to the Van Buren Press newspaper. This structure was at the time known as the "Wallace Block". In 1898, the building was purchased by Col. Henry P. King. On February 3rd, 1901, it was announced the building would be transformed into an opera house. Small storefronts remained at the front of the building, but the opera house was soon finished later that same year. The first show to be put on would be "Faust" on October 18th, 1901. The opera house would remain busy, hosting many different types of acts and sermons until 1914.

On March 14th, 1914, a fire began in a dry-cleaning storefront. The flames took over the opera house and damaged the entire interior. Despite the damage, vaudeville acts remained booked. On November 11th, 1914, it was announced the opera house would be renovated into a moving picture house. In February 1919, the remodel was finished and the doors opened as the Van Buren Theater. June 3rd, 1919, Joe Huff bought the building. In April 1920, he announced it would undergo another remodel.

By the 1930's, the building was renamed to be the Bob Burn's Theater after the famous actor and radio star of Van Buren. The front of the building remained a storefront with the top floor being an apartment. In the 1960's, Malco Theaters bought the property, but retained the name as the Bob Burn's Theater. It closed in 1974.

In 1979 it was purchased by the City of Van Buren Community Development Agency and restored to the King Opera House. Many areas of the interior, including structural beams, still retained fire damage. Much of the restoration done during this time can still be seen today. The project took place until 1991.

The City of Van Buren operated the building until 2022, when they turned over management to Arts on Main (the arts-centered nonprofit next to the building).

The auditorium of the opera house has 218 seats on the ground level, with about 96 seats in the balcony; all seats on the ground floor have an intricate, period-correct design. Built to accommodate large and well-sized performances on its stage, the opera house's basement, in contrast, has two small dressing rooms and two closets. The basement can be highly cramped in its relatively modest changing area and green room, particularly for productions with large casts.

The stage measures 28 feet wide from curtain to curtain, has a depth of 26.5 feet, and a baton height of 20 feet.

== Hauntings ==
The King Opera house has been reported to be haunted by staff and many citizens of Van Buren. The main haunting is that of Charles Tolson. Charles C. Tolson was born on December 25th, 1868 in Mississippi. He was the manager of a stock company and a vaudeville actor. During his time as an actor, he performed at the King Opera House. After one such performance, the daughter of practitioner Dr. William Parchman reportedly went up to Tolson to speak with him about the show. A friend told Parchman his daughter and Tolson were flirting with each other during this conversation. One night while Tolson was waiting for his train at the depot, Dr. Parchman shot him multiple times.

There was also a Paranormal Documentary made in 2023 directed by trailblazing film-maker and Arkansas native Gavin Webb. It goes into the history of the Opera house and how it came to be so haunted. Even talking about the days before it was the famous "King Opera House" and shows that a lady in white appears in the men's restroom asking for her husband then disappears. This film was titled "The King Opera House: A Paranormal Documentary" and can be found on Amazon Prime Video.
