= Van Buren Confederate Monument =

Coordinates: 35°26′3″N 94°21′20.4″W

- U.S. National Register of Historic Places
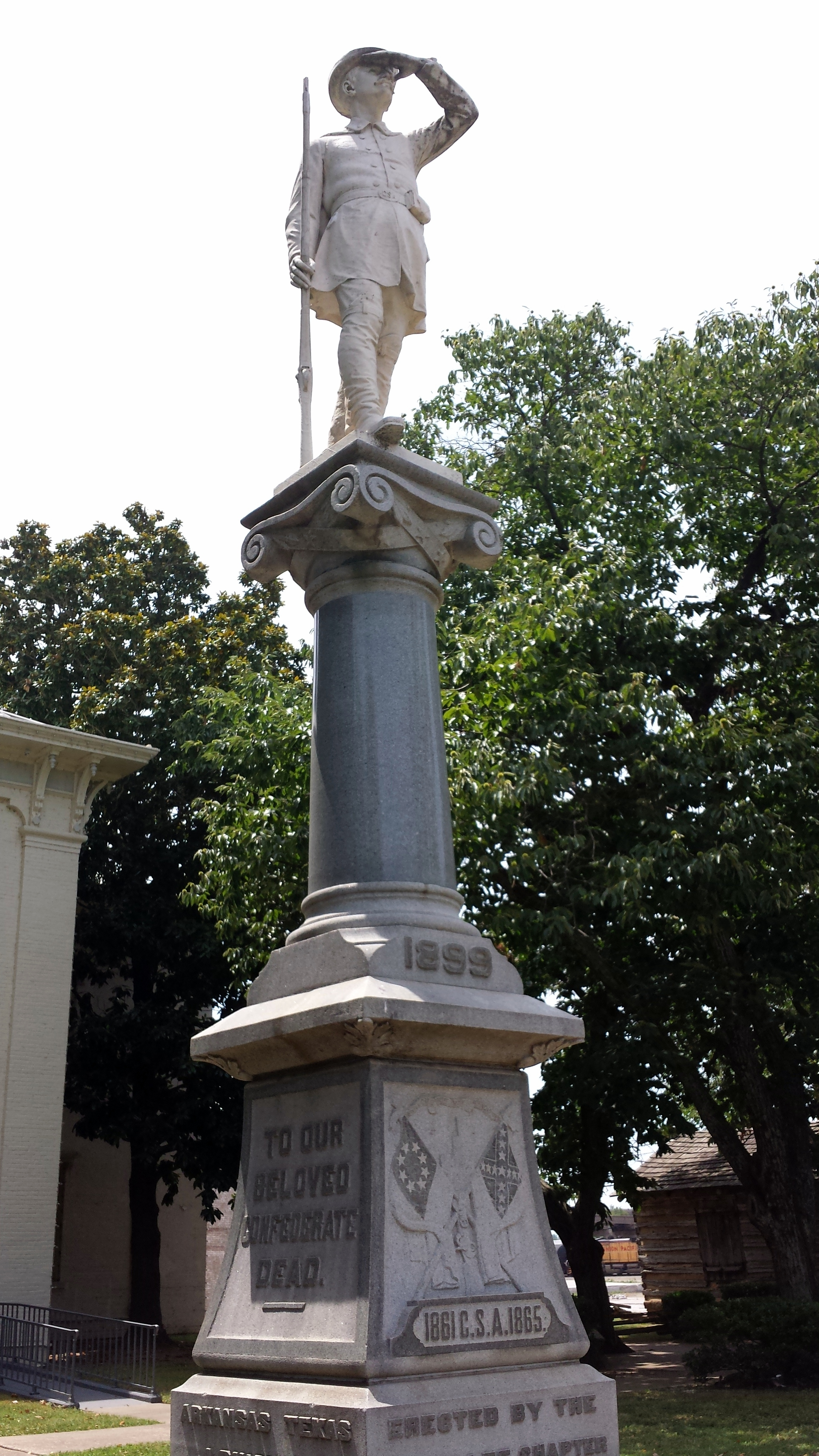
- Interactive map of Van Buren Confederate Monument
- Location: Courthouse Lawn, Van Buren, Arkansas
- Built: 1899
- Architectural style: Classical Revival
- MPS: Civil War Commemorative Sculpture MPS
- NRHP reference No.: 96000461
- Added to NRHP: April 26, 1996

The Van Buren Confederate Monument is located in front of the Crawford County Courthouse in Van Buren, Arkansas. Built in 1899 by the Mary Lee Chapter of the United Daughters of the Confederacy, the structure was initially erected in Fairview Cemetery. Honoring Confederate dead from the Battle of Pea Ridge, Battle of Prairie Grove, and the Battle of Wilson's Creek, the Sons of the Confederacy requested the memorial be relocated to the courthouse lawn in 1906, and it has remained there ever since. The monument was listed on the National Register of Historic Places in 1996 as part of the Civil War Commemorative Sculpture Multiple Property Submission.

== See also ==
- 1899 in art
- List of Confederate monuments and memorials
- Van Buren Historic District
