= Attorney General Manning =

Attorney General Manning may refer to:

- Henry Manning (politician) (1877–1963), Attorney General of New South Wales
- James S. Manning (1859–1938), Attorney General of North Carolina
- William Montagu Manning (1811–1895), Attorney General of New South Wales
