= Van Buren School District =

School district in Arkansas, United States

The Van Buren School District logo with its motto "Every Child--Whatever it Takes."

Van Buren School District (VBSD) is located in Van Buren, Arkansas. As of the 2005–6 school year, there were 5,932 students enrolled and employed over 600 regular employees and over 100 substitute employees.

== History ==
Merle Dickerson served as the superintendent until her June 2014 resignation; Kerry Schneider therefore became interim superintendent.

Harold Jeffcoat is the current (2026) superintendent.

== Schools ==
As of 2015, VBSD had six elementary schools (K-5), two middle schools (6–8), one junior high schools (9) and one high school (10–12).

=== High schools ===
- Van Buren High School

=== Junior High/Middle Schools ===
- Northridge Middle School
- Butterfield Trail Middle School
- Freshman Academy

=== Elementary schools ===
- Rena Elementary School
- King Elementary School
- JJ Izard Elementary School
- Parkview Elementary School
- James R. Tate Elementary School
- Oliver Springs Elementary School
- Central Elementary School

=== Alternative Learning Center ===
- Edward F. Thicksten Center for Learning

== Statistics ==
According to the Annual Statistical Report for 2002–3 released by the Arkansas Department of Education, the VBSD covered approximately 110 square miles (280 km^{2}). Its Average Daily Attendance (ADA) was 5,162.25 students which had increased by 3.1% over the previous 5 years. It transported an average of 3,706.37 students via the bus system. It was assessed at $260,015,517 with a district debt of $19,189,387 and a borrowing power of $51,014,803.

== Human resources ==
The Van Buren School District is one of the largest employers in the city of Van Buren employing over 600 regular employees and over 100 substitute employees.

- There are 443 certified/licensed employees. These include teachers and other support professionals such as guidance counselors, school nurses, media specialists, etc.
- The 201 support staff employees are employees of instructional support services, auxiliary services support and administrative support.
- There are also 16 principals and assistant principals and five central office administrators.

== Sources ==
- Annual Statistical Report 2002-2003
- Certified Salary Schedule 2006-2007
- VBSD District Information
