= Rogers-Bagley-Daniels-Pegues House =

Historic house in North Carolina, United States

- U.S. National Register of Historic Places
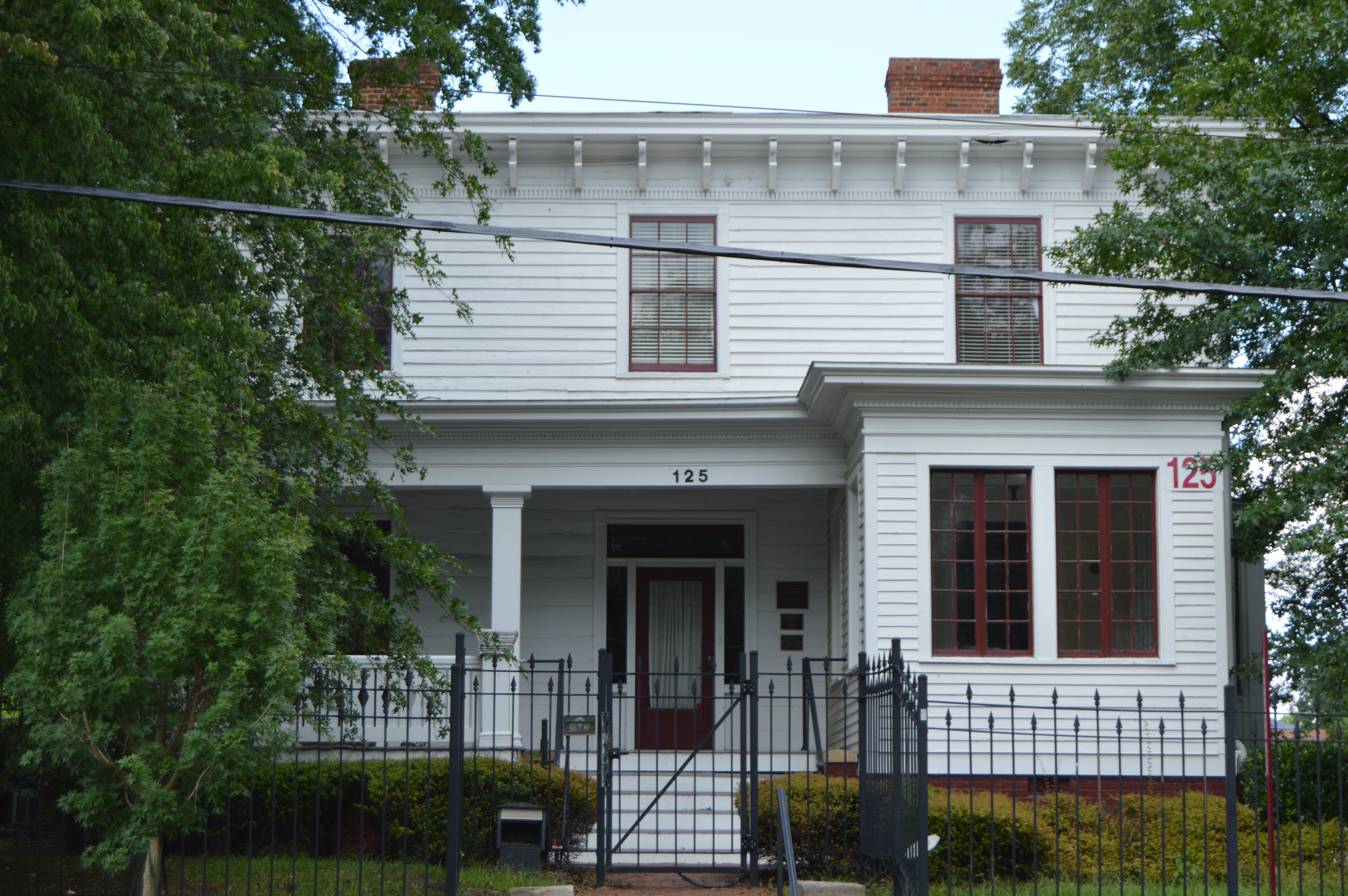
- Front

- Location within North Carolina Location within the United States
- Location: 125 E. South St., Raleigh, North Carolina
- Coordinates: 35°46′19″N 78°38′15″W
- Area: less than one acre
- Built: c. 1855
- Architectural style: Greek Revival, Italianate
- NRHP reference No.: 79001759
- Added to NRHP: March 21, 1979

Rogers-Bagley-Daniels-Pegues House is a historic home located at Raleigh, Wake County, North Carolina. It was built about 1855, and is a two-story, three bay by two bay, Greek Revival-style frame dwelling with a low hipped roof and Italianate-style accents. It has a hip roofed porch with Doric order posts and bay windows. It was built by Sion Hart Rogers (1825-1874), a Congressman from and Attorney General of North Carolina. It was the home of Josephus Daniels (1862-1948) from about 1894 to 1913.

It was listed on the National Register of Historic Places in 1979.
