= Van Buren High School (Van Buren, Arkansas) =

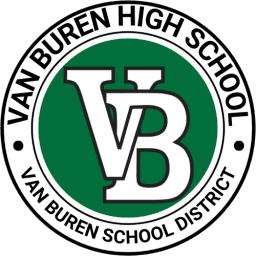

Location
- 2001 East Pointer Trail; Van Buren, Arkansas; United States; 35°27′33″N 94°20′13″W

Information
- Type: Public
- Motto: Every Child, Whatever It Takes!
- Established: 1908 (118 years ago)
- School district: Van Buren School District
- CEEB code: 042500
- NCES School ID: 051341001103
- Principal: Chris Bryant
- Faculty: 121.47 (on FTE basis)
- Grades: 10-12
- Enrollment: 1,228 (2023-2024)
- Student to teacher ratio: 10.11
- Colors: Kelly green and white
- Athletics conference: 5A West
- Mascot: Pointer
- Team name: Van Buren Pointers
- Rival: Alma High School
- Website: www.vbsd.us/schools/van-buren-high-school

Van Buren High School is a comprehensive public high school serving students in grades 10 through 12 in Van Buren, Arkansas, United States. It is the sole high school administered by the Van Buren School District.

== History ==
The school underwent a major development project that was finished in 2009. The project added a number of new classrooms, a new basketball facility (Clair Bates Arena), and a 1,500 seat concert and performing arts center, known as the Van Buren Fine Arts Center.

== Curriculum ==
The assumed course of study at Van Buren High School exceeds the Smart Core curriculum developed by the Arkansas Department of Education (ADE). Students engage in regular and Advanced Placement (AP) coursework and exams to obtain at least 24 units beyond the 22 units required by the Smart Core curriculum. The Van Buren School District offers students a Smart Core diploma, a College Prep diploma, a College Prep with Honors diploma, and a College Prep with High Honors diploma, each based on certain coursework and grade point average requirements. Exceptional students have been recognized as National Merit Finalists and participated in Arkansas Governor's School.

The school maintains a concurrent credit partnership with the University of Arkansas – Fort Smith, Arkansas Tech University, Western Arkansas Technical Center, and Northwest Arkansas Community College, whereas students may receive concurrent high school and college credit.

== Band and Music ==
The Pointer Pride Marching Band has won several marching contests, including Broken Arrow Invitational Grand Champions in 2010.

The Arkansas School Band and Orchestra Association (ASBOA) held its first state marching contest in 2016. The results of the Van Buren Marching Band are as follows:

Arkansas State Marching Results
Year	Class	Placement
2016	AAAAA (5A)	Did not compete
2017	AAAAA (5A)	1st
ASBOA added 6A and 7A as new classes in 2018.
2018	7A	1st
2019	7A	2nd
2020	6A	1st
2021	6A	1st
2022	6A	1st
2023	6A	2nd
2024	6A	2nd
2025	6A	2nd
2026	6A	1st

ASBOA began holding its state concert contests in 2022. The results of the school's top concert band are as follows:

Arkansas State Concert Results
Year	Class	Placement
2022	6A	Did not compete
2023	6A	2nd
2024	6A	2nd
2025	6A	Did not compete
2026	6A	2nd

== Athletics ==
The school's mascot is the Pointer (hunting dog), and its school colors are kelly green and white.

For 2012-17, the Van Buren Pointers compete in the state's largest classification (7A) And in 2018 will compete in the state's second-largest classification (6A) within the 7A/6A Central Conference of the Arkansas Activities Association (AAA). The Pointers engage in numerous interscholastic activities, including baseball, basketball (boys/girls), cross country (boys/girls), football, golf, track, soccer, softball, tennis (boys/girls), and volleyball, along with marching band, cheer, and dance. Other extracurricular activities include a journalism department that produces the student newspaper and yearbook, choir, and drama.

The Van Buren High School Pointers have won several state and conference championships in multiple sports:

- Boys Wrestling State Champions (5x): 2022, 2023, 2024, 2025, 2026
- Boys Wrestling Dual State Champions (4x): 2022, 2023, 2024, 2026
- Football State Champions (4x): 1912, 1930, 1977, 1996
- Bowling State Champions (2x): 2010, 2020
- Girls Cross Country State Champions (1x): 2010
- Boys Basketball State Champions (1x): 1950
- Girls Basketball State Champions (5x): 1950, 1951, 1953, 1954, 1955
- Boys Golf State Champions (2x): 1970, 1976
- Competitive Cheer State Champions (2x AAA): 2006, 2007, 2008 (girls), 2018
- Competitive Dance State Champions (1x): 2008
- Boys Soccer State Champions (2x): 2006, 2021
- Marching Band State Champions (6x): 2017, 2018, 2020, 2021, 2022, 2026
- Baseball State Champions (1x): 2021

== Alumni ==
- Commissioner Brad Howard, 2002
- Shay Mooney, 2010

== Alma Mater ==
Text for the Alma Mater are as follows:

In Arkansas you'll find us,
With all our main and might,
We'll shout aloud forever,
Our love for the green and white,
Three cheers for Van Buren High School,
She loves the truth and right,
All hail the Alma Mater,
All hail the green and white! Go Dogs![citation needed]

The melody of the Alma Mater is set to the tune of Annie Lisle, which is an 1857 ballad written by H. S. Thompson.

== See also ==
- List of high schools in Arkansas
