= Sion H. Rogers =

American politician

Sion Hart Rogers
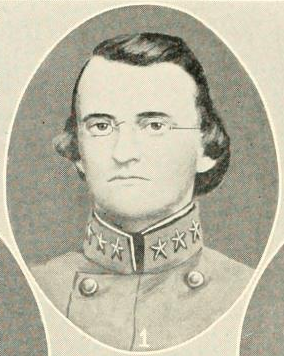
- Rogers as a major in the Confederate States Army
- Born: September 30, 1825; Near Raleigh, North Carolina, U.S.
- Died: August 14, 1874 (aged 48); Raleigh, North Carolina, U.S.
- Occupations: U.S. Congressman, Attorney General
- Political party: Whig (1852–1855), Democratic (1870–1873)

Sion Hart Rogers (September 30, 1825 – August 14, 1874) was a U.S. Congressman and Attorney General of North Carolina.

== Biography ==
Born near Raleigh, North Carolina in 1825, Rogers attended common schools in Wake County and attended the University of North Carolina at Chapel Hill, graduating in 1846. After studying law, he was admitted to the bar in 1848 and commenced practice in Raleigh. As a Whig, he was elected to the 33rd United States Congress in 1852 and served one two-year term (March 4, 1853 - March 3, 1855), declining a renomination in 1854.

Rogers served solicitor of the Raleigh district of the superior court. During the American Civil War, he served in the Confederate States Army as a lieutenant in the Fourteenth Regiment of North Carolina State Troops in 1861; was commissioned colonel of the Forty-seventh North Carolina Infantry April 8, 1862, and resigned January 5, 1863, upon being elected attorney general of the State of North Carolina.

Rogers served as North Carolina Attorney General until 1866. In 1868, he stood for election to Congress once more, but was unsuccessful. He claimed election as a Democrat in 1870 to the 42nd United States Congress, (March 4, 1871 - March 3, 1873). His election was contested, however, by his Republican opponent, and Rogers was disqualified to serve under section 3 of the Fourteenth Amendment. After the election contest was dropped and Congress voted to remove his disabilities, Rogers was sworn in on May 23, 1872. Rogers served a single-term and failed to gain re-election in 1872 and died in Raleigh on August 14, 1874; he is buried in the City Cemetery in Raleigh.

He built the Rogers-Bagley-Daniels-Pegues House about 1855, and it was listed on the National Register of Historic Places in 1979.

Party political offices
First	Democratic nominee for Attorney General of North Carolina; 1868	Succeeded by William Marcus Shipp
U.S. House of Representatives
Preceded by James T. Morehead	Member of the U.S. House of Representatives from North Carolina's 4th congressional district 1853–1855	Succeeded by Lawrence O'Bryan Branch
Preceded by John Manning, Jr.	Member of the U.S. House of Representatives from North Carolina's 4th congressional district 1871–1873	Succeeded by William A. Smith
Legal offices
Preceded by William A. Jenkins	Attorney General of North Carolina; 1863–1868	Succeeded by William M. Coleman
