= John H. Manning =

Lawyer and U.S. Army Major General

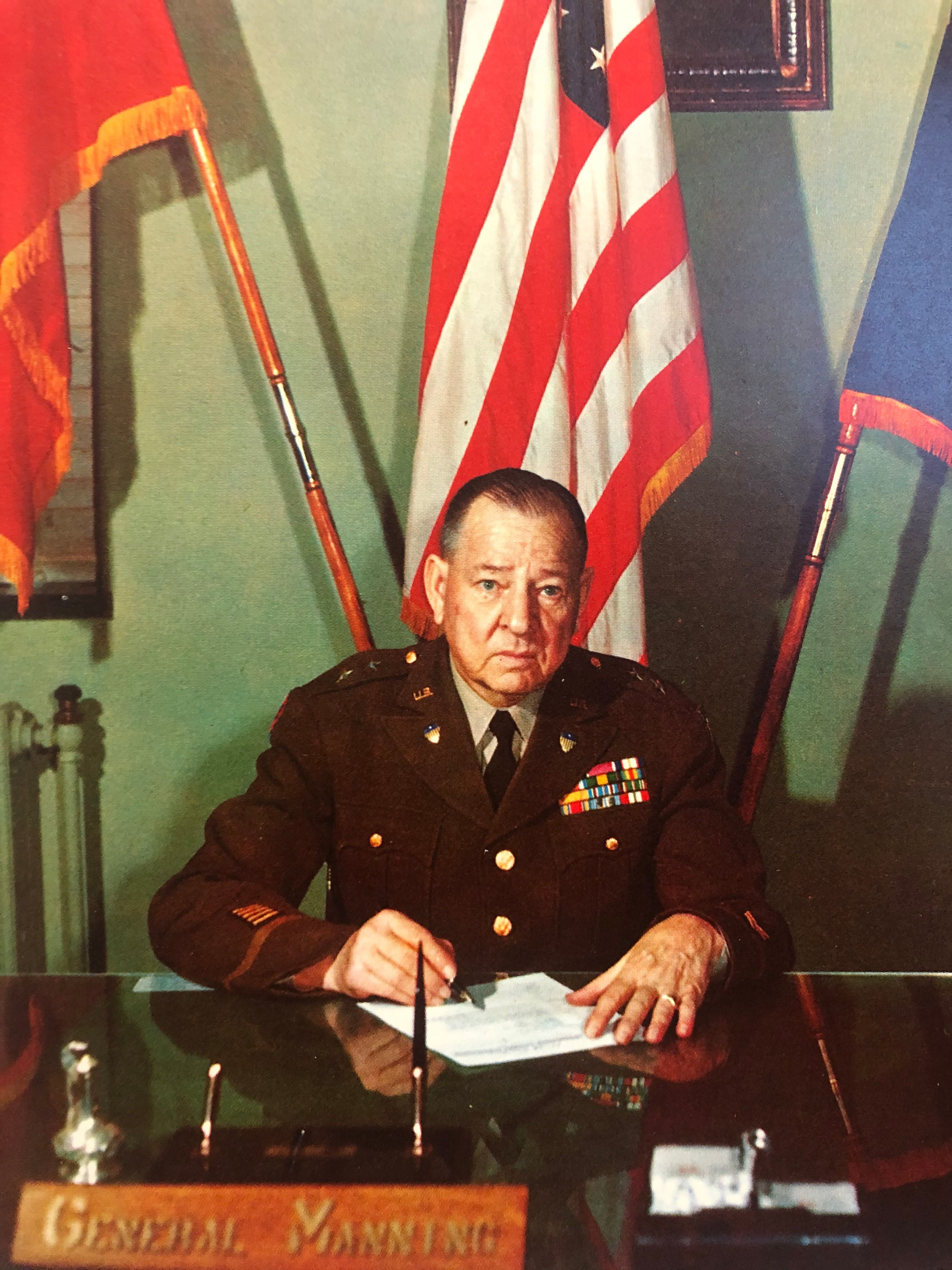
- Adjutant General Manning at his desk
- Born: John Hall Manning; September 27, 1889; Durham, North Carolina, US
- Died: July 21, 1963 (aged 73); Raleigh, North Carolina, US
- Burial place: Raleigh National Cemetery
- Relatives: James S. Manning (father); John Manning Jr. (grandfather)
- Military career
- Branch: North Carolina National Guard
- Service years: 1913–1957
- Rank: Major general
- Commands: Adjutant General of North Carolina; 30th Infantry Division; 120th Infantry Regiment
- Conflicts: World War I; World War II
- Awards: Legion of Merit

John Hall Manning (September 27, 1889 – July 21, 1963) was a lawyer, government official and officer in both North Carolina National Guard and United States Army during World War II. He served as Adjutant General of North Carolina between October 1, 1951 – August 16, 1957. Manning was the son of James S. Manning, North Carolina Attorney General and grandson of John Manning Jr., the United States House of Representatives in 1870 and 1871.

== Early career ==
John Hall Manning was born on September 27, 1889, in Durham, North Carolina as the son of Julia Tate Cain and James S. Manning, who served as North Carolina Attorney General in 1916–1925. His paternal grandfather was John Manning Jr., the United States House of Representatives in 1870 and 1871. Young John attended the public schools in Durham and enrolled the University of North Carolina at Chapel Hill, where he graduated with Bachelor of Arts degree in 1909 and Bachelor of Laws in 1913. During his time at the University, Manning was active in American football and was a member of the German club.

Following his first graduation in 1909, Manning taught at the schools in Durham and Oxford, North Carolina, before becoming a football coach at Stetson University in DeLand, Florida in summer of 1912. He enlisted the North Carolina National Guard as private and was assigned to the 2nd Regiment of Infantry. Manning was admissed to the bar in 1913 and then practiced law in Selma, Kinston, and Raleigh.

Manning quickly reached the rank of first lieutenant and served on the Mexican Border during Pancho Villa Expedition, when his unit was called into Federal service in summer of 1916. Upon the United States' entry into World War I in April 1917, Manning's unit was redesignated 119th Infantry Regiment in September 1917 and he was promoted to captain. He served as regimental adjutant under Colonel John Van Bokkelen Metts at Camp Sevier, South Carolina and embarked with his regiment for France as the part of 30th Infantry Division in May 1918.

He took part as Regimental Operations and Intelligence officer during Second Battle of the Somme and Battle of the Lys and the Escaut between August and November 1918 and finished the war as major commanding 3rd Battalion of his regiment. Manning was later transferred to the Headquarters of American Expeditionary Forces in Paris, France and served as a Liaison Officer to lead then-Under Secretary of the Navy, Franklin D. Roosevelt and his wife Eleanor, during three days of the battlefields in France and Belgium.

Manning returned to the United States and honorably discharged from Federal service in August 1919, retaining his commission in the North Carolina National Guard.

== Interwar period and World War II ==
Manning returned to his law practice following his return stateside and also served as a trustee of University of North Carolina at Chapel Hill between 1921 and 1931. He was appointed an Assistant United States Attorney in 1934 and remained in this capacity until 1946. Manning was meanwhile promoted to lieutenant colonel in the North Carolina National Guard and became the executive officer of the 1st Regiment of Infantry (federally recognized as 120th Infantry Regiment).

Following his promotion to Colonel in 1937, Manning was placed in command of that unit. When the regiment was inducted into Federal service at Raleigh in mid-September 1940, Manning remained in command and led the regiment during the periods of intensive training until October 1942. He was then replaced by regular army officer and later served on the staff of Fort Hayes in Columbus, Ohio.

Manning was later ordered to the North Africa as commanding officer of Replacement Depot and later served in the same capacity in Italy. He also held additional duty as Senior member on an Army Reclassification Board, which was charged with finding some place for officers who had been relieved of their commands for failing to perform their assignments as required. For his service during the War, Manning was decorated with Legion of Merit.

== Postwar career ==
During 1946, Manning was tasked by North Carolina Governor R. Gregg Cherry to assist in reorganizing the North Carolina National Guard, appointed Manning commander of the 30th Infantry Division with the rank of Major general. Manning was appointed U.S. Attorney for the Eastern District of North Carolina at the time and remained in this capacity until late 1951.

In October 1951 Governor W. Kerr Scott appointed Manning Adjutant General of North Carolina, replacing his old superior officer from World War I, John Van Bokkelen Metts. Manning remained in that capacity until mid-August 1957, when he retired from the National Guard. For his meritorious service, he was decorated with North Carolina Distinguished Service Medal and North Carolina Achievement Medal. He was active in the Episcopal Church and was a Democrat.

Major general John H. Manning died of heart attack on July 21, 1963, aged 73 at his home in Raleigh, North Carolina. He was buried at Raleigh National Cemetery.

== Decorations ==
Here is Major General Mannings's ribbon bar:

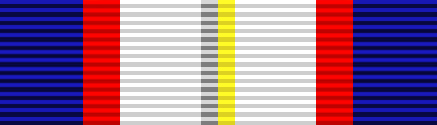

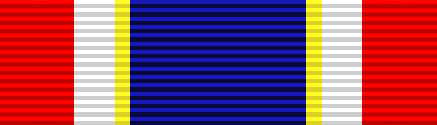

1st Row	Legion of Merit		North Carolina Distinguished Service Medal	
2nd Row	North Carolina Achievement Medal	Mexican Border Service Medal	World War I Victory Medal with three Battle Clasps	American Defense Service Medal
3rd Row	American Campaign Medal	European–African–Middle Eastern Campaign Medal	World War II Victory Medal	Armed Forces Reserve Medal

== Head coaching record ==
Year	Team	Overall	Conference	Standing	Bowl/playoffs
Stetson Hatters (Independent) (1912)
1912	Stetson	5–2			
Stetson:		5–2			
Total:		5–2			

Military offices
Preceded by John Van Bokkelen Metts	Adjutant General of North Carolina; October 1, 1951 – August 16, 1957	Succeeded by Capus Miller Waynick
