= Robert B. Gilliam =

American politician

Robert Gilliam

Member-elect of the U.S. House of Representatives from North Carolina's 4th district
- Died before assuming office
- Preceded by: John T. Deweese
- Succeeded by: John Manning Jr.

Personal details
- Born: Robert Ballard Gilliam; November 20, 1805 Granville County, North Carolina, U.S.
- Died: October 17, 1870 (aged 64) Oxford, North Carolina, U.S.
- Party: Democratic
- Other political affiliations: Conservative
- Education: University of North Carolina, Chapel Hill (BA)

Robert Ballard Gilliam (1805–1870) was a North Carolina politician and judge. He was born, lived and died in Granville County. He was the son of Leslie Gilliam, the long-time sheriff of Granville.

R.B. Gilliam graduated from the University of North Carolina at Chapel Hill in 1823, in the same class with future state Treasurer Daniel W. Courts, future Chief Justice Richmond M. Pearson, and others. He then began practicing law. Gilliam was also a member of the 1835 convention that thoroughly revised the Constitution of North Carolina.

Gilliam was elected to represent Granville County in the North Carolina General Assembly House of Commons in 1836, 1838, 1840, 1846, 1848 and 1862. For much of his time in the House, he served as speaker of the house. In 1863, he was elevated to the state superior court bench.

In 1870, Gilliam was elected as a Conservative to the United States House of Representatives in a special election (following the resignation of John T. Deweese), but before he could take his seat, he died.

John H. Wheeler wrote of Gilliam, "As a statesman, he was a pure and patriotic; as a lawyer, he was learned and able, and his ability was only equalled by the kindly qualities of his heart. Such were the conspicuous traits of his character, which endeared him to all who knew him."

U.S. House of Representatives
Preceded by John T. Deweese	Member-elect of the U.S. House of Representatives from North Carolina's 4th congressional district 1870	Succeeded by John Manning Jr.
