= Van Buren Historic District =

Historic district in Arkansas, United States

- U.S. National Register of Historic Places
- U.S. Historic district
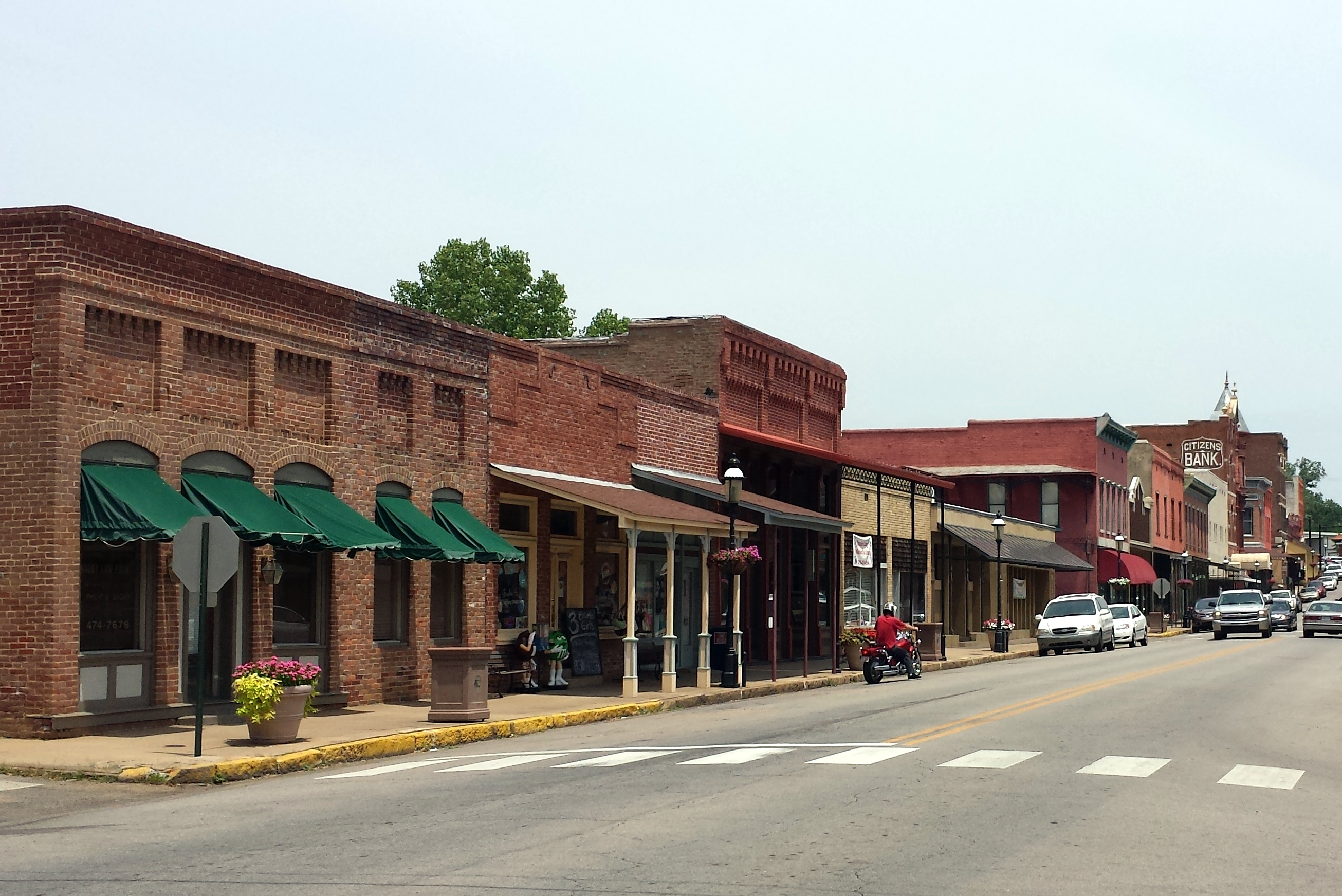

- Location within Arkansas Location within the United States
- Location: Main Street bounded by Cane Hill Street and the Arkansas River in Van Buren, Arkansas
- Coordinates: 35°26′4″N 94°21′15″W
- Area: 20 acres (8.1 ha)
- Architectural style: Primarily Victorian, also Italianate, Queen Anne and Chicago school
- NRHP reference No.: 76000402; 100013229 (decrease)

Significant dates
- Added to NRHP: April 30, 1976
- Boundary decrease: July 16, 2026

The Van Buren Historic District encompasses eight blocks of historic buildings along Main Street in Van Buren, Arkansas. Many of the structures are pre-1920 Victorian and Italianate buildings closely related to the history of commerce in the city. Positioned between the city's train depot and the Arkansas River, the businesses constituting the Van Buren Historic District have played a vital role in the history and economy of the city and region. The district was placed on the National Register of Historic Places as a National Historic District on April 30, 1976.

== Properties in the district ==
=== Crawford County Courthouse ===
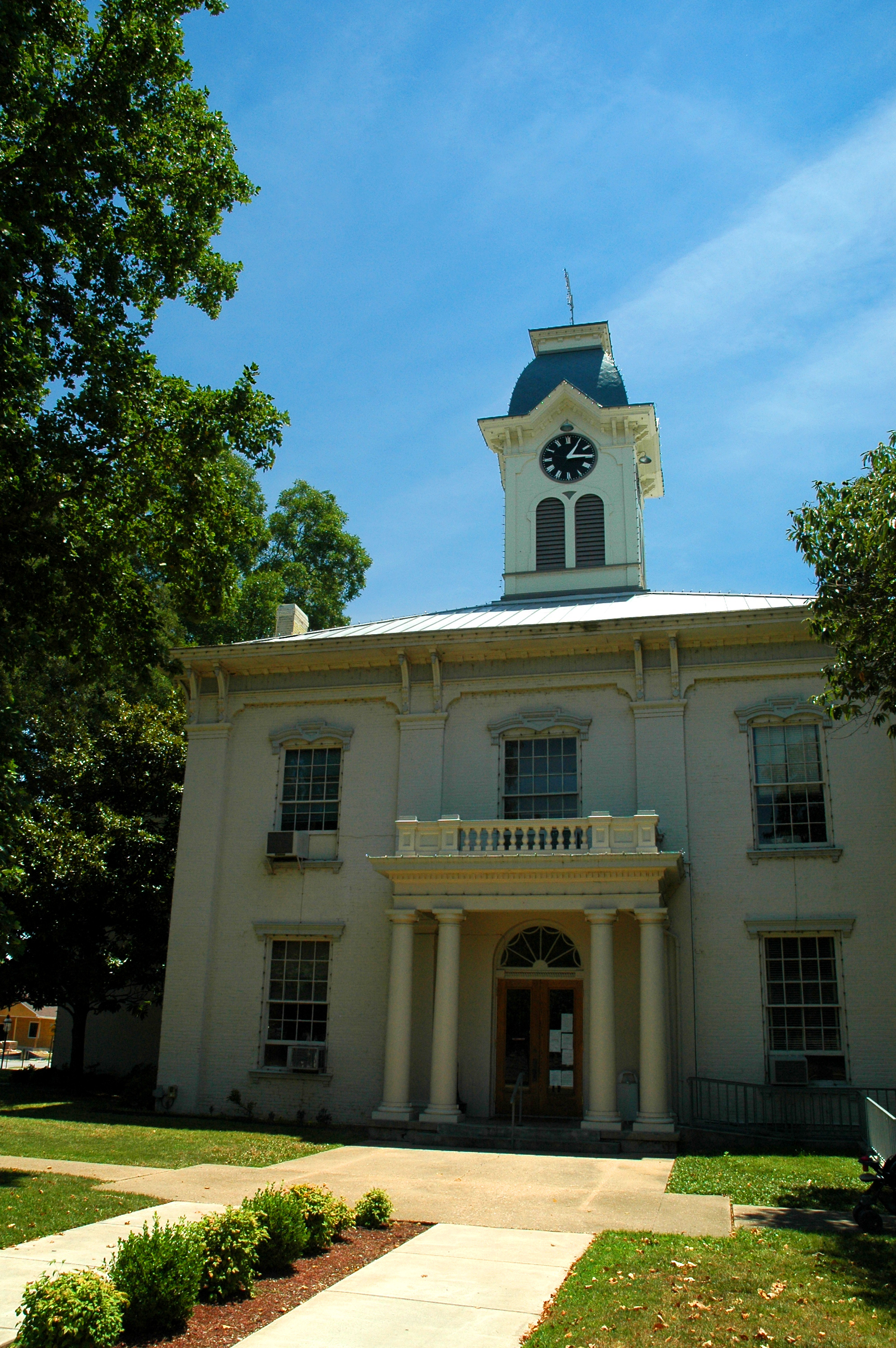

The Crawford County Courthouse, originally built in 1842, is the oldest operating courthouse west of the Mississippi River. Following a fire in 1876, the courthouse was rebuilt using the original walls that survived the blaze. Doric columns, a three-story clock tower with bell, cast roof rises and a classic portico constitute the building's facade. Wings flank the building to the southeast and northwest. A fountain featuring Hebe and 1832 log schoolhouse used by Albert Pike are located on the courthouse grounds, as well as the Confederate soldier monument in front of the structure.

=== Confederate monument ===
The Van Buren Confederate Monument was listed on the National Register of Historic Places in 1996 as part of the Civil War Commemorative Sculpture Multiple Property Submission.

=== Hebe fountain ===
Originally placed in 1908 by the Women's Village Improvement Society, a gold-painted iron statue of Hebe, the Greek goddess of youth and happiness, has remained on the Crawford County Courthouse lawn ever since. The Women's league of Van Buren raised funds, and the original Hebe was replaced after falling to disrepair. In 2003, a bronze-cast statue was unveiled and the original was placed in the Crawford County Museum. The original steel cap around the fountain was restored and returned to service.

=== Albert Pike School ===
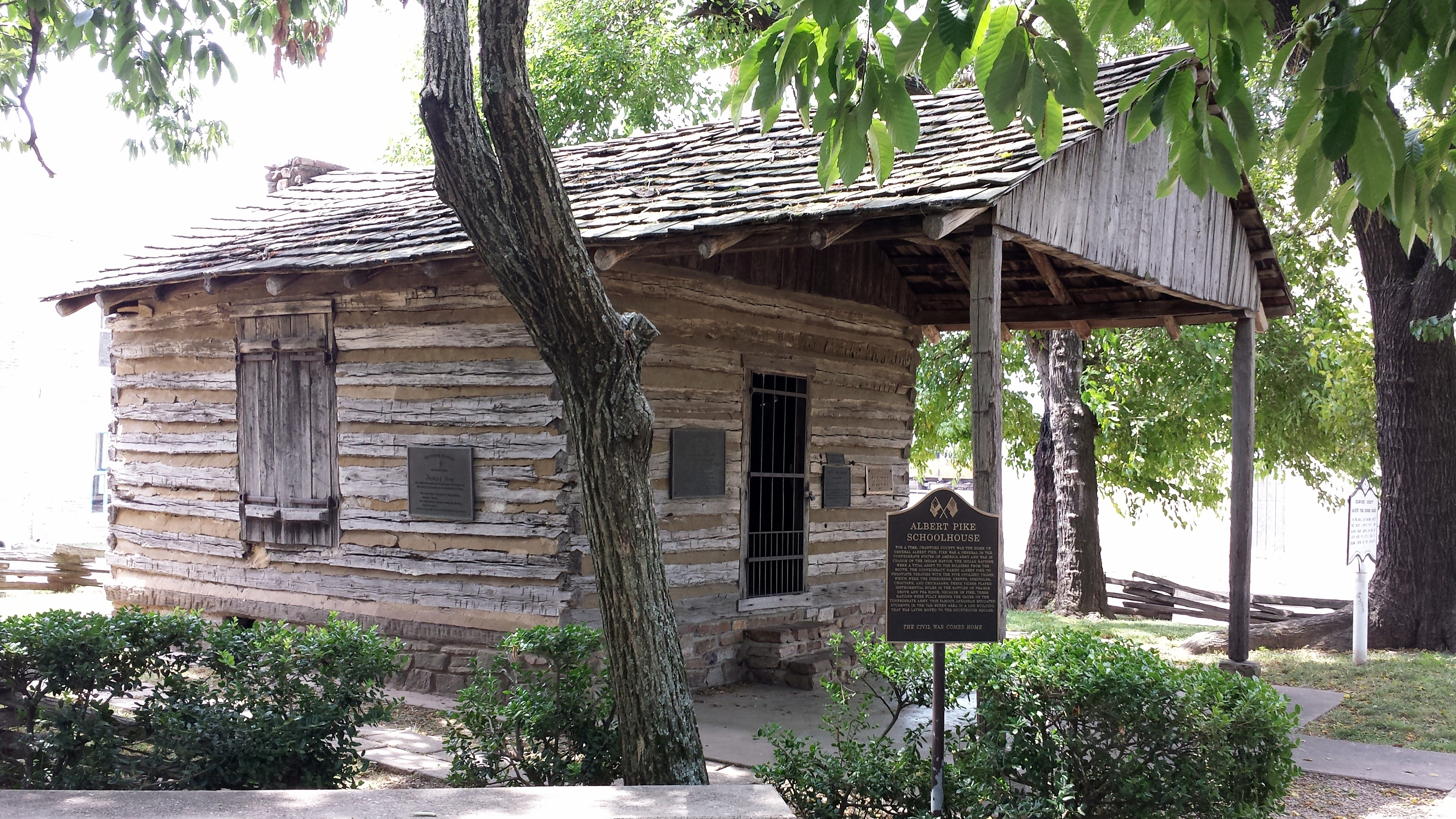

One of the oldest buildings in Arkansas, the log schoolhouse on the southwest portion of the courthouse grounds was built circa 1820. It was used by Albert Pike, a schoolteacher from the northeast who moved to western Arkansas in 1833. Pike did not teach at the school long before moving to Little Rock, where he became involved in politics, law, and the Arkansas Gazette. Pike would go on to become a noted poet and writer in addition to serving as a general for the Confederate States of America, most notably serving at the Battle of Pea Ridge. He also served the Freemasons as Sovereign Grand Commander of the Scottish Rite's Southern Jurisdiction and established lodges throughout the South following the war. Pike later refused an honorary degree from Harvard University, a school he had been accepted to but elected to become a teacher rather than attend.

== Images ==
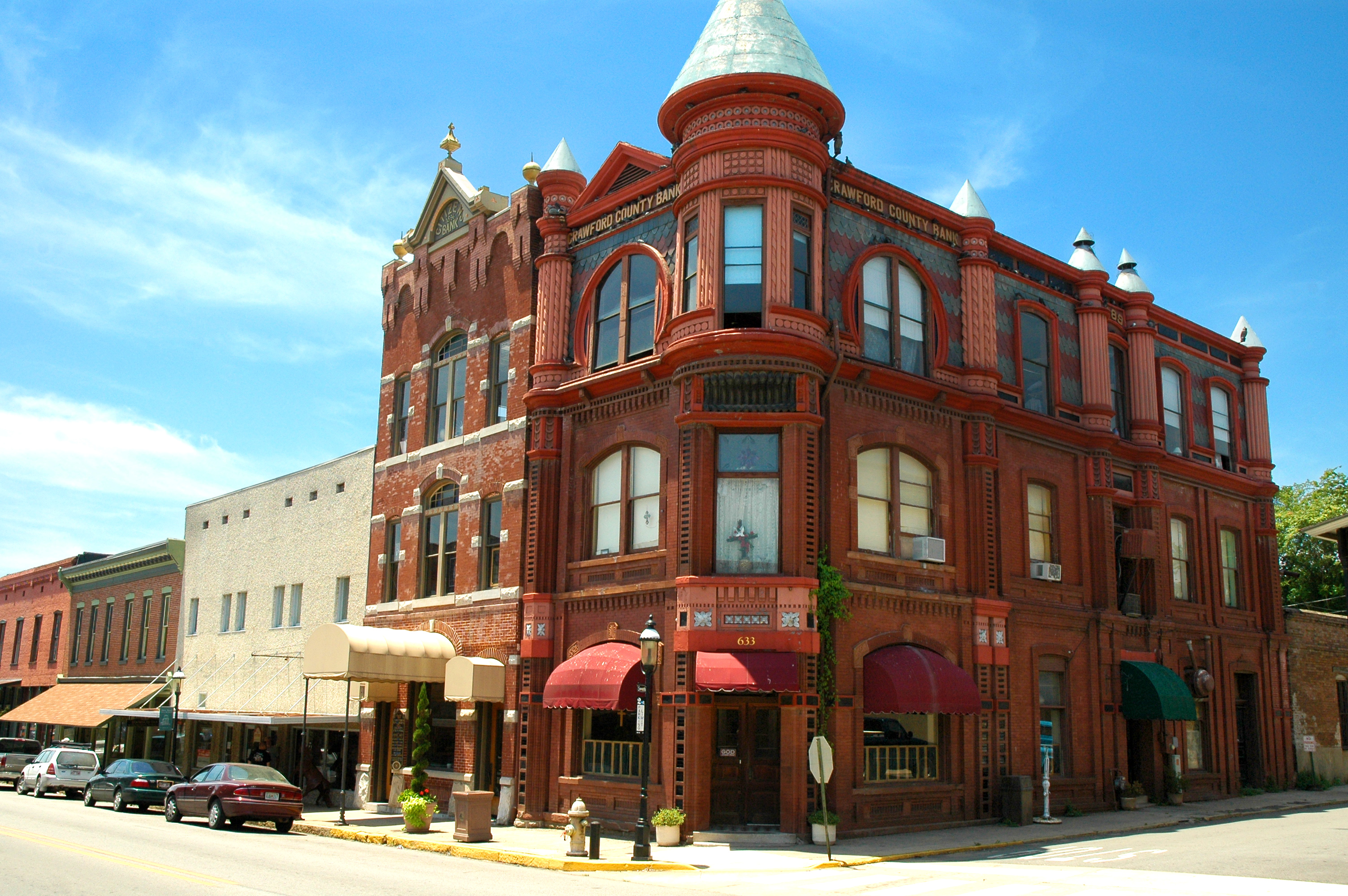
Building formerly used by the Crawford County Bank, 2006

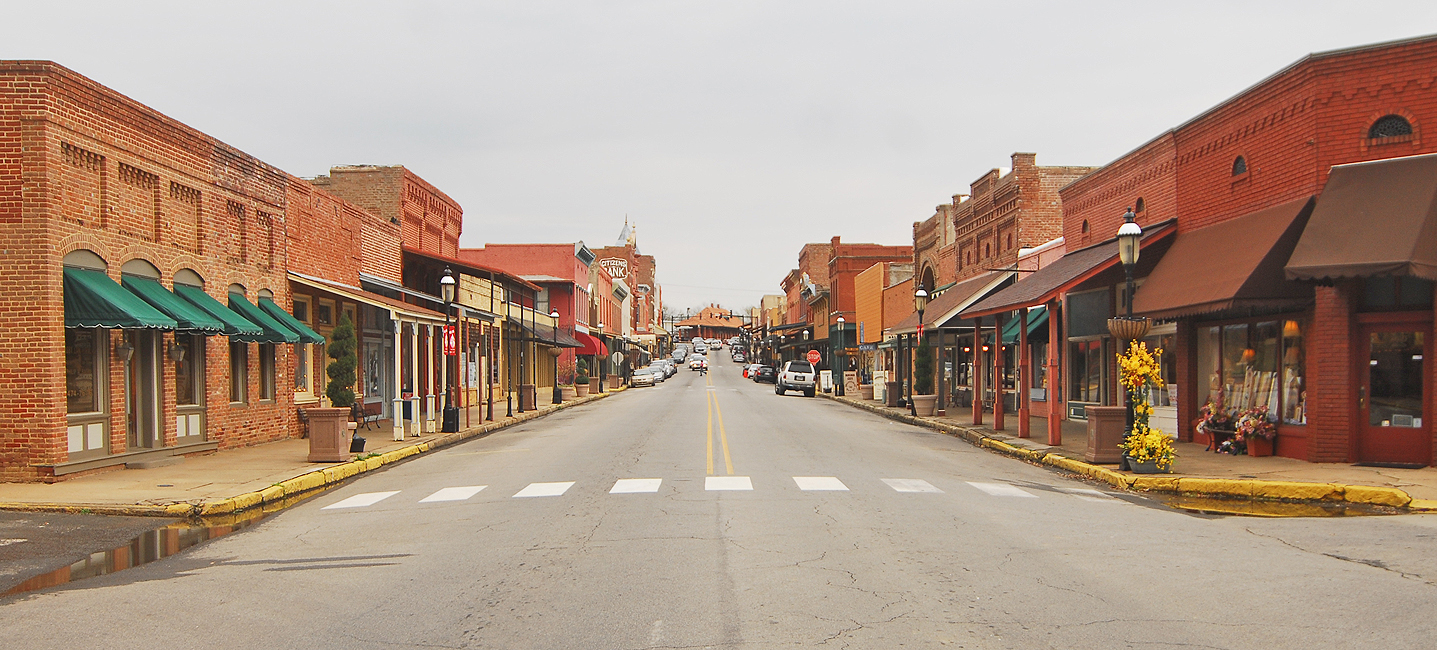
Historic downtown, 2009

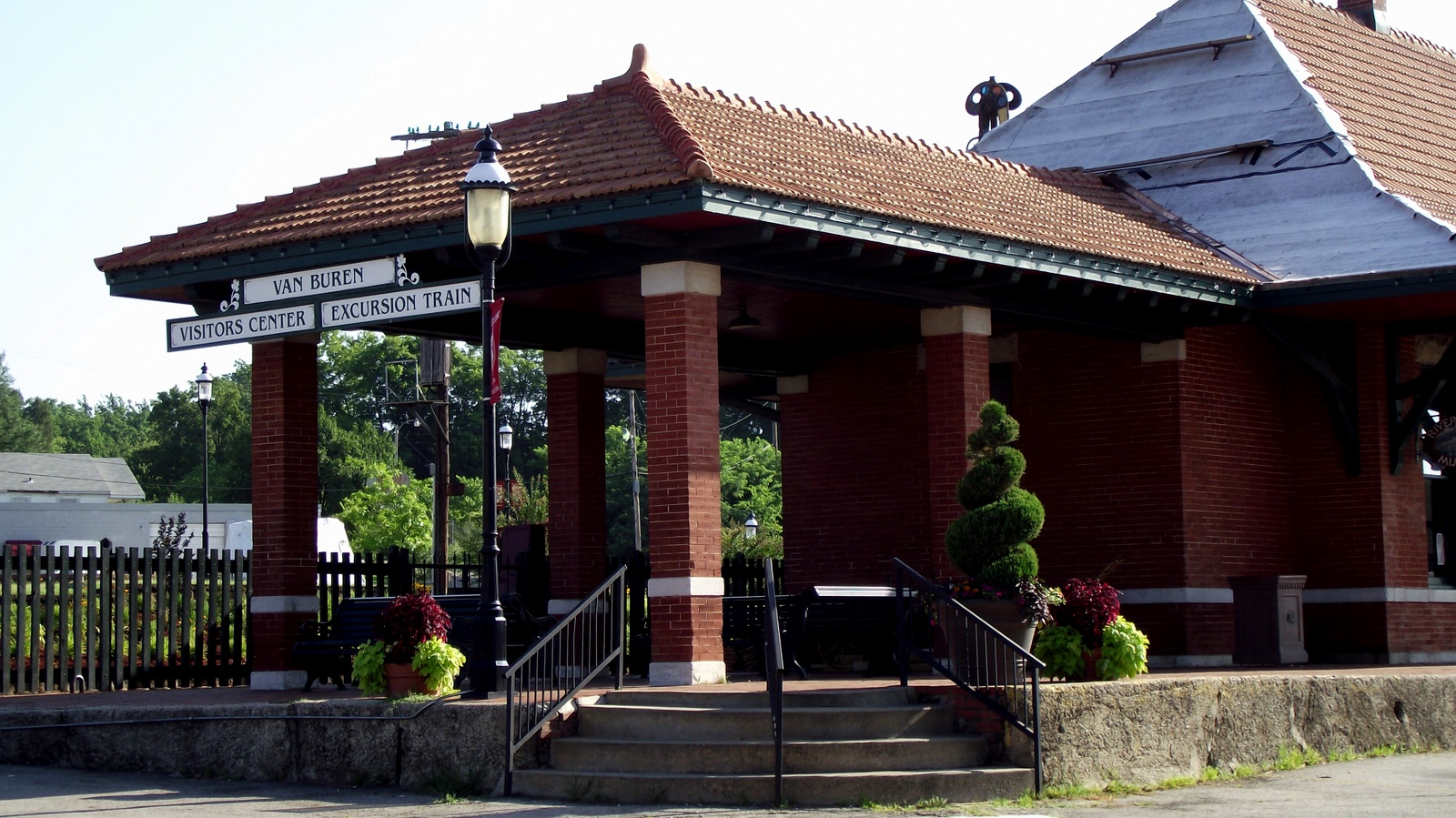
Visitors Center, 2010

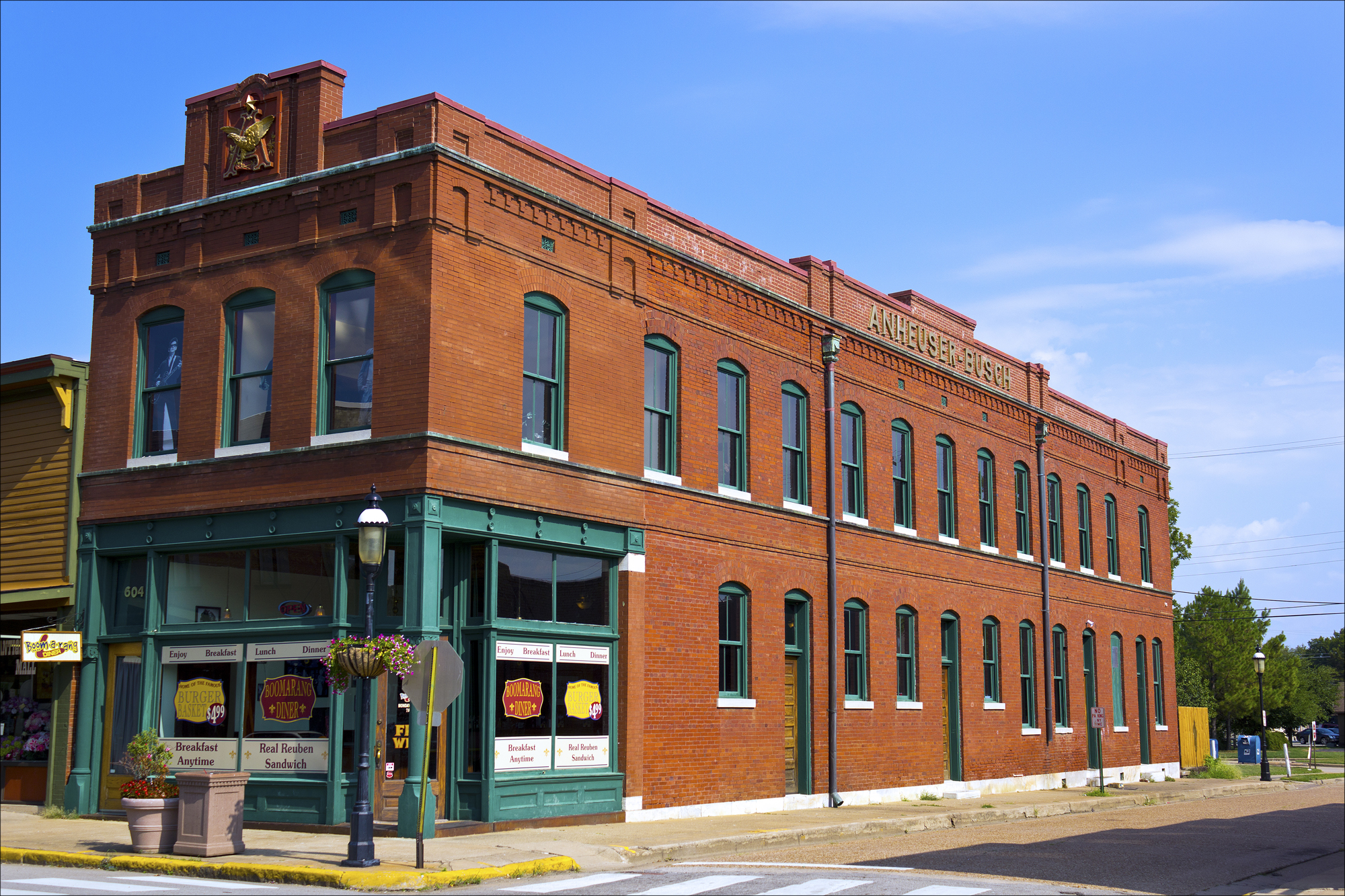
The Anheuser-Busch Building, 2011

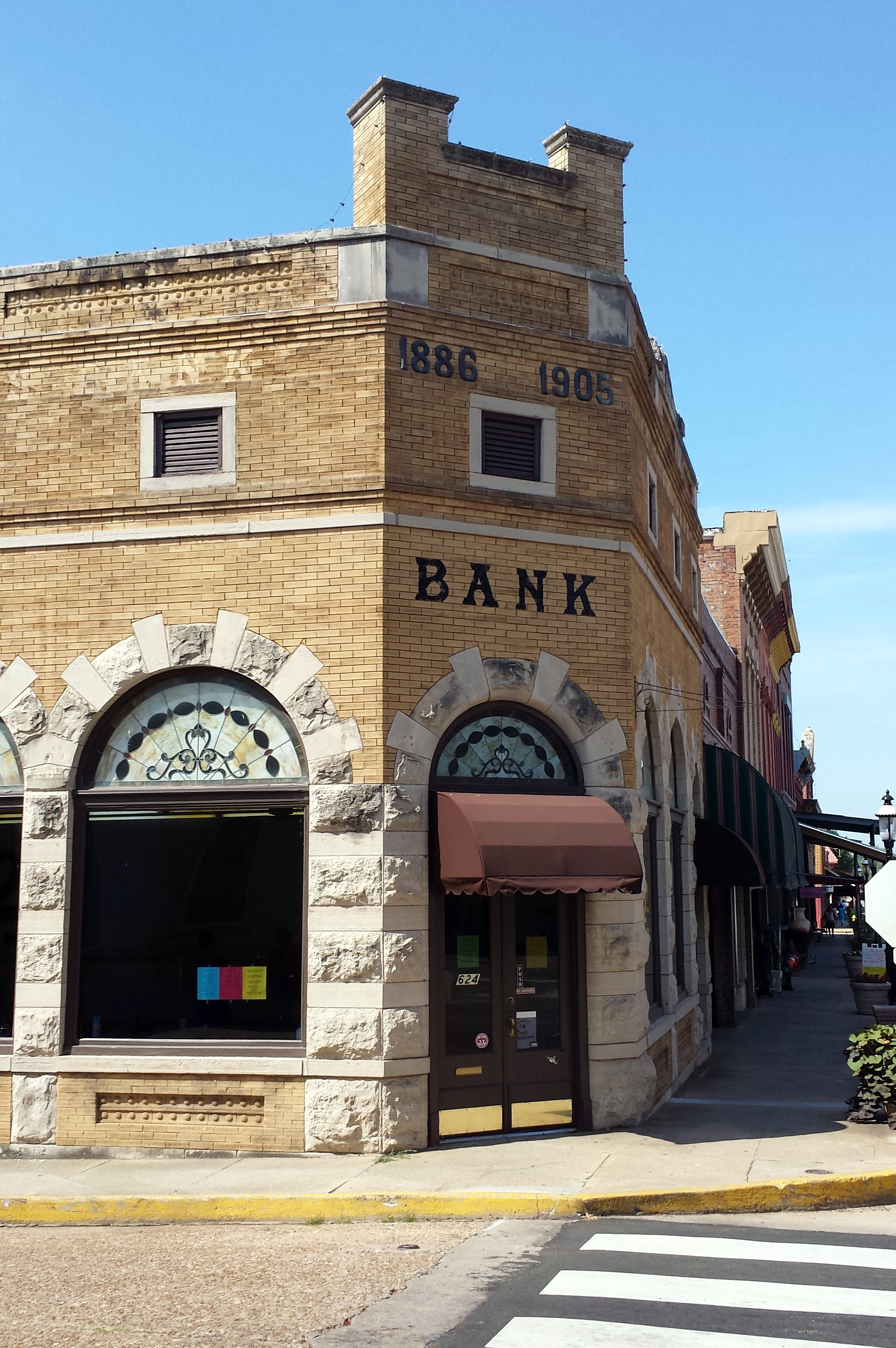
Second Citizens Bank building, 2013

== See also ==
- National Register of Historic Places listings in Crawford County, Arkansas
