= James S. Manning =

American judge (1859–1938)

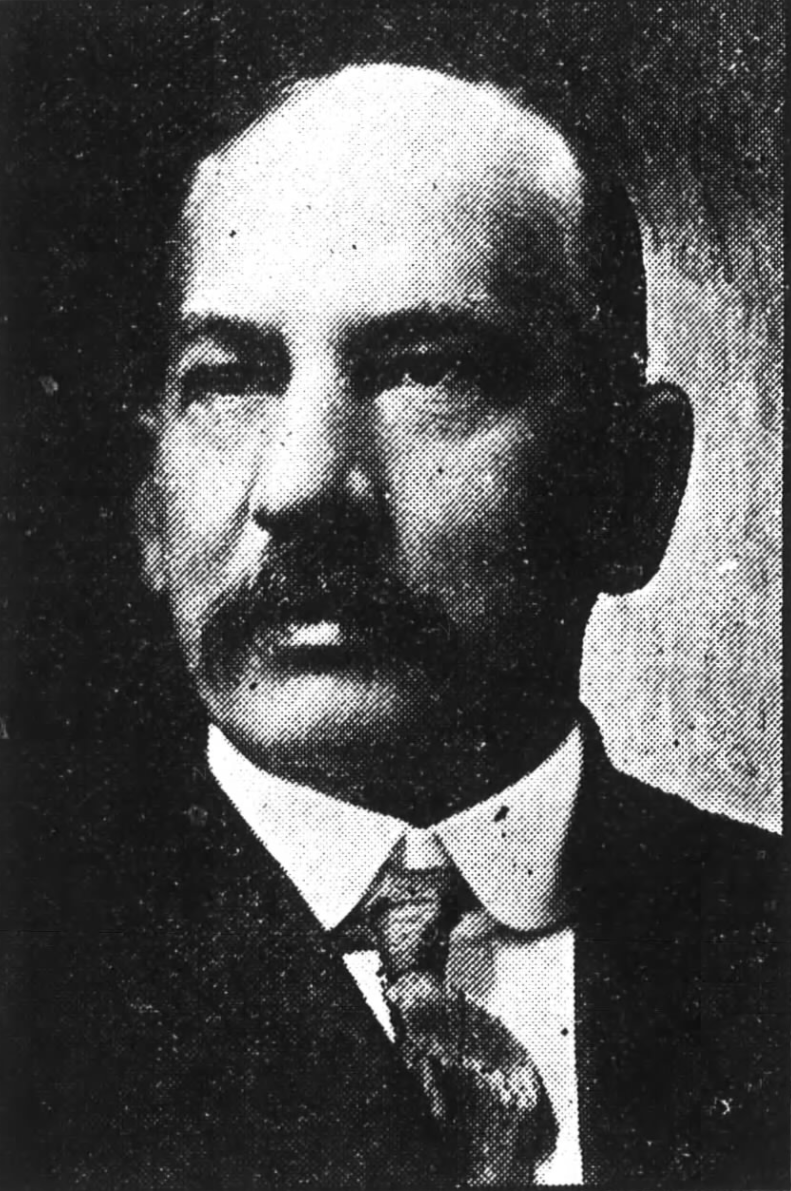
Justice James S. Manning, pictured in an advertisement for his bid for Attorney General

James Smith Manning (June 1, 1859 – July 28, 1938) was a justice of the North Carolina Supreme Court from 1909 to 1911, and Attorney General of North Carolina from 1916 to 1925.

Born in Pittsboro, North Carolina as the son of John Manning Jr., the United States House of Representatives, Manning graduated from the University of North Carolina and practiced law in Durham, North Carolina. He served in the North Carolina House of Representatives and the North Carolina Senate, and was appointed by Governor William Walton Kitchin to a seat on the state supreme court to a seat vacated by the elevation of Henry G. Connor to a federal judgeship. Manning was defeated in a bid for the Democratic nomination for reelection to the seat in July 1910. Manning was elected Attorney General in 1916. He served in that office until 1925, and then returned to private practice for the remainder of his career.

Manning died in his home in Raleigh, North Carolina, at the age of 79. He was the father of lawyer and future Adjutant General of North Carolina, John H. Manning.

Party political offices
Preceded by Thomas Walter Bickett	Democratic nominee for Attorney General of North Carolina; 1916, 1920	Succeeded by Dennis G. Brummitt
Political offices
Preceded by Henry G. Connor	Justice of the North Carolina Supreme Court; 1909–1911	Succeeded by William Reynolds Allen
Preceded by Thomas Walter Bickett	Attorney General of North Carolina; 1916–1925	Succeeded by Dennis G. Brummitt
