= Van Buren, Arkansas =

- City
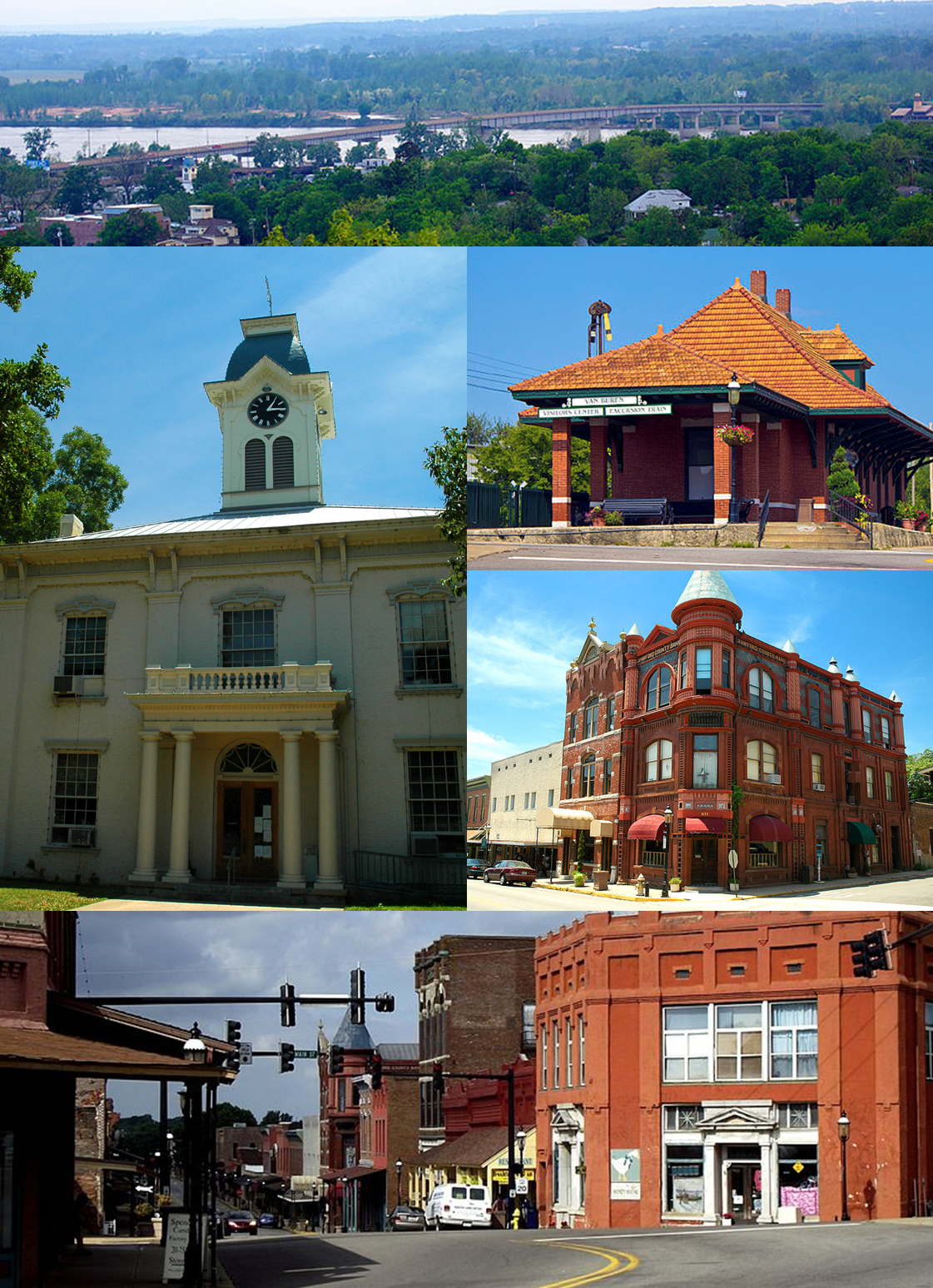
- Clockwise, from top: US 64/US 71B bridge over the Arkansas River, Van Buren Old Frisco Depot, Crawford County Bank Building, Main Street in the Van Buren Historic District, Crawford County Courthouse

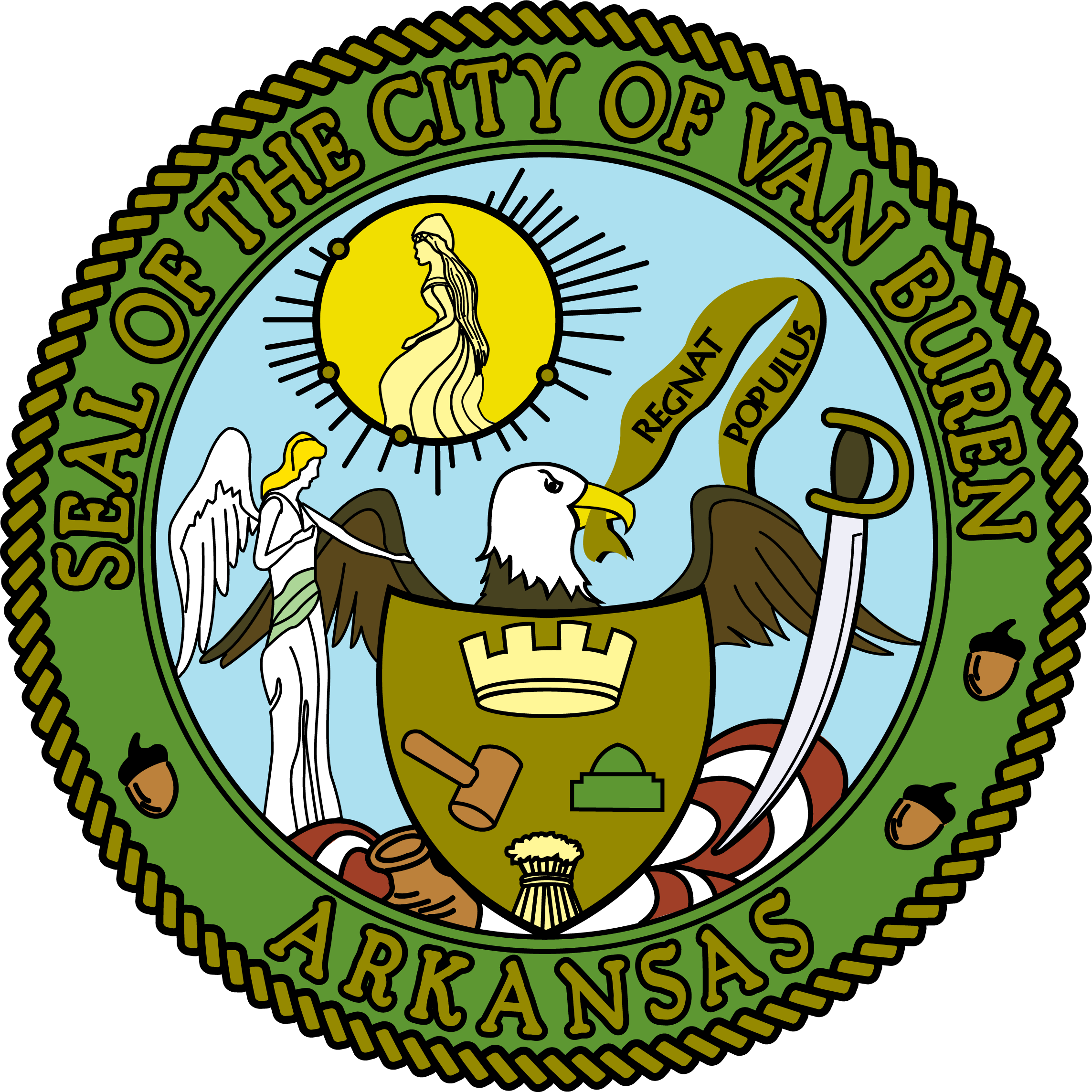
- Seal

- Location of Van Buren in Crawford County, Arkansas

- Location within the contiguous United States of America
- Coordinates: 35°26′54″N 94°21′10″W
- Country: United States
- State: Arkansas
- County: Crawford
- Township(s): Dora, Van Buren
- Incorporated: January 4, 1845
- Named for: Martin Van Buren

Government
  - Type: Mayor–Council
  - Mayor: Joe Hurst (I)
  - Council: Members: Madison Simmons; Matt Dodson; Tyler Wood; Tonia Fry; Michael Kneeland; Shannon Newerth-Henson

Area
  - City: 16.10 sq mi (41.70 km^{2})
  - Land: 15.42 sq mi (39.94 km^{2})
  - Water: 0.68 sq mi (1.76 km^{2})
- Elevation: 650 ft (200 m)

Population (2020)
  - City: 23,218
  - Estimate (2025): 24,556 ▲
  - Density: 1,505.7/sq mi (581.34/km^{2})
  - Metro: 227,213 (Fort Smith metropolitan area)
- Time zone: UTC−6 (CST)
  - Summer (DST): UTC−5 (CDT)
- ZIP code(s): 72956
- Area code(s): 479
- FIPS code: 05-71480
- GNIS feature ID: 2405637
- Major airport: FSM
- Website: www.cityofvanburenar.gov

Van Buren (/væn ˈbjʊərən/ van BURE-ən) is the second-largest city in the Fort Smith, Arkansas–Oklahoma Metropolitan Statistical Area and the county seat of Crawford County, Arkansas, United States. The city is located directly northeast of Fort Smith at the Interstate 40 – Interstate 540 junction. The city was incorporated in 1845 and as of the 2020 census had a population of 23,218, ranking it as the state's 21st largest city. According to 2023 population estimates from the U.S. Census Bureau, Van Buren’s population is 24,138. With a 4% growth rate from 2020 to 2023, Van Buren is Arkansas’s eighth-fastest growing city.

== History ==
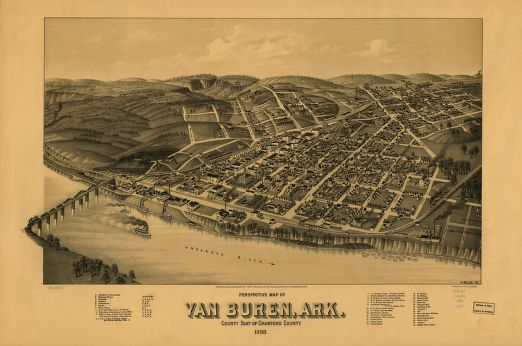
Perspective Map of Van Buren, Ark., County Seat of Crawford County, 1888. by Henry Wellge & Co.

=== Early history ===
The area was settled by David Boyd and Thomas Martin in 1818. After Arkansas became a territory in 1819, Daniel and Thomas Phillips constructed a lumber yard in the community to serve as a fuel depot for traffic along the Arkansas River. In 1831, a post office was constructed for the community, at the time known as Phillips Landing. This post office was named after newly appointed Secretary of State and future President Martin Van Buren.

John Drennen, along with his partner David Thompson, purchased the area for US$11,000. They moved their business of supplying firewood for steamboats to this new location on higher ground. The courthouse was constructed on a lot of land donated by Drennen on the condition that Van Buren become the county seat. The Drennen Reserve is one of the town's existing historical sites from the 1830s.

Van Buren was incorporated on January 4, 1845. Walker Institute was established near Van Buren in 1857. Peter A. Moses was principal.

=== American Civil War ===
On December 28, 1862, Union and Confederate forces clashed in and around Van Buren, resulting in a defeat for the Confederates, led by Major General T. C. Hindman, driving them south across the river with minimal casualties. Federal forces captured 100 prisoners, as stated in an official report by Major General Samuel R. Curtis.

=== Veterans ===
VFW Post 1322 located in Van Buren was founded on February 13, 1925, making it the oldest VFW Post in the State of Arkansas. It was named after local veteran Robert W. Jack, who served in the United States Army with the 2nd Arkansas Infantry Regiment and was killed in action on September 22, 1918 in the Battle of Saint-Mihiel in World War I. Jack was buried at St. Mihiel American Cemetery and there is a monument in his honor in Van Buren. In 2018, the town dedicated the Veterans Memorial Plaza in the heart of the downtown area.

=== 2019 flood ===
In late May to early June 2019, the Arkansas River flooded near Van Buren, cresting at nearly 41 feet (12 m), which is 21 feet (6.4 m) above the flood stage. Significant rainfall in the South-central United States forced U.S. Army Corps of Engineers workers to release large amounts of water to ease flooding upstream. The river approached 41 feet (12 m) at the Van Buren gauge over the course of several days, and the flooding damaged 25 homes in the Crawford County area. While one Crawford County levee sustained damage, no levee breaches occurred in Van Buren.

=== 1996 tornado ===
On April 21, 1996, at 11:12 p.m., an F3 tornado hit the Fort Smith/Van Buren area causing extensive damage. The tornado, which spawned in Oklahoma and crossed into west Fort Smith near the confluence of the Arkansas and Poteau rivers, killed two, injured 89 and caused $300 million in damage. The fatalities were small children from Fort Smith. At its worst, the tornado was one half mile across. After leaving the downtown area of Fort Smith, it traveled northeast through industrial and residential sections of north Fort Smith, then crossed the Arkansas River again into the Mount Vista area on the west side of Van Buren and damaged a highly residential area where no fatalities occurred, although this area was very populated at the time. The total distance it traveled on the ground was 7 miles (11 km). In total, there were around 1,800 homes damaged, the majority of which were in Van Buren.

=== Physical geography ===
Van Buren is located in the southwest corner of Crawford County with the Arkansas–Oklahoma state line just 2 miles (3 km) to the west. The Arkansas River forms the southern boundary of the city, separating it from Fort Smith of Sebastian County. Lee Creek flows through the western side of the city into the Arkansas River. According to the United States Census Bureau, Van Buren has a total area of 16.5 square miles (42.7 km^{2}), of which 15.4 square miles (40.0 km^{2}) is land and 1.0 square mile (2.7 km^{2}), or 6.34%, is water.

=== Climate ===
Van Buren lies within a humid subtropical climate area. The city also lies on the eastern edge of the region known as Tornado Alley. Average temperatures range from 36°F in January, to as high an average of 81 °F in July with temperatures reaching the high 90s and low 100s in August. The average annual temperature is approximately 60 °F. Average precipitation is about 41 total inches, with only six inches being snow.

July and August are the hottest months of the year, with an average high of 93 °F (34 °C) and an average low of 71.5 °F (21.9 °C). Temperatures above 100 °F (37.8 °C) are not uncommon, occurring on average eleven times a year. December and January are the coldest months with an average high of 50.5 °F (10.3 °C) and an average low of 30 °F (−1 °C). Highs below 32 °F (0.0 °C) occur on average five times a year, with 0.2 nights per year dropping below 0 °F (−17.8 °C). The city's highest temperature was 113 °F (45.0 °C), recorded in 1936. The lowest temperature recorded was −15 °F (−26.1 °C), in 1899.

Climate data for Van Buren, Arkansas
| Month | Jan | Feb | Mar | Apr | May | Jun | Jul | Aug | Sep | Oct | Nov | Dec | Year |
|---|---|---|---|---|---|---|---|---|---|---|---|---|---|
| Record high °F (°C) | 81 (27) | 87 (31) | 94 (34) | 96 (36) | 99 (37) | 106 (41) | 111 (44) | 113 (45) | 109 (43) | 96 (36) | 86 (30) | 82 (28) | 113 (45) |
| Mean daily maximum °F (°C) | 50 (10) | 56 (13) | 65 (18) | 74 (23) | 81 (27) | 88 (31) | 93 (34) | 93 (34) | 85 (29) | 75 (24) | 63 (17) | 51 (11) | 72.7 (22.6) |
| Mean daily minimum °F (°C) | 29 (−2) | 33 (1) | 41 (5) | 50 (10) | 59 (15) | 68 (20) | 72 (22) | 71 (22) | 62 (17) | 51 (11) | 40 (4) | 31 (−1) | 50.4 (10.2) |
| Record low °F (°C) | −11 (−24) | −15 (−26) | 7 (−14) | 22 (−6) | 34 (1) | 47 (8) | 50 (10) | 45 (7) | 33 (1) | 22 (−6) | 8 (−13) | −5 (−21) | −15 (−26) |
| Average precipitation inches (mm) | 2.81 (71) | 2.86 (73) | 3.85 (98) | 4.30 (109) | 5.47 (139) | 4.28 (109) | 3.30 (84) | 2.59 (66) | 4.05 (103) | 4.32 (110) | 4.44 (113) | 3.29 (84) | 45.40 (1,153) |
| Average snowfall inches (cm) | 1.8 (4.6) | 1.3 (3.3) | 0.7 (1.8) | 0 (0) | 0 (0) | 0 (0) | 0 (0) | 0 (0) | 0 (0) | 0 (0) | 0 (0) | 0.7 (1.8) | 4.6 (12) |
| Average precipitation days (≥ 0.01 in) | 7.5 | 7.8 | 9.7 | 9.1 | 10.7 | 9.3 | 6.5 | 6.3 | 7.7 | 8.4 | 7.5 | 7.7 | 98.3 |
| Average snowy days (≥ 0.1 in) | 1.0 | 0.8 | 0.4 | 0 | 0 | 0 | 0 | 0 | 0 | 0 | 0.1 | 0.6 | 2.9 |
Source 1: NOAA
Source 2: The Weather Channel

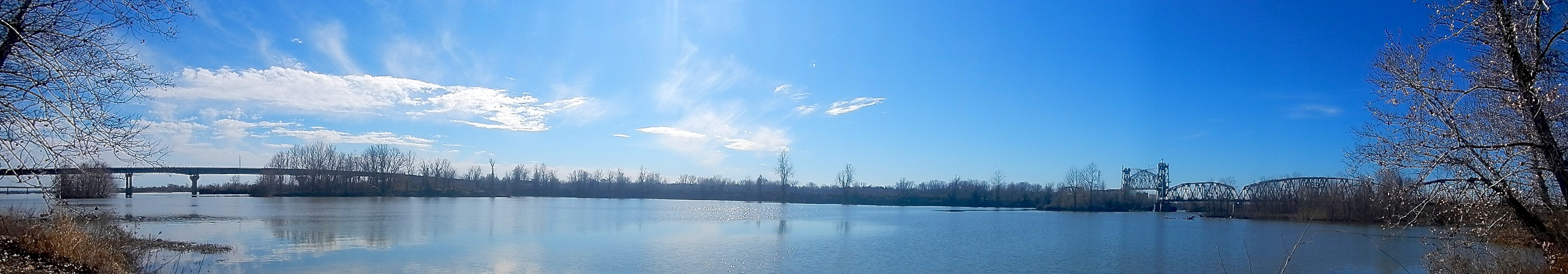
View of the Arkansas River from Meyer Park, 2013

== Demographics ==
Historical population
| Census | Pop. | Note | %± |
|---|---|---|---|
| 1850 | 549 | | — |
| 1860 | 979 | | 78.3% |
| 1870 | 985 | | 0.6% |
| 1880 | 1,029 | | 4.5% |
| 1890 | 2,291 | | 122.6% |
| 1900 | 2,573 | | 12.3% |
| 1910 | 3,878 | | 50.7% |
| 1920 | 5,224 | | 34.7% |
| 1930 | 5,182 | | −0.8% |
| 1940 | 5,422 | | 4.6% |
| 1950 | 6,413 | | 18.3% |
| 1960 | 6,787 | | 5.8% |
| 1970 | 8,373 | | 23.4% |
| 1980 | 12,020 | | 43.6% |
| 1990 | 14,979 | | 24.6% |
| 2000 | 18,986 | | 26.8% |
| 2010 | 22,791 | | 20.0% |
| 2020 | 23,218 | | 1.9% |
| 2025 (est.) | 24,556 | ▲ | 5.8% |
U.S. Decennial Census

=== 2020 census ===
As of the 2020 census, Van Buren had a population of 23,218, 8,776 households, and 6,011 families. The median age was 35.8 years. 26.5% of residents were under the age of 18 and 15.4% of residents were 65 years of age or older. For every 100 females there were 90.6 males, and for every 100 females age 18 and over there were 87.0 males age 18 and over.

99.6% of residents lived in urban areas, while 0.4% lived in rural areas.

There were 8,776 households in Van Buren, of which 35.5% had children under the age of 18 living in them. Of all households, 46.2% were married-couple households, 16.5% were households with a male householder and no spouse or partner present, and 29.9% were households with a female householder and no spouse or partner present. About 26.5% of all households were made up of individuals and 11.0% had someone living alone who was 65 years of age or older.

There were 9,464 housing units, of which 7.3% were vacant. The homeowner vacancy rate was 1.8% and the rental vacancy rate was 9.9%.

Racial composition as of the 2020 census
| Race | Number | Percentage |
|---|---|---|
| White | 17,072 | 73.5% |
| Black or African American | 602 | 2.6% |
| American Indian and Alaska Native | 628 | 2.7% |
| Asian | 714 | 3.1% |
| Native Hawaiian and Other Pacific Islander | 18 | 0.1% |
| Some other race | 1,686 | 7.3% |
| Two or more races | 2,498 | 10.8% |
| Hispanic or Latino (of any race) | 3,059 | 13.2% |

=== 2000 census ===
As of the census of 2000, there were 18,986 people, 6,947 households, and 5,182 families residing in the city. The population density was 1,260.7 inhabitants per square mile (486.8/km^{2}). There were 7,427 housing units at an average density of 493.2 per square mile (190.4/km^{2}). The racial makeup of the city was 87.37% White, 1.64% Black or African American, 1.96% Native American, 2.82% Asian, 3.17% from other races, and 3.03% from two or more races. 6.04% of the population were Hispanic or Latino of any race.

There were 6,947 households, of which 40.4% had children under the age of 18 living with them, 56.2% were married couples living together, 14.7% had a female householder with no husband present, and 25.4% were classified as non-families by the United States Census Bureau. Of 6,947 households, 362 were unmarried partner households: 304 heterosexual, 12 same-sex male, and 46 same-sex female households. 21.7% of all households were made up of individuals, and 8.2% had someone living alone who was 65 years of age or older. The average household size was 2.67 and the average family size was 3.12.

In the city, the population was spread out, with 29.6% under the age of 18, 9.0% from 18 to 24, 30.7% from 25 to 44, 20.1% from 45 to 64, and 10.6% who were 65 years of age or older. The median age was 33 years. For every 100 females, there were 92.0 males. For every 100 females age 18 and over, there were 86.8 males.

The median income for a household in the city was $33,608, and the median income for a family was $37,198. Males had a median income of $28,798 versus $21,201 for females. The per capita income for the city was $14,948. About 13.5% of families and 16.7% of the population were below the poverty line, including 24.4% of those under age 18 and 13.0% of those age 65 or over.

== Economy and Infrastructure ==
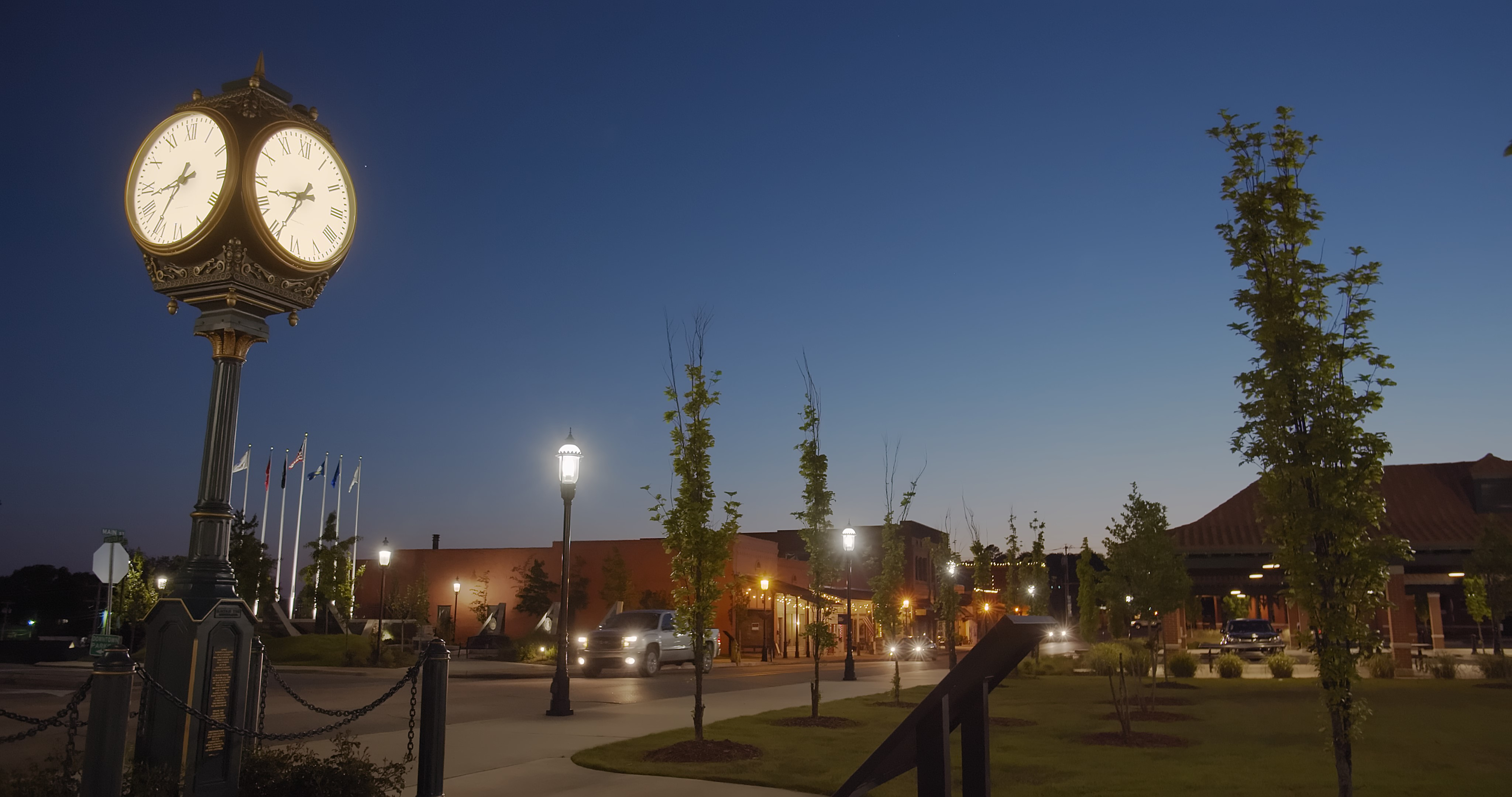
Freedom Park on Main Street, 2022

Van Buren is home to many large corporations within the state and employs a great deal of the city's population within its Port and Industrial Park district. Manufacturing, food processing, and medicine are sustaining industries in Van Buren. Major employers include poultry processor Simmons Foods, the Van Buren School District, USA Truck, and Baptist Health.

== Culture ==
=== Arts and architecture ===
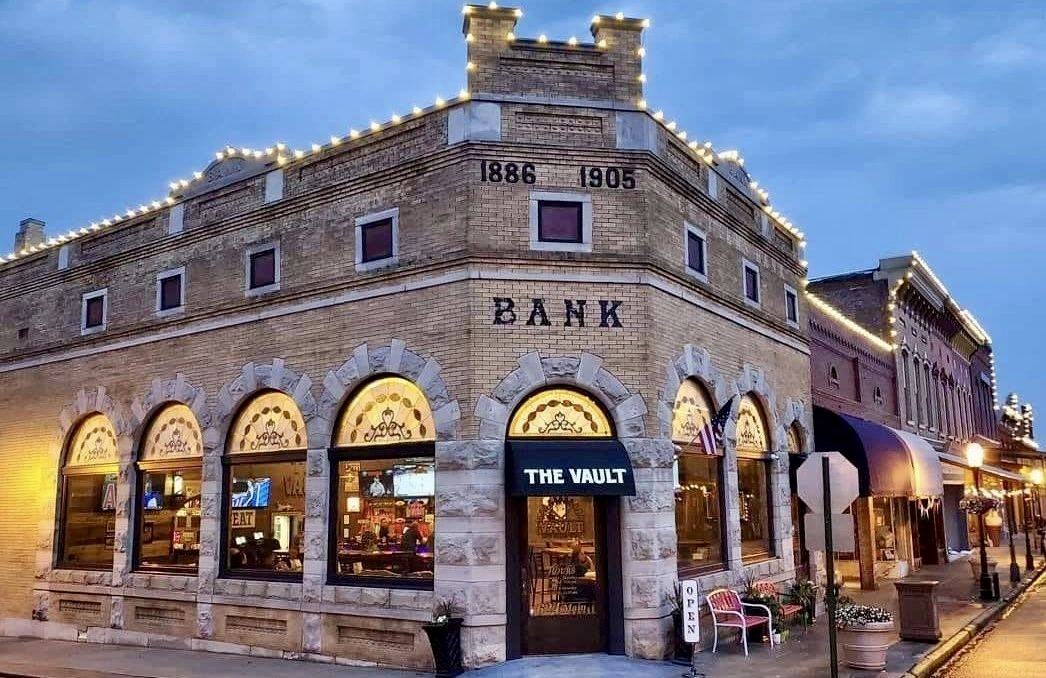
The Vault 1905 Sports Grill, 2022

Van Buren is home of the King Opera House, a Victorian-style performance hall from the late 19th century, part of the old downtown historic area. At the south end of the historical downtown is the Crawford County courthouse, the oldest functioning courthouse west of the Mississippi River. To the north is the Old Frisco Station which was originally a station on the St. Louis-San Francisco Railway, pictured at the top of this page.

=== Media ===
As part of the primary Fort Smith metropolitan area, many Fort Smith based television stations including KHBS and KFSM, whose radio mast is built in Van Buren, provide local news and weather. The city's major newspaper is the Van Buren Press Argus-Courier; however many people also read Fort Smith's Southwest Times Record, as well as the Northwest Edition of the Arkansas Democrat-Gazette.

== Transportation ==
Van Buren's location at the junction of Interstate 40, Interstate 540, and the Arkansas/Oklahoma border yields surprisingly large tourism and hospitality industries. The city is also located at the junction of several state and U.S. highways including Arkansas Highway 59, US 64, and US 71. A private airport, Twin Cities Airport (code 39AR), was operational to the southeast of the city, but has been closed for many years. Modern railroads in the city include the Arkansas and Missouri Railroad and the Union Pacific Railroad. Intercity bus service to the city is provided by Jefferson Lines.

== Education ==
The Van Buren School District is the largest school district in Crawford County, consisting of six elementary schools (grades K-5), two middle schools (grades 6–8), one ninth grade academy (grade 9) and one high school (grades 10–12). The Van Buren High School is in the 5A/6A-West Division of Arkansas high school sports.

== Sites of interest ==
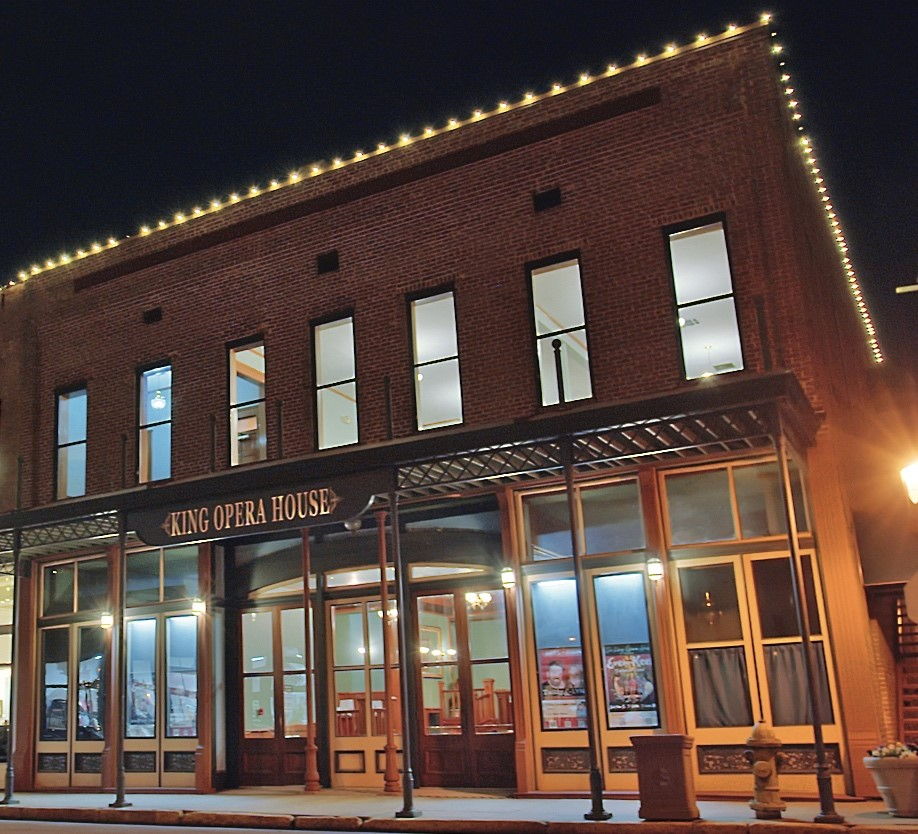
King Opera House, 2022

- Historic Main Street, used for scenes in the film The Blue and the Gray as well as scenes in the film Frank & Jesse
- King Opera House, performance hall and historic landmark
- The Old Frisco Station-Victorian style railroad station; used for a scene in the film Biloxi Blues. It was part of the now defunct St. Louis–San Francisco Railway also known as the Frisco.

== Notable people ==
- Cyrus Adler, Jewish religious leader and scholar
- Bob Burns, comedian and actor
- Ryan Rose, Republican member of the Arkansas House of Representatives from Van Buren
- John Deweese, U.S. representative from North Carolina
- Matt Jones, NFL player
- Shay Mooney, singer songwriter from duo Dan + Shay
- Bass Reeves, American lawman

== See also ==
- Battle of Van Buren
- List of cities and towns in Arkansas
- National Register of Historic Places listings in Crawford County, Arkansas
