= John T. Deweese =

American politician (1835–1906)

John Deweese
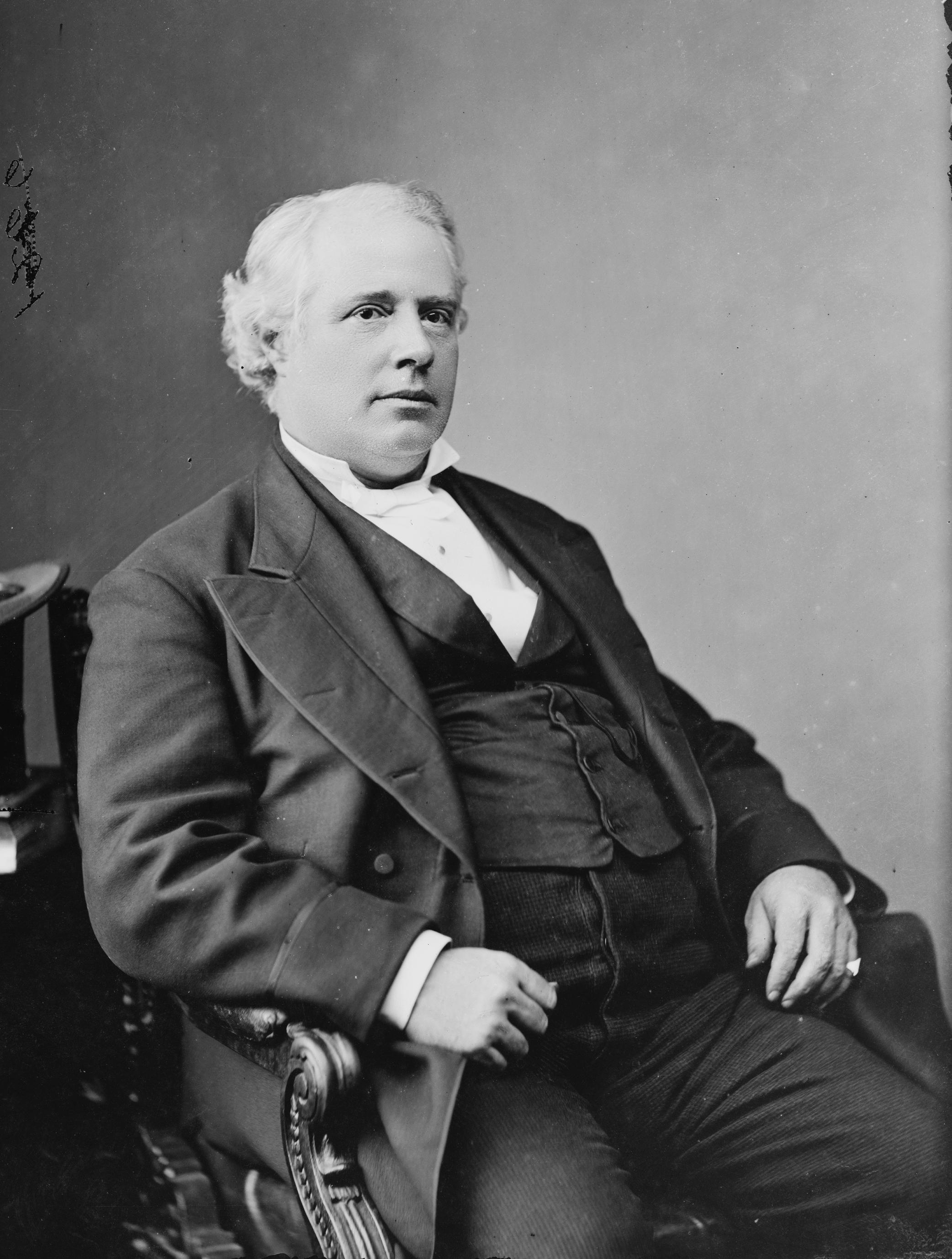

Member of the U.S. House of Representatives from North Carolina's 4th district
- In office July 6, 1868 – February 28, 1870
- Preceded by: Lawrence O'Bryan Branch (1861)
- Succeeded by: Robert B. Gilliam (elect)

Personal details
- Born: John Thomas Deweese; July 4, 1835 Van Buren, Arkansas, U.S.
- Died: July 4, 1906 (aged 71) Washington, D.C., U.S.
- Resting place: Arlington National Cemetery
- Party: Republican (before 1876); Democratic (1876–1906)

Military service
- Branch/service: United States Army (Union Army)
- Years of service: 1861–1867
- Rank: Brevet Brigadier General (USV); Second Lieutenant (USA)
- Unit: United States Volunteers
- Battles/wars: American Civil War

John Thomas Deweese (June 4, 1835 – July 4, 1906) was an American politician of the Republican Party who served as a U.S. representative from North Carolina. Deweese was censured by the House of Representatives in 1870 for selling an appointment to the U.S. Naval Academy.

== Biography ==
Born in Van Buren, Arkansas, on June 4, 1835, Deweese was educated at home, where he studied law; he was admitted to the bar in 1856 and commenced practice in Henderson, Kentucky. He later lived in Denver, Colorado, for some years, but moved to Pike County, Indiana, in 1860.

DeWeese entered the Union Army on July 6, 1861, as second lieutenant of Company E, Twenty-fourth Regiment, Indiana Volunteer Infantry, and served with that command until February 15, 1862, when he resigned. He was quickly mustered in as captain of Company F, Fourth Indiana Cavalry, on August 8, 1862, and was successively promoted to rank of colonel; he was brevetted Brigadier-General of Volunteers effective March 13, 1865. Upon the reorganization of the Army he was appointed second lieutenant, in the Eighth United States Infantry, on July 24, 1866. Following the war, he moved to North Carolina.

Deweese resigned from the Army on August 14, 1867, having been elected to Congress. He was appointed register in bankruptcy for North Carolina in 1868; upon the readmission of North Carolina to the Union, DeWeese was elected as a Republican to the Fortieth and Forty-first Congresses and served from July 6, 1868, to February 28, 1870. During that time, he was the chairman of Committee on Expenditures in the Department of the Interior and on the Committee on Revolutionary Pensions.

Deweese resigned his seat in February 1870 during a congressional investigation. He was censured by the House of Representatives on March 1, 1870, for selling an appointment to the Naval Academy. He then switched parties and became a delegate to the Democratic National Convention in 1876, resumed the practice of law, and died in Washington, D.C., on July 4, 1906. He is interred in Arlington National Cemetery.

== See also ==
- 40th United States Congress
- 41st United States Congress
- List of United States representatives expelled, censured, or reprimanded

U.S. House of Representatives
Vacant Title last held by Lawrence O'Bryan Branch; 1861	Member of the U.S. House of Representatives from North Carolina's 4th congressional district 1868–1870	Succeeded by Robert B. Gilliam; Elect
