= Fairview Cemetery =

Fairview Cemetery may refer to:

== Canada ==
- Fairview Cemetery, Halifax, Nova Scotia
- Fairview Cemetery, Niagara Falls

== United States ==
- Fairview Cemetery (Van Buren, Arkansas), listed on the NRHP in Arkansas
- Fairview Cemetery, Confederate Section, Van Buren, Arkansas
- Fairview Cemetery (Colorado Springs, Colorado) in El Paso County, Colorado
- Fairview Cemetery New Albany, Indiana
- Fairview Cemetery (Boston, Massachusetts), listed on the NRHP in Massachusetts
- Fairview Cemetery (Dalton, Massachusetts), listed on the NRHP in Massachusetts
- Fairview Cemetery (Westford, Massachusetts), listed on the NRHP in Massachusetts
- Fairview Cemetery (Gallatin County, Montana) in Gallatin County, Montana
- Fairview Cemetery (Flathead County, Montana) in Flathead County, Montana
- Fairview Cemetery (Broadwater County, Montana) in Broadwater County, Montana
- Fairview Cemetery (Daniels County, Montana) in Daniels County, Montana
- Fairview Cemetery (Fairview, New Jersey)
- Fairview Cemetery (Westfield, New Jersey)
- Fairview Cemetery (Santa Fe, New Mexico), listed on the NRHP in New Mexico
- Fairview Cemetery (Wahpeton, North Dakota)
- Fairview Cemetery (Pen Argyl, Pennsylvania)
- Fairview Cemetery (Culpeper, Virginia), listed on the NRHP in Virginia
- Fairview Cemetery (Linden, Michigan) in Linden, Michigan
