= Senator Walton (disambiguation) =

George Walton (1749–1804) was a U.S. Senator from Georgia from 1795 to 1796. Senator Walton may also refer to:

- Charles D. Walton (born 1948), Rhode Island State Senate
- Charles W. Walton (New York politician) (1875–1945), New York State Senate
- Moses Walton (1775–1847), Virginia State Senate
- William B. Walton (1871–1939), New Mexico State Senate
