= Edward A. Warren =

American politician

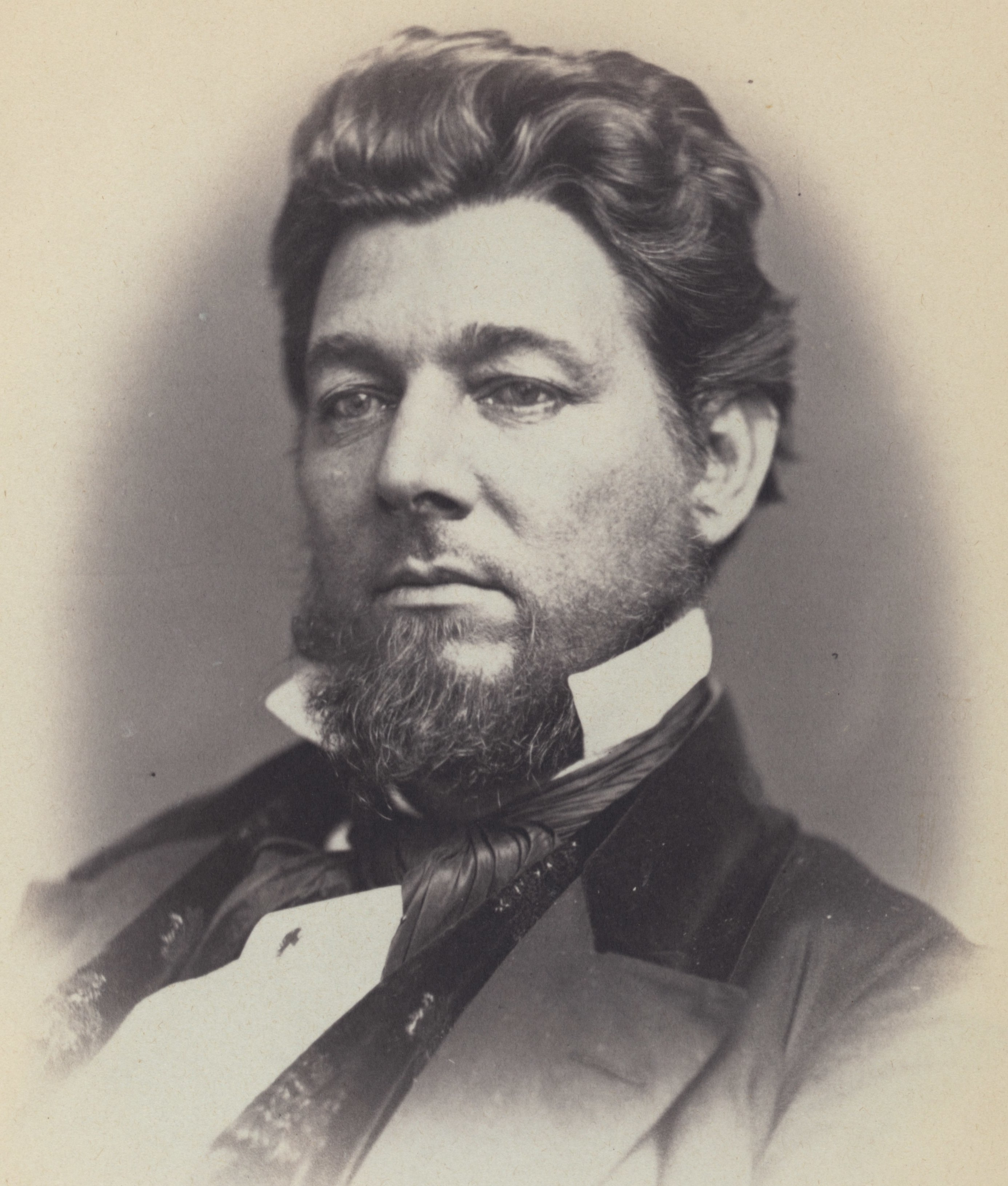

Member of the U.S. House of Representatives from Arkansas's 2nd district
- In office March 4, 1853 – March 3, 1855
- Preceded by: New constituency
- Succeeded by: Albert Rust
- In office March 4, 1857 – March 3, 1859
- Preceded by: Albert Rust
- Succeeded by: Albert Rust

8th Speaker of the Arkansas House of Representatives
- In office November 4, 1848 – November 4, 1850
- Preceded by: John S. Roane
- Succeeded by: T. B. Flournoy

Member of the Arkansas House of Representatives from the Ouachita County district
- In office November 4, 1848 – November 4, 1850 Serving with A. A. Smith
- Preceded by: redistricted

Member of the Mississippi House of Representatives
- In office 1845–1846

Personal details
- Born: Edward Allen Warren; May 2, 1818 Greene County, Alabama, U.S.
- Died: July 2, 1875 (aged 57) Prescott, Arkansas, U.S.
- Resting place: Moscow, Arkansas, U.S. 33°46′35.4″N 93°21′59.6″W
- Party: Democratic

Edward Allen Warren (May 2, 1818 – July 2, 1875) was a U.S. representative from Arkansas.

== Early life and education ==
Edward Allen Warren was born in Greene County, Alabama, on May 2, 1818, to Robert H. Warren and Lydia A. Minter Warren. He received his early education there, and then studied law on his own. He married in October 1838, and he and his wife, Mary Elizabeth Warren, went on to have two children. In 1843, he was admitted to the bar and he began his practice in Clinton, Mississippi.

== Legal and political career ==
In 1845, he was elected to the Mississippi House of Representatives, serving until 1846. In 1847, Warren moved to Camden, Arkansas and opened his law practice there. In 1848, he entered Arkansas politics as a Democrat and was elected to the Arkansas House of Representatives. He served as the House Speaker during the 7th Arkansas General Assembly. Between 1850 and 1851, Warren served as a judge on the Circuit Court of the Sixth District of Arkansas. Warren was elected as a Democrat to the Thirty-third Congress (March 4, 1853 – March 3, 1855). Warren was elected to the Thirty-fifth Congress (March 4, 1857 – March 3, 1859), representing Arkansas's 2nd congressional district.

== Later life and death ==
After his years of government service, Warren devoted the rest of life to his family and to his law practice. On July 2, 1875, Warren died at the residence of his son; E.A. Warren, Jr., in Prescott, Nevada County, Arkansas, and was interred in Moscow Church.

== Legacy ==
In 1876, Warren's son, E.A. Warren Jr., opened 'The Prescott Dispatch' in Prescott, and became Prescott's Mayor in 1881.

== See also ==
- List of speakers of the Arkansas House of Representatives

== Notes ==
U.S. House of Representatives
New constituency	Member of the U.S. House of Representatives from Arkansas's 2nd congressional district 1853 – 1855	Succeeded by Albert Rust
Preceded by Albert Rust	Member of the U.S. House of Representatives from Arkansas's 2nd congressional district 1857 – 1859	Succeeded by Albert Rust
