= George Rust =

American politician

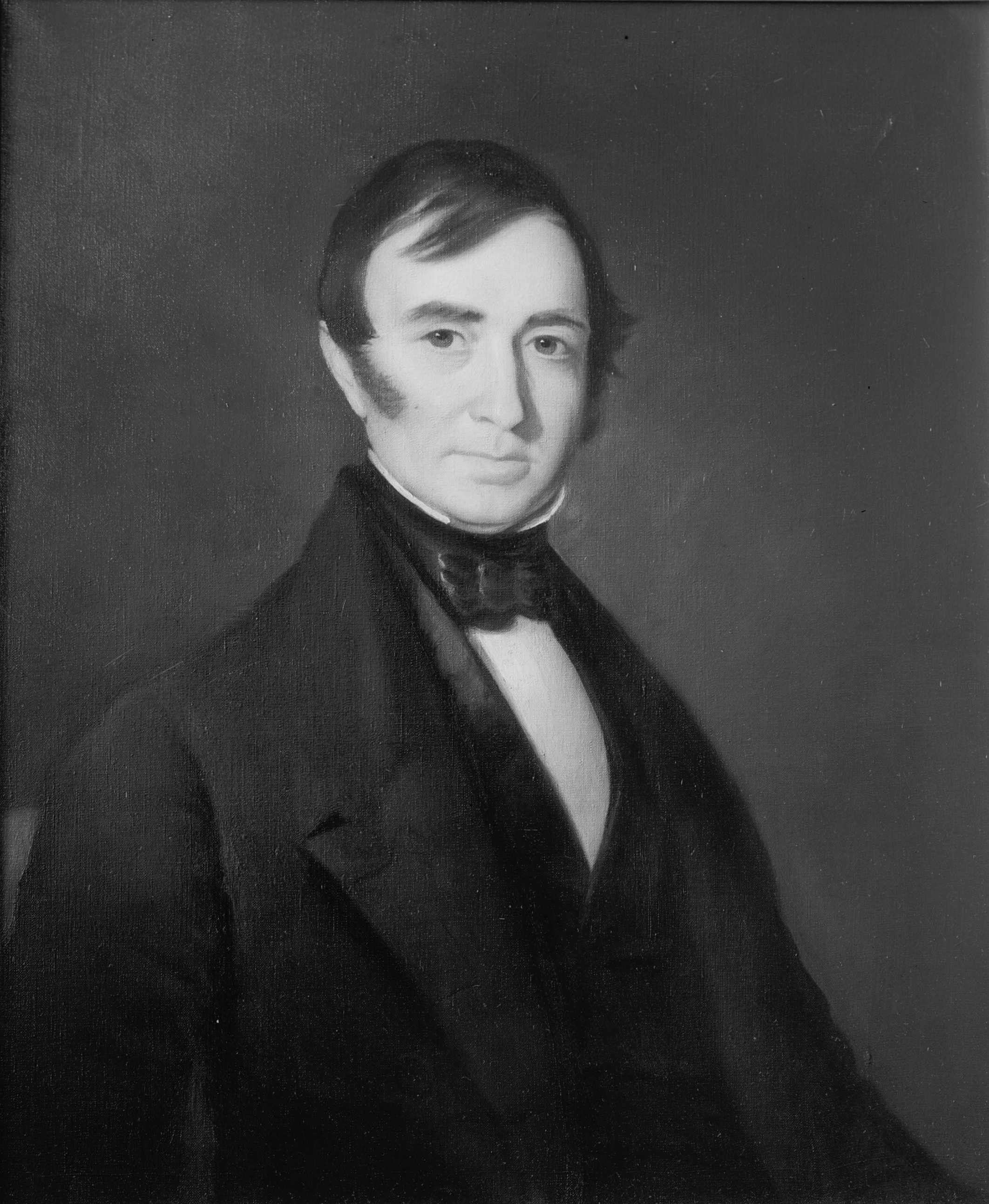

General

Member of the Virginia House of Delegates from the Loudoun County, Virginia district
- In office December 7, 1818 – December 5, 1819 Serving with Robert Braden
- Preceded by: Joseph Lewis Jr.
- Succeeded by: Stephen C. Roszel

Member of the Virginia House of Delegates from the Loudoun County, Virginia district
- In office 1820 – November 30, 1823 Serving with Fayette Ball, Robert Braden, William Chilton
- Preceded by: Stephen C. Roszel
- Succeeded by: Francis Stribling

Personal details
- Born: January 4, 1788 Loudoun County, Virginia, U.S.
- Died: September 18, 1857 (aged 69) Baltimore, Maryland, U.S.
- Occupation: planter, soldier, politician

Military service
- Allegiance: Virginia; United States
- Branch/service: Virginia Militia
- Rank: General (USA)
- Commands: arsenal at Harper's Ferry
- Battles/wars: Battle of Baltimore

George Rust (January 4, 1788 – September 18, 1857) was Virginia plantation owner, soldier and politician. During the War of 1812, Rust helped defend Baltimore, Maryland (where he later owned property and died), and rose to become a general in the Virginia militia, as well as the civilian superintendent of the arsenal at Harper's Ferry.

== Early and family life ==
George Rust was born in Loudoun County, Virginia to George Rust and Elizabeth Rust, and spent part of his childhood in Prince George's County, Maryland. He married Maria Claggett Marlow (d. 1863), and they had nine children, of which seven survived childhood, including Olivia Maria (d. 1844), Mary Virginia (d. 1826), Mary Virginia Rust Yellott (1830–1914), Col. Armistead Thomson Mason Rust (1820–1887), Col. George Thomas Rust (1826–1900), Margaret Rust Bedinger (1818–1843) and Charlotte Rust Rogers (1836–1923).

== Career ==
During the War of 1812, Rust helped defend Baltimore, Maryland during the Battle of Baltimore.

Loudoun County voters elected Rust as one of their two delegates in the Virginia House of Delegates in 1818–1819 (after George McCarty refused to take the oath required by the new Dueling Act) and he served along with experienced delegate Robert Braden. However, both were unseated in the 1819 election, and replaced by Fayette Ball and Stephen C. Roszel. While Ball was re-elected in 1820, so was Rust, and he was re-elected to the part-time position in the following two annual elections, serving until after the 1823 election, alongside William Chilton, then Robert Braden before Francis Stribling became the county's second delegate in the 1823 election.

The Virginia General Assembly elected Rust as a brigadier general for the Virginia militia in 1824, hence his usual honorific. General Rust was a delegate to the Democratic National Convention in 1828 (when he voted for Andrew Jackson) and again in 1852.

Rust was appointed Superintendent of the U.S. Arsenal at Harper's Ferry in February 1830, and retired (still a civilian) from that post in March, 1837. In the middle of his term, the Baltimore and Ohio Railroad reached the opposite shore. Rust also had business investments in Baltimore, including a hat and shoe store in the 1840–1846 and a bank in 1856.

Rust built Rockland near Leesburg, Virginia about 1822. He also owned Exeter, a nearby plantation now destroyed. He and Albert Rust also bought "Indian Town", a plantation in Lancaster County, Virginia in 1856. 1850 Census records show that George Rust owned 33 slaves in Loudon County, VA.

== Death and legacy ==
General Rust died in Baltimore, Maryland on September 18, 1857. His papers are at the Library of Virginia. Other family papers are in collections of Leesburg's Thomas Balch Library, and in Arkansas.

Several of Rust's relatives served in the Confederate Army or legislature during the American Civil War. His nephew and business partner Albert Rust, who had moved to Arkansas and became a legislator, rose to become a Confederate general and fought many battles in Virginia, as well as spent many of his later years there. George Rust's son Colonel Armistead Thomson Mason Rust (1820–1887), a West Point graduate, fought with the 19th Virginia Infantry and inherited Rockland. Another relative, Dr. George W. Rust, served as a physician in various Confederate Hospitals as well as in the Virginia House of Delegates and Virginia Constitutional Convention of 1868.

The home that General Rust built, Rockland, remains owned by his descendants, was expanded by his grandson, listed on the National Register of Historic Places and has now become an event venue with several outbuildings as well as farm fields. However, the overseer's house on that estate is now owned separately.
