= Exeter (Leesburg, Virginia) =

Historic house in Virginia, United States

- Formerly listed on the U.S. National Register of Historic Places
- Virginia Landmarks Register
- Location within Northern Virginia Location within Virginia Location within the United States
- Nearest city: Leesburg, Virginia
- Coordinates: 39°07′25″N 77°32′55″W
- Area: 37 acres (15 ha)
- Built: 1790
- Demolished: August 1980
- NRHP reference No.: 73002032
- VLR No.: 053-0077, 253-5019

Significant dates
- Added to NRHP: August 14, 1973
- Removed from NRHP: March 19, 2001

Exeter was a late 18th-century Georgian house near Leesburg, Virginia, that was listed on the National Register of Historic Places from 1973 to August 1980, when it was destroyed by fire and subsequently de-listed from the National Register. The house and its dependencies were unusually elaborate for northern Virginia.

== History ==
The house was built about 1790 by Dr. Wilson Cary Selden of the Selden family on a property that he had inherited from his first wife, Mary Mason Selden, who was a niece of George Mason. Selden and his second wife, Eleanor Love Selden, expanded the property as the centerpiece of a plantation. In 1835, Selden's son Wilson Cary Selden, Jr. inherited the property, but sold it in 1846 to General George Rust, who expanded the house to the rear. The property played a role in the American Civil War when the Battle of Ball's Bluff was fought on the plantation's lands, with Confederate General Jubal Early using the house as a headquarters. The house had fallen into disrepair by the 1970s, and was destroyed by fire in August 1980.

== Description ==
Exeter was a seven-part house. It was dominated by a two-story tetrastyle Ionic portico with Chinese Chippendale railings on the upper level, added in the 1830s to replace a one-story pedimented portico. The portico was flanked by single recessed bays, then by hyphens recessed farther back, and finally by small pavilions on either end. The mass of the house was reduced by a gambrel roof on the upper story. The interior featured an entrance hall with a stair hall behind, with a parlor to the south and a dining room to the north. Three main bedrooms were upstairs. The house retained most of its original woodwork. An 1850s addition housed additional rooms to the rear. A number of outbuildings surrounded the house, one of which has been restored as a community center. A barn was demolished to construct the bypass for U.S. Route 15.

Exeter was placed on the National Register of Historic Places on August 14, 1973, and was de-listed after its destruction by fire in August 1980.
