= 1st Arkansas Infantry Regiment (Confederate) =

Infantry regiment of the Confederate States Army

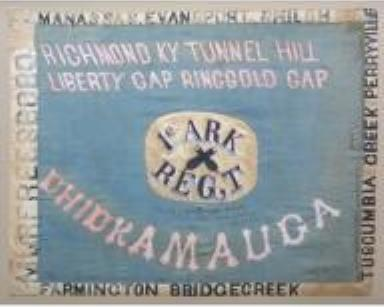
- Regimental color of the First Arkansas at the Old State House Museum in Little Rock, Arkansas
- Active: 1861–1865
- Disbanded: May 1, 1865
- Country: Confederate States
- Allegiance: Arkansas
- Branch: Army
- Role: Infantry
- Size: Regiment
- Nickname: "First Arkansas"
- Facings: Light blue
- Battles: American Civil War; Battle of First Manassas; Battle of Shiloh; Siege of Corinth; Battle of Perryville; Battle of Murfreesboro; Battle of Liberty Gap; Battle of Chickamauga; Battle of Missionary Ridge; Battle of Ringgold Gap; Battle of Rocky Face Ridge; Battle of Resaca; Battle of New Hope Church; Battle of Kennesaw Mountain; Battle of Peachtree Creek; Battle of Jonesboro; Battle of Spring Hill; Battle of Franklin; Battle of Nashville; Battle of Bentonville

Commanders
- Notable commanders: Col. James F. Fagan

The 1st Arkansas Infantry Regiment, commonly known as the "First Arkansas", was an infantry formation of the Confederate States Army in the Western Theater of the American Civil War.

The regiment was raised in April 1861 by Colonel Thompson B. Flournoy. It moved first to Virginia, but transferred back to Tennessee and served the rest of the war in the western theater, seeing action in the Kentucky, Tennessee and Georgia campaigns. Following its depletion in numbers, the regiment was consolidated several times with other Arkansas regiments, finally merging in 1865 into the 1st Arkansas Consolidated Infantry Regiment. There were three regiments known as "1st Arkansas" during the war.

The second unit with the designation of "1st Arkansas" was the 1st Infantry, Arkansas State Troops, which was mustered into Confederate service at Pitman's Ferry, Arkansas, on 23 July 1861, under the command of Colonel Patrick Cleburne; this unit was eventually redesignated as the 15th Arkansas Volunteer Infantry. The third unit bearing the title "1st Arkansas" was the 1st Arkansas Volunteer Infantry, which served with the Union Army.

== Formation ==
The 1st Arkansas regiment began its organization in April 1861, before Arkansas had even seceded from the Union. The first Arkansas Secession Convention had convened in March and voted against secession. On 12 April, Confederate forces under General P. G. T. Beauregard bombarded Fort Sumter, forcing its capitulation. President Abraham Lincoln called upon the "militia of the several states" to provide 75,000 troops to put down the rebellion. Governor Henry Rector famously refused Lincoln's request for troops. Upon learning of Rector's refusal, Confederate Secretary of War, L.P. Walker, immediately wrote to Governor Rector on behalf of the Confederate Government at Montgomery and requested that the state provide a regiment for the Confederacy.

MONTGOMERY,

Gov. HENRY M. RECTOR, Little Rock, Ark.: SIR: Your patriotic response to the requisition of the President of the United States for troops to coerce the Confederate States justifies the belief that your people are prepared to unite with us in repelling the common enemy of the South. Virginia needs our aid. I there- fore request you to furnish one regiment of infantry without delay, to rendezvous at Lynchburg, Va. It must consist of ten companies, of not less than sixty-four men each. The regiment will be entitled to one colonel, one lieutenant-colonel, one major, one adjutant from the line of lieutenants, one~ sergeant-major from the enlisted men. Each company is entitled to one captain, one first lieutenant, two second lieutenants, four sergeants, four corporals, and two musicians. The officers, except the staff officers, are to be appointed in the manner prescribed by the law of your State. Staff officers are appointed by the President; the term of service not less than twelve months, unless sooner discharged. They will be mustered into the service at Lynch- burg, but transportation and subsistence will be provided from the point of departure. They will furnish their own uniform, but will receive its value in commutation. You have arms and ammunition with which to supply them. Answer and say whether you will comply with this request, and, if so, when.

L.P. Walker
Secretary of War

Governor Rector initially responded that he had no power to comply with the Confederate request but he expected the state to secede when the secession convention reconvened on 6 May. He stated that after secession the state could and would aid the Confederacy. Governor Rector sent another dispatch requesting to know if the Confederacy would accept a regiment raised by T. B. Flournoy, as Colonel, John B. Thompson as Lieutenant Colonel, and W.N. Brougnah and James. B. Johnson. Further, Governor Rector agreed to arm and equip the regiment when it rendezvoused at Little Rock Arsenal. Thompson B. Flournoy was a planter from Laconia, in Desha County, and had supported the Douglas and Johnson ticket in the election of 1860.

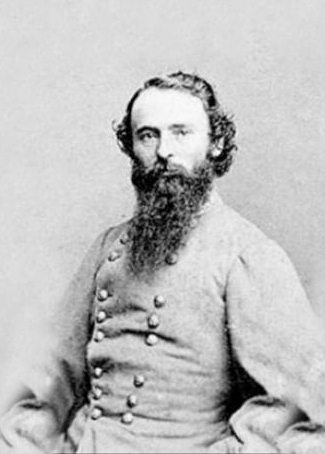
Col. James F. Fagan, 1st Arkansas Volunteer Infantry Regiment

Colonel Flournoy began by organizing the first companies which arrived in Little Rock seeking service in the Confederate forces. Many of these initial companies had originally been organized as volunteer companies under the Arkansas Militia law which authorized each county to form, in addition to the standard militia regiment, up to four volunteer companies, one each of Rifles, Infantry, Artillery and Cavalry. Units such as the DeWitt Guards from Arkansas County and the Jackson Guards from Jackson County had organized months earlier in the state militia as sectional frictions increased. At the actual organization of the regiment at Little Rock on 6 May 1861, Flournoy was defeated for the colonelcy, and Captain James F. Fagan, of Saline County, was elected colonel; Capt. James C. Monroe, of Clark County, was elected lieutenant-colonel, and John Baker Thompson, major. Prof. Frank Bronaugh, of the military department of St. John's College, Little Rock, was chosen adjutant. Flournoy accepted the outcome with good grace; he was afterward promoted to brigadier-general in the Confederate service. The unit was composed of companies from the following Arkansas counties:

- Company A – "The El Dorado Sentinels" – of Union County, commanded by Capt. Asa Morgan. This unit was likely first organized as the El Dorado Troop, a volunteer cavalry company in the 29th Regiment, Arkansas State Militia, on February 15, 1861.
- Company B – "The Clark County Volunteers" – of Clark County, commanded by Capt. Charles Stark.
- Company C – "The Camden Knights" – of Ouachita County, commanded by Capt. Crenshaw. This company had originally been organized as a volunteer company in the 39th Regiment, Arkansas State Militia on April 29, 1861.
- Company D – "The Clan McGregor" – of Jefferson County, commanded by Capt. Donelson McGregor. McGregor had been elected as the Colonel of the 24th Regiment, Arkansas State Militia, on February 22, 1860, and probably organized his company from his militia regiment.
- Company E – "The Saline Guards" – of Saline County, commanded by Capt. William A. Crawford.
- Company F – "The Ettomon Guards" – of Pulaski County, commanded by Capt. William H. Martin.
- Company G – "The Jackson Guards" – of Jackson County, commanded by Capt. A. C. Pickett. This company had originally been organized as a volunteer company in the 34th Regiment, Arkansas State Militia on March 8, 1860.
- Company H – "The Crockett Rifles" – of Arkansas County, commanded by Capt. Robert H. Crockett.
- Company I – "The Monticello Guards" – of Drew County, commanded by Capt. James Jackson.
- Company K – "The DeWitt Guards" – of Arkansas County, commanded by Capt. D. B. Quertermous. This company had originally been organized as a volunteer company in the 1st Regiment, Arkansas State Militia, on February 8, 1861.

The regiment was sent to Lynchburg, Virginia, for training the same month it was accepted into the Confederate ranks.

== History ==
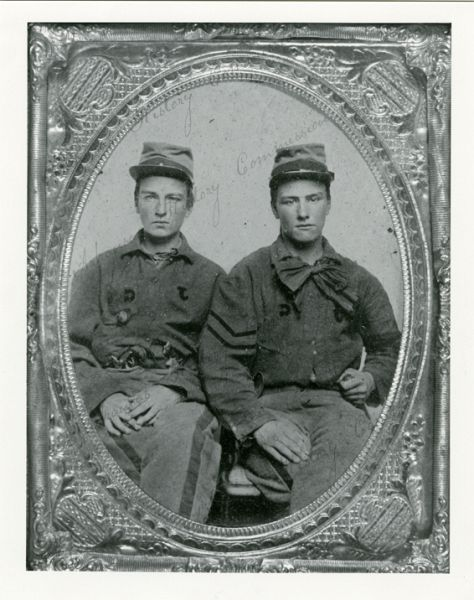
Privates Henry Clements and John McKamie Wilson Baird, of the "Jackson Guards", a prewar volunteer militia company which became Company G, 1st Arkansas

The regiment attracted attention on the road from Arkansas to Virginia, as folks along the way learned that it contained the offspring of two famous Tennessee families. Capt. Robert Patton Crockett a son of Davy Crockett & second wife Elizabeth Patton, and Capt. Donelson McGregor, who was reared near the Hermitage, and was grand-nephew of the President Andrew Jackson. The regiment was stationed at Aquia Creek, near Fredericksburg, Virginia, in the brigade of Gen. T. H. Holmes. The regiment was mustered into Confederate service on 19 May 1861, at Lynchburg, Virginia. It was then stationed at Evansport, where the men of the regiment, under Capt. Will H. Martin, made an unsuccessful attempt to capture the Federal gunboat Pocahontas, on the Potomac. In July 1861, Holme's Brigade served as the reserve for Confederate General P.G.T. Beauregard's Confederate Army of the Potomac during the battle of First Manassas, but the 1st Arkansas never became engaged.

In February 1862 they were transferred and attached to the Army of Mississippi under the command of General P.G.T. Beauregard, and fought at the Battle of Shiloh. The 1st Arkansas was attached to Colonel Randall L. Gibson's 1st Brigade of Brigadier General Daniel Ruggles' 1st Division of Major General Braxton Bragg's II Army Corps. It was at Shiloh that they became best known, mainly due to the heavy casualties they sustained. Entering the battle with a force of just over 800, they took 364 casualties, 45 percent of their force.

Following that battle, they were reorganized and received replacements, then were assigned to Army of Mississippi for the upcoming Kentucky Campaign, the 1st Arkansas was assigned to Colonel Samuel Powel's 3rd Brigade of Brigadier General James Patton Anderson's 2nd Division of Major General William Joseph Hardee's Corps. After the battle of Perryville, the Army of Mississippi and the Army of Kentucky were reorganized and renamed as the Army of Tennessee and the 1st Arkansas was assigned to Brigadier General Lucius E. Polk's Brigade of Major General Patrick R. Cleburne's Division of Lieutenant General William Joseph Hardee's Corps with whom they would remain for the rest of the war.

The 1st Arkansas would go on to take part in the Battle of Murfreesboro, the Battle of Chickamauga, the Battles for Chattanooga, and the Siege of Atlanta. Lieutenant Colonel Donelson McGregor and fourteen others soldiers for the Battle of Murfreesboro As of result of high casualties during the Chattanooga campaign, the 1st Arkansas was consolidated with the 15th Arkansas under the command of Lieutenant Colonel William H. Martin. This consolidation united the two units that had been designated "1st Arkansas" because upon its formation, the 15th Arkansas had originally been designated by the Arkansas State Military Board as the 1st Arkansas Infantry, State Troops.

During the Battle of Kennesaw Mountain on June 27, 1864, the 1st/15th Arkansas became involved in a famous humanitarian act. At one point in the battle, not far from the position known as the "Dead Angle", the Union frontal assault had failed leaving hundreds of dead and wounded Union soldiers between the Confederate works and the Union lines. The woods and brush between the two armies caught fire because of the gunfire and artillery. The fire began to creep toward the wounded soldiers. Lt. Colonel William P. Martin who was commanding the 1st and 15th combined Arkansas Regiments, jumped on the earthworks and ordered his Confederate soldiers to cease firing. He then waved a white flag of truce yelling to the Union soldiers to "come and get your wounded, they are burning to death." For a short time the Union and Confederate soldiers helped remove the wounded and put out the fires. The next day the Union generals presented Martin with two Colt Revolvers as a thank you for his humanitarian efforts. Later the opposing forces began to fire at each other again.

The regiment and it colors were captured, along with much of Govan's Brigade at the Battle of Jonesboro, Georgia, on Sept. 1, 1864. Due to a special cartel between Union General William T. Sherman and Confederate General John B. Hood, the unit was quickly paroled and exchanged for Union prisoner held at Andersonville Prison. The regiment re-entered service approximately a month later. The 1st/15th reported 15 killed, 67 wounded, and 3 missing during the Battle of Atlanta.

The regiment and the rest of Govan's Brigade were released and exchanged just in time to participate in General John B. Hood's disastrous Franklin-Nashville Campaign. Due to the losses suffered by Govan's Brigade during the Atlanta Campaign, the 1st/15th, 5th/13th and 2nd/24th Arkansas Regiments were consolidated into one regiment, which was commanded by Colonel Peter Green of the 5th/13th (specifically of the 5th). The other officers of the consolidated regiment were Major Alexander T. Meek, of the 2nd/24th Arkansas, Captain Mordecai P. Garrett and Sergeant Major Thomas Benton Moncrief of the 15th Arkansas. The consolidated regiment fought under the colors of the consolidated 5th/13th Arkansas Regiment, because this was one of the few colors not captured when Govan's Brigade was overrun at the Battle of Jonesboro. The flag of the combined 5th/13th Arkansas was issued in March 1864 and was captured by Benjamin Newman of the 88th Illinois Infantry at the battle of Franklin. The consolidated regiment numbered 300 rifles and sustained 66% casualties during the Battle of Franklin.

The remnants of Govan's Brigade that survived the Tennessee Campaign remained with the Army of Tennessee through its final engagements in the 1865 Carolinas campaign. The Confederacy had only one award for valor, the Confederate Roll of Honor. Twenty-seven soldiers of the 1st Arkansas Infantry were inscribed into the roll during the war, as the Confederacy lacked the funds to manufacture medals.

The remnants of ten depleted Arkansas regiments, along with one mostly-Arkansas regiment, in the Army of Tennessee were consolidated into a single regiment at Smithfield, North Carolina, on 9 April 1865. The 1st Arkansas, was lumped together with the 2nd, 5th, 6th, 7th, 8th, 15th, 19th and 24th Arkansas Infantry Regiments and the 3rd Confederate Infantry Regiment as the 1st Arkansas Consolidated Infantry on 9 April 1865. On 26 April 1865, the regiment was present with the Army of Tennessee when it surrendered in Greensboro, North Carolina.

== Battles ==
The 1st Arkansas Infantry Regiment took part in the following engagements:

- First Battle of Bull Run, Virginia, July 21, 1861
- Battle of Shiloh, Tennessee, April 6–7, 1862.
- Siege of Corinth, April to June 1862.
- Battle of Perryville, Kentucky, October 8, 1862.
- Battle of Murfreesboro, Tennessee, December 31, 1862, to January 3, 1863.
- Battle of Liberty Gap, Tennessee, June 24–26, 1863.
- Battle of Chickamauga, Georgia, September 19–20, 1863.
- Battle of Missionary Ridge, Tennessee, November 25, 1863.
- Battle of Ringgold Gap, Georgia, November 27, 1863.
- Battle of Rocky Face Ridge, Georgia, May 5–11, 1864.
- Battle of Resaca, Georgia, May 14–15, 1864.
- Battle of New Hope Church, Georgia, May 25 to June 4, 1864.
- Battle of Kennesaw Mountain, Georgia, June 27, 1864.
- Battle of Peachtree Creek, Georgia, July 20, 1864.
- Battle of Jonesboro, Georgia, August 31 to September 1, 1864.
- Battle of Spring Hill, Tennessee, November 29, 1864.
- Battle of Franklin, Tennessee, November 30, 1864.
- Battle of Nashville, Tennessee, December 15–16, 1864.
- Battle of Bentonville, North Carolina, March 19–21, 1865.

== Regimental colors ==
There are currently three flags associated with the 1st Arkansas known to be in existence, two 1st National Flag patterns, one issued to the Jacksonport Guards with another being made in Paraclifta, Arkansas and a Hardee Pattern Flag which was carried by the Consolidated 1st/15th Arkansas during the Atlanta Campaign.

On 5 May 1861, Lieutenant Sydney S. Gause, of the local volunteer militia company, the "Jackson County", received a 1st National Flag Pattern flag, bearing a blue panel on the white stripe, with the words, "LADIES OF JACKSONPORT TO THE JACKSON GUARDS". The flag measured 59" by 110", with a circle of eight stars, with a ninth star in the center of the circle. The flag was utilized as the regimental colors of the 1st Arkansas while the regiment was in Virginia in the summer of 1861. It is now in the collection of the Museum of the Confederacy, Richmond, Virginia.

The final surviving battle flag of the First Arkansas includes one made in 1861 by the ladies of Paraclifta, Arkansas for a First Arkansas Company. The canton, stars and white stripe are made of cotton while the two red stripes are made of damask. The flag measures 46 x 69 inches. Like the previous 1st national pattern, this flag too was returned to the state by the government in 1905.

The Hardee Pattern Flag which represented the 1st/15th Consolidated Arkansas Infantry Regiments during the Atlanta Campaign is a cotton and wool flag with faded blue field. The central device is a white disc with black crossed cannons in the center (each 3 1/2" wool). Designation lettering is 2" Capitol Romans with red shadow: 1st ARK. REG'T. Honors lettering on the field above the disc is 2 1/2" tall Capital Romans: RICHMOND, KY, TUNNELL HILL, LIBERTY GAP, RINGGOLD GAP. Honors lettering below the disc are gold, ornate, 4" letters: CHICKAMAUGA, border is white with black capitol Romans: MANASSAS, EVANSPORT, SHILOH, TUSCUMBIA CREEK, PERRYVILLE, FARMINGTON, BRIDGECREEK, MURFREESBORO. All lettering is painted. Captured by the 14th Michigan Infantry at Jonesboro, Georgia, on 1 September 1864. Returned to the State of Arkansas in 1905 by the U.S. War Department. Currently in the collection of the Old State House Museum, Little Rock, Arkansas.

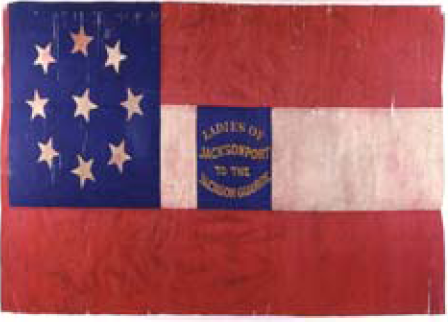
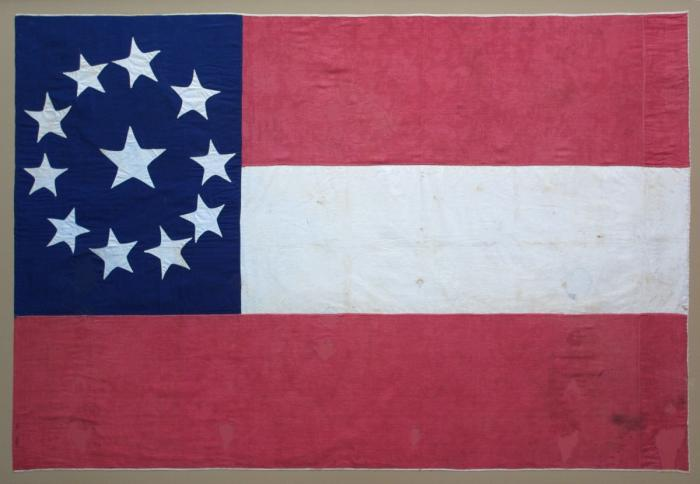
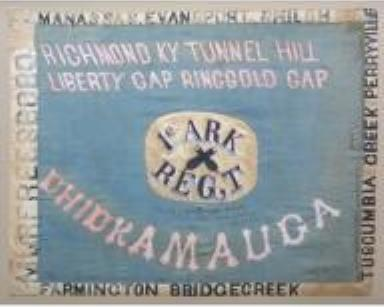
National Color of the First Arkansas	National Color of the First Arkansas	Regimental Color of the First Arkansas

== See also ==
- List of Confederate units from Arkansas

== Bibliography ==
- Gingles, Violet. "Saline County, First Arkansas Infantry Volunteers, C.S.A." Arkansas Historical Quarterly, 18 (Summer 1959): 90–98*Harrell, John M. "Confederate Military History, a library of Confederate States", Military History: Volume 10.2, Arkansas Clement Anselm Evans, Ed.,
- Sikakis, Stewart, Compendium of the Confederate Armies, Florida and Arkansas, Facts on File, Inc., 1992, ISBN 978-0-8160-2288-5,
- Sutherland, Daniel E., ed. Reminiscences of a Private: William E. Bevens of the First Arkansas Infantry, C.S.A. (Fayetteville, AR: University of Arkansas Press, 1992).
- United States. War Dept. The War of the Rebellion: A Compilation of the Official Records of the Union And Confederate Armies.
