= White's Ferry =

Ferry crossing the Potomac River

Coordinates: 39°9′17.26″N 77°31′13.50″W

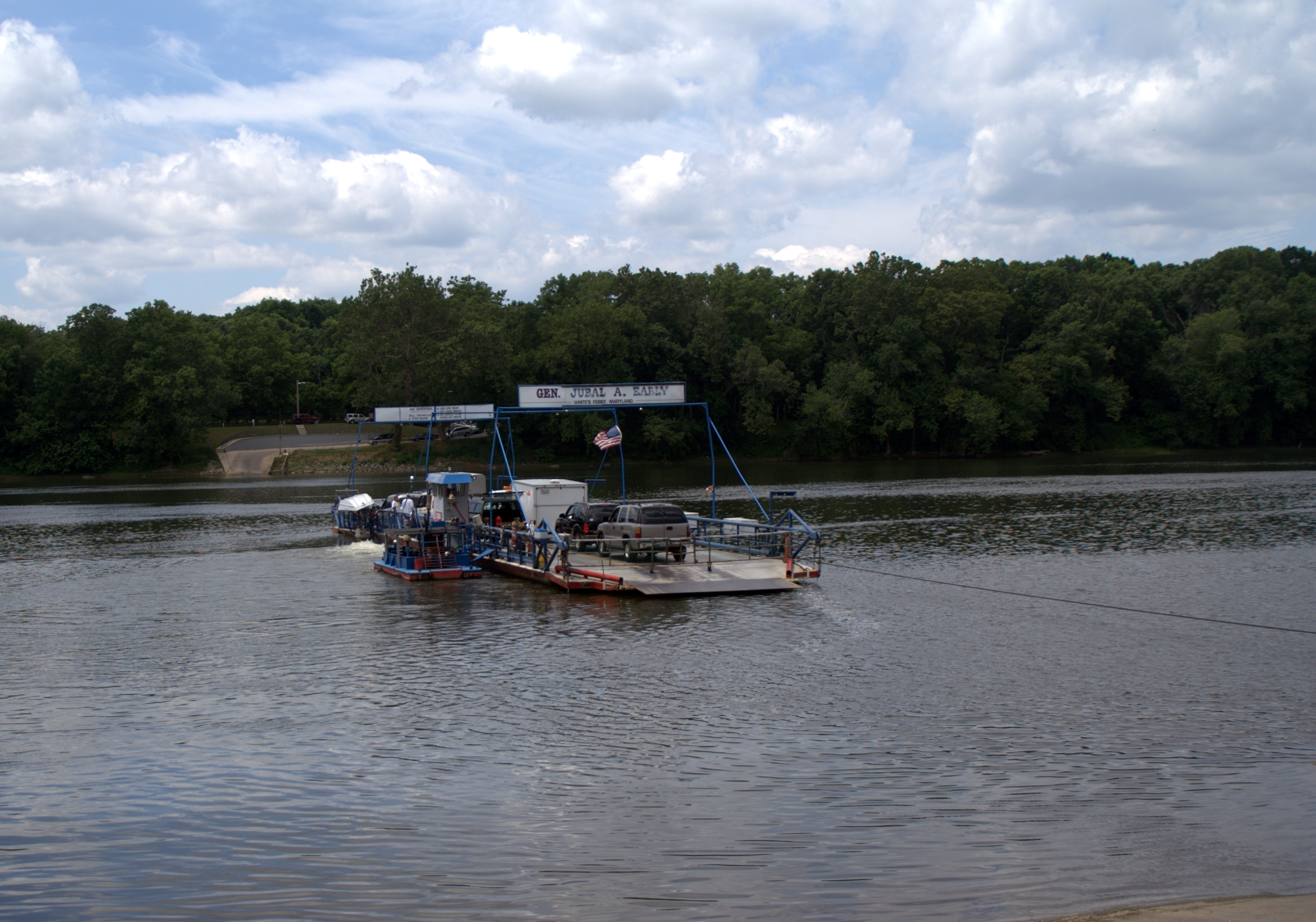
- White's Ferry on the Potomac River in 2007
- Locale: Loudoun County, Virginia and Montgomery County, Maryland
- Waterway: Potomac River
- Transit type: Cable ferry
- Owner: Chuck Kuhn
- Operator: White's Ferry, Inc.
- Began operation: 1786
- Ended operation: December 28, 2020
- Daily ridership: 600–800 customers

White's Ferry, originally Conrad's Ferry, is an inactive cable ferry service that carried cars, bicycles, and pedestrians across the Potomac River between Loudoun County, Virginia and Montgomery County, Maryland, and is the last one of its kind to cross the Potomac. The location offered fishing services and water recreation including canoeing. It transported between 600 and 800 customers daily until its operations were suspended indefinitely in 2020 due to a legal dispute over use of its Virginia landing.

== History ==
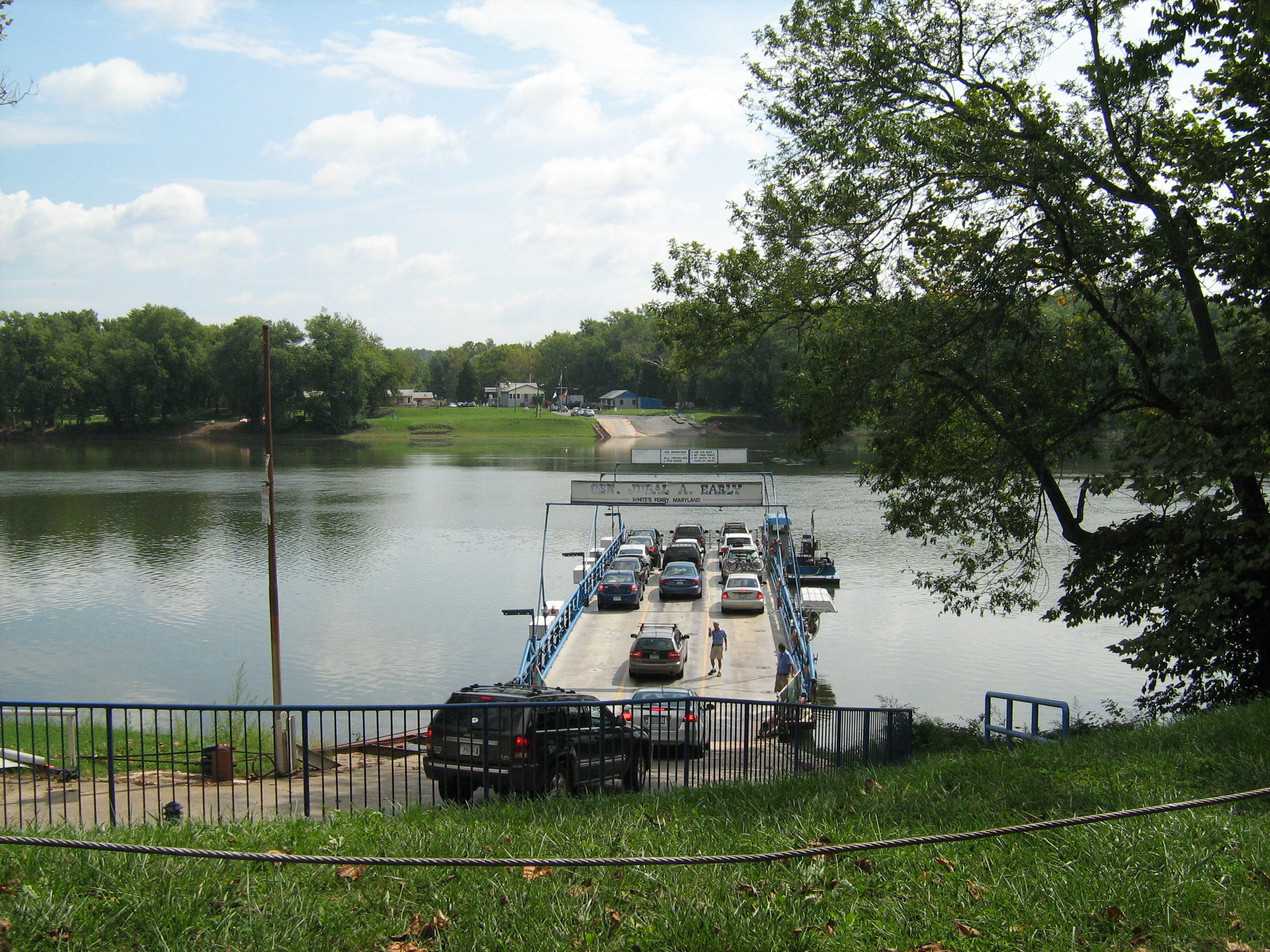
Loading on the Virginia side, with a view of the Maryland side

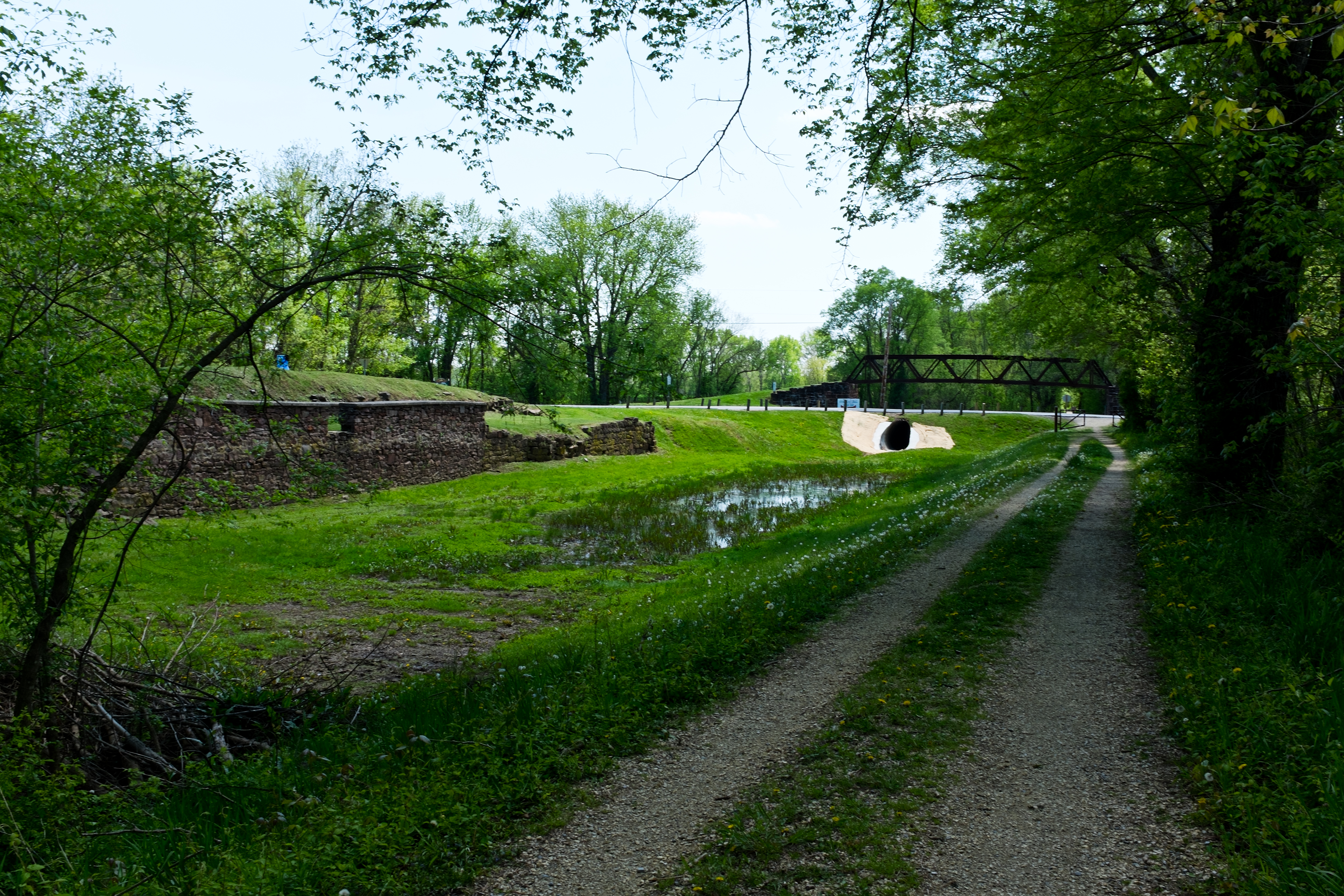
White's Ferry Road crosses the Chesapeake and Ohio Canal, with stone ruins of the granary on the left

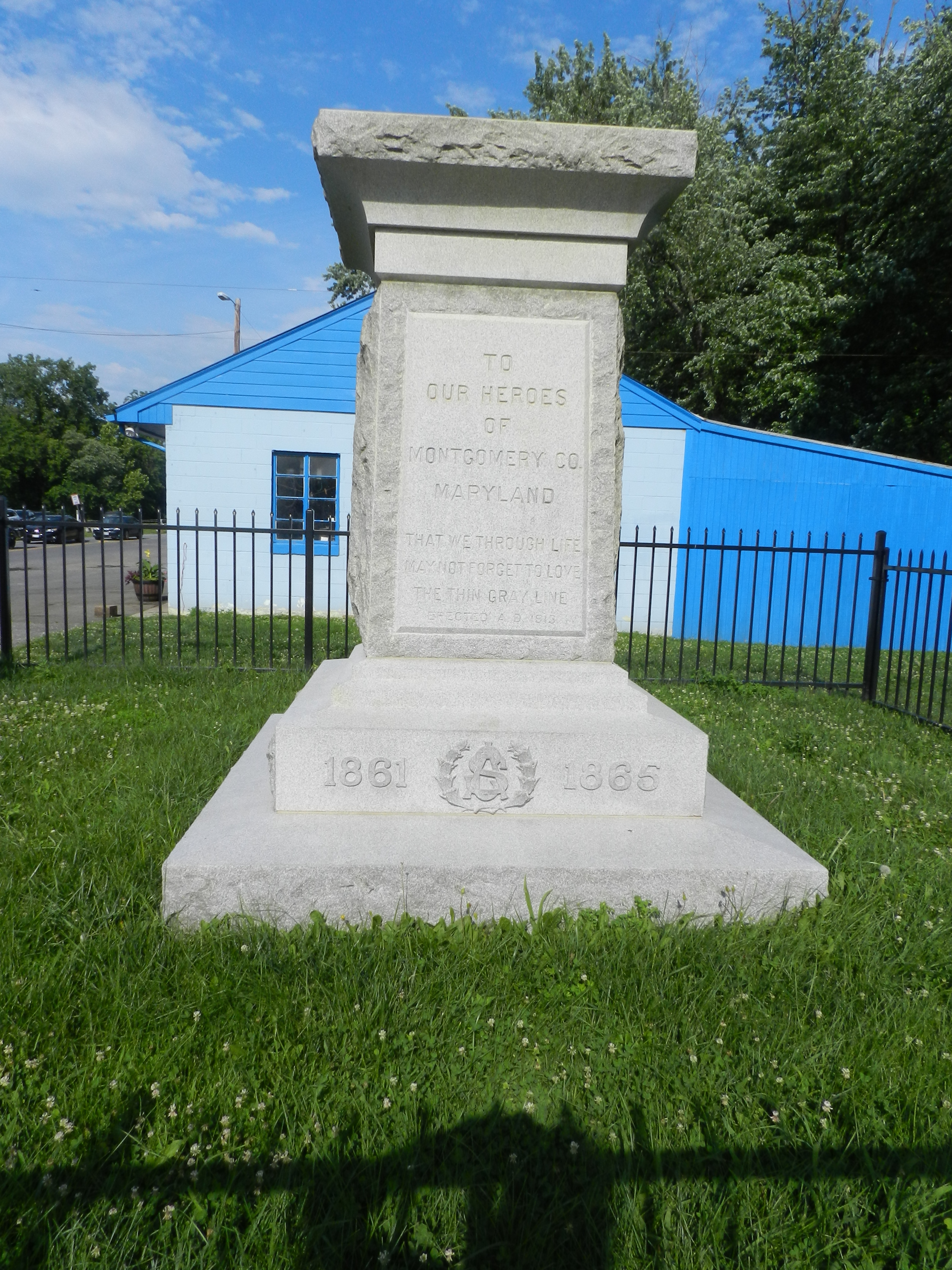
The base of the CSA monument moved from Rockville to White's Ferry

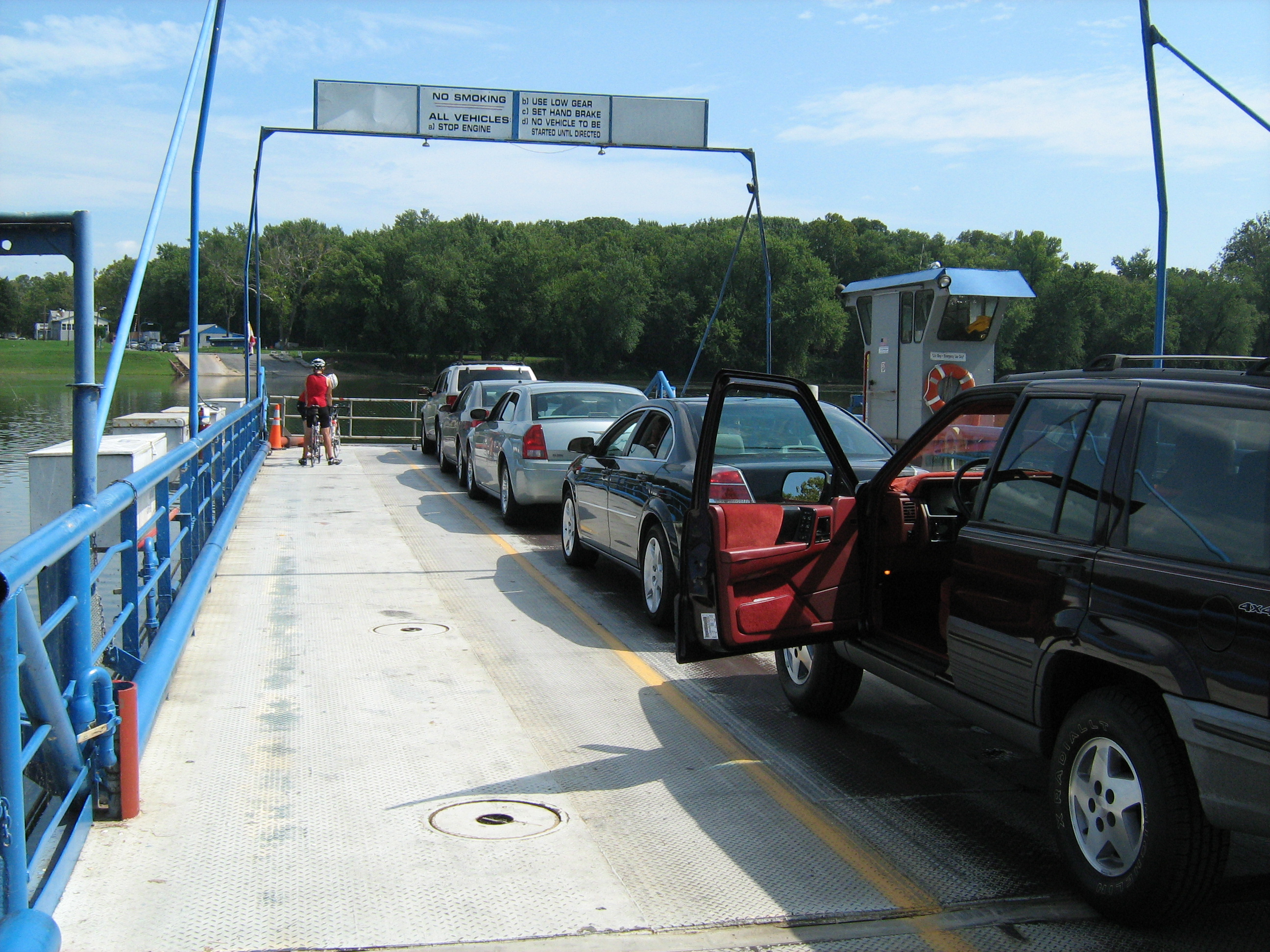
Crossing on the ferry

Early settlers recognized that the relatively still waters of the Potomac River at the location would provide an ideal location for a ferry. One of the earliest mentions of the ferry appeared in an act of the Maryland General Assembly passed on December 27, 1791 (Liber JG. No. 1, folio 447):

Be it enacted, by the General Assembly of Maryland, that the following roads shall be laid out, surveyed, marked, bounded, and cleared in the manner herein directed, to wit: One road through Anne-Arundel county from the turnpike road in Baltimore county until it intersects the road from Frederick-town at the line of Frederick county, near William Hobbs's; one other road from Green's bridge, on Patuxent river, to the mouth of Monocacy, on Potowmack river, through Montgomery county; and one other road from Conrad Myer's ferry on Potowmack river aforesaid, until it intersects the road from Green's bridge aforesaid, to the mouth of Monocacy aforesaid, southwestward of the road leading from Frederick to George-town in Montgomery county aforesaid; and one other road from Conrad Myer's ferry on Potowmack river to the mouth of Seneca, or to intersect the road from Georgetown to the mouth of Monocacy, by way of Brooke Beall's mill on Watt's branch, in Montgomery county.

A road map published in the Maryland Land Records for Montgomery County in 1795 (Liber F-6, folio 195) showed a side road near Seneca Bridge coming off the main road between Georgetown and the mouth of the Monocacy River labeled "Road to Conrad Mire's ferry." Another early mention of the ferry appeared in the book: "The life and adventures of Robert Bailey, from his infancy up to December 1821" written by himself: "From the house of this good man, I crossed at Conrood's ferry, and went to Montgomery County, in Maryland, where I once more (after an absence of nearly six years,) had the heart feeling gratification of beholding my dear and affectionate mother and my kind and loving sister." Assuming the book is chronological, the crossing apparently took place after December 15, 1778. But, "The Moco Show" claims that the ferry was opened to the public in 1786. The following advertisement appeared in the National Intelligencer on Thursday, February 1, 1821: "Ranaway in September last, Abraham Dublin, a black man; from Geo. Ward, Montg. Co, Md; living about 17 miles from Gtwn, on the road leading to Coonrod's ferry." The first known ferry operation at the location was Conrad's Ferry, pronounced contemporaneously by the locals as "Coonrod's Ferry" in 1861. After the Civil War, former Confederate officer Elijah V. White purchased it and made many improvements to the service. He named his ferry boat in honor of his former commander, General Jubal Early. The ferry boat was renamed "Historic White's Ferry" in June 2020.

Later, the ferry was managed by Malcolm Brown, whose father purchased the location in 1946 with other business partners. He eventually bought out his partners and shipped new ferries from Baltimore in 1953 and from Norfolk in 1988; both of these were named after Confederate General Jubal A. Early because of his, "rebellious, no surrender attitude".

The Confederate statue that had been moved from Rockville to White's Ferry in 2017 was moved to a private storage location by the owners on June 16, 2020, although the base of the monument remains.

Each May, White's Ferry hosts an event honoring wounded soldiers recovering at Walter Reed Army Medical Center. Escorted to the area by a large motorcycle honor guard, the soldiers enjoy a day of music, food, fishing, and rides on the ferry. The event is sponsored by the town of Poolesville, Maryland, and receives support from many groups and individuals within the community.

=== Service disruptions and current closure ===
On September 13, 2006, the United States Coast Guard ordered White's Ferry to be shut down because the operator was unlicensed. The ferry continued to operate regardless. The next day the Coast Guard allowed the ferry to resume operations after the owners assured the Coast Guard that there would be licensed individuals on the vessel. For operating without a licensed operator the ferry was fined $8,000, which it could appeal.

On December 28, 2020, the owners of White's Ferry ceased operation after a decade-long lawsuit in the Circuit Court of Loudoun County over their use of private land for a Virginia landing. The decision to cease operation of the ferry was a unilateral decision made by White's Ferry, Inc., which operates the privately-owned ferry. Judge Stephen E. Sincavage decided the case against White's Ferry on November 23, 2020, awarding Rockland Farm damages for trespass, damage to property and breach of contract. Despite the ferry's closure, no effort was made to dismantle it as it entered legal limbo. Following the case, Rockland demanded White's Ferry pay a toll of 50 cents per car to restore ferry service.

In February 2021, White's Ferry was purchased by Loudoun County businessman Chuck Kuhn with plans to revive its operation by either buying or negotiating a permanent easement on the Virginia landing site which is owned by hedge fund manager Peter Brown and his two sisters. In August 2021, Kuhn said Loudoun County may need to exercise eminent domain over the private Virginia dock site to restore service.

During an October 16, 2023, meeting of Montgomery County Council Transportation and Environment Committee, Maryland Del. David Fraser-Hidalgo called for parties to get past their issues and find a resolution. Kuhn offered to "do anything we can do to help get this ferry going," including donating the ferry and the Maryland shoreline in its entirety to Montgomery County, if Rockland agreed to donate the Virginia shoreline. Kuhn again offered in April 2024 to donate the ferry to Montgomery County, contingent on the county working with Loudoun County to get access to the Virginia side and reopen the ferry. In April 2025, Montgomery County offered a $3 million subsidy to acquire property rights and purchase equipment for the ferry. In July 2026, Montgomery County officials reached a deal with Kuhn to buy the ferry operations and the dock area on the Maryland side of the river.

== In popular culture ==
Maryland rock band Clutch has a song titled "White's Ferry", written about the sights frontman Neil Fallon saw on a drive around some country roads in Maryland and Virginia that took him over the Potomac on the ferry.
