= George W. Rust =

American politician

Member of the Virginia House of Delegates from the Page district
- In office September 7, 1863 – March 15, 1865
- Preceded by: John R. Booten
- Succeeded by: n/a

Personal details
- Born: April 7, 1815 Loudoun County, Virginia, US
- Died: May 12, 1888 (aged 73) Baltimore, Maryland, US
- Party: Conservative
- Spouse: Mary Mahala Wood
- Education: Jefferson Medical College
- Profession: medical doctor, politician

Military service
- Allegiance: Virginia; Confederate States of America

George W. Rust (April 7, 1815 – May 12, 1888) was a nineteenth-century Virginia doctor and plantation owner who during the American Civil War served in various Confederate hospitals, as well as the Virginia House of Delegates from September 7, 1863 until the war's end, and later in the Virginia Constitutional Convention of 1868.

== Early and family life ==
The son of Albert and Annie Rust, born after the War of 1812, he studied medicine in Philadelphia and received a medical degree from Jefferson Medical College in 1846. Relatives included General George Rust (d. 1853) who had represented Loudoun County in the Virginia General Assembly during this man's childhood, as well as operated several plantations and became Superintendent of the U.S. Arsenal in Harper's Ferry in the 1830s. Another relative, Albert Rust moved to Arkansas and became a Confederate General during that war.

He married Mary Mahala Wood on November 16, 1847. They had one daughter, Julia Rust Wharton (1848-1878) who died in childbirth. He married Nancy C. Jackson on December 10, 1855 in Loudoun County.

== Career ==
Dr. Rust owned a farm as well as practiced medicine in Luray, Page County, Virginia both before and after the American Civil War. In the 1850 census, although his family's entry is lost or miscategorized, his farm equipment was mentioned. The slave schedule for that census show owned a Black female slave about 14 years old. A decade later, Dr. Rust owned three slaves, a Black woman aged 25 and 14 year old mulatto boy and 12 year old mulatto girl.

In November 1861, Dr. Rust went to Mount Jackson, still in Page County, and accepted a contract to become a physician at the Confederate Military hospital. By September 1862, he received a promotion and transfer, becoming Acting Assistant Surgeon of the General Hospital at Lynchburg. Nonetheless, Page County voters elected Dr. Rust to represent them in the Virginia House of Delegates in 1863, replacing John R. Booten, and Rust served in that part-time position until the war's end. After Virginia ceded defeat to U.S. forces, J. Long represented Page County.

However, adopting a constitution forbidding slavery was a requirement for Virginia's readmission into the Union. Dr. Rust took the required loyalty oath and was elected a delegate to the Virginia Constitutional Convention of 1868, representing Page and Shenandoah Counties alongside attorney Moses Walton, a lifelong resident of the Shenandoah Valley. Both men aligned with the Conservative Party of Virginia, which sought to minimize penalties that the majority proposed to impose upon former Confederates.

== Death ==
Rust died in Luray in 1888.
