= Moses Walton (lawyer) =

American politician

Member of the Virginia House of Delegates from the Shenandoah district
- In office September 7, 1863 – March 15, 1865 Serving with Philip Pittman
- Preceded by: John Gatewood

Personal details
- Born: January 14, 1826 Shenandoah County, Virginia, US
- Died: June 15, 1883 (aged 57) Woodstock, Virginia, US
- Party: Conservative
- Spouse: Emily Marie Lauck
- Profession: lawyer, politician

Military service
- Allegiance: Virginia; Confederate States of America

Moses Walton (January 14, 1826 – June 15, 1883) was a nineteenth-century Virginia lawyer who during the American Civil War served in the Virginia House of Delegates from September 7, 1863, until the war's end, and later in the Virginia Constitutional Convention of 1868.

== Early and family life ==
The son of Reuben Moore Walton and his wife, the former Mary Ann Harrison, Moses was named for his paternal grandfather, Moses Walton, who had been sheriff of Shenandoah County, as well as serving in both houses of the Virginia General Assembly. He read law and became a lawyer, as did his younger brother David Harrison Walton.

Moses Walton married Emily Marie Lauck on February 5, 1851. Their children included Annie E. Walton Campbell (1852-1878), Morgan Lauck Walton (1854-1935), Mary O. Walton Newman (1855-1942), Emma M. Walton (1858-), Samuel Walton (1859-), Alice Heiskell Walton Haslett (1862-1950) and David Harrison Walton (1865-1927).

== Career ==
Walton practiced law in Woodstock, the Shenandoah County, Virginia, county seat both before and after the American Civil War. He owned at least one enslaved person before the war began, as had some relatives.

After Virginia seceded from the Union, his younger brother (and lawyer) David Harrison Walton organized the 33rd Virginia Infantry in which two other relatives also served and survived the war. However, Moses Walton's initial involvement was signing a "memorial" to the Confederate President and Virginia's governor on August 12, 1861, complaining about the hardship caused by excessive conscription from Shenandoah County, since 12,829 persons would be required to furnish 1269 men, and actually furnished 900 men, to the great disadvantage of their families who needed to plant the fall crop, since the county only had 443 slaves older than 12 years and 150 free negroes.

In 1863, Shenandoah County voters elected Moses Walton and Philip Pittman to represent them in the Virginia House of Delegates. After Virginia ceded defeat, Walton took the required loyalty oath and practiced law in Woodstock with his brother David Harrison Walton. Shenandoah and Page County voters elected Moses Walton and Dr. George W. Rust their delegates to the Virginia Constitutional Convention of 1868. A Conservative as was Dr. George Rust, Walton opposed various penalties that the majority proposed to impose upon former Confederates.

After the deaths of his parents and brother/law partner in the 1870s, Mose Walton moved his family to Stonewall in Shenandoah county, and before his death practiced law with his son Morgan Lauck Walton (who favored his middle name) as Walton & Walton.

== Death ==
Moses Walton died on June 15, 1883. His widow survived for nearly a quarter century and saw their son M.L. Walton elected to represent Shenandoah and Page Counties as a Democrat in the Virginia Senate in 1891.
