= William Wirt Watkins =

American politician

Delegate from Arkansas to the Provisional Congress of the Confederate States
- In office May 18, 1861 – February 17, 1862
- Preceded by: New constituency
- Succeeded by: Constituency abolished

Personal details
- Born: April 1, 1826 Jefferson County, Tennessee
- Died: January 15, 1898 (aged 71) Harrison, Arkansas
- Resting place: Carrollton Cemetery, Carrollton, Arkansas; 36°15′53.2″N 93°19′19.6″W
- Party: Democratic
- Spouse: Mary W. Crump (m. 1852–1866)

William Wirt Watkins (April 1, 1826 – January 15, 1898) was an American politician. He was born in Jefferson County, Tennessee, and later moved to Arkansas, where he served in the state senate 1856 to 1860, 1866, and 1878. He was a delegate to the Provisional Congress of the Confederate States from 1861 to 1862.

== See also ==
- List of people from Tennessee

Political offices
New constituency	Delegate from Arkansas to the Provisional Congress of the Confederate States; 1861 – 1862; With: Robert W. Johnson; Albert Rust; Hugh F. Thomason; Augustus H. Garland	Constituency abolished
