= Rockland (Leesburg, Virginia) =

Historic house in Virginia, United States

- U.S. National Register of Historic Places
- Virginia Landmarks Register
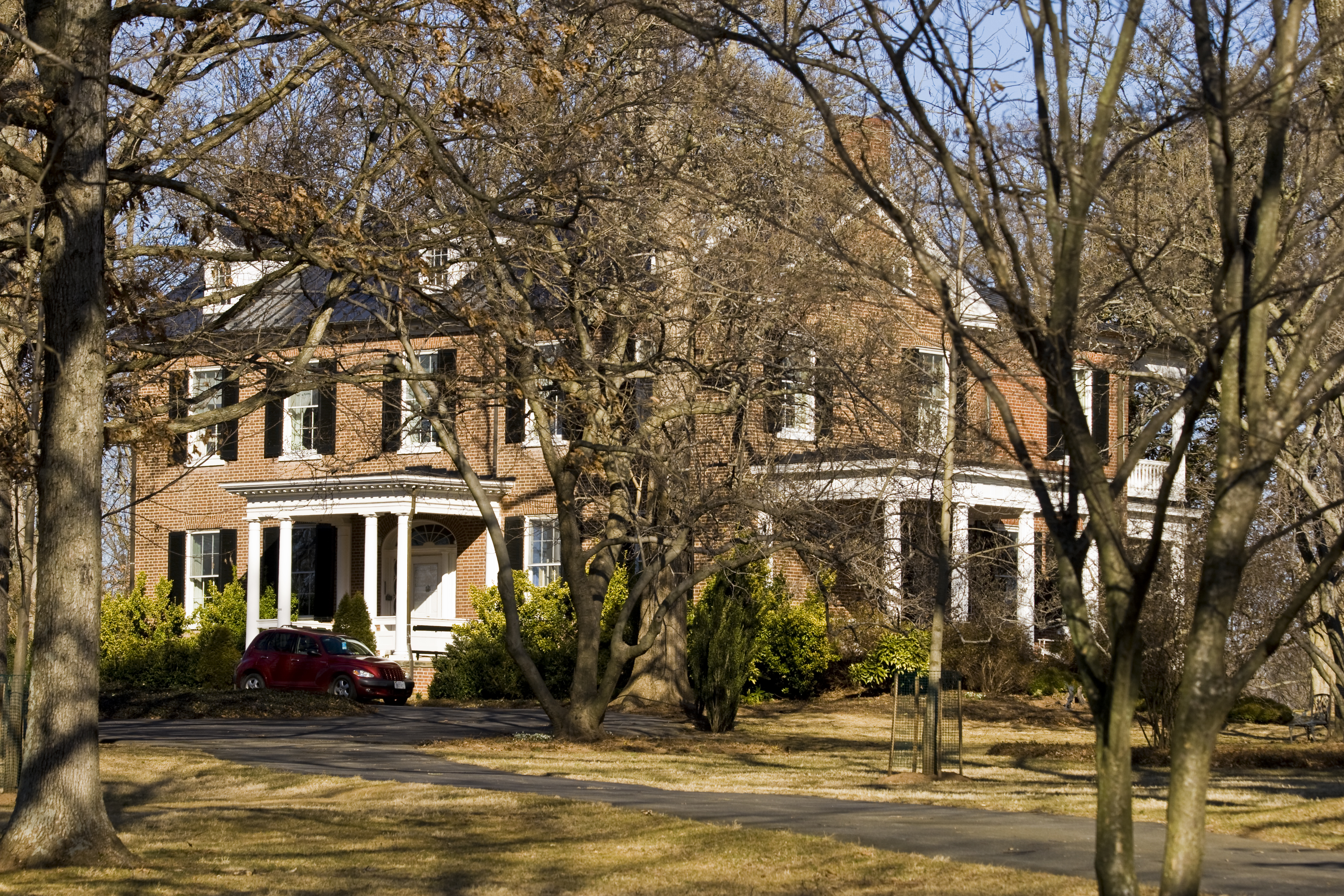

- Location within Northern Virginia Location within Virginia Location within the United States
- Location: East side of US 15, north of Leesburg, near Leesburg, Virginia
- Coordinates: 39°9′49.7″N 77°32′4.8″W
- Built: 1822
- Architectural style: Federal
- NRHP reference No.: 87000752
- VLR No.: 053-0096

Significant dates
- Added to NRHP: May 14, 1987
- Designated VLR: March 17, 1987

Rockland is the home of Virginia's Rust family, near Leesburg, Virginia. The property housed slaves to work their farm. The property was acquired by General George Rust from the heirs of Colonel Burgess Ball in 1817. General Rust built the present brick residence about 1822, incorporating an older frame house as a rear service wing.

General Rust was involved in the Baltimore area during the War of 1812 and was a member of the Virginia House of Delegates in 1818-1819 and 1820–1823. The 1850 U.S. Federal Census - Slave Schedules lists 33 slaves as being owned by George Rust of Loudon County. The Rust of Virginia genealogy is available online and lists names and transactions for some of the enslaved. On his death in 1857 the house passed to his son, Colonel Armistead Thompson Mason Rust. Born at Rockland in 1820, Colonel Rust attended West Point and served with the Confederate 19th Virginia Infantry during the American Civil War. On Colonel Rust's death in 1887, his son Henry Bedinger Rust inherited the property. Henry enlarged the house in 1908 to its present configuration. The house continues to be owned by the Brown family, descendants of the Rusts through Henry's daughter Elizabeth Fitzhugh Rust Brown.

The Federal style house has a central hall, single pile plan, extended by the 1908 additions to a double-pile plan. A one-story Roman Doric portico was added to the south elevation in 1908, while the rear (east) elevation has a Roman Doric porch across its width. The property includes a number of outbuildings, including a brick overseer's residence, brick slave quarters, a smokehouse, a small barn, a farm supervisor's house and a variety of twentieth-century buildings.

What was the Virginia landing of Whites Ferry is located at Rockland. Following a lawsuit initiated by the family owning Rockland, the ferry ceased operations.

Rockland was listed on the National Register of Historic Places in 1987.

Reference Rust, Ellsworth M. Rust of Virginia Genealogical and Biological Sketches of the Descendents of William Rust 1654–1940. Washington, 1940. http://wvancestry.com/ReferenceMaterial/Files/Rust_of_Virginia;_genealogical_and_biographical_sketches_of_the_descendants_of_William_Rust_1654-1940.pdf
