= Hugh French Thomason =

American politician

Member of the Arkansas House of Representatives from Crawford County
- In office January 10, 1887 – January 14, 1889
- Preceded by: J. H. Huckleberry
- Succeeded by: Lee Neal

Member of the Arkansas Senate from the 25th district
- In office January 10, 1881 – January 12, 1885
- Preceded by: E. P. Watson
- Succeeded by: J. M. Pettigrew

Delegate from Arkansas to the Provisional Congress of the Confederate States
- In office May 18, 1861 – February 17, 1862
- Preceded by: New constituency
- Succeeded by: Constituency abolished

Personal details
- Born: February 22, 1826 Smith County, Tennessee, U.S.
- Died: July 30, 1893 (aged 67) Van Buren, Arkansas, U.S.
- Resting place: Fairview Cemetery, Van Buren, Arkansas, U.S. 35°26′28.3″N 94°21′01.7″W
- Party: Democratic
- Profession: Lawyer

Hugh French Thomason (February 22, 1826 – July 30, 1893) was an American politician who served as Arkansas state representative from Crawford County from 1887 to 1889 and as Arkansas state senator from 1881 to 1885. He previously served in the Provisional Congress of the Confederate States representing Arkansas from 1861 to 1862.

== Early life ==
Thomason was born in Smith County, Tennessee, on February 22, 1826. His father moved to Washington County, Arkansas, when he was three years old. He was educated principally at Cane Hill, Arkansas, and studied law at Fayetteville, in the office of W. D. Reagan. He afterwards removed to Van Buren and engaged in the practice of law.

== Political career ==
Thomason first came into prominence as a politician as presidential elector when he canvassed the state against the celebrated Thomas C. Hindman. He was prosecuting attorney of the 4th Judicial Circuit from 1853 to 1854 and a member of the secession convention in 1861. In 1868, he was elected to the lower house of the legislature.

He was a candidate for congress in 1872, and was defeated by Judge W. W. Wilshire. He was one of the delegates to the congress of the Confederate States at Montgomery, Alabama, with Robert W. Johnson, Albert Rust, William W. Watkins, and Augustus H. Garland from May 18, 1861, to February 17, 1862. He represented Crawford County in the constitutional convention in 1874. he was elected State Senator in 1881, and attended two sessions of the state senate. He was returned to the lower house in 1886.

== Later life ==
Thomason was elected judge of the 15th judicial circuit in September 1890, which position he held at the time of his death. He was buried at Fairview Cemetery (Van Buren, Arkansas), on July 31, 1893, with Masonic honors.

== See also ==
- List of people from Tennessee

== Notes ==
Political offices
New constituency	Delegate from Arkansas to the Provisional Congress of the Confederate States; 1861–1862; With: Robert W. Johnson; Albert Rust; William W. Watkins; Augustus H. Garland	Constituency abolished
Arkansas Senate
Preceded by E. P. Watson	Member of the Arkansas Senate from the 25th district 1881–1885	Succeeded by J. M. Pettigrew
Arkansas House of Representatives
Preceded by J. H. Huckleberry	Member of the Arkansas House of Representatives from Crawford County; 1887–1889	Succeeded by Lee Neal
