= Fairview Cemetery (Van Buren, Arkansas) =

Historic cemetery in Arkansas, United States

- U.S. National Register of Historic Places
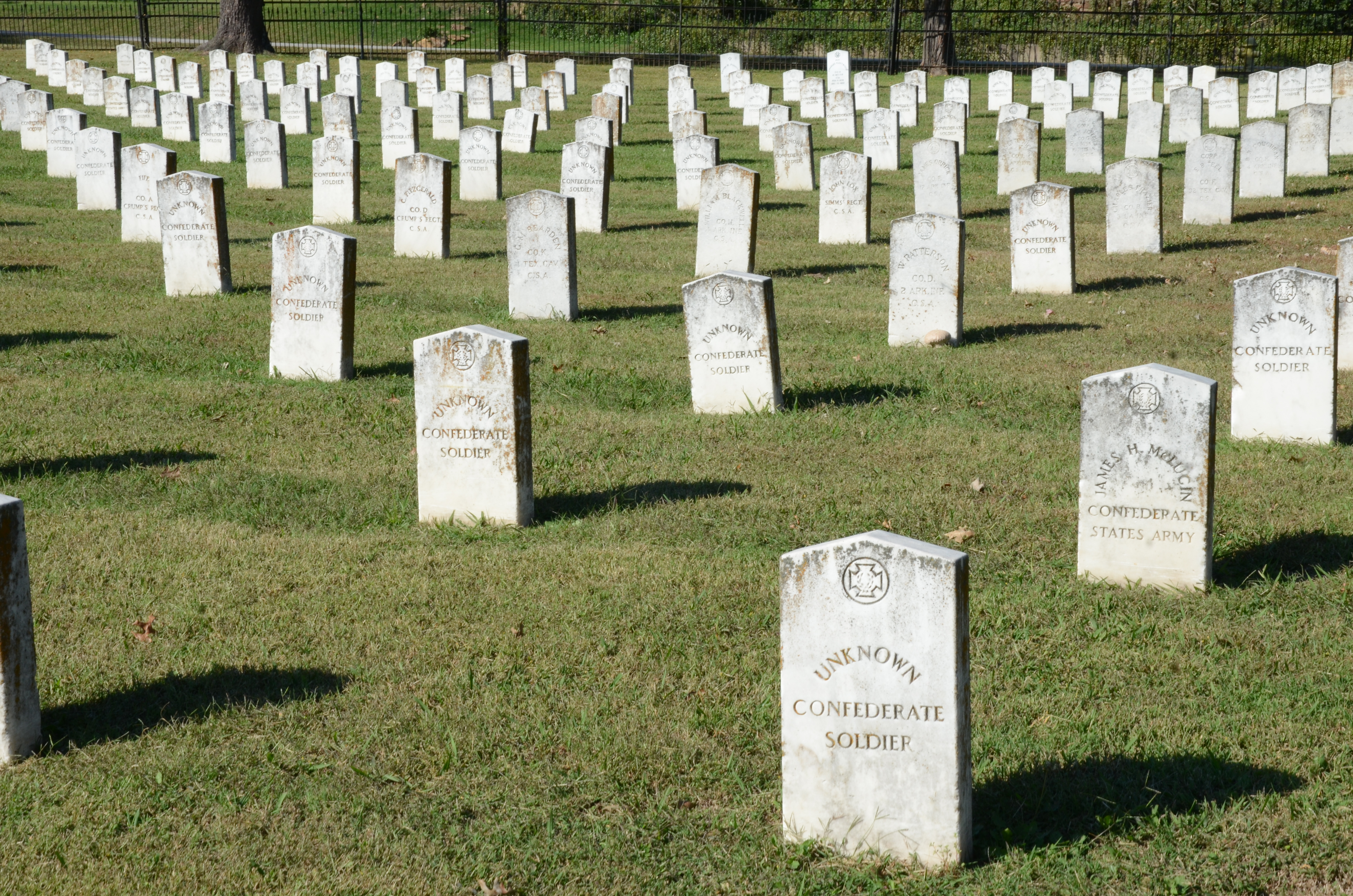
- View of Confederate graves in the cemetery

- Location within Arkansas Location within the United States
- Location: Bounded by AR 59, McKibben Ave. & Poplar St., Van Buren, Arkansas
- Coordinates: 35.4412°N 94.3508°W
- Area: 10 acres (4.0 ha)
- Built: 1816
- NRHP reference No.: 05000489
- Added to NRHP: June 1, 2005

Fairview Cemetery, also known as the Van Buren Cemetery, is a historic cemetery on the east side of Arkansas Highway 59 in Van Buren, Arkansas. The 10-acre (4.0 ha) cemetery's oldest graves date to 1816, the period of the region's settlement, and include some of Van Buren's first settlers. First established as an informal private burial ground, it was given to the city by John Drennen in 1846.

== Confederate Section ==
In 1861 a section in the eastern portion of the cemetery was set aside for burials related to the American Civil War; this section contains 442 graves of Confederate Army soldiers and eight of Union Army soldiers. Most of the Confederate graves are marked "UNKNOWN CONFEDERATE SOLDIER." Also buried is Confederate Congressman Hugh French Thomason (1826–1893).

The Confederate portion of the cemetery was listed on the National Register of Historic Places in 1996 for its association with the war and commemorative organizations, and the entire cemetery was listed in 2005 for its relevance to the history of area.

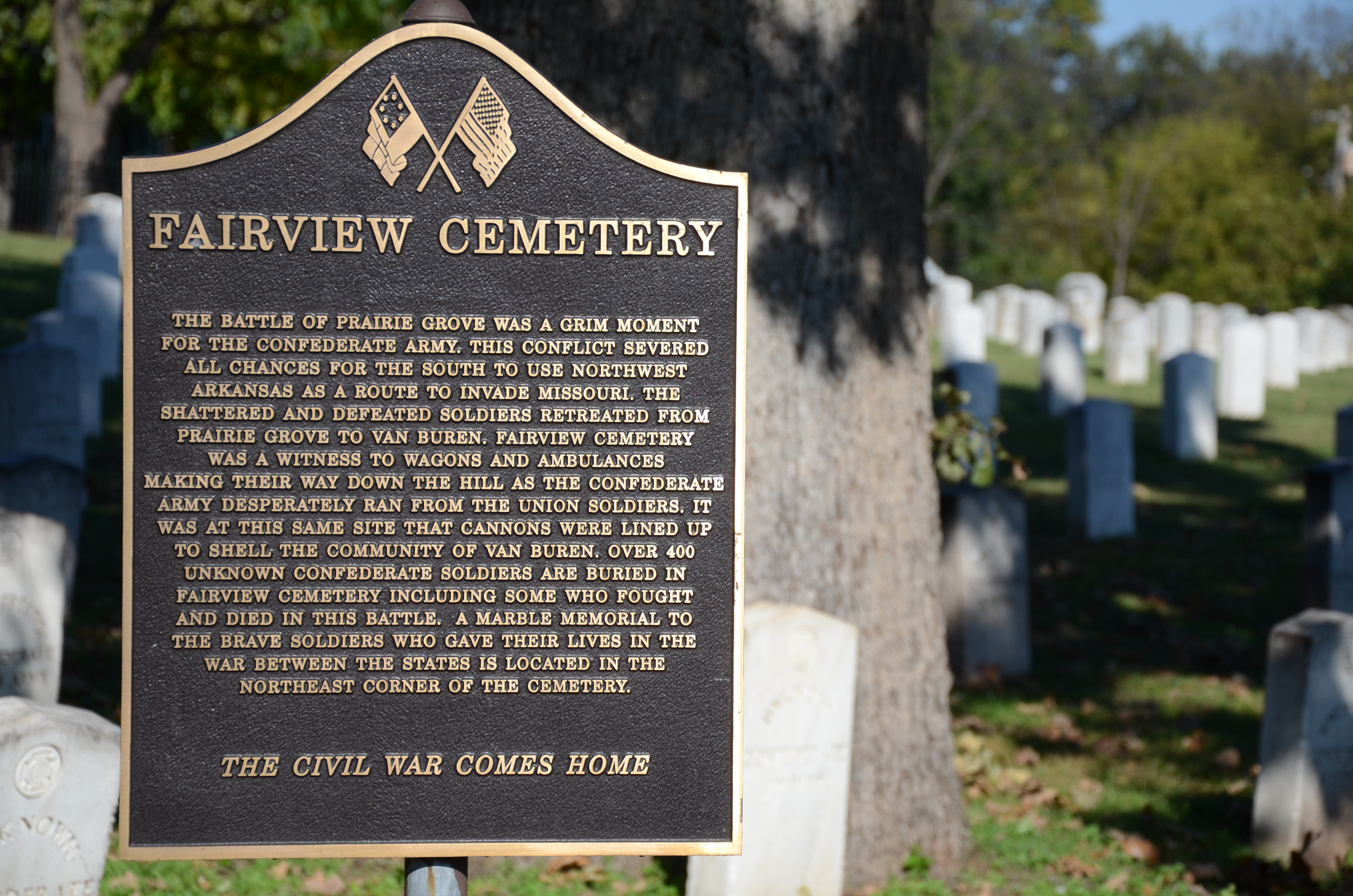
Plaque identifying Confederate Section

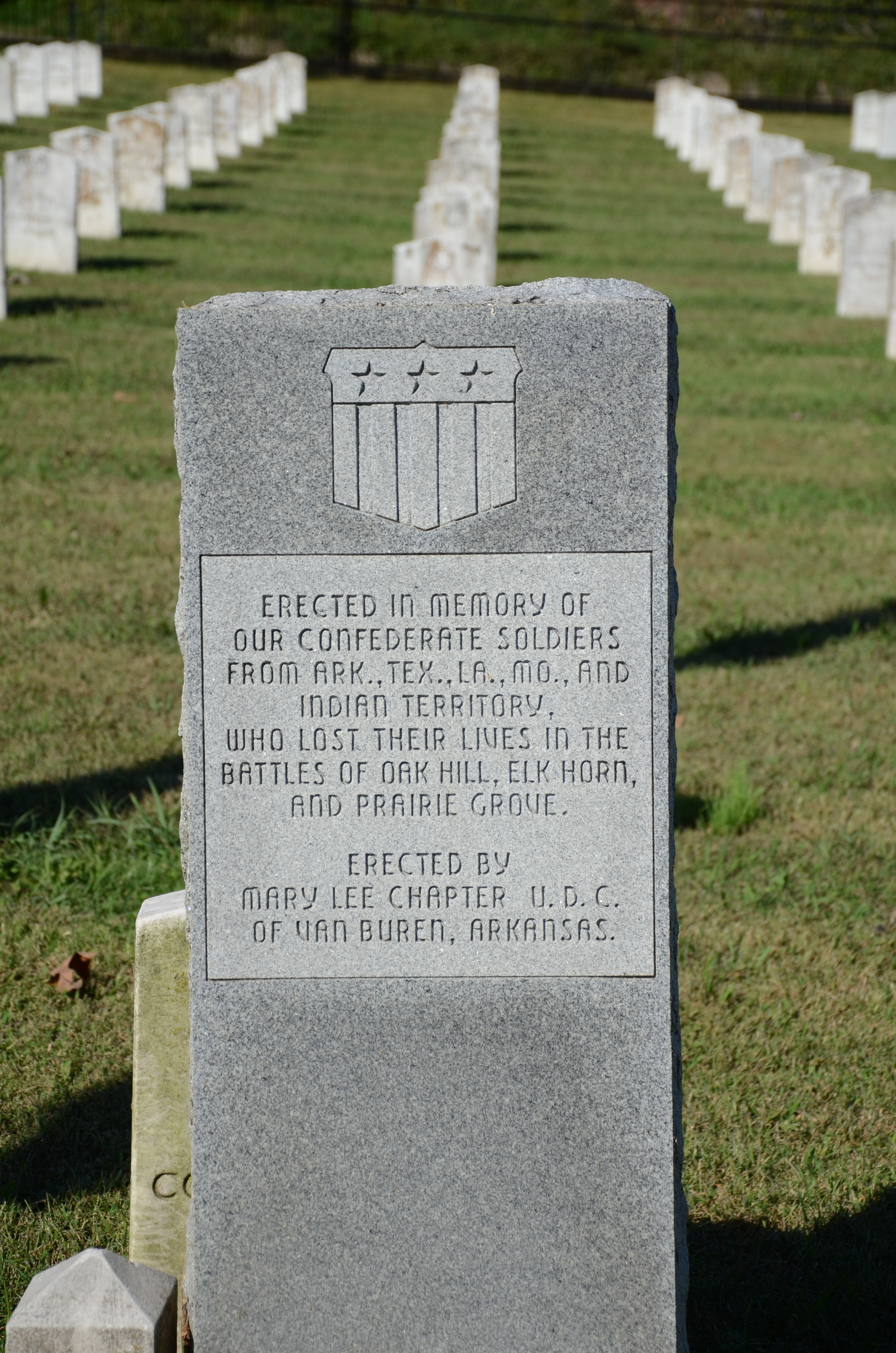
Dedication Plaque

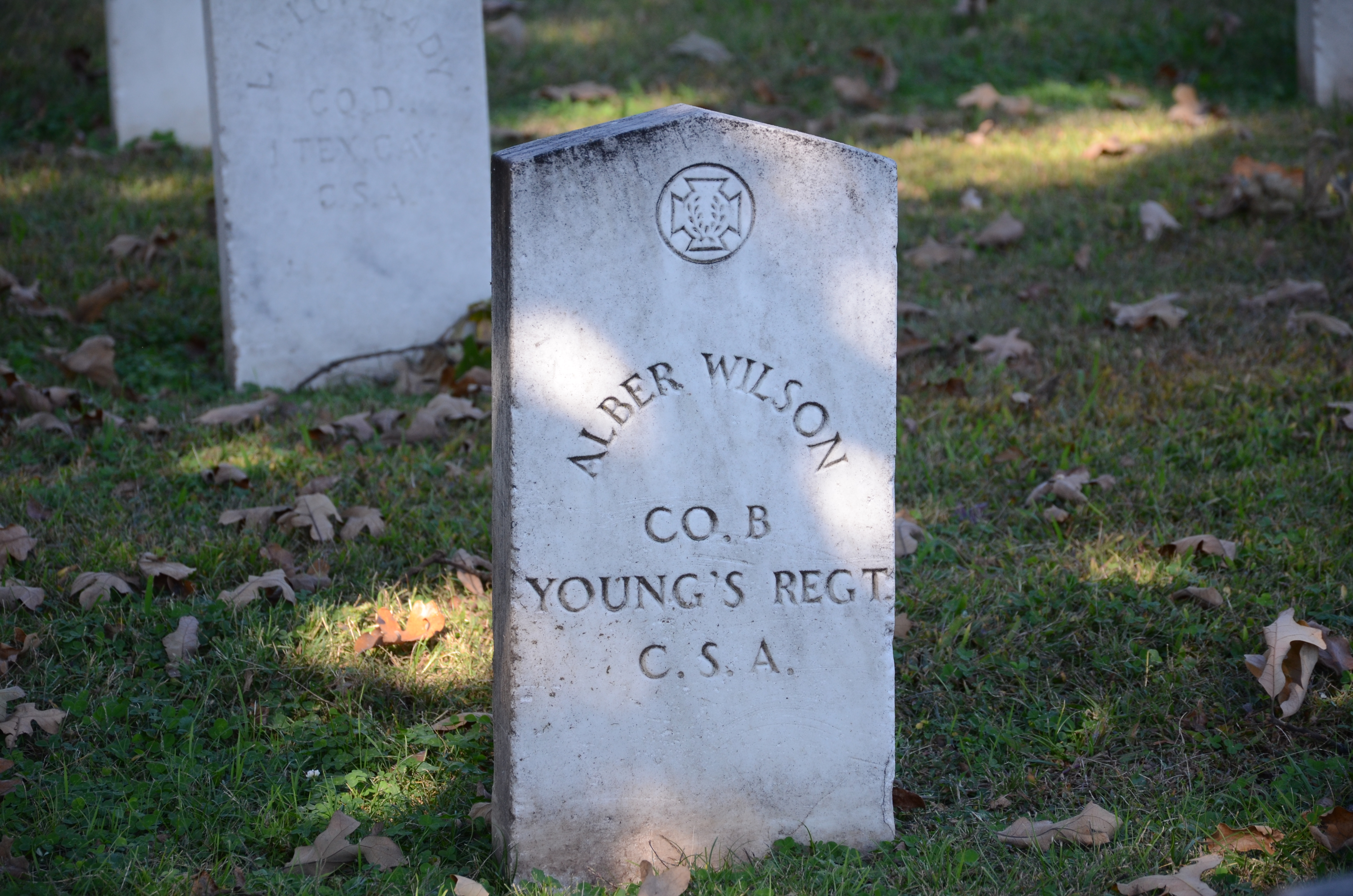
Grave Marker for Alber Wilson

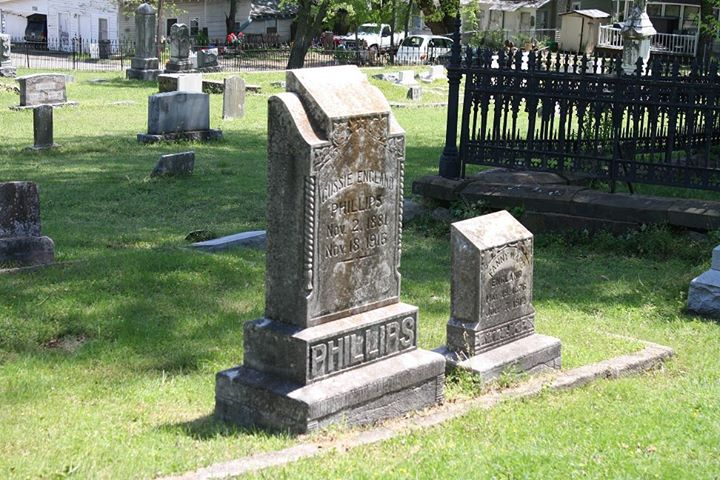
Monument for G. Phillips

Monument identifying NRHP status of Confederate Lot

== See also ==
- National Register of Historic Places listings in Crawford County, Arkansas
