= Albert Rust =

American politician

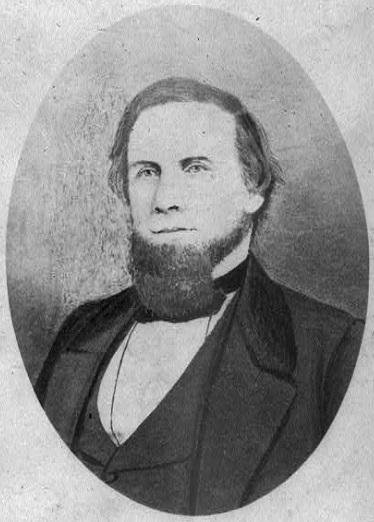

Delegate from Arkansas to the Provisional Congress of the Confederate States
- In office May 18, 1861 – February 17, 1862 Serving with: Robert W. Johnson; H. F. Thomason; W. W. Watkins; A. H. Garland
- Preceded by: New constituency
- Succeeded by: Constituency abolished

Member of the U.S. House of Representatives from Arkansas's 2nd District
- In office March 4, 1859 – March 3, 1861
- Preceded by: Edward A. Warren
- Succeeded by: None (1861–1868); James M. Hinds (Jun.–Oct. 1868)
- In office March 4, 1855 – March 3, 1857
- Preceded by: Edward A. Warren
- Succeeded by: Edward A. Warren

Member of the Arkansas House of Representatives from Union County
- In office November 1, 1852 – November 6, 1854 Serving with: T. Bustian; A. T. Raney; D. Ross
- Preceded by: L. Murph; C. L. McRae; Shelton Watson
- Succeeded by: B. R. Matthews; G. Newton; W. E. Powell; John Prince

7th Speaker of the Arkansas House of Representatives
- In office November 2, 1846 – November 4, 1848
- Governor: Thomas S. Drew
- Preceded by: John S. Roane
- Succeeded by: Edward A. Warren

Member of the Arkansas House of Representatives from Union County
- In office November 7, 1842 – November 4, 1848
- Preceded by: Hiram Smith
- Succeeded by: M. Kesse; J. Reynolds; Shelton Watson

Personal details
- Born: c. 1818 Fauquier County, Virginia, U.S.
- Died: April 4, 1870 (aged 51–52) Pulaski County, Arkansas, U.S.
- Cause of death: Brain abscess
- Party: Democratic
- Relatives: Dr. George W. Rust (brother)

Military service
- Allegiance: Confederate States
- Branch: Confederate States Army
- Years of service: 1861–1865
- Rank: Brigadier-General
- Commands: 3d Arkansas Infantry Regiment (1861–62); Rust's Brigade (1862–63)
- Battles: American Civil War; Battle of Cheat Mountain; Battle of Hancock; Action at Hill's Plantation; Battle of Corinth

Albert Rust (c. 1818 – April 4, 1870) was an American politician and slaveholder, who served as a delegate from Arkansas to the Provisional Congress of the Confederate States from 1861 to 1862. A member of the Democratic Party, he was the U.S. representative from Arkansas's 2nd congressional district (1859–1861). He also served as a senior officer of the Confederate States Army who commanded infantry in the Eastern, Western, and Trans-Mississippi theaters of the American Civil War.

== Early life and career ==
Albert Rust was born circa 1818 in Fauquier County, Virginia, to William Rust and his wife Elizabeth; his exact birth date is not known. He was admitted to the bar in 1836 and the following year moved from Virginia to Arkansas, settling in Union County, Arkansas. He bought land and a store near the river in 1837. By 1838, he held the U.S. government contract to survey land in the new state. In 1839, the county seat was moved present day Champagnolle. His storehouse there, the only suitable building, became the courthouse.

Rust then read law and was admitted to the Arkansas bar. In 1842, he won a seat in the Arkansas House of Representatives, where he was re-elected twice, and also elected 1852–1854. He ran in a special election for an open congressional seat in 1846. He won fourteen counties, yet got only third place. In 1852 he was elected Speaker Pro-Tempore of the Arkansas House of Representatives, a very powerful position. Two years later. Democrats nominated him for United States Congress. He won the general election and went to Washington, D.C.

In 1856, Rust drew public attention for his efforts to oppose Nathaniel P. Banks of Massachusetts, who appeared likely to become Speaker of the House. Banks opposed further extension of slave territory, unlike Rust and his constituents. Rust introduced a resolution inviting all current candidates for the Speakership to withdraw from the contest, which New York Tribune editor Horace Greeley attacked as a deceptive effort to force Banks out of the race. After the Tribune reached Washington, Rust accosted Greeley on the Capitol grounds, hitting him on the head, and later striking him with a heavy cane. According to longtime journalist Benjamin Perley Poore, Rust, at his arraignment in court, "appeared to glory in what he had done," after which Greeley's "more stalwart friends took care that he should not be unaccompanied by a defender when he appeared in public."

Rust showed little interest other than in military matters. He was not renominated; Edward A. Warren succeeded him. After working to regain his political reputation, Rust once again won a seat in the House of Representatives in 1858. His interest in military affairs continued in his second term. A supporter of Stephen A. Douglas in the 1860 Presidential election and strong advocate for Union, Rust shifted his position after Lincoln's call for troops. In May 1861 Arkansas seceded from the Union, and he was named a delegate to the Provisional Congress of the Confederate States.

== American Civil War ==
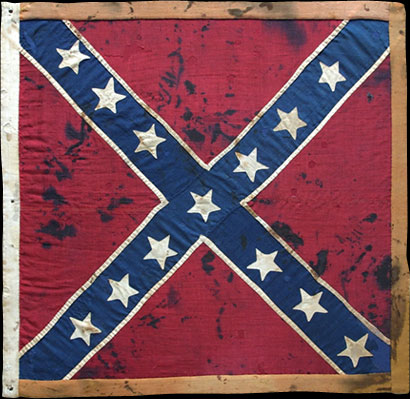
Regimental Color of the Third Arkansas (1862–1863)

Returning to Arkansas, Rust received a commission as colonel on July 5, 1861, and assisted Van H. Manning in recruiting and organizing the 3d Arkansas Infantry Regiment. The Third Arkansas would become Arkansas's most celebrated Civil War regiment and the only Arkansas regiment to be permanently assigned to General Robert E. Lee's Army of Northern Virginia. In the fall of 1861, Rust and the Third Arkansas traveled to Western Virginia and took part in the Battle of Cheat Mountain under Lee. During that winter, he and the regiment were under the command of General Stonewall Jackson. They would go on to serve in almost every major battle fought in the east, including the Battle of Gettysburg, although mostly after Rust's promotion and transfer from the regiment.

On March 4, 1862, Rust was promoted to brigadier-general and transferred back to Arkansas, where he was assigned to Lieutenant-General Earl Van Dorn's Army of the West. He led troops at the Battle of Hill's Plantation in July 1862. After the Battle of Pea Ridge, most Confederate States forces were removed from Arkansas and transferred east of the Mississippi River.

Rust fought at the Battle of Corinth, Mississippi in October. In April 1863, he was once again transferred back to Arkansas and placed under Major-General Sterling Price in the Trans-Mississippi Department. He later served under Major-Generals Thomas C. Hindman in Arkansas and John Pemberton and Richard Taylor in Louisiana. After his active military service, he moved to Austin, Texas to reunite with his family, who had abandoned their home in Arkansas during the Federal occupation and spent considerable time with his brother Dr. George W. Rust in Virginia.

== Later life and death ==
After the war Rust moved from his home in El Dorado, Arkansas, across the Arkansas River from Little Rock. He returned to Washington as a member of the U.S. House of Representatives and was even a Republican candidate for the U.S. Senate in 1869 before Congressional Reconstruction began and former Confederates were forbidden to hold elective office and he withdrew himself from candidacy. On April 3, 1870, he died in Pulaski County, Arkansas, from a brain abscess, while his wife and children were away visiting family in Virginia. His burial place is the subject of some dispute. Contemporary accounts state that he was buried at the historic Mount Holly Cemetery in Little Rock; his old Congressional biography reports his "interment in the Old Methodist Cemetery." A new Congressional Biography reports he is buried in the Oakland and Fraternal Cemetery at Little Rock.

== Personal life ==
Rust married Jane Carrington (1824-1847) of Charlotte County, Virginia, on April 17, 1844, but she soon died, and was buried in Hervey Cemetery in Hempstead County, Arkansas. He then married Anne Bouldin Cabell, and at least three of their children (raised in Virginia during the American Civil War) would survive to adulthood: Julia Rust Tutwiler (1854-1923), Breckenridge Cabell Rust (1855-1892) and author Pauline Carrington Rust Bouve (1860-1928).

== See also ==
- List of Confederate States Army generals
- List of people from Fauquier County, Virginia
- List of speakers of the Arkansas House of Representatives

Arkansas House of Representatives
Preceded by Hiram Smith	Member of the Arkansas House of Representatives from Union County; 1842–1848	Succeeded by M. Kesse; J. Reynolds; Shelton Watson
Preceded by John S. Roane	Speaker of the Arkansas House of Representatives; 1846–1848	Succeeded by Edward A. Warren
Preceded by L. Murph; C. L. McRae; Shelton Watson	Member of the Arkansas House of Representatives from Union County; 1852–1854; With: T. Bustian; A. T. Raney; D. Ross	Succeeded by B. R. Matthews; G. Newton; W. E. Powell; John Prince
U.S. House of Representatives
Preceded by Edward A. Warren	Member of the U.S. House of Representatives from Arkansas's 2nd District; 1855–1857	Succeeded by Edward A. Warren
Preceded by Edward A. Warren	Member of the U.S. House of Representatives from Arkansas's 2nd District; 1859–1861	Vacant American Civil War Title next held by James M. Hinds
Political offices
New constituency	Delegate from Arkansas to the Provisional Congress of the Confederate States; 1861–1862; With: Robert W. Johnson; H. F. Thomason; W. W. Watkins; A. H. Garland	Constituency abolished
Military offices
New regiment	Commanding officer of the 3d Arkansas Infantry Regiment; 1861–1862	Succeeded by Colonel Van H. Manning
