= Moses Walton =

American politician

Member of the Virginia Senate from the Shenandoah district
- In office December 4, 1820 – November 30, 1823 Serving with John Colville, Samuel Bare
- Preceded by: Joseph S. Spengler
- Succeeded by: Jacob Rinker Jr.

Member of the U.S. House of Representatives from 's Shenandoah and Rockingham district
- In office December 4, 1826 – December 5, 1830
- Preceded by: Robert Allen
- Succeeded by: Joel Pennybacker

Personal details
- Born: April 2, 1775 Frederick County, Virginia, US
- Died: March 13, 1847 (aged 71) Woodstock, Virginia, US
- Education: Dickinson College
- Profession: farmer, politician

Moses Walton (April 2, 1775 – March 13, 1847) was a nineteenth-century Virginia farmer who served in both houses of the Virginia General Assembly representing Shenandoah County.

== Early and family life ==
The son of Moses Walton Jr. and his wife, the former Eunice Borden Rogers, shared the name of his father and grandfather, and his grandson Moses Walton would also serve in the Virginia House of Delegates.

Moses Walton married, and his children who survived to adulthood included Reuben Moore Walton (1799-1874) and Mary Ann Walton (1807-1879).

== Career ==
Walton farmed in Shenandoah county, and also occasionally served as sheriff. He owned three enslaved person in the 182 U.S. Federal Census and four in the 1840 U.S. federal census.

Shenandoah County voters elected Moses Walton to represent them in the Virginia House of Delegates (part-time) three times for one year terms; he served first alongside John Colville and later along with Samuel Bare between 1820 and 1823. After a break, he ran and was elected to represent both Shenandoah and Rockingham County in the Virginia Senate. After the Virginia Constitutional Convention of 1829–1830, the redistricted Senate combined Shenandoah and Hary County and Joel Pennybacker won the seat.

== Death ==
Moses Walton died on March 13, 1847, and was buried at the Union Church Cemetery in Mt. Jackson in Page County, Virginia. His grandson Moses Walton would represent both Shenandoah and Page Counties in the Virginia Constitutional Convention of 1868.
