= Fairview Cemetery (Pen Argyl, Pennsylvania) =

Cemetery in Northampton County, Pennsylvania

Coordinates: 40.86°N 75.24°W

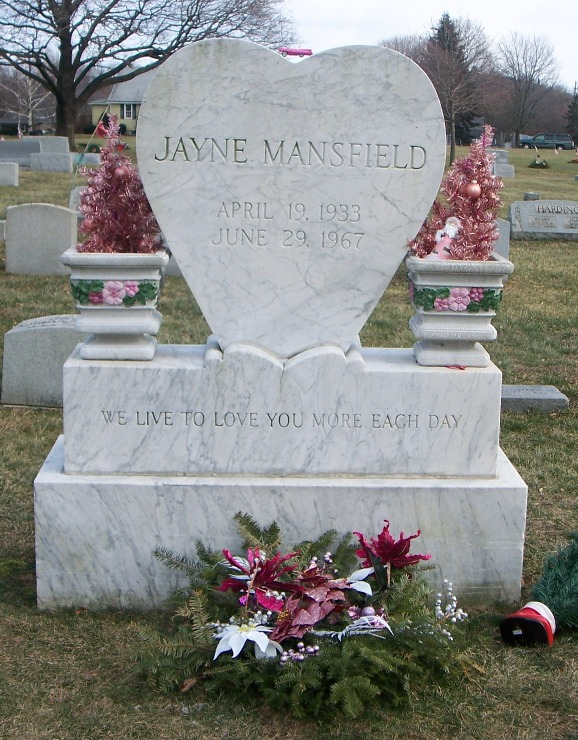
- Jayne Mansfield's tombstone in Fairview Cemetery
- Interactive map of Fairview Cemetery

Fairview Cemetery is the largest cemetery in Pen Argyl, Pennsylvania. It is a historical site and a tourist attraction because of Hollywood actress Jayne Mansfield's grave. Her heart-shaped tombstone is one of the most notable features of the cemetery. Fans of the deceased star visit the grave regularly with flowers. Farruccio and the Online Fan Club has been visiting her grave in Pen Argyl with her fans to commemorate her birth and death anniversaries since mid 1990s on her birthdays. The 75th birth anniversary of the actress drew a large gathering of fans to the cemetery in 2008.

The other major cemetery in the township is the Evergreen Cemetery. There also are St. Elizabeth Cemetery and Plainfield Union Cemetery in the township.
