= Thompson B. Flournoy =

Plantation owner and Arkansas state legislator (died 1861)

Thompson Breckenridge Flournoy (died 1861) was an American plantation owner and state legislator in Arkansas. He represented Desha County and served as Speaker of the Arkansas House of Representatives. He was a leader at the 1860 Democratic National Convention in Charleston and Baltimore.

He acquired land for a plantation in Desha County, Arkansas and moved there from Kentucky. He was one of the developers, using slave labor, of the levee system that became known as Laconia Circle Levee.

He helped block efforts to repudiate the Compromise of 1850. He supported the 1860 presidential ticket of Stephen A. Douglas and Herschel V. Johnson. He helped organize a regiment for the Confederate Army (1st Arkansas Infantry Regiment). He lived in Laconia, Arkansas.

He married twice and had children. An article on his family history was published.

In May 1861 he was authorized, along with three others, to raise a regiment and head to Lynchburg, Virginia. By January 16, 1862 he had died and was listed as having died in Louisville, Kentucky.
