= List of counties in Arkansas =

Counties of Arkansas
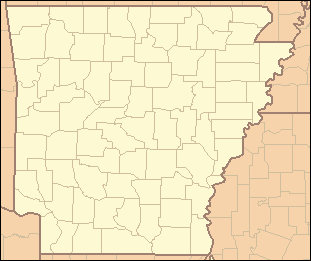
- Location: State of Arkansas
- Number: 75
- Populations: 4,632 (Calhoun) – 404,611 (Pulaski)
- Areas: 526 square miles (1,360 km^{2}) (Lafayette) – 1,039 square miles (2,690 km^{2}) (Union)
- Government: County government
- Subdivisions: Cities, towns, townships, unincorporated communities, census-designated places

Arkansas municipalities

There are 75 counties in the U.S. state of Arkansas. Arkansas is tied with Mississippi for the most counties with two county seats, at 10.

== Counties ==
County	FIPS code	County seat	Est.	Origin	Etymology	Population	Area	Map
Arkansas County	001	Stuttgart, DeWitt	Dec 13, 1813	1st County (Eastern Arkansas)	the Arkansas River	15,836	1,033.79 sq mi (2,678 km^{2})	State map highlighting Arkansas County
Ashley County	003	Hamburg	Jan 1, 1849	Chicot, Drew and Union counties	Chester Ashley (1791–1848), a U.S. Senator from Arkansas	17,831	939.08 sq mi (2,432 km^{2})	State map highlighting Ashley County
Baxter County	005	Mountain Home	Mar 24, 1873	Fulton, Izard, Marion, and Searcy counties	Elisha Baxter (1827–1899), a governor of Arkansas	42,982	586.74 sq mi (1,520 km^{2})	State map highlighting Baxter County
Benton County	007	Bentonville	Sep 30, 1836	Washington County	Thomas Hart Benton (1782–1858), a U.S. Senator from Missouri	332,554	884.86 sq mi (2,292 km^{2})	State map highlighting Benton County
Boone County	009	Harrison	Apr 9, 1869	Carroll and Marion counties	Some historians say Daniel Boone (1734–1820), the American frontiersman	38,628	601.82 sq mi (1,559 km^{2})	State map highlighting Boone County
Bradley County	011	Warren	Dec 18, 1840	Union County	Hugh Bradley, a soldier in the War of 1812 and early area settler	9,828	654.38 sq mi (1,695 km^{2})	State map highlighting Bradley County
Calhoun County	013	Hampton	Dec 6, 1850	Dallas and Ouachita counties	John C. Calhoun (1782–1850), 7th Vice President of the United States and a Senator from South Carolina	4,632	632.54 sq mi (1,638 km^{2})	State map highlighting Calhoun County
Carroll County	015	Berryville, Eureka Springs	Dec 25, 1833	Izard County and later by Madison County (1870)	Charles Carroll of Carrollton (1737–1832), a signer of the Declaration of Independence	29,263	638.81 sq mi (1,655 km^{2})	State map highlighting Carroll County
Chicot County	017	Lake Village	Oct 25, 1823	Arkansas County	Point Chicot on the Mississippi River	9,107	690.88 sq mi (1,789 km^{2})	State map highlighting Chicot County
Clark County	019	Arkadelphia	Jun 1, 1819	Arkansas (1818)	William Clark (1770–1838), explorer and Governor of the Missouri Territory	20,938	882.60 sq mi (2,286 km^{2})	State map highlighting Clark County
Clay County	021	Piggott, Corning	Mar 24, 1873	Randolph and Greene counties, and originally named Clayton before 1875	John Clayton, a state senator; later shortened to Clay to avoid misassociation with Powell Clayton	14,052	641.42 sq mi (1,661 km^{2})	State map highlighting Clay County
Cleburne County	023	Heber Springs	Feb 20, 1883	White, Van Buren, and Independence counties	Patrick Cleburne (1828–1864), a Confederate General in the Civil War	25,672	591.91 sq mi (1,533 km^{2})	State map highlighting Cleburne County
Cleveland County	025	Rison	Apr 17, 1873	Bradley, Dallas, Jefferson counties, and formerly named Dorsey County (from 1885)	Grover Cleveland (1837–1908), 22nd and 24th president of the United States (formerly Stephen Dorsey, U.S. Senator from Arkansas)	7,224	598.80 sq mi (1,551 km^{2})	State map highlighting Cleveland County
Columbia County	027	Magnolia	Dec 17, 1852	Formed from Lafayette, Hempstead, and Ouachita counties	Columbia, a female personification of the United States	21,894	766.86 sq mi (1,986 km^{2})	State map highlighting Columbia County
Conway County	029	Morrilton	Jan 1, 1826	Pulaski County	Henry Wharton Conway (1793–1827), territorial delegate to the United States House of Representatives	21,393	566.66 sq mi (1,468 km^{2})	State map highlighting Conway County
Craighead County	031	Jonesboro, Lake City	Feb 19, 1859	Mississippi, Greene, Poinsett counties	Thomas Craighead (1798–1862), a state senator who ironically opposed the creation of the county	116,957	712.98 sq mi (1,847 km^{2})	State map highlighting Craighead County
Crawford County	033	Van Buren	Jan 1, 1821	Pulaski County	William H. Crawford (1772–1834), a politician who served as Secretary of the Treasury and Secretary of War	62,657	604.20 sq mi (1,565 km^{2})	State map highlighting Crawford County
Crittenden County	035	Marion	Jan 1, 1826	Phillips County	Robert Crittenden (1797–1834), 1st Secretary of the Arkansas Territory	46,210	636.74 sq mi (1,649 km^{2})	State map highlighting Crittenden County
Cross County	037	Wynne	Nov 15, 1862	St. Francis, Poinsett, and Crittenden counties	David C. Cross, a Confederate soldier in the Civil War and local politician	16,186	622.33 sq mi (1,612 km^{2})	State map highlighting Cross County
Dallas County	039	Fordyce	Jan 1, 1845	Clark and Bradley counties	George M. Dallas (1792–1864), 11th Vice President of the United States	6,011	668.16 sq mi (1,731 km^{2})	State map highlighting Dallas County
Desha County	041	Arkansas City	Mar 4, 1839	Arkansas, Union counties, then from Chicot County (prior to 1880), and Lincoln (prior 1930)	Benjamin Desha, a soldier in the War of 1812	9,984	819.52 sq mi (2,123 km^{2})	State map highlighting Desha County
Drew County	043	Monticello	Nov 26, 1846	Bradley, Chicot, Desha, Union counties	Thomas S. Drew (1802–1879), 3rd Governor of Arkansas	17,054	835.65 sq mi (2,164 km^{2})	State map highlighting Drew County
Faulkner County	045	Conway	Apr 12, 1873	Pulaski and Conway counties	Sandford C. Faulkner (1806–1874), composer and fiddler known for the "Arkansas Traveler"	133,979	664.01 sq mi (1,720 km^{2})	State map highlighting Faulkner County
Franklin County	047	Ozark, Charleston	Feb 15, 1838	Crawford and Johnson counties	Benjamin Franklin (1706–1790), founding father of the United States	17,725	619.69 sq mi (1,605 km^{2})	State map highlighting Franklin County
Fulton County	049	Salem	Jan 1, 1843	Izard County and then later from Lawrence County (prior 1850)	William S. Fulton (1795–1844), the last Governor of the Arkansas Territory prior to statehood	12,492	620.32 sq mi (1,607 km^{2})	State map highlighting Fulton County
Garland County	051	Hot Springs	Apr 5, 1873	Montgomery, Hot Spring, and Saline counties	Augustus Hill Garland (1832–1899), U.S. Senator and 11th Governor of Arkansas	99,695	734.57 sq mi (1,903 km^{2})	State map highlighting Garland County
Grant County	053	Sheridan	Feb 4, 1869	Jefferson, Hot Spring, Saline counties	Ulysses S. Grant (1822–1885), 18th president of the United States	18,756	633.01 sq mi (1,639 km^{2})	State map highlighting Grant County
Greene County	055	Paragould	Nov 1, 1834	Lawrence County and later on by Randolph	Nathanael Greene (1742–1786), the Revolutionary War General	47,411	579.65 sq mi (1,501 km^{2})	State map highlighting Greene County
Hempstead County	057	Hope	Jun 1, 1819	Arkansas (1818)	Edward Hempstead (1780–1817), Delegate to the U.S. House of Representatives from the Missouri Territory	19,080	741.36 sq mi (1,920 km^{2})	State map highlighting Hempstead County
Hot Spring County	059	Malvern	Nov 2, 1829	Clark County and later from Montgomery County (prior 1880)	Naturally occurring hot springs within the county (Note: The namesake springs were lost to Garland County in 1873.)	33,451	622.16 sq mi (1,611 km^{2})	State map highlighting Hot Spring County
Howard County	061	Nashville	Apr 17, 1873	Pike, Hempstead, Polk, Sevier counties.	James H. Howard, a state senator	12,306	595.20 sq mi (1,542 km^{2})	State map highlighting Howard County
Independence County	063	Batesville	Oct 25, 1820	Lawrence County (1820)	The Declaration of Independence	38,785	771.57 sq mi (1,998 km^{2})	State map highlighting Independence County
Izard County	065	Melbourne	Jan 1, 1826	Independence, Crawford counties, and later from Fulton (prior 1880)	George Izard (1776–1828), Governor of the Arkansas Territory and a general during the War of 1812	14,405	584.02 sq mi (1,513 km^{2})	State map highlighting Izard County
Jackson County	067	Newport	Dec 25, 1829	Lawrence and St. Francis counties	Andrew Jackson (1767–1845), 7th president of the United States	16,741	641.45 sq mi (1,661 km^{2})	State map highlighting Jackson County
Jefferson County	069	Pine Bluff	Jan 1, 1830	Arkansas and Pulaski	Thomas Jefferson (1743–1826), 3rd president of the United States	62,987	913.70 sq mi (2,366 km^{2})	State map highlighting Jefferson County
Johnson County	071	Clarksville	Dec 25, 1833	Pope County, and a small portion from Madison County (prior 1890)	Benjamin Johnson (1784–1849), the first judge of the federal district court for Arkansas	26,225	682.74 sq mi (1,768 km^{2})	State map highlighting Johnson County
Lafayette County	073	Lewisville	Feb 1, 1828	Hempstead County and later from Columbia County (prior 1910)	Gilbert du Motier, Marquis de Lafayette (1757–1834), a Frenchman who served as a general in the Continental Army during the Revolutionary War	5,888	545.07 sq mi (1,412 km^{2})	State map highlighting Lafayette County
Lawrence County	075	Walnut Ridge	Mar 1, 1815	Arkansas and New Madrid (MO) in 1815	James Lawrence (1781–1813), an American naval officer during the War of 1812	16,273	592.34 sq mi (1,534 km^{2})	State map highlighting Lawrence County
Lee County	077	Marianna	Apr 17, 1873	Phillips, Monroe, Crittenden, and St. Francis counties.	Robert E. Lee (1807–1870), a Confederate general during the Civil War	8,029	619.47 sq mi (1,604 km^{2})	State map highlighting Lee County
Lincoln County	079	Star City	Mar 28, 1871	Arkansas, Bradley, Desha, Drew, and Jefferson counties	Abraham Lincoln (1809–1865), 16th president of the United States	12,764	572.17 sq mi (1,482 km^{2})	State map highlighting Lincoln County
Little River County	081	Ashdown	Mar 5, 1867	Sevier County	Little River, a tributary of the Red River	11,763	564.87 sq mi (1,463 km^{2})	State map highlighting Little River County
Logan County	083	Booneville, Paris	Mar 22, 1871	Franklin, Johnson, Pope, Scott, and Yell counties (Formally named Sarber County)	James Logan (1791–1859), an early settler of western Arkansas	21,633	731.50 sq mi (1,895 km^{2})	State map highlighting Logan County
Lonoke County	085	Lonoke	Apr 16, 1873	Prairie and Pulaski counties	An oak tree that stood on the site of the current county seat	76,664	802.43 sq mi (2,078 km^{2})	State map highlighting Lonoke County
Madison County	087	Huntsville	Sep 30, 1836	Washington County	Madison County, Alabama, the origin of some early settlers	18,410	837.06 sq mi (2,168 km^{2})	State map highlighting Madison County
Marion County	089	Yellville	Dec 25, 1835	Izard County	Francis Marion (1732–1795), an American general during the Revolutionary War	17,593	640.39 sq mi (1,659 km^{2})	State map highlighting Marion County
Miller County	091	Texarkana	Dec 22, 1874 (Note: A previous Miller County was created April 1, 1820, but abolished in 1838. No part of that county is in the present county.)	Lafayette County	Former Miller County, Arkansas Territory (1820-38), which was named for James Miller (1776–1851), first Governor of the Arkansas Territory	42,357	637.48 sq mi (1,651 km^{2})	State map highlighting Miller County
Mississippi County	093	Blytheville, Osceola	Jan 1, 1834	Crittenden	the Mississippi River	37,828	919.73 sq mi (2,382 km^{2})	State map highlighting Mississippi County
Monroe County	095	Clarendon	Jan 1, 1830	Phillips and Arkansas counties	James Monroe (1758–1831), 5th President of the United States	6,244	621.41 sq mi (1,609 km^{2})	State map highlighting Monroe County
Montgomery County	097	Mount Ida	Jul 1, 1843	Hot Spring	Richard Montgomery (1738–1775), an American general during the Revolutionary War	8,579	800.29 sq mi (2,073 km^{2})	State map highlighting Montgomery County
Nevada County	099	Prescott	Mar 20, 1871	Columbia, Hempstead, Ouachita counties	the state of Nevada, which has a similar outline to the county's boundaries	7,942	620.78 sq mi (1,608 km^{2})	State map highlighting Nevada County
Newton County	101	Jasper	Dec 14, 1842	Carroll	Thomas W. Newton (1804–1853), a state senator and member of the United States House of Representatives from Arkansas	7,026	823.18 sq mi (2,132 km^{2})	State map highlighting Newton County
Ouachita County	103	Camden	Nov 29, 1842	Union	the Ouachita River	21,731	739.63 sq mi (1,916 km^{2})	State map highlighting Ouachita County
Perry County	105	Perryville	Dec 18, 1840	Conway County	Oliver Hazard Perry (1785–1819), a naval officer in the War of 1812	10,309	560.47 sq mi (1,452 km^{2})	State map highlighting Perry County
Phillips County	107	Helena	Jun 1, 1820	Arkansas and Lawrence County	Sylvanus Phillips, a member of the territorial legislature	14,255	727.29 sq mi (1,884 km^{2})	State map highlighting Phillips County
Pike County	109	Murfreesboro	Dec 1, 1833	Clark and Hempstead counties	Zebulon Pike (1779–1813), the explorer and discoverer of Pikes Peak	9,964	613.88 sq mi (1,590 km^{2})	State map highlighting Pike County
Poinsett County	111	Harrisburg	Mar 1, 1838	Greene, Lawrence counties	Joel Poinsett (1779–1851), a United States Secretary of War and namesake of the poinsettia	22,483	763.39 sq mi (1,977 km^{2})	State map highlighting Poinsett County
Polk County	113	Mena	Nov 30, 1844	Sevier	James K. Polk (1795–1849), the eleventh president of the United States	19,486	862.42 sq mi (2,234 km^{2})	State map highlighting Polk County
Pope County	115	Russellville	Dec 25, 1829	Crawford County	John Pope (1770–1845), a governor of the Arkansas Territory	64,976	830.79 sq mi (2,152 km^{2})	State map highlighting Pope County
Prairie County	117	Des Arc, DeValls Bluff	Nov 25, 1846	Arkansas and Pulaski counties	Grand Prairie of eastern Arkansas	7,923	675.76 sq mi (1,750 km^{2})	State map highlighting Prairie County
Pulaski County	119	Little Rock	Jun 1, 1819	Arkansas and Lawrence counties (1818)	Casimir Pulaski (1745–1779), the Polish general in the American Revolutionary War	404,611	807.84 sq mi (2,092 km^{2})	State map highlighting Pulaski County
Randolph County	121	Pocahontas	Oct 29, 1835	Lawrence County	John Randolph of Roanoke (1773–1833), a U.S. congressman from Virginia	18,876	656.04 sq mi (1,699 km^{2})	State map highlighting Randolph County
St. Francis County	123	Forrest City	Dec 1, 1827	Formed from Phillips County	The St. Francis River, a tributary of the Mississippi River	21,800	642.40 sq mi (1,664 km^{2})	State map highlighting St. Francis County
Saline County	125	Benton	Nov 2, 1835	Independence and Pulaski	Salt reserves found within its borders	133,288	730.46 sq mi (1,892 km^{2})	State map highlighting Saline County
Scott County	127	Waldron	Dec 1, 1833	Crawford and Pope counties	Andrew Scott (1789–1841), a judge of the Arkansas Territory Supreme Court	9,965	898.09 sq mi (2,326 km^{2})	State map highlighting Scott County
Searcy County	129	Marshall	Feb 1, 1839	Marion County	Richard Searcy, a judge from Lawrence County	7,848	668.51 sq mi (1,731 km^{2})	State map highlighting Searcy County
Sebastian County	131	Fort Smith, Greenwood	Jan 6, 1851	Crawford and Scott	William K. Sebastian (1812–1865), a U.S. Senator	130,641	546.04 sq mi (1,414 km^{2})	State map highlighting Sebastian County
Sevier County	133	De Queen	Nov 1, 1828	Hempstead County	Ambrose Hundley Sevier (1801–1848), U.S. Senator	15,758	581.35 sq mi (1,506 km^{2})	State map highlighting Sevier County
Sharp County	135	Ash Flat	Jul 18, 1868	Lawrence County	Ephraim Sharp, an early settler and state legislator from the area	18,122	606.35 sq mi (1,570 km^{2})	State map highlighting Sharp County
Stone County	137	Mountain View	Apr 21, 1873	Izard, Independence, Searcy, Van Buren	Rugged, rocky area terrain	12,703	609.43 sq mi (1,578 km^{2})	State map highlighting Stone County
Union County	139	El Dorado	Nov 2, 1829	Clark and Hempstead counties	Petition of citizens in the Spirit of "Union and Unity"	36,926	1,055.27 sq mi (2,733 km^{2})	State map highlighting Union County
Van Buren County	141	Clinton	Nov 11, 1833	Conway, Izard, and Independence	Martin Van Buren (1782–1862), eighth president of the United States	16,238	724.32 sq mi (1,876 km^{2})	State map highlighting Van Buren County
Washington County	143	Fayetteville	Nov 1, 1828	Lovely County	George Washington (1732–1799), first president of the United States	271,213	951.72 sq mi (2,465 km^{2})	State map highlighting Washington County
White County	145	Searcy	Dec 1, 1835	Independence, Jackson and Pulaski counties	Hugh L. White (1773–1840), U.S. Senator from Tennessee and U.S. presidential candidate in 1836 for the Whig Party	80,085	1,042.36 sq mi (2,700 km^{2})	State map highlighting White County
Woodruff County	147	Augusta	Nov 26, 1862	Jackson and St. Francis counties	William Woodruff (1795–1885), the first newspaper publisher in Arkansas	5,710	594.05 sq mi (1,539 km^{2})	State map highlighting Woodruff County
Yell County	149	Dardanelle, Danville	Dec 5, 1840	Hot Spring, Pope, and Scott County	Archibald Yell (1797–1847), the second governor of Arkansas	19,956	948.84 sq mi (2,457 km^{2})	State map highlighting Yell County

== Racial / Ethnic Profile of counties in Arkansas (2020 Census) ==
Racial / Ethnic Profile of counties in Arkansas (2020 Census)
Following is a table of counties in Arkansas by race/ethnicity. The majority racial/ethnic group is coded per the key below.

Majority minority with no dominant group
Majority White
Majority Black
Majority Hispanic
Majority Asian
Majority Native American

Racial and ethnic composition of counties in Arkansas (2020 Census) (NH = Non-Hispanic) Note: the US Census treats Hispanic/Latino as an ethnic category. This table excludes Latinos from the racial categories and assigns them to a separate category. Hispanics/Latinos may be of any race.
County	Location of County	Total Population	White alone (NH)	%	Black or African American alone (NH)	%	Native American or Alaska Native alone (NH)	%	Asian alone (NH)	%	Pacific Islander alone (NH)	%	Other race alone (NH)	%	Mixed race or Multiracial (NH)	%	Hispanic or Latino (any race)	%
Arkansas		17,149	11,575	67.50%	4,138	24.13%	34	0.20%	94	0.55%	9	0.05%	35	0.20%	628	3.66%	636	3.71%
Ashley		19,062	12,685	66.55%	4,644	24.36%	25	0.13%	41	0.22%	6	0.03%	32	0.17%	515	2.70%	1,114	5.84%
Baxter		41,627	38,049	91.40%	88	0.21%	218	0.52%	234	0.56%	9	0.02%	94	0.23%	1,877	4.51%	1,058	2.54%
Benton		284,333	191,761	67.44%	4,523	1.59%	3,799	1.34%	13,602	4.78%	2,598	0.91%	861	0.30%	16,649	5.86%	50,540	17.77%
Boone		37,373	33,753	90.31%	96	0.26%	265	0.71%	233	0.62%	27	0.07%	82	0.22%	1,944	5.20%	973	2.60%
Bradley		10,545	5,708	54.13%	2,921	27.70%	29	0.28%	27	0.26%	0	0.00%	13	0.12%	272	2.58%	1,575	14.94%
Calhoun		4,739	3,499	73.83%	913	19.27%	3	0.06%	5	0.11%	9	0.19%	4	0.08%	179	3.78%	127	2.68%
Carroll		28,260	21,175	74.93%	88	0.31%	253	0.90%	564	2.00%	432	1.53%	94	0.33%	1,348	4.77%	4,306	15.24%
Chicot		10,208	3,887	38.08%	5,387	52.77%	26	0.25%	38	0.37%	9	0.09%	25	0.24%	255	2.50%	581	5.69%
Clark		21,446	14,093	65.71%	5,068	23.63%	76	0.35%	150	0.70%	16	0.07%	87	0.41%	864	4.03%	1,092	5.09%
Clay		14,552	13,574	93.28%	40	0.27%	44	0.30%	14	0.10%	5	0.03%	20	0.14%	528	3.63%	327	2.25%
Cleburne		24,711	22,748	92.06%	56	0.23%	112	0.45%	96	0.39%	11	0.04%	50	0.20%	1,006	4.07%	632	2.56%
Cleveland		7,550	6,429	85.15%	675	8.94%	21	0.28%	7	0.09%	1	0.01%	12	0.16%	223	2.95%	182	2.41%
Columbia		22,801	13,236	58.05%	7,834	34.36%	71	0.31%	163	0.71%	0	0.00%	71	0.31%	653	2.86%	773	3.39%
Conway		20,715	16,148	77.95%	2,190	10.57%	136	0.66%	89	0.43%	8	0.04%	22	0.11%	1,236	5.97%	886	4.28%
Craighead		111,231	79,137	71.15%	18,331	16.48%	270	0.24%	1,684	1.51%	54	0.05%	278	0.25%	4,750	4.27%	6,727	6.05%
Crawford		60,133	47,627	79.20%	857	1.43%	1,366	2.27%	939	1.56%	27	0.04%	126	0.21%	4,624	7.69%	4,567	7.59%
Crittenden		48,163	18,948	39.34%	25,804	53.58%	115	0.24%	322	0.67%	17	0.04%	89	0.18%	1,440	2.99%	1,428	2.96%
Cross		16,833	12,067	71.69%	3,651	21.69%	38	0.23%	102	0.61%	5	0.03%	43	0.26%	575	3.42%	352	2.09%
Dallas		6,482	3,425	52.84%	2,582	39.83%	14	0.22%	7	0.11%	0	0.00%	25	0.39%	228	3.52%	201	3.10%
Desha		11,395	4,732	41.53%	5,385	47.26%	36	0.32%	61	0.54%	0	0.00%	16	0.14%	392	3.44%	773	6.78%
Drew		17,350	11,148	64.25%	4,815	27.75%	68	0.39%	100	0.58%	9	0.05%	55	0.32%	499	2.88%	656	3.78%
Faulkner		123,498	92,573	74.96%	14,274	11.56%	562	0.46%	1,461	1.18%	61	0.05%	418	0.34%	7,359	5.96%	6,790	5.50%
Franklin		17,097	15,201	88.91%	78	0.46%	199	1.16%	162	0.95%	10	0.06%	30	0.18%	926	5.42%	491	2.87%
Fulton		12,075	11,201	92.76%	27	0.22%	66	0.55%	35	0.29%	0	0.00%	16	0.13%	576	4.77%	154	1.28%
Garland		100,180	77,239	77.10%	8,034	8.02%	623	0.62%	960	0.96%	71	0.07%	297	0.30%	5,909	5.90%	7,047	7.03%
Grant		17,958	16,166	90.02%	447	2.49%	70	0.39%	76	0.42%	1	0.01%	15	0.08%	743	4.14%	440	2.45%
Greene		45,736	40,509	88.57%	926	2.02%	138	0.30%	181	0.40%	287	0.63%	104	0.23%	1,995	4.36%	1,596	3.49%
Hempstead		20,065	10,558	52.62%	5,644	28.13%	81	0.40%	88	0.44%	5	0.02%	44	0.22%	692	3.45%	2,953	14.72%
Hot Spring		33,040	26,221	79.36%	3,450	10.44%	165	0.50%	114	0.35%	11	0.03%	75	0.23%	1,739	5.26%	1,265	3.83%
Howard		12,785	7,982	62.43%	2,626	20.54%	82	0.64%	62	0.48%	4	0.03%	21	0.16%	491	3.84%	1,517	11.87%
Independence		37,938	31,511	83.06%	830	2.19%	133	0.35%	340	0.90%	30	0.08%	93	0.25%	1,743	4.59%	3,258	8.59%
Izard		13,577	12,175	89.67%	256	1.89%	73	0.54%	27	0.20%	9	0.07%	33	0.24%	678	4.99%	326	2.40%
Jackson		16,755	12,754	76.12%	2,764	16.50%	43	0.26%	63	0.38%	4	0.02%	50	0.30%	616	3.68%	461	2.75%
Jefferson		67,260	25,230	37.51%	37,712	56.07%	212	0.32%	664	0.99%	93	0.14%	164	0.24%	1,697	2.52%	1,488	2.21%
Johnson		25,749	19,400	75.34%	454	1.76%	202	0.78%	918	3.57%	27	0.10%	56	0.22%	1,253	4.87%	3,439	13.36%
Lafayette		6,308	3,870	61.35%	2,043	32.39%	29	0.46%	32	0.51%	5	0.08%	6	0.10%	178	2.82%	145	2.30%
Lawrence		16,216	14,925	92.04%	138	0.85%	41	0.25%	38	0.23%	10	0.06%	33	0.20%	674	4.16%	357	2.20%
Lee		8,600	3,424	39.81%	4,657	54.15%	18	0.21%	13	0.15%	1	0.01%	15	0.17%	256	2.98%	216	2.51%
Lincoln		12,941	8,188	63.27%	3,650	28.20%	27	0.21%	23	0.18%	9	0.07%	17	0.13%	408	3.15%	619	4.78%
Little River		12,026	8,593	71.45%	2,164	17.99%	161	1.34%	19	0.16%	9	0.07%	20	0.17%	651	5.41%	409	3.40%
Logan		21,131	18,586	87.96%	225	1.06%	228	1.08%	328	1.55%	8	0.04%	35	0.17%	1,081	5.12%	640	3.03%
Lonoke		74,015	60,596	81.87%	4,349	5.88%	314	0.42%	716	0.97%	49	0.07%	173	0.23%	4,208	5.69%	3,610	4.88%
Madison		16,521	14,075	85.19%	36	0.22%	205	1.24%	102	0.62%	238	1.44%	59	0.36%	916	5.54%	890	5.39%
Marion		16,826	15,414	91.61%	20	0.12%	127	0.75%	56	0.33%	0	0.00%	14	0.08%	816	4.85%	379	2.25%
Miller		42,600	27,593	64.77%	10,922	25.64%	246	0.58%	205	0.48%	4	0.01%	139	0.33%	1,908	4.48%	1,583	3.72%
Mississippi		40,685	22,861	56.19%	14,251	35.03%	67	0.16%	242	0.59%	3	0.01%	98	0.24%	1,392	3.42%	1,771	4.35%
Monroe		6,799	3,538	52.04%	2,751	40.46%	30	0.44%	28	0.41%	7	0.10%	32	0.47%	227	3.34%	186	2.74%
Montgomery		8,484	7,499	88.39%	13	0.15%	92	1.08%	47	0.55%	5	0.06%	14	0.17%	399	4.70%	415	4.89%
Nevada		8,310	5,145	61.91%	2,433	29.28%	37	0.45%	41	0.49%	0	0.00%	16	0.19%	284	3.42%	354	4.26%
Newton		7,225	6,658	92.15%	6	0.08%	66	0.91%	24	0.33%	1	0.01%	19	0.26%	369	5.11%	82	1.13%
Ouachita		22,650	12,092	53.39%	8,856	39.10%	49	0.22%	123	0.54%	3	0.01%	47	0.21%	964	4.26%	516	2.28%
Perry		10,019	9,069	90.52%	107	1.07%	43	0.43%	12	0.12%	0	0.00%	25	0.25%	477	4.76%	286	2.85%
Phillips		16,568	5,541	33.44%	10,305	62.20%	38	0.23%	64	0.39%	4	0.02%	19	0.11%	333	2.01%	264	1.59%
Pike		10,171	8,525	83.82%	238	2.34%	83	0.82%	16	0.16%	0	0.00%	26	0.26%	452	4.44%	831	8.17%
Poinsett		22,965	19,163	83.44%	1,773	7.72%	91	0.40%	56	0.24%	1	0.00%	50	0.22%	1,002	4.36%	829	3.61%
Polk		19,221	16,092	83.72%	39	0.20%	335	1.74%	100	0.52%	9	0.05%	54	0.28%	1,314	6.84%	1,278	6.65%
Pope		63,381	50,037	78.95%	2,060	3.25%	456	0.72%	664	1.05%	23	0.04%	177	0.28%	3,549	5.60%	6,415	10.12%
Prairie		8,282	6,924	83.60%	922	11.13%	19	0.23%	20	0.24%	3	0.04%	11	0.13%	238	2.87%	145	1.75%
Pulaski		399,125	193,993	48.60%	142,139	35.61%	1,169	0.29%	9,933	2.49%	208	0.05%	1,458	0.37%	17,072	4.28%	33,153	8.31%
Randolph		18,571	16,553	89.13%	140	0.75%	84	0.45%	73	0.39%	595	3.20%	26	0.14%	716	3.86%	384	2.07%
St. Francis		23,090	9,206	39.87%	12,501	54.14%	65	0.28%	122	0.53%	0	0.00%	35	0.15%	475	2.06%	686	2.97%
Saline		123,416	96,745	78.39%	10,351	8.39%	522	0.42%	1,453	1.18%	70	0.06%	331	0.27%	5,437	4.41%	8,507	6.89%
Scott		9,836	8,031	81.65%	31	0.32%	183	1.86%	275	2.80%	5	0.05%	31	0.32%	532	5.41%	748	7.60%
Searcy		7,828	7,092	90.60%	5	0.06%	65	0.83%	20	0.26%	5	0.06%	15	0.19%	486	6.21%	140	1.79%
Sebastian		127,799	82,785	64.78%	7,891	6.17%	2,379	1.86%	5,700	4.46%	91	0.07%	299	0.23%	9,326	7.30%	19,328	15.12%
Sevier		15,839	8,400	53.03%	550	3.47%	305	1.93%	60	0.38%	241	1.52%	21	0.13%	754	4.76%	5,508	34.77%
Sharp		17,271	15,729	91.07%	114	0.66%	121	0.70%	57	0.33%	20	0.12%	24	0.14%	844	4.89%	362	2.10%
Stone		12,359	11,387	92.14%	21	0.17%	87	0.70%	25	0.20%	2	0.02%	30	0.24%	536	4.34%	271	2.19%
Union		39,054	22,904	58.65%	12,670	32.44%	108	0.28%	273	0.70%	16	0.04%	116	0.30%	1,213	3.11%	1,754	4.49%
Van Buren		15,796	14,319	90.65%	71	0.45%	110	0.70%	56	0.35%	0	0.00%	15	0.09%	724	4.58%	501	3.17%
Washington		245,871	160,566	65.30%	8,330	3.39%	2,443	0.99%	5,631	2.29%	8,734	3.55%	729	0.30%	14,683	5.97%	44,755	18.20%
White		76,822	64,363	83.78%	3,677	4.79%	319	0.42%	616	0.80%	25	0.03%	214	0.28%	4,109	5.35%	3,499	4.55%
Woodruff		6,269	4,235	67.55%	1,601	25.54%	8	0.13%	22	0.35%	0	0.00%	25	0.40%	282	4.50%	96	1.53%
Yell		20,263	14,710	72.60%	226	1.12%	111	0.55%	202	1.00%	11	0.05%	29	0.14%	770	3.80%	4,204	20.75%

== Former counties in Arkansas ==
=== Lovely County ===
Created on October 13, 1827, partitioned from Crawford County. The Treaty of Washington, 1828 ceded most of its territory to Indian Territory. Abolished October 17, 1828 with the remaining portion becoming Washington County.

=== Miller County ===
Created from Hempstead County. Most of its northern portion was in Choctaw Nation (now part of Oklahoma); rest of northern portion was dissolved into Sevier County in 1828. All of its southern portion was in Texas, and was nominally dissolved into Lafayette County in 1838. The present Miller County was created in 1874 from an area that was part of Lafayette County before the former Miller County was dissolved.
