= Conway-Johnson family =

American political family

Conway-Johnson
- American political family from Arkansas
- Founded: 1820s
- Founder: Henry Wharton Conway (1796–1855)

Conway-Johnson family (also called “The Family” or “The Dynasty”) was a prominent American political family from Arkansas of British origin. It was founded by Henry Wharton Conway of Greene County, Tennessee, who had come to the state of Arkansas in 1820 with his younger brother James and his cousins Elias and Wharton Rector, all of whom were deputy-surveyors under the patronage of their uncle, William Rector, Surveyor General of Missouri, Illinois, and Arkansas.

== History ==
The Conway-Johnson family developed following a fatal duel between former friends Robert Crittenden and Henry Wharton Conway on October 27, 1827, near Napoleon, Arkansas. Conway had served as territorial delegate for Arkansas, with Crittenden acting behind the scenes on his behalf. After the resignation of Territorial Governor Miller in 1824, Conway nominated Crittenden to fill the position. President James Monroe appointed George Izard instead. Crittenden continued as secretary of state. He and Conway disagreed over the latter's decision not to seek re-election in 1825.

Conway defeated Robert Oden, who was backed by Crittenden. After a period of public conflict through the newspapers, Crittenden challenged Conway to a duel. Conway fired first and hit a button on Crittenden's coat; Crittenden shot and hit Conway, who died of his wounds weeks later. By firing at Conway after having been hit, Crittenden broke the dueling etiquette. His political career suffered. Conway's brother James formed a political alliance with Ambrose H. Sevier and supported his appointment to fill the deceased Conway's territorial seat. The duel caused realignments and a split in Arkansas politics. Crittenden supporters later became the Whig Party. The Conways and Seviers led the Democrats in opposition to Crittenden.

== Member families ==
The alliance between the immediate Conway and Sevier families later broadened to include Conway's cousins Elias and Wharton Rector. Additional political families were linked by marriage. Henry Conway had married the daughter of Benjamin Johnson, a superior court judge in Arkansas Territory. Sevier had married a sister of Robert Ward Johnson, a member of a powerful Kentucky political family. Johnson served as a Congressman and US Senator from Arkansas in the antebellum years and was part of The Family. The group was a staunch supporter of Andrew Jackson and Jacksonian policies.

== Members ==
Sevier and Conway came from prominent political families. This list shows the first generation of politicians - of their father's generation, followed by their own generation, and then their descendants:

- John Sevier (1745–1815), Governor of the State of Franklin 1785–1789, U.S. Representative from North Carolina 1790–1791, Governor of Tennessee 1796-1801 1803-1809, U.S. Representative from Tennessee 1811–1815. Granduncle of Ambrose Hundley Sevier.
- Henry Conway (1749–1812), Treasurer of the State of Franklin (1787) and close friend of John Sevier; grandfather of James S. Conway, Henry Wharton Conway, Ambrose Hundley Sevier, and Elias Nelson Conway; Conway's daughters, Nancy and Elizabeth, married Sevier's sons, James and John, Jr., respectively.
- Richard Mentor Johnson (1780–1850), Kentucky State Representative, U.S. Representative from Kentucky 1807-1819 1829-1837, U.S. Senator from Kentucky 1819–1829, Vice President of the United States 1837–1841. Brother of James Johnson and John Telemachus Johnson.
- John Telemachus Johnson (1788–1856), Kentucky State Representative, U.S. Representative from Kentucky 1821–1825, Judge of Kentucky Court of Appeals 1826. Brother of Richard Mentor Johnson and James Johnson.
- James Johnson (1774–1826), U.S. Representative from Kentucky 1825–1826. Brother of Richard Mentor Johnson and John Telemachus Johnson.
  - Henry Wharton Conway (1793–1827), Arkansas Territory Receiver of Public Moneys 1820–1821, U.S. Congressional Delegate from Arkansas Territory 1823–1827. First cousin of Ambrose Hundley Sevier.
  - James Sevier Conway (1798–1855), Surveyor-General of Arkansas Territory 1832–1836, Governor of Arkansas 1836–1840. First cousin of Ambrose Hundley Sevier.
  - Ambrose Hundley Sevier (1810–1848), Arkansas Territory Representative 1823–1827, U.S. Congressional Delegate from the Arkansas Territory 1828–1836, U.S. Senator from Arkansas 1836–1848. Grandnephew of John Sevier.
  - Elias Nelson Conway (1812–1892), Arkansas Auditor 1835–1849, Governor of Arkansas 1852–1860. First cousin of Ambrose Hundley Sevier.
  - Robert Ward Johnson (1814–1879), Prosecuting Attorney of Little Rock, Arkansas 1840–1842; U.S. Representative from Arkansas 1847–1853; U.S. Senator from Arkansas 1853–1861; Confederate States Representative from Arkansas 1861; Confederate States Senator from Arkansas 1862–1865; candidate for U.S. Senate from Arkansas 1878. Brother-in-law of Ambrose Hundley Sevier.
  - Henry Massey Rector (1816–1899), Arkansas State Senator 1848–1850, Arkansas State Representative 1855–1859, Justice of the Arkansas Supreme Court, Governor of Arkansas 1860–1862, delegate to the Arkansas Constitutional Convention 1874. First cousin of Henry Wharton Conway, John Sevier Conway, and Elias Nelson Conway.
  - James L. Alcorn (1816–1894), Kentucky State Representative 1843, Mississippi State Representative 1846 1856-1857, Mississippi State Senator 1848–1854, candidate for U.S. Representative from Mississippi 1856, Governor of Mississippi 1870–1871, U.S. Senator from Mississippi 1871–1877, candidate for Governor of Mississippi 1873. Father-in-law of Elias W. Rector.
    - Thomas James Churchill (1824–1905), Treasurer of Arkansas 1874–1880, Governor of Arkansas 1881–1883. Son-in-law of Ambrose Hundley Sevier.
    - Elias W. Rector, candidate for Governor of Arkansas, Arkansas State Representative. Son of Henry Massey Rector.

== See also ==
- Conway Cemetery State Park
- List of United States political families
