= Chester Ashley =

American politician (1790–1848)

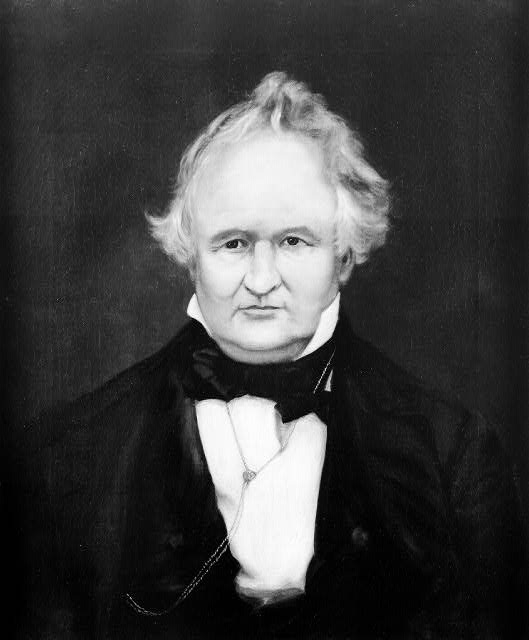

United States Senator from Arkansas
- In office November 8, 1844 – April 29, 1848
- Preceded by: William S. Fulton
- Succeeded by: William K. Sebastian

Personal details
- Born: June 1, 1790 Amherst, Massachusetts, U.S.
- Died: April 29, 1848 (aged 57) Washington, D.C., U.S.
- Resting place: Mount Holly Cemetery, Little Rock, Arkansas, U.S. 34°44′15.3″N 92°16′42.5″W
- Party: Democratic

Chester Ashley (June 1, 1790 – April 29, 1848) was an American politician who represented Arkansas in the United States Senate from 1844 until his sudden death in 1848.

== Early life ==
Ashley was born in Amherst, Massachusetts in 1790; while a child he moved with his parents to Hudson, New York. He graduated from Williams College. Following this, he attended the Litchfield Law School. Ashley moved west upon completion of his education, going first to Illinois, and thence to Missouri. In 1820 he arrived in Little Rock, Arkansas, soon becoming one of the best and most prominent lawyers in the Arkansas Territory; for a time, his partner in practice was Robert Crittenden. Together, Ashley and Crittenden founded Rose Law Firm.

== Legal and political career ==
For some twenty years Ashley's practice was the largest in the state, and he became a wealthy man. He also owned slaves (including the father of Little Rock teacher Charlotte Andrews Stephens), speculated in land, and was the owner and operator of plantations in the southeastern portion of the state. His wealth led him to try his hand at politics; in 1844 he canvassed the state campaigning for James K. Polk for president; the Democrats were victorious, and Ashley was elected by the state legislature to fill a vacancy in the Senate. Soon after entering, he was made the Chairman of the Senate Judiciary Committee; in 1846, he was reelected to the Senate. Two years later, he became suddenly ill in the Senate Chamber and died not long after.

== Personal life ==
Ashley was the father of Delos Rodeyn Ashley, who went on to serve as the State Treasurer of California and as a U.S. representative from Nevada.

One of Ashley's descendants is Sterling R. Cockrill, the Democratic Speaker of the Arkansas House of Representatives from 1968 to 1969 and the unsuccessful Republican nominee for lieutenant governor in 1970.

== Legacy ==
Chester Ashley is the namesake of Ashley County, Arkansas.

== See also ==
- List of United States senators from Arkansas
- List of members of the United States Congress who died in office (1790–1899)

U.S. Senate
Preceded by William Savin Fulton	U.S. senator (Class 2) from Arkansas; 1844–1848; Served alongside: Ambrose Hundley Sevier and Solon Borland	Succeeded by William K. Sebastian
