= James Woodson Bates =

American judge (1788–1846)

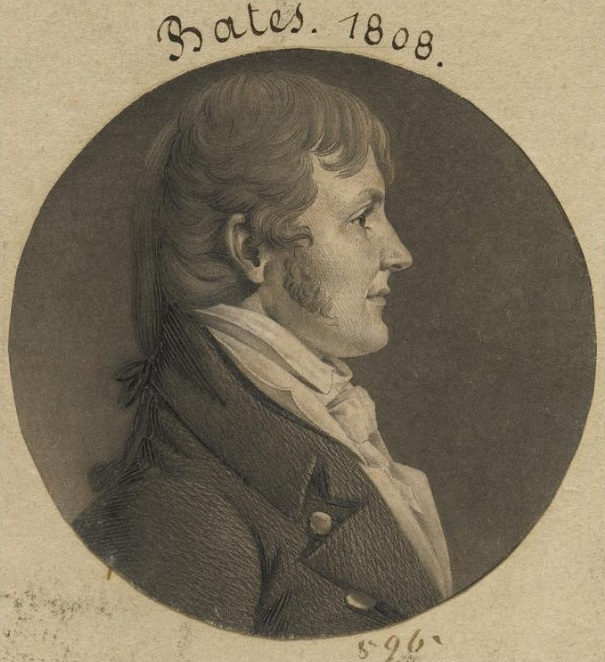

Delegate to the U.S. House of Representatives from Arkansas Territory
- In office December 21, 1819 – March 3, 1823
- Preceded by: Office created
- Succeeded by: Henry W. Conway

Delegate to 1836 Arkansas Constitutional Convention
- In office January 4, 1836 – January 30, 1836 Serving with Richard C.S. Brown and John Drennen
- Constituency: Crawford County

Personal details
- Born: August 25, 1788 Goochland County, Virginia, U.S.
- Died: December 26, 1846 (aged 58) Van Buren, Arkansas, U.S.
- Spouse: Elizabeth Moore Bates
- Relations: Frederick, Edward; see Bates extended family
- Education: Princeton University
- Profession: Attorney

James Woodson Bates (August 25, 1788 – December 26, 1846) was an American lawyer and statesman from Sebastian County, Arkansas. He represented the Arkansas Territory as a delegate to the United States House of Representatives.

== Early life and education ==
James was born in Goochland County, Virginia at his parents' plantation known as Belmont. Part of a political family, Bates was the younger brother of Frederick Bates, second governor of Missouri; and older brother of Edward Bates, who served as U.S. Attorney General to President Abraham Lincoln. He was the ninth child of Thomas and Caroline (Woodson) Bates. He started his advanced education at Yale University but soon transferred to Princeton University, where he graduated in 1807. He read law and then went West.

== Career ==
In 1807, Bates' older brother Frederick was Secretary of the Missouri Territory, based in St. Louis. James and his younger brother Edward joined Frederick in St. Louis, where James began the practice of law (Edward would follow him in this profession).

When the Arkansas Territory was created in 1819, Bates moved to its capital, Arkansas Post, to become one of the first lawyers in the new territory. That fall he was elected to be the non-voting delegate for the territory in the United States House of Representatives. He served two terms, from December 21, 1819, until March 3, 1823, and chose not to stand for re-election in 1822.

While serving in Congress, he had moved to the small settlement called Poke Bayou. When the town plat was laid out in 1821, it was renamed Batesville in his honor. When his congressional term ended, he returned to Batesville and resumed practicing law. He became a local judge in 1824, riding the fourth circuit through the western part of the territory.

In 1828 President John Quincy Adams appointed him to the superior court of the territory. Bates served until President Jackson named judge Charles S. Bibb to the post. In 1835 he was a delegate to the constitutional convention for the new state of Arkansas.

While serving as a circuit judge, Bates met a wealthy widow, Elizabeth Moore. After they married, he moved to her Moore Farm near Van Buren in Crawford County. He later served as a probate court judge and a registrar in the land office. He owned slaves.

== Death ==
Bates died in Van Buren, Arkansas, on December 26, 1846. He is interred at a private family graveyard on the Moore farm near Van Buren.

U.S. House of Representatives
Preceded by office created	Delegate to the U.S. House of Representatives from Arkansas Territory; December 21, 1819 – March 3, 1823	Succeeded by Henry W. Conway
