= Arkansas Territory's at-large congressional district =

Former congressional district

- Obsolete district
- Created: 1819, as a non-voting delegate was granted by Congress
- Eliminated: 1836, as a result of statehood
- Years active: 1819–1836

Arkansas Territory's at-large congressional district was the congressional district for the Arkansas Territory. The Arkansas Territory was created on July 4, 1819, from a portion of the Missouri Territory. It existed until Arkansas was admitted to the Union on June 15, 1836.

== List of delegates representing the district ==
Delegate	Party	Years	Cong ress	Note
District created July 4, 1819
Vacant		July 4, 1819 – December 21, 1819	16th	
James W. Bates (Poke Bayou)	none	December 21, 1819 – March 3, 1823	16th 17th	Elected in 1819. Re-elected in 1821. Lost re-election.
Henry W. Conway (Little Rock)	none	March 4, 1823 – November 9, 1827	18th 19th 20th	Elected in 1823. Re-elected in 1825. Died.
Vacant		November 9, 1827 – February 13, 1828	20th	
Ambrose H. Sevier (Little Rock)	Jacksonian	February 13, 1828 – June 15, 1836	20th 21st 22nd 23rd 24th	Elected to finish Conway's term and seated February 13, 1828. Re-elected in 1829. Re-elected in 1831. Re-elected in 1833. Re-elected in 1835. Seat eliminated after Arkansas achieved statehood.
District eliminated June 15, 1836
