= Governor Crittenden =

Governor Crittenden may refer to:

- John J. Crittenden (1787–1863), 17th Governor of Kentucky
- Robert Crittenden (1797–1834), Acting Governor of Arkansas Territory, brother of John J. Crittenden
- Thomas Theodore Crittenden (1832–1909), 24th Governor of Missouri, nephew of John J. Crittenden and Robert Crittenden.
