= Henry W. Conway =

American politician (1793–1827)

Henry Conway
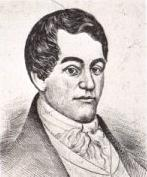

Delegate to the U.S. House of Representatives from the Arkansas Territory's at-large district
- In office March 4, 1823 – November 9, 1827
- Preceded by: James Bates
- Succeeded by: Ambrose Sevier

Personal details
- Born: Henry Wharton Conway; March 18, 1793 Greeneville, Tennessee, U.S.
- Died: November 9, 1827 (aged 34) Napoleon, Arkansas Territory, U.S.
- Party: Democratic-Republican
- Relatives: Conway-Johnson family

Military service
- Allegiance: United States
- Branch/service: United States Navy
- Years of service: 1812–1813
- Rank: Lieutenant
- Battles/wars: War of 1812

Henry Wharton Conway (March 18, 1793 – November 9, 1827) was a United States naval officer during the War of 1812 and a politician in Arkansas Territory, who was elected as a territorial delegate (1823–1827) to the United States House of Representatives for three consecutive congresses. He died in 1827 as a result of wounds from a duel with Robert Crittenden, a former friend and political ally.

== Biography ==
Conway was born into a planter family on March 18, 1793, as the son of Thomas and Ann (née Rector) Conway, in Greene County, Tennessee. He was educated by private tutors. He had two younger brothers who followed him into politics in the West.

== Career ==
During the War of 1812, Conway was commissioned as an ensign in the United States Navy, and was promoted to lieutenant in 1813. In 1817, Conway became a clerk in the U.S. Treasury. Having saved money for his journey, the following year he joined the migration West to the Missouri Territory. In 1820, he moved to the Arkansas Territory. There he became active in territorial politics, forming a friendship and an alliance with Robert Crittenden. His younger brothers James S. and Elias N. Conway also later became politicians in Arkansas after it became a state in 1836; they served as first and fifth governors of the state, respectively. In Arkansas Territory, he was appointed as receiver of public moneys, serving from 1820 through 1821.

Conway was elected in 1822 as a territorial delegate to the Eighteenth Congress and was re-elected to the Nineteenth, and Twentieth Congresses, serving in total from March 4, 1823 until his death. Following political differences in 1825, Conway and Crittenden grew apart, publicizing their feud in newspapers.

== Death and legacy ==
The conflict between Conway and Crittenden resulted in a duel held on October 29, 1827, near Napoleon. Conway was mortally wounded and died several days later on November 9, 1827. He is interred at Scull Cemetery, Arkansas Post, Arkansas.

Conway County, Arkansas, is named after him.

== See also ==
- Conway-Johnson family
- List of members of the United States Congress who died in office (1790–1899)
- List of members of the United States Congress killed or wounded in office

U.S. House of Representatives
Preceded by James Bates	Delegate to the U.S. House of Representatives from Arkansas Territory's at-large congressional district 1823–1827	Succeeded by Ambrose Sevier
