= John Crittenden =

John Crittenden is the name of:

- John Crittenden Sr. (1754–1809), veteran of the American Revolutionary War and member of the Virginia House of Burgesses
- John J. Crittenden (1787–1863), US Senator, Governor of Kentucky, Attorney General of the United States and author of the Crittenden Compromise
