= Daniel Ringo =

American judge (1803–1873)

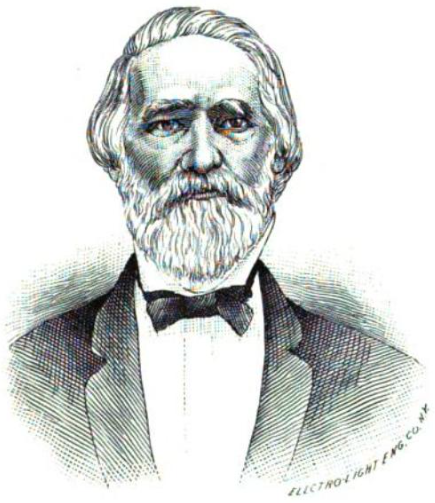

Judge of the United States District Court for the Eastern District of Arkansas Judge of the United States District Court for the Western District of Arkansas
- In office March 3, 1851 – May 6, 1861
- Appointed by: operation of law
- Preceded by: Seat established by 9 Stat. 594
- Succeeded by: Henry Clay Caldwell

Judge of the United States District Court for the District of Arkansas
- In office November 5, 1849 – March 3, 1851
- Appointed by: Zachary Taylor
- Preceded by: Benjamin Johnson
- Succeeded by: Seat abolished

Personal details
- Born: Daniel Ringo; October 27, 1803 Cross Plains, Kentucky, US
- Died: September 3, 1873 (aged 69) Little Rock, Arkansas, US
- Education: read law

Daniel Ringo (October 27, 1803 – September 3, 1873) was a justice of the Arkansas Supreme Court, and later a United States district judge of the United States District Court for the District of Arkansas, the United States District Court for the Eastern District of Arkansas and the United States District Court for the Western District of Arkansas.

== Education and career ==
Born on October 27, 1803, in Cross Plains, Kentucky, Ringo moved to Arkadelphia, Arkansas, in 1820, and became deputy clerk of the district court, and in 1825, clerk. Ringo read law in 1830, and entered private practice in Washington, Arkansas. In 1833 he moved to Little Rock, Arkansas Territory (State of Arkansas from June 15, 1836). where he continued to practice law until 1836. In 1836, he was elected to the Arkansas Supreme Court, drawing the long term of eight years. He was chief justice until 1844, when he was defeated for re-election. A notable ruling he issued while on the state's supreme court was State v. Buzzard, which upheld a ban on concealed carry.

One evaluation of his service on the state supreme court said:

A strong and sagacious man, with the authority which the position of chief justice always gives, would have been able to achieve a most enviable standing, laying the foundation of her jurisprudence broad and deep. Judge Ringo was not the man for this. Studying law in a clerk's office, his attention had been directed to the forms of pleas and entries, not to the broad principles of justice. For him a lawsuit was rather a means of settling nice points of special pleading than of adjusting the rights of parties. In his eyes, the forms of the law were an essential thing. During his whole official career his object was to seek out new refinements of pleading, and he impressed upon our jurisprudence a degree of technicality which it was never able to cast off until the adoption of the Code.

== Federal judicial service ==
Ringo received a recess appointment from President Zachary Taylor on November 5, 1849, to a seat on the United States District Court for the District of Arkansas vacated by the death of Judge Benjamin Johnson. He was nominated to the same position by President Taylor on December 21, 1849. He was confirmed by the United States Senate on June 10, 1850, and received his commission the same day. Ringo was reassigned by operation of law to the United States District Court for the Eastern District of Arkansas and the United States District Court for the Western District of Arkansas on March 3, 1851, to a new joint seat authorized by 9 Stat. 594. His service terminated on May 6, 1861, due to his resignation, which came at the beginning of the American Civil War.

== Later career and death ==
Following his resignation from the federal bench, Ringo served as a Judge of the Confederate District Court for the Districts of Arkansas from 1862 to 1863. He resumed private practice in Little Rock from 1865 to 1873, though "[i]n his later years he did little, for the adoption of the civil code had deprived him of his principal engine of legal warfare, the common-law pleading". He died on September 3, 1873, in Little Rock.

== Sources ==
Legal offices
Preceded by Newly established seat	Justice of the Arkansas Supreme Court; 1836–1844	Succeeded by Thomas Johnson
Preceded by Benjamin Johnson	Judge of the United States District Court for the District of Arkansas; 1849–1851	Succeeded by Seat abolished
Preceded by Seat established by 9 Stat. 594	Judge of the United States District Court for the Eastern District of Arkansas; Judge of the United States District Court for the Western District of Arkansas; 1851–1861	Succeeded by Henry Clay Caldwell
