= Conway Cemetery State Park =

Historic location in Arkansas, US

- Conway Cemetery; Historic State Park
- U.S. National Register of Historic Places
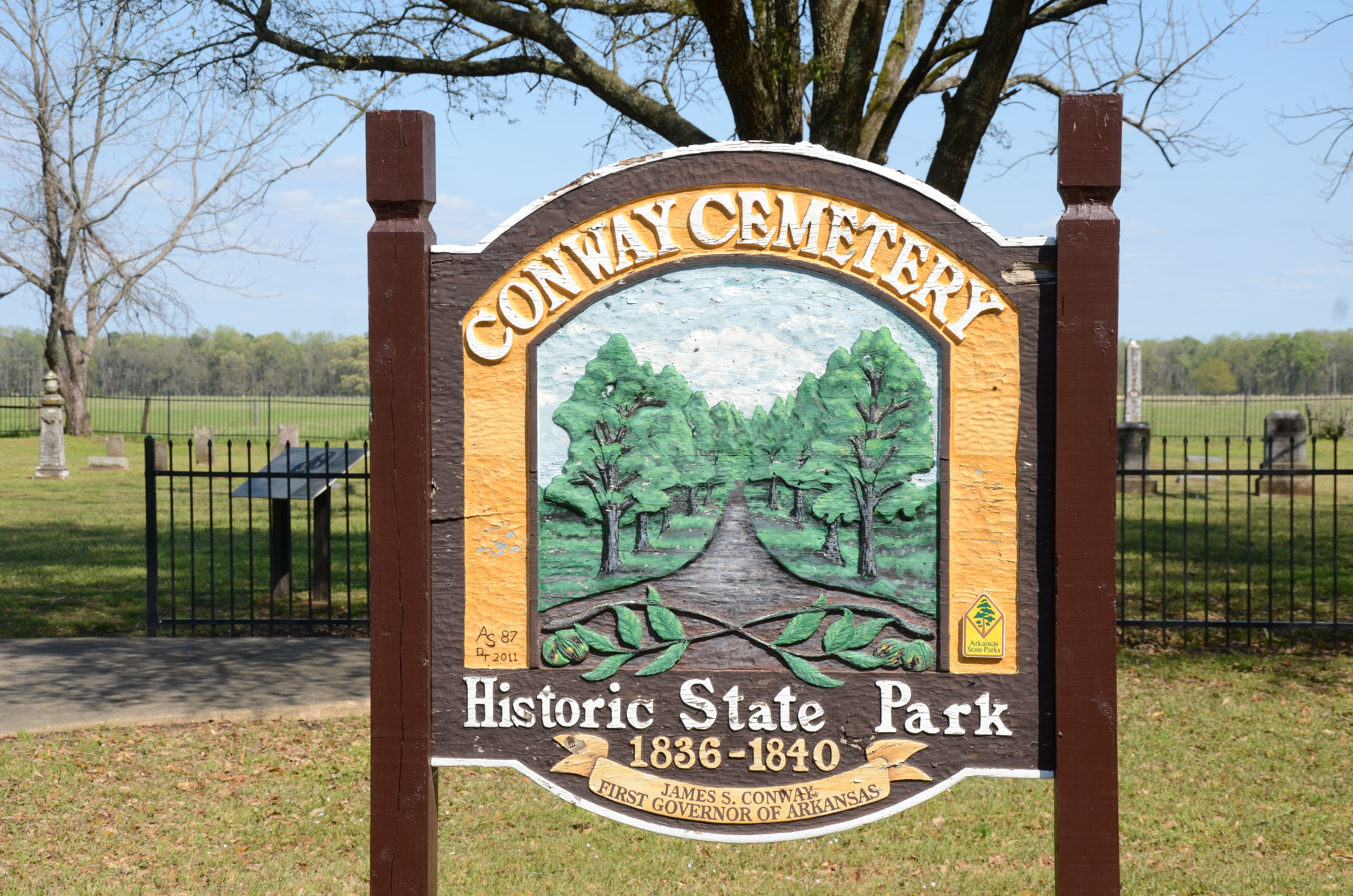

- Location within Arkansas
- Location: Lafayette County, Arkansas
- Nearest city: Bradley, Arkansas
- Coordinates: 33°06′07″N 93°40′59″W
- Area: 11.5 acres (0.047 km^{2})
- Website: Official website
- NRHP reference No.: 77000259
- Added to NRHP: November 23, 1977

Conway Cemetery Historic State Park, officially the Conway Cemetery State Park, is the final resting place of James S. Conway, first governor of Arkansas, and his wife, Mary J. Conway. It is a 11.5-acre (0.047 km^{2}) Arkansas state park in Lafayette County. No recreational or visitors' amenities are available at the state park.

== Description and administrative history ==
The Conway-Johnson family dominated Arkansas politics from territorial days until the American Civil War. James Sevier Conway was the first governor of Arkansas, serving from 1836 to 1840. He began many basic state programs, such as banks, roads, and prisons. Conway retired to his plantation near Bradley, where he died in 1855. Several other prominent figures in early Arkansas politics were buried in the cemetery, including U.S. Senator Ambrose Hundley Sevier.

Locals succeeded in acquiring state protection of the site with the passing of legislation acquiring the site in 1975. After receiving listing on the National Register of Historic Places two years later, the cemetery was given to the Department of Parks, Heritage, and Tourism on March 27, 1984. After paving of a parking lot and addition of picnic tables, the park was admitted to the park system in 1986. The park encompasses the old homesite and family cemetery of the Conway family.

== See also ==
- List of Arkansas state parks
- List of National Historic Landmarks in Arkansas
- National Register of Historic Places listings in Lafayette County, Arkansas
