= William K. Sebastian =

American politician

William Sebastian
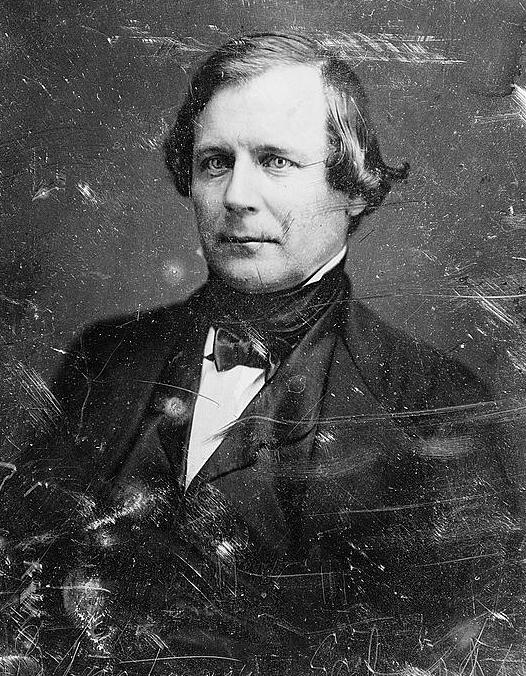

United States Senator from Arkansas
- In office May 12, 1848 – July 11, 1861
- Preceded by: Chester Ashley
- Succeeded by: Alexander McDonald (1868)

President of the Arkansas Senate
- In office November 2, 1846 – May 12, 1848
- Preceded by: John Williamson
- Succeeded by: Richard C. Byrd

Member of the Arkansas Senate from the Phillips County district
- In office November 2, 1846 – May 12, 1848
- Preceded by: M. Irwin
- Succeeded by: Constituency abolished

Personal details
- Born: William King Sebastian; June 12, 1812 Centerville, Tennessee, U.S.
- Died: May 20, 1865 (aged 52) Memphis, Tennessee, U.S.
- Party: Democratic
- Spouse: Amelia Dunn (m. 1838; died 1864)
- Education: Colombia College, Tennessee (BA)

William King Sebastian (June 12, 1812 – May 20, 1865) was an American politician, judge, and lawyer from Helena, Arkansas. He represented Arkansas as a United States Senator, from 1848 to 1861. Sebastian withdrew from the Senate at the start of the Civil War and was later formally expelled by the Senate. He took no active part in the Confederate government and was reinstated by a posthumous resolution in 1877.

== Early life ==
Sebastian was born in Centerville, Tennessee, on June 12, 1812; sometime around 1834 he graduated from Colombia College, also in Tennessee, and began studying law. He moved to Arkansas in 1835, where he was admitted to the bar and began practice in Helena, Arkansas; later he became a cotton planter. From 1835 to 1837 he was a prosecuting attorney; he served as a circuit court judge from 1840 to 1843, in which year he was made an associate justice of the Arkansas Supreme Court. In 1846 he became a member of the Arkansas Senate, serving as its president until 1847. Also in 1846 he served as a presidential elector on the Democratic ticket.

== Political career ==
In 1848, upon the death of Chester Ashley, he was appointed to the United States Senate, subsequently being elected in his own right. He was reelected in 1853 and 1859. During his time in the Senate, he served as the chair of the Committee on Manufactures, as well as on the Committee on Indian Affairs. He supported Superintendent of Indian Affairs for California and Nevada Edward Fitzgerald Beale's plans to form a series of Indian reservations in California, garrisoned by a military post, on government owned land. The Indians were to support themselves by farming. The first of these reservations, the Sebastian Indian Reservation was named for him.

== Later life ==
When the American Civil War began, "he did not resign, as did all the other southern senators save Andrew Johnson, but remained a melancholy and helpless spectator of events". In July 1861 he was expelled for his suspected support of the Confederacy. Sebastian left the Senate and went back to Helena, where he resided and worked as a lawyer during the Civil War. After federal troops occupied Helena, he moved to Memphis, Tennessee, in 1864 and resumed the practice of law; he died there on May 20, 1865, and is buried in a private family cemetery in Phillips County. Sebastian County, Arkansas, is named for him. In 1877, the Senate revoked the resolution of expulsion which they had passed upon Sebastian, and consequently paid the compensation due to his children.

== See also ==
- List of slave owners
- List of United States senators expelled or censured

U.S. Senate
| Preceded by Chester Ashley | U.S. Senator (Class 2) from Arkansas; 1848–1861; Served alongside: Solon Borland, Robert Johnson, Charles B. Mitchel | Vacant Title next held by Alexander McDonald; 1868 |
| Preceded by David Atchison | Chair of the Senate Indian Affairs Committee; 1853–1861 | Succeeded by James Rood Doolittle |
