= Ambrose H. Sevier =

American politician (1801–1848)

Ambrose Hundley Sevier
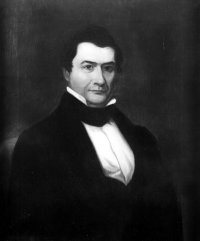

Acting President pro tempore of the United States Senate
- In office December 27, 1845 – December 28, 1845
- Preceded by: Willie Person Mangum
- Succeeded by: David Rice Atchison

United States Senator from Arkansas
- In office September 18, 1836 – March 15, 1848
- Preceded by: (none)
- Succeeded by: Solon Borland

Delegate to the U.S. House of Representatives from Arkansas Territory
- In office February 13, 1828 – June 15, 1836
- Preceded by: Henry W. Conway
- Succeeded by: Statehood achieved

Personal details
- Born: November 4, 1801 Greeneville, Tennessee, US
- Died: December 31, 1848 (aged 47) Little Rock, Arkansas, US
- Party: Democratic
- Spouse: Juliette Johnson Sevier
- Profession: Politician, Lawyer

Ambrose Hundley Sevier (November 4, 1801 – December 31, 1848) was an attorney, politician and planter from Arkansas. A member of the political Conway-Johnson family that dominated the state and national delegations in the antebellum years, he was elected by the legislature as a Democratic U.S. Senator. He served as Speaker of the Arkansas House of Representatives.

== Early life and education ==
Ambrose Hundley Sevier was born near Greeneville, Tennessee in Greene County, Tennessee. Sevier moved to Missouri in 1820 and to Little Rock, Arkansas in 1821. In Arkansas he became clerk of the Territorial House of Representatives. He studied law and was admitted to the bar in 1823.

== Marriage and family ==
Sevier married Juliette Johnson, the sister of Robert Ward Johnson, who also became an influential politician in the state. Their father Benjamin Johnson had gone to Arkansas as the first territorial judge; in 1836 he was appointed as the first federal district judge when the territory became a state. Ambrose and Juliette had several children.

== Political career ==
Sevier was elected to the Territorial House of Representatives and served from 1823 to 1827; he was elected as Speaker of that body in 1827.

He was elected as a Jacksonian Delegate to the 20th US Congress to fill the vacancy caused by the death of Henry Wharton Conway, killed as a result of a duel with a former friend. Sevier was reelected and served as delegate in three successive congresses from 1828 to 1836, when Arkansas was admitted to the Union. Sevier is known as the "Father of Arkansas Statehood".

In 1836 Sevier was elected as the first member of the United States Senate from Arkansas. He was reelected in 1837 and 1843. He resigned from office in 1848. During the 29th Congress, he was allowed to hold the seat of President pro tem of the Senate for a day, though he was not elected to that post. During his tenure, he served as chairman of the Committee on Indian Affairs and was a member of the Committee on Foreign Relations.

In 1848 Sevier was appointed a Commissioner to help negotiate the Treaty of Guadalupe Hidalgo at the end of the Mexican–American War. In December 1848, he was appointed by Polk to head what would later become the International Boundary and Water Commission, but died before being confirmed by the U.S. Senate.

After completing this project, Ambrose Hundley Sevier died the last day of that year on his plantation in Pulaski County, Arkansas. He was buried in the historic Mount Holly Cemetery. The State of Arkansas erected a monument in the cemetery in his honor.

Sevier was part of the powerful "Family" of Democratic politicians in Arkansas, who included his first cousins: Representative Henry Wharton Conway, Governor James Sevier Conway, and Governor Elias Nelson Conway; brother-in-law Senator Robert Ward Johnson, and son-in-law Governor Thomas James Churchill.

== Legacy and honors ==
- He is known as the "Father of Arkansas Statehood."
- Sevier County, Arkansas is named in his honor.

== See also ==
- The Family (Arkansas politics)

U.S. House of Representatives
Preceded by Henry Wharton Conway	Delegate to the U.S. House of Representatives from Arkansas Territory; February 13, 1828 – June 15, 1836	Arkansas admitted to the Union
U.S. Senate
Preceded by (none)	U.S. senator (Class 3) from Arkansas; September 18, 1836 – March 15, 1848; Served alongside: William Savin Fulton and Chester Ashley	Succeeded by Solon Borland
Political offices
Preceded by Hugh Lawson White	Chairman of the Senate Indian Affairs Committee; 1840–1841	Succeeded by James T. Morehead
Preceded by Albert White	Chairman of the Senate Indian Affairs Committee; 1845–1846	Succeeded by Arthur P. Bagby
Preceded by William Allen	Chairman of the Senate Foreign Relations Committee; 1846–1848	Succeeded by Edward A. Hannegan
Preceded by Willie Person Mangum	President pro tempore of the United States Senate; December 27, 1845^{(1)}	Succeeded by David Rice Atchison
Notes and references
1. Sevier was not actually elected President pro tempore of the Senate, but was allowed to 'hold the seat' for a day.
