= Robert Ward Johnson =

American politician (1814–1879)

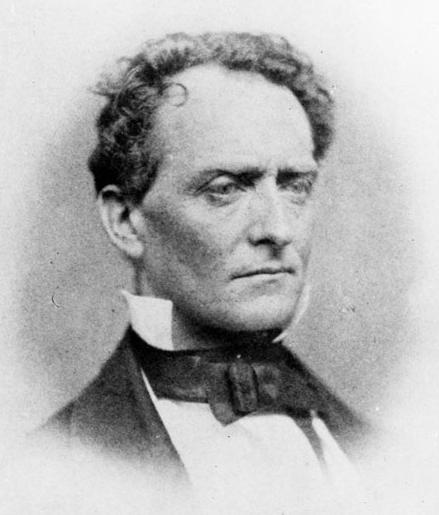
- Johnson in 1858

Confederate States Senator from Arkansas
- In office February 18, 1862 – March 18, 1865
- Preceded by: New constituency
- Succeeded by: Constituency abolished

Delegate from Arkansas to the Provisional Congress of the Confederate States
- In office May 18, 1861 – February 17, 1862
- Preceded by: New constituency
- Succeeded by: Constituency abolished
- In office July 6, 1853 – March 3, 1861
- Preceded by: Solon Borland
- Succeeded by: Charles B. Mitchel

Member of the U.S. House of Representatives from Arkansas's At-large district
- In office March 4, 1847 – March 3, 1853
- Preceded by: Thomas W. Newton
- Succeeded by: Constituency abolished

1st Attorney General of Arkansas
- In office February 3, 1843 – September 25, 1843
- Governor: Archibald Yell
- Preceded by: New office
- Succeeded by: George C. Watkins

Personal details
- Born: July 22, 1814 Scott County, Kentucky, U.S.
- Died: July 26, 1879 (aged 65) Little Rock, Arkansas, U.S.
- Cause of death: Dysentery
- Resting place: Mount Holly Cemetery, Little Rock, Arkansas, U.S. 34°44′15.3″N 92°16′42.5″W
- Party: Democratic
- Spouses: Sarah Frances Johnson (m. 1836–1862) Laura S. Johnson (m. 1863)
- Children: 6
- Parent: Benjamin Johnson (father)
- Relatives: Conway-Johnson family
- Education: St. Joseph's College
- Occupation: Farmer, planter, lawyer
- Profession: Agriculture, legal

Robert Ward Johnson (July 22, 1814 – July 26, 1879) was an American planter and lawyer who served as the senior Confederate States senator for Arkansas, a seat that he was elected to in 1861. He previously served as a delegate from Arkansas to the Provisional Congress of the Confederate States from 1861 to 1862.

== Early life and education ==
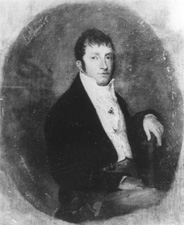
Portrait of Robert Ward Johnson in his younger years

Robert Ward Johnson was born on July 22, 1814, in Scott County, Kentucky, to Benjamin and Matilda (née Williams) Johnson. His father had three brothers who were elected as U.S. Congressmen and the family was politically prominent in the state. His grandfather had acquired thousands of acres of land in the area at the end of the eighteenth century. The family were slaveholders. His siblings included a sister Juliette. His paternal uncles were Richard Johnson, a United States Representative and Senator, and vice president of the United States under Martin Van Buren; and his brothers James Johnson and John Telemachus Johnson, older and younger, respectively, who were each elected as U.S. Representatives from Kentucky.

In 1821 when Johnson was seven, his parents moved the family to Arkansas Territory, where his father had been appointed as Superior Judge. They settled in Little Rock. His father was appointed in 1836 as the first federal district judge in the new state of Arkansas. Johnson was later sent back to Kentucky to study at the Choctaw Academy, which his uncle Richard Johnson had founded in 1825 on his farm near Georgetown, primarily to educate Choctaw boys from the Southeast in the English language and European-American culture. He was handsomely paid by the federal government.

At times, 200–300 boys attended the academy. The Choctaw students were at the school in the period prior to the Indian Removal in the 1830s of the "Five Civilized Tribes", but they were under pressure in the Southeast from encroaching settlers. His uncle kept the school going into the late 1830s, after some peoples had been forcibly relocated to Indian Territory west of the Mississippi River. The young Johnson went on to study at St. Joseph's College, an academy in Bardstown, and graduated.

After St. Joseph's, Johnson returned to Little Rock. He studied law as a legal apprentice and was admitted to the bar in 1835. He married Sarah Frances Smith in 1836. They had six children together; three survived to adulthood. Sarah died in 1862, during the American Civil War. The next year, Johnson at the age of 49 married her younger sister, Laura. They had no children.

== Political career ==
In Little Rock, Johnson soon became involved in Democratic Party politics. He was elected as the prosecuting attorney for Little Rock and served from 1840 to 1843. He effectively acted as the state's attorney.

His sister Juliette married Ambrose Sevier, who was later elected as US Senator from Arkansas. Both Sevier and Johnson became part of The Family, a group of men related by marriage and politics, who dominated the state Democratic Party and politics, and its national representation in the antebellum years.

Prior to the American Civil War, Johnson moved his family to Helena, Arkansas, in the Mississippi Delta, where he established his law practice. Johnson was elected from there, beginning in 1846, to the Thirtieth, Thirty-first, and Thirty-second Congresses. He became chairman of the House Committee on Indian Affairs. In this period, his brother-in-law Sevier was chair of the Senate Committee on Indian Affairs.

Johnson declined to run for reelection in 1852. He was appointed by the legislature to the United States Senate to fill the unexpired term of Senator Solon Borland. In 1855, he was elected by the legislature to the seat, serving the full term until 3 March 1861. After the outbreak of the American Civil War, he served as a delegate to the Provisional Government of the Confederate States in 1862. He served as a member of the Confederate Senate from 1862 to 1865.

== Later life and death ==
The American Civil War ended Johnson's political career. Property damage and the abolition of slavery ruined him economically. After the war, he practiced law in Washington, D.C., for more than a decade. Returning to Arkansas in the late 1870s, he ran unsuccessfully for reelection to the Senate in 1878. Johnson died in Little Rock in 1879. He is buried in the historic Mount Holly Cemetery there.

== See also ==
- List of Freemasons
- List of Confederate States senators
- List of people from Kentucky
- List of slave owners
- List of United States representatives from Arkansas
- List of United States senators from Arkansas

Legal offices
New office	Attorney General of Arkansas; 1843	Succeeded by George C. Watkins
U.S. House of Representatives
Preceded by Thomas W. Newton	Member of the U.S. House of Representatives from Arkansas's at-large congressional district 1847–1853	Constituency abolished
U.S. Senate
Preceded by Solon Borland	U.S. senator (Class 3) from Arkansas; 1853–1861; Served alongside: William K. Sebastian	Succeeded by Charles B. Mitchel
Political offices
New constituency	Delegate from Arkansas to the Provisional Congress of the Confederate States; 1861–1862; With: Albert Rust; Hugh F. Thomason; William W. Watkins; Augustus H. Garland	Constituency abolished
Confederate States Senate
New constituency	C.S. Senator (Class 1) from Arkansas; 1862–1865; With: Charles B. Mitchel 1862–1864; Augustus H. Garland 1864–1865	Constituency abolished
