= James Sevier Conway =

1st governor of Arkansas

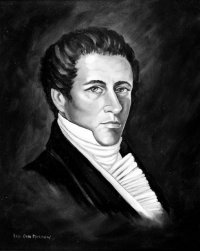

2nd and 8th Postmaster of Walnut Hill, Arkansas
- In office July 3, 1845 – August 9, 1846
- Nominated by: James K. Polk
- Preceded by: Fleetwood Herndon
- Succeeded by: Francis E. Goodwin
- In office November 15, 1854 – December 19, 1854
- Nominated by: Franklin Pierce
- Preceded by: A. C. J. Phillips
- Succeeded by: Ann I. Sevier

6th Postmaster of Conway, Arkansas
- In office February 18, 1843 – July 2, 1845
- Nominated by: John Tyler
- Preceded by: Gideon Ruyle
- Succeeded by: Office abolished

1st Governor of Arkansas
- In office September 13, 1836 – November 4, 1840
- Preceded by: William S. Fulton (as Governor of Arkansas Territory)
- Succeeded by: Archibald Yell

1st Postmaster of Conway, Arkansas Territory
- In office May 24, 1828 – November 7, 1832
- Nominated by: John Quincy Adams; Andrew Jackson
- Preceded by: Office established
- Succeeded by: Thomas Quigg

Delegate to 1836 Arkansas Constitutional Convention
- In office January 4, 1836 – January 30, 1836
- Constituency: Hot Spring County

Personal details
- Born: December 4, 1796 Greene County, Tennessee, US
- Died: March 3, 1855 (aged 58) Lafayette County, Arkansas, US
- Resting place: Conway Cemetery State Park; 33°06′06.8″N 93°40′59.0″W
- Party: Democratic
- Spouse: Mary Jane Bradley (m. 1826)
- Children: 10
- Relatives: Conway-Johnson family

James Sevier Conway (December 9, 1796 – March 3, 1855) was an American politician who served as the first governor of Arkansas from 1836 to 1840.

== Early life ==
James Sevier Conway was born on December 4, 1796, in Greene County, Tennessee, to Thomas and Ann (née Rector) Conway. Conway's father was born in Pittsylvania County, Virginia, in 1771. His paternal ancestors originated in Conwy, Wales. Among Conway’s siblings were politicians Elias N Conway, William B Conway and Henry W Conway. One of his cousins was Henry M Rector, the sixth governor of Arkansas. Thomas employed private tutors to teach his seven sons and three daughters. In 1818, the family moved to St. Louis, where Conway learned the art of land surveying from his uncle William Rector, surveyor-general in Illinois, Missouri, and Arkansas. In 1820, Conway resigned a Cole County, Missouri, circuit clerk's position to serve as deputy-surveyor in the newly established Arkansas Territory, where he purchased a tract of land in Hempstead (present-day Lafayette) County. While living there, Conway met Mary Jane Bradley, who had migrated with her family from Wilson County, Tennessee. They were married December 21, 1825, and had ten children, five of whom died in infancy or early childhood.

== Political career ==
In 1832, Conway became the surveyor-general in Arkansas Territory and served in that position until 1836. He was the elected to the new office of governor when Arkansas became a state in 1836. His administration focused on developing schools and roads. He ordered the militia to patrol the western frontier and worked to have the federal arsenal built at Little Rock. He worked to get funding for a state penitentiary. He pressed the General Assembly for establishment of a state library and university but was unsuccessful. Conway left office in 1840 and returned to Lafayette County where he served three nonconsecutive terms as postmaster.

== Death and legacy ==
Conway died from the complications of pneumonia on March 3, 1855. His remains were interred in the Conway Cemetery (present-day Conway Cemetery State Park), near Bradley, Arkansas. He helped establish Lafayette Academy in Lafayette County, Arkansas. Present-day Conway, Arkansas, is named after him.

== See also ==
- Conway-Johnson family

Party political offices
First	Democratic nominee for Governor of Arkansas; 1836	Succeeded by Archibald Yell
Political offices
Preceded by William S. Fulton as Governor of Arkansas Territory	Governor of Arkansas; 1836 – 1840	Succeeded by Archibald Yell
