= United States Senate Committee on Indian Affairs =

Standing committee of the United States Senate

Senate Indian Affairs Committee
Permanent select committee
- Active United States Senate; 119th Congress

History
- Formed: February 11, 1977

Leadership
- Chair: Lisa Murkowski (R); Since January 3, 2025
- Vice Chair: Brian Schatz (D); Since January 3, 2025

Structure
- Seats: 11 members
- Political parties: Majority (6): Republican (6); Minority (5): Democratic (5)

Website
- www.indian.senate.gov

The Senate Committee on Indian Affairs is a committee of the United States Senate charged with oversight in matters related to the American Indian, Native Hawaiian, and Alaska Native peoples. A Committee on Indian Affairs existed from 1820 to 1947, after which it was folded into the Committee on Interior and Insular Affairs. A new Native Affairs Committee was created in 1977, initially as a select committee, as a result of the detachment of indigenous affairs from the new Committee on Energy and National Resources, which had succeeded the old Committee on Interior and Insular Affairs. The committee was initially intended to be temporary, but was made permanent in 1984. The committee tends to include senators from Western and Plains states, who have more Native American constituents.

== History ==
=== Summary ===
In 1977, the Senate approved S.Res. 4 which re-established the Committee on Indian Affairs as a temporary select committee. The Select Committee was to disband at the close of the 95th Congress, but following several interim extensions, the Senate voted to make the Committee permanent on June 6, 1984. The committee has jurisdiction to study the unique problems of American Indian, Native Hawaiian, and Alaska Native peoples and to propose legislation to alleviate these difficulties. These issues include, but are not limited to, Native education, economic development, land management, trust responsibilities, health care, and claims against the United States. Additionally, all legislation proposed by Members of the Senate that specifically pertains to American Indians, Native Hawaiians, or Alaska Natives is under the jurisdiction of the committee.

=== Early era ===
Until 1946, when the Legislative Reorganization Act abolished both the House and Senate Committees on Indian Affairs, the Senate Committee on Indian Affairs had been in existence since the early 19th century. After 1946, Native affairs legislative and oversight jurisdiction was vested in subcommittees of the Interior and Insular Affairs Committees of the House of Representatives and the Senate. While this subcommittee arrangement may not have specifically reflected a diminishment of the consideration given Native affairs by the Congress, the revised arrangement historically coincided with a 20-year hiatus in Native affairs known as the "Termination Era" – a period in which the prevailing policy of the United States was to terminate the Federal relationship with Native tribes or transfer jurisdiction over tribal lands to the states.

By the mid-1960s, this Termination philosophy was in decline as a failed policy and the Congress began to include Native tribes in legislation designed to rebuild the social infrastructure of the Nation and provide economic opportunities for economically depressed areas. In the early 1970s the Termination era was decisively ended with the enactment of the Menominee Restoration Act of 1973. Although a number of important legislative initiatives affecting Natives were enacted in the early 1970s, it became clear that the existing subcommittee structure was not providing an adequate forum for legislating appropriate solutions to problems confronting Native country. Legislative jurisdiction over Native affairs was fragmented among a number of committees. Overall, more than 10 committees in the Congress were responsible for Indian affairs, a situation which resulted in a sometimes disjointed treatment of Native affairs and in an often haphazard development of Federal Native policy.

=== Re-establishment of committee ===
In 1973, Senator James Abourezk introduced Senate Joint Resolution 133 to establish a Federal commission to review all aspects of policy, law, and administration relating to affairs of the United States with American Native tribes and people. The Senate and the House of Representatives both adopted S.J. Res. 133 and on January 2, 1975, the Resolution was signed into law by the President, thus establishing the American Indian Policy Review Commission. As the work of this Commission progressed, it became readily apparent that a full Senate committee with full legislative and oversight authority was needed to receive the report of the American Indian Policy Review Commission and to act upon its recommendations. Indeed, one of the final recommendations of the commission was that a full-fledged Native Affairs Committee be established in the Senate.

At the same time the commission was formulating its recommendation for the establishment of a Native Affairs Committee, the Senate was developing a far-reaching proposal for reorganization of the entire Senate committee system. Under this proposal, the Subcommittee on Indian Affairs under the Committee on Interior and Insular Affairs was to be abolished with its natural resource functions to be distributed among other newly formed Senate committees and its human resources functions to be transferred to the Senate Committee on Labor and Human Resources. In view of the pending report of the American Indian Policy Review Commission and its anticipated recommendations, however, the Senate revamped its committee reorganization proposal to include the establishment of a temporary select committee to receive the commission's report and to act on its recommendations. Thus, there was included within S.Res. 4 of February 4, 1977, the Committee System Reorganization Amendments of 1977, a provision to establish a Select Committee on Native Affairs with full jurisdiction over all proposed legislation and other matters relating to Native affairs. With the commencement of the 96th Congress, the Select Committee on Indian Affairs was to expire and jurisdiction over Native matters was to be transferred to the Senate Committee on Labor and Human Resources.

As the Select Committee on Indian Affairs grappled with the report of the American Indian Policy Review Commission and the many other Native issues that were presented to it during the 95th Congress, it became increasingly evident that if the Congress was to continue to meet its constitutional, legal, and historical responsibilities in the area of Native affairs, an ongoing legislative committee with adequate expertise and resources should be re-established in the Senate.

S.Res. 405, to make the Select Committee on Indian Affairs a permanent committee of the Senate, was introduced by Senator Abourezk on February 22, 1978. The measure was amended by the Rules Committee to extend the life of the committee for two years until January 2, 1981, and was agreed to by the Senate on October 14, 1978. In the 96th Congress, Senator John Melcher, who at the time was chair of the Select Committee, introduced S.Res. 448 to make it a permanent committee. The Resolution had 28 cosponsors, and was reported by the Rules Committee with an amendment to extend the select committee to January 2, 1984, and to expand the membership to seven members commencing in the 97th Congress. S. Res. 448 was adopted by the Senate on December 11, 1980.

=== Permanent committee ===
On April 28, 1983, Senator Mark Andrews, Chair of the Select Committee on Indian Affairs in the 98th Congress, introduced S.Res. 127 to make the committee a permanent committee. This Resolution had 28 cosponsors. On November 1, 1983, the Committee on Rules and Administration voted unanimously to report the Resolution without amendment, and the Resolution was so reported on November 2, 1983 (S. Rept. 98–294). On November 18, the last day of the first session of the 98th Congress, the Senate agreed to an extension of the select committee to July 1, 1984, in order to allow time for later debate. By the time the Resolution was brought to the floor for consideration there were 60 cosponsors. On June 4, 1984, the Select Committee on Indian Affairs was made a permanent committee of the Senate. In 1993, the Select Committee on Indian Affairs was redesignated as the Committee on Indian Affairs.

== Members, 119th Congress ==
Majority	Minority
Lisa Murkowski, Alaska, Chair; John Hoeven, North Dakota; Steve Daines, Montana; Markwayne Mullin, Oklahoma (until March 23, 2026); Mike Rounds, South Dakota; Jerry Moran, Kansas; Alan Armstrong, Oklahoma (from March 27, 2026)	Brian Schatz, Hawaii, Vice Chair; Maria Cantwell, Washington; Catherine Cortez Masto, Nevada; Tina Smith, Minnesota; Ben Ray Luján, New Mexico

== Historical committee membership ==
=== 118th Congress ===
Majority	Minority
Brian Schatz, Hawaii, Chair; Maria Cantwell, Washington; Jon Tester, Montana; Catherine Cortez Masto, Nevada; Tina Smith, Minnesota; Ben Ray Luján, New Mexico	Lisa Murkowski, Alaska, Vice Chair; John Hoeven, North Dakota; Steve Daines, Montana; Markwayne Mullin, Oklahoma; Mike Rounds, South Dakota

=== 117th Congress ===
Majority	Minority
Brian Schatz, Hawaii, Chair; Maria Cantwell, Washington; Jon Tester, Montana; Catherine Cortez Masto, Nevada; Tina Smith, Minnesota; Ben Ray Luján, New Mexico	Lisa Murkowski, Alaska, Vice Chair; John Hoeven, North Dakota; James Lankford, Oklahoma; Steve Daines, Montana; Mike Rounds, South Dakota; Jerry Moran, Kansas

=== 116th Congress ===
Majority	Minority
John Hoeven, North Dakota, Chair; John Barrasso, Wyoming; Lisa Murkowski, Alaska; James Lankford, Oklahoma; Steve Daines, Montana; Jerry Moran, Kansas; Martha McSally, Arizona (until December 2, 2020)	Tom Udall, New Mexico, Vice Chair; Maria Cantwell, Washington; Jon Tester, Montana; Brian Schatz, Hawaii; Catherine Cortez Masto, Nevada; Tina Smith, Minnesota

=== 115th Congress ===
Majority	Minority
John Hoeven, North Dakota, Chair; John Barrasso, Wyoming; Lisa Murkowski, Alaska; James Lankford, Oklahoma; Steve Daines, Montana; Mike Crapo, Idaho; Jon Kyl, Arizona; Jerry Moran, Kansas	Tom Udall, New Mexico, Vice Chair; Maria Cantwell, Washington; Jon Tester, Montana; Brian Schatz, Hawaii; Heidi Heitkamp, North Dakota; Catherine Cortez Masto, Nevada; Tina Smith, Minnesota

== Chairs ==
=== Chairs of the Senate Committee on Indian Affairs, 1820–1947 ===
Name	Party	State	Start	End
David Holmes	Democratic-Republican	MS	1820	1821
Henry Johnson	Democratic-Republican	LA	1821	1823
Thomas Benton	Democratic-Republican (1823–1825)	MO	1823	1828
Thomas Benton	Jacksonian (1825–1828)	MO	1823	1828
Hugh White	Democratic	TN	1828	1832
George Troup	Democratic	GA	1832	1833
Hugh White	Whig	TN	1833	1840
Ambrose Sevier	Democratic	AR	1840	1841
James Morehead	Whig	KY	1841	1842
Albert White	Whig	IN	1842	1845
Ambrose Sevier	Democratic	AR	1845	1846
Arthur Bagby	Democratic	AL	1846	1847
David Atchison	Democratic	MO	1847	1853
William Sebastian	Democratic	AR	1853	1861
James Doolittle	Republican	WI	1861	1867
John Henderson	Republican	MO	1867	1869
James Harlan	Republican	IA	1869	1873
William Buckingham	Republican	CT	1873	1875
William Allison	Republican	IA	1875	1879
Richard Coke	Democratic	TX	1879	1881
Henry Dawes	Republican	MA	1881	1893
James Jones	Democratic	AR	1893	1895
Richard Pettigrew	Republican	SD	1895	1899
John Thurston	Republican	NE	1899	1901
William Stewart	Republican	NV	1901	1905
Moses Clapp	Republican	MN	1905	1911
Robert Gamble	Republican	SD	1911	1913
William Stone	Democratic	MO	1913	1914
Henry Ashurst	Democratic	AZ	1914	1919
Charles Curtis	Republican	KS	1919	1921
Selden Spencer	Republican	MO	1921	1923
John Harreld	Republican	OK	1923	1927
Lynn Frazier	Republican	ND	1927	1933
Burton Wheeler	Democratic	MT	1933	1936
Elmer Thomas	Democratic	OK	1936	1945
Joseph O'Mahoney	Democratic	WY	1945	1947

From 1947 to 1977, Indian affairs were the responsibility of the Senate Committee on Interior and Insular Affairs, which was superseded by the U.S. Senate Committee on Energy and Natural Resources in 1977.

=== Chairs of the Senate Select Committee on Indian Affairs, 1977–1993 ===
Name	Party	State	Start	End
James Abourezk	Democratic	SD	1977	1979
John Melcher	Democratic	MT	1979	1981
William Cohen	Republican	ME	1981	1983
Mark Andrews	Republican	ND	1983	1987
Daniel Inouye	Democratic	HI	1987	1993

=== Chairs of the Senate Committee on Indian Affairs, 1993–present ===
Name	Party	State	Start	End
Daniel Inouye	Democratic	HI	1993	1995
John McCain	Republican	AZ	1995	1997
Ben Campbell	Republican	CO	1997	2001
Daniel Inouye	Democratic	HI	2001	
Ben Campbell	Republican	CO	2001	
Daniel Inouye	Democratic	HI	2001	2003
Ben Campbell	Republican	CO	2003	2005
John McCain	Republican	AZ	2005	2007
Byron Dorgan	Democratic	ND	2007	2011
Daniel Akaka	Democratic	HI	2011	2013
Maria Cantwell	Democratic	WA	2013	2014
Jon Tester	Democratic	MT	2014	2015
John Barrasso	Republican	WY	2015	2017
John Hoeven	Republican	ND	2017	2021
Brian Schatz	Democratic	HI	2021	2025
Lisa Murkowski	Republican	AK	2025	present

== Vice chairs ==
The committee refers to its ranking minority member as vice chair.

Name	Party	State	Start	End
Dewey Bartlett	Republican	OK	1977	1979
William Armstrong	Republican	CO	1979	
Mark Hatfield	Republican	OR	1979	1981
John Melcher	Democratic	MT	1981	1987
Dan Evans	Republican	WA	1987	1989
John McCain	Republican	AZ	1989	1995
Daniel Inouye	Democratic	HI	1995	2001
Ben Campbell	Republican	CO	2001	2003
Daniel Inouye	Democratic	HI	2003	2005
Byron Dorgan	Democratic	ND	2005	2007
Craig Thomas	Republican	WY	2007	
Lisa Murkowski	Republican	AK	2007	2009
John Barrasso	Republican	WY	2009	2015
Jon Tester	Democratic	MT	2015	2017
Tom Udall	Democratic	NM	2015	2021
Lisa Murkowski	Republican	AK	2021	2025
Brian Schatz	Democratic	HI	2025	present
