= Charlotte Andrews Stephens =

American educator

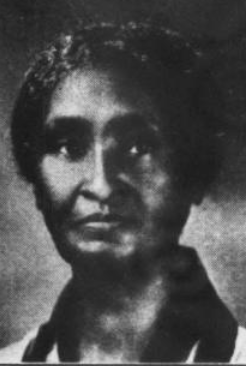
- Charlotte A. Stephens, from a 1924 publication
- Born: May 9, 1854; Little Rock, Arkansas
- Died: December 17, 1951; Little Rock, Arkansas
- Occupation: Teacher

Charlotte Andrews Stephens (May 9, 1854 – December 17, 1951) was the first African American to teach in Little Rock, Arkansas. She taught for seventy years and an elementary school was named for her in 1910.

== Early life and education ==
Charlotte Elizabeth Andrews was born in Little Rock, the daughter of William Wallace Andrews and Caroline Williams Andrews. She was born into slavery, and lived in the household of senator Chester Ashley; her father had enthusiasm for both education and the Methodist faith. She attended Oberlin College for three years in the 1870s.

== Career ==
Andrews began teaching at fifteen, at the freedmen's school she had attended. She taught for seventy years, until her retirement in 1939, at age 85. She taught Latin, German, and science. Among her notable students were black composers Florence Price and William Grant Still. At various times, she was principal of the Capital Hill graded school, librarian at Dunbar High School, and acting principal of Union High School. In 1909, there was a reception celebrating her 40th anniversary as a teacher, and she was presented with a silver tea service; the Arkansas Democrat account of the event reported that "she is at present one of the most active and wide-awake teachers in the M. W. Gibbs High School'. At the age of 70, she was honored with a master's degree from Shorter College in North Little Rock. An elementary school was named for her in 1910, and sat on land that she donated for the purpose.

Stephens was a charter member of Little Rock's chapter of the National Association of Colored Women (NACW).

== Personal life and legacy ==
Andrews married John Herbert Stephens, who was a cabinetmaker, a teacher, and a local official. They had eight children. She died in 1951, at the age of 97. In 1973, the Academic Press of Arkansas published a biography, Charlotte Stephens: Little Rock's First Black Teacher by Adolphine Fletcher Terry. Stephens Elementary School, named for her in 1910, is still a public school in Little Rock, in a new building as of 2001.
