= State v. Buzzard =

1842 case determined by the Supreme Court of Arkansas

- Court: Supreme Court of Arkansas
- Decided: 1842

State v. Buzzard is an 1842 case determined by the Supreme Court of Arkansas in which the defendant Buzzard was charged with violating an Arkansas State law that prohibited the carrying of concealed weapons. He claimed that this law infringed upon his Constitutional right to keep and bear arms enumerated in the Second Amendment. Arkansas Trial Court struck down the state law so the state appealed to the Arkansas Supreme Court. A majority held that the sole intent of the Second Amendment was for the States to have a militia to protect themselves against a national army that could infiltrate and overthrow them. In its view because of this original intent it was never meant to apply as a right granted to individuals.

== Legal question ==
Does Arkansas state law regarding the illegal carrying of a concealed weapon infringe on citizens Second Amendment rights? Does this Arkansas state law that made illegal the carrying of a concealed weapon infringe on citizens Second Amendment rights?

== Decision of the court ==
The Supreme Court of Arkansas reversed the order of the trial court. In the majority opinion Chief Justice Daniel Ringo states that the state legislature is within its power to make laws such as these which help "the preservation of peace and domestic tranquility". (State v. Buzzard, 1842). Chief Justice Ringo also mentioned in his decision that by participating within American democracy citizens must allow certain rights that may have restrictions placed upon them in order to reap all the advantages that do come with American Government. Chief Justice Ringo felt strongly that "...if subject to no legal regulation or limitation whatever, would tend to unhinge society, and most probably soon cause it wither to fall back to its natural state, or seek refuge and security from the disorders and suffering incident to such licensed invasion of the rights of others in some arbitrary or despotic form of government...".(State v. Buzzard 1842) The majority also stated that the intent of the Second Amendment was for the States to have a militia to protect themselves against a national army that could infiltrate and overthrow them. Because of this original intent the Second Amendment was never meant to apply as a right granted to individuals.

== Dissent ==
Justice Lacy wrote a dissenting opinion. He states that if the right to keep and bear arms is in the Constitution it must be a useful right granted to all. For him, if we give this power of regulating gun control to the state legislature it "takes the arms out of the hands of the people, and places them in the hands of the legislature...".(Gillman, Graber,& Whittington 2013) A man's arms are his private property so, for Justice Lacy he should not be legally deprived of them. Also he believes that "only when a citizen breaks his covenant with his government, he forfeits the protection of her laws..." If he does not break any laws that men should be entitled to all the rights which government provides.

== Relationship to Modern Gun Rights ==
General sentiment in Jacksonian America was that right to bear arms was limited to militia service. The debate over the Second Amendment in this era centered, as it continues to do today, around the relationship between self-defense, militia service, and the right to bear arms. In State v Buzzard, Chief Justice Ringo contends that the right to bear arms was intended to apply to the militia due to a consensus that a well-regulated militia offered the best security available to a free state. Since the people of the United States were intimidated by the idea of a large army in times of peace, a lesser means of security was to be provided which would allow states to defend themselves from conspirators and attacks on civil liberties. For this reason, the State of Arkansas did not interpret the second amendment as an individual right. Furthermore, according to Chief Justice Ringo, to carry a concealed weapon would imply that individuals may seek redress in their own manner for invasions of their own liberty. However, to ensure justice and protect liberty are the duties of the government, not the individual. This decision is the precedent of choice for contemporary Americans who champion a narrow reading of the Second Amendment.

== Implications for the Second Amendment ==
Buzzard believed that the state of Arkansas was restricting his Second Amendment right to bear arms. The Arkansas state constitution states, "...legislature may regulate the wearing of war arm, but may not prohibit it on a person's own premises or when people are acting in aid of a military officer." (Goss, 2011, p. 35 ) Buzzard was not at his residence when he was arrested for carrying a concealed weapon. The Supreme Court of Arkansas did find that making a regulation regarding a concealed weapon was not against the Second Amendment of the constitution. The ruling was that, "A statute making the wearing of concealed weapons a penal offense is constitutional." (Goss, 2011, p. 35)

Two of the justices in this case did not view the militia and the right to bear arms as two separate entities, which is why the State of Arkansas believed that regulating the concealment of a weapon, is constitutional. Chief Justice Ringo's opinion in the case demonstrates that the right to bear arms exists not only for the militia, but also for the use of public defense (Leider, 2014). In regards to public defense, he believes that community members should be able to protect themselves if people were to, "...conspire to overthrow the established institutions of the country." (Leider, 2014, p. 1617) He explains in his opinion that the right to bear arms was, "...surely not designed as an immunity to those who should so keep or bear their arms as to injure or endanger the private rights of others, or is in any manner prejudice the common interests of society." (Gillman, Graber, & Whittington, 2013, p. 235) This Amendment should not be perceived as a way to protect oneself from other community members if one is in a harmful situation. It was created during a period when having a large army during a time of peace was rejected, so the best way society members could protect the State, during this time when there was no army, would be through their own use of bearing arms (Gilman, Graber, & Whittington, 2013).

Justice Dickinson has a similar opinion regarding how the Second Amendment should be interpreted. He believes that the militia should have the right to keep and bear arms, but that the state can regulate how this occurs. The state can only regulate the right to bear arms when, it is "...not required for military purposes." (Leider, 2014) He also states in his opinion, "The militia constitutes the shield and defense for the security of a free State; and to maintain that freedom...arms and the right to use them for that purpose are solemnly guarantied." (Leider, 2014, p. 1617) He justifies the regulation of a concealed weapon because during the time that this law was enforced the state was not under attack, so the use of the militia was not needed.

The two justices explain in their opinions that the right to bear arms is necessary, especially if the citizens of the state need to overthrow the government. According to these Justice's the main focus of this amendment is to allow citizens to bear arms, to ensure that they will be able to protect themselves from the government. Although they are given this right, it cannot be taken advantage of because then it will harm those in society. This is why Arkansas has created laws to protect society members from weapons, and to make them aware if someone is carrying one on their person.

== Addressed in future cases ==
United States v. Miller, the government used State v. Buzzard as, "...one of the three American cases holding that the right to bear arms only belongs to people in a militia." (Leider, 2014, p. 1617)

== Related Cases ==
Haile v. State (1882), Fife v. State (1876), Wilson v. State (1878)
