= William S. Fulton =

American lawyer (1795–1844)

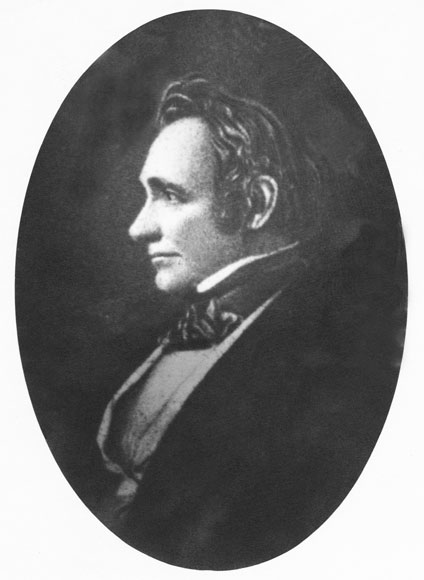

United States Senator from Arkansas
- In office September 18, 1836 – August 15, 1844
- Preceded by: new constituency
- Succeeded by: Chester Ashley

4th Governor of Arkansas Territory
- In office March 9, 1835 – June 15, 1836
- President: Andrew Jackson
- Preceded by: John Pope
- Succeeded by: James Conway

2nd Secretary of the Arkansas Territory
- In office April 8, 1829 – February 23, 1835
- President: Andrew Jackson
- Preceded by: Robert Crittenden
- Succeeded by: Lewis Randolph

Personal details
- Born: William Savin Fulton; June 2, 1795 Cecil County, Maryland, U.S.
- Died: August 15, 1844 (aged 49) Little Rock, Arkansas, U.S.
- Resting place: Mount Holly Cemetery, Little Rock, Arkansas, U.S. 34°44′15.3″N 92°16′42.5″W
- Party: Democratic (Jacksonian)
- Spouse: Matilda Nowland

Military service
- Allegiance: United States
- Branch/service: Maryland Militia
- Years of service: 1813–1814
- Rank: Corporal
- Unit: Captain Nicholson's Company of Artillery
- Battles/wars: War of 1812: Battle of Baltimore

William Savin Fulton (June 2, 1795 – August 15, 1844) was an American lawyer and politician who served as a United States senator from Arkansas from 1836 until his death in 1844. He had previously served as the fourth governor of Arkansas Territory, from 1835 to 1836, and the second secretary of the Arkansas Territory from 1829 to 1835.

== Early life ==
Fulton was born in Cecil County, Maryland, and graduated from Baltimore College in 1813. He had intended to study law, but with the outbreak of the War of 1812 he enlisted in a company of volunteers at Fort McHenry. Fulton was military secretary to General Andrew Jackson during the Seminole War in 1818. After the war, Fulton moved to Gallatin, Tennessee, where he was admitted to the bar in 1817. He owned slaves.

== Political career ==
In 1820, Fulton settled in Florence, Alabama. In 1821, he was elected to the Legislature. He was appointed Secretary of the Arkansas Territory by President Andrew Jackson in 1829. Fulton served as Secretary until 1835, when he was appointed Governor of the Territory. When Arkansas was admitted as a state in 1836, he became one of its first Senators. In the United States Senate he became a member of the Democratic Party. Fulton remained a Senator until his death in 1844.

== Death ==
Fulton died at his home in Little Rock and was buried in the historic Mount Holly Cemetery in Little Rock.

== Legacy ==
Fulton County, Arkansas is named for him.

== See also ==
- List of governors of Arkansas
- List of members of the United States Congress who died in office (1790–1899)

Government offices
Preceded by Robert Crittenden	Secretary of the Arkansas Territory; 1829–1835	Succeeded by Lewis Randolph
Preceded by John Pope	Governor of Arkansas Territory; 1835–1836	Succeeded by James Conway as Governor of Arkansas
U.S. Senate
New constituency	U.S. Senator (Class 2) from Arkansas; 1836–1844; With: Ambrose Hundley Sevier	Succeeded by Chester Ashley
