= John Crittenden Sr. =

American politician (1754–1809)

John Crittenden (c. 1754 – 1809) was an American politician and military officer who was a major in the Continental Army during the American Revolutionary War and a member of the Virginia House of Delegates from 1790 to 1805. He was the scion of a powerful family of politicians and military officers who played key roles in the politics of several southern states through the end of the 19th century.

Crittenden was born in about 1754 at New Kent, Virginia, to Henry Crittenden and Margaret Butler. On August 21, 1783, he married Judith Harris, daughter of John Harris and Obedience Turpin. John and Judith had nine children including the statesmen John Jordan Crittenden and Robert Crittenden. He was an original member of the Virginia Society of the Cincinnati. He died in Kentucky.
