= James Miller (general) =

1st governor of Arkansas Territory from 1819 to 1824

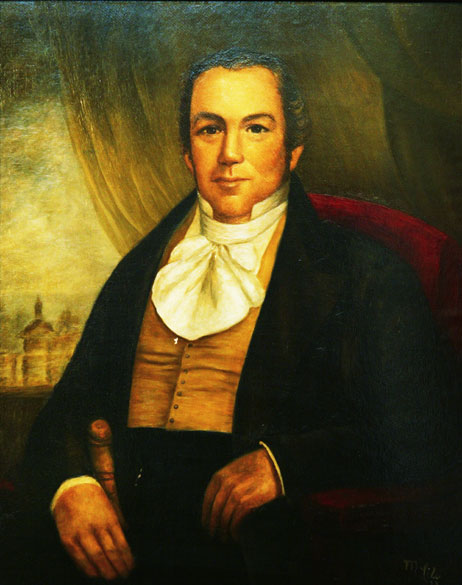

1st Governor of Arkansas Territory
- In office December 26, 1819 – December 27, 1824
- President: James Monroe
- Preceded by: Robert Crittenden (acting)
- Succeeded by: George Izard

Personal details
- Born: April 25, 1776 Peterborough, Province of New Hampshire, British America
- Died: July 7, 1851 (aged 75) Temple, New Hampshire, U.S.
- Resting place: Harmony Grove Cemetery; Salem, Massachusetts; 42°31′33.21″N 70°54′52.22″W
- Spouse(s): Martha Ferguson; Ruth Flint
- Children: 1
- Parents: James Miller, Sr.; Catharine Gregg
- Education: Williams College
- Nickname: "Hero of Lundy's Lane"

Military service
- Allegiance: United States
- Service: United States Army
- Years of service: 1808–1819
- Rank: Brevet Brigadier-General
- Commands: 6th Infantry Regiment; 21st Infantry Regiment
- Battles: War of 1812; Battle of River Canard; Battle of Maguagon; Battle of Detroit (POW); Battle of Niagara; Battle of Erie

James Miller (April 25, 1776 – July 7, 1851) was a senior officer of the United States Army who commanded infantry in the Canadian Theater of the War of 1812. After the war, he served as the first governor of Arkansas Territory from 1819 to 1824. He also served as the superintendent of Indian affairs for the territory. It was during his term as governor, and partly due to his influence, that the territory's capital was moved from Arkansas Post to Little Rock.

== Early life and education ==
James Miller was born in Peterborough, New Hampshire, to James and Catharine (née Gregg) Miller. He attended an academy at Amherst, Massachusetts, and then Williams College. After Martha's death, he married Ruth Flint. Miller was a descendant of Thomas Flint, an Englishman who migrated to Concord, Massachusetts. He had a law practice in Greenfield, New Hampshire, from 1803 to 1808.

== Military service ==
Miller joined the New Hampshire state militia and commanded an artillery unit, until General Benjamin Pierce noticed him and recommended that he be commissioned as a major in the regular army. Miller joined with the 4th Infantry Regiment in 1808. In 1811, Miller's unit went to fight Indians in Vincennes, Indiana, where he was promoted to colonel. In May 1812, his regiment moved to Detroit, Michigan. He was the commander during the Battle of Maguagon. Shortly afterwards, Miller was taken prisoner following the Siege of Detroit and was later exchanged. In 1814, Miller was colonel of the 21st Infantry Regiment and led his men in the capture of the British artillery at the Battle of Niagara. His "I will try, sir!" quote became famous and he earned the name of "Hero of Lundy's Lane". Miller was brevetted brigadier-general, presented a gold medal by resolution of Congress on November 8, 1814, and a sword by the State of New York.

== Governor of Arkansas Territory ==
Appointed governor of Arkansas Territory by President James Monroe on March 3, 1819, Miller resigned from the army, but did not leave New England for his governorship until September. He traveled to Washington, D.C. first, where he learned that he would also serve as the superintendent of Indian affairs for the Arkansas Territory. He traveled to Pittsburgh, Pennsylvania, and acquired armaments for the territorial militia. He then traveled down the Ohio and Mississippi rivers with the armaments in tow, arriving at Arkansas Post on December 26, on a vessel flying flags reading "Arkansaw" and "I will try, sir!"

Due to Miller's tardiness, Robert Crittenden, the secretary of the territory, had been running the state and filling necessary appointments which were validated by Congress. Miller focused his attentions on finding a suitable location for a territorial capital. Since a number of influential men, including Miller, in the territorial legislature had purchased lots in the Little Rock area, the bill moving the capital from Arkansas Post to Little Rock passed the territorial legislature.

As superintendent of Indian affairs, Miller dealt with the considerable debate over Quapaw, Cherokee, and Choctaw land claims and the desire for American whites to take the land for themselves. To make matters more confusing for Miller, warfare between the Cherokee and the Osage erupted within the territory in 1821. From the beginning of his term, it was clear that he did not plan to stay in Arkansas, as his wife remained in New Hampshire. Miller left the torrid Arkansas summer for cooler New Hampshire in April 1821, was elected a member of the American Antiquarian Society on June 28, 1821, returning the following November. In his absences, Crittenden ran Arkansas and made decisions regarding Indian affairs. In June 1823, he left Arkansas and did not return at all that year.

== Later life and death ==
In the fall of 1824, Miller was elected to the House of Representatives in New Hampshire but never took office. Instead he was appointed collector of the Port of Salem, a post he served in until 1849. It is in this role that he is portrayed as the General in Nathaniel Hawthorne's The Custom-House, an Introductory to The Scarlet Letter. He died at Temple, New Hampshire of a stroke and was buried in Harmony Grove Cemetery at Salem, Massachusetts.

== Memorials ==
Miller County, Arkansas, and Miller State Park in Peterborough, New Hampshire, are both named after him. Fort Miller in Marblehead, Massachusetts, was renamed for him circa 1861.

== See also ==
- List of Congressional Gold Medal recipients
- List of governors of Arkansas
- List of people from New Hampshire
- List of Williams College people

Government offices
Preceded by Robert Crittenden; Acting	Governor of Arkansas Territory; 1819–1824	Succeeded by George Izard
Preceded by Willam Lee	Collector of the Port of Salem; 1824–1849	Succeeded by Ephraim Miller
