= Solon Borland =

American politician, journalist, physician and military officer (1808–1864)

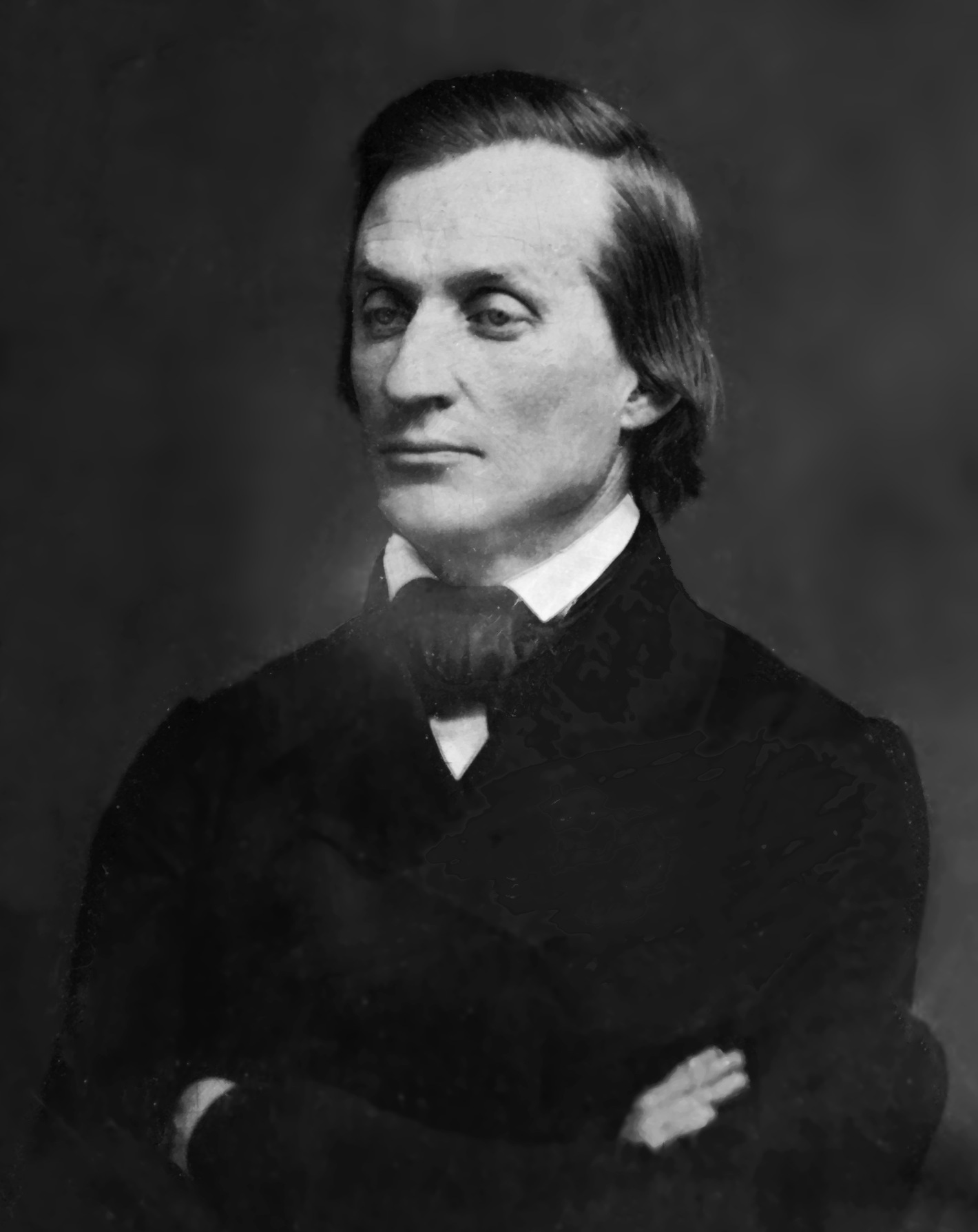
- Portrait of Borland by Mathew Brady

Envoy Extraordinary and Minister Plenipotentiary (Nicaragua)
- In office April 18, 1853 – April 17, 1854
- President: Franklin Pierce
- Preceded by: John B. Kerr
- Succeeded by: John H. Wheeler

United States Senator from Arkansas
- In office April 24, 1848 – March 3, 1853
- Preceded by: Ambrose Hundley Sevier
- Succeeded by: Robert Ward Johnson

Personal details
- Born: September 21, 1808 Nansemond County, Virginia, US
- Died: January 1, 1864 (aged 55) Harris County, Texas, Confederate States of America
- Resting place: Old City Cemetery, Houston, Texas, US; 29°46′06.5″N 95°22′04.6″W
- Party: Democratic
- Spouses: Hildah Wright (m. 1831; died 1837) Eliza Buck Hart (m. 1839; died 1842) Mary Isabel Melbourne (m. 1845)
- Education: Louisville Medical Institute (MD)

Military service
- Allegiance: United States; Confederate States
- Service: United States Volunteers; Confederate States Army
- Years of service: 1846–1847 (U.S.); 1861–1862 (C.S.)
- Rank: Major (U.S.); Colonel (C.S.)
- Commands: Company B, Arkansas Mounted Infantry Regiment (July 1846); 3rd Arkansas Cavalry Regiment (1861–62)
- Battles: Mexican–American War (POW); Battle of Churubusco; Battle of Chapultepec; Battle for Mexico City; American Civil War; Trans-Mississippi Theater
- Monuments: Borland Memorial Marker, Mount Holly Cemetery, Little Rock, Arkansas

Solon Borland (September 21, 1808 – January 1, 1864) was an American politician, journalist, medical doctor and military officer. He served as a United States Senator from Arkansas from 1848 to 1853. Later in life, he served as an officer of the Confederate States Army, including as commander of a cavalry regiment in the Trans-Mississippi theater of the American Civil War.

== Early life ==
Borland was born on September 21, 1808, in Nansemond County, Virginia, to Thomas Borland, a native of Scotland, and Harriet Godwin Borland. When he was a youth, his family moved to Murfreesboro, North Carolina, where he attended Hertford Academy. Borland also studied medicine in Philadelphia and Louisville. As a captain in 1831, he led a company of Virginia militia forces that were dispatched to Southampton County to fight Nat Turner's Rebellion. He owned slaves himself.

== Politics ==
Borland was elected as a United States Senator to fill the unexpired term of Ambrose H. Sevier. His views were generally of a disunionist version, and he was not popular with many Senate members. During an 1850 debate over Southern rights (i.e. slavery), he physically attacked Mississippi Senator Henry S. Foote. He discovered soon after his return to Little Rock, Arkansas, that his views were not popular at home, either. In 1852, he opposed the decision of sending Commodore Perry to open Japan to international trade on grounds that the leaders of that country did not offend U.S. interests by refusing to open their country to international trade. Borland resigned from the United States Senate in 1853 and was appointed as Envoy Extraordinary and Minister Plenipotentiary (Nicaragua).

Immediately after his arrival in Managua, Borland called for the U.S. Government to repudiate the Clayton–Bulwer Treaty, and for the American military to support Honduras in the event of a possible war with Great Britain. In a public address in Nicaragua, he stated that it was his greatest ambition to see Nicaragua "forming a bright star in the flag of the United States". He was reprimanded for this by Secretary of State William Marcy. While leaving Greytown in May, 1854, Borland interfered with the local arrest of an American citizen. A crowd had gathered, and a bottle was thrown which hit Borland in the face. Enraged, he reported the incident to the U.S. president, who promptly dispatched a gunboat, and demanded an apology. When none was given, Greytown was bombarded and destroyed.

Borland returned to Little Rock in October 1854, and resumed his medical practice and operation of his pharmacy. Borland declined a nomination from President Pierce as governor of the New Mexico Territory. However he remained active in local politics, and very vocal as to his views on state's rights and secession.

== Military ==
=== Mexican–American War ===
During the Mexican–American War, Borland was commissioned major of the Arkansas Mounted Infantry Regiment serving under Archibald Yell. Borland served throughout the war, having turned over his newspaper business to associates. He was taken as a prisoner of war by the Mexican army on January 23, 1847, just south of Saltillo. He escaped, and was discharged when his regiment was disbanded and mustered out in June, but continued in the army as volunteer aide-de-camp to General William J. Worth during the remainder of the campaign, from the Battle of Molino del Rey to the capture of Mexico City on September 14, 1847.

=== American Civil War ===
At the start of the American Civil War, Borland was appointed as a commander of Arkansas Militia by Arkansas Governor Henry M. Rector, and ordered to lead the expedition that seized Fort Smith, Arkansas, in the first days of the war, despite the fact that Arkansas had not yet seceded. By the time Borland and his forces arrived in Fort Smith, the Federal troops had already departed, and there were no shots fired. He was replaced as commander at the Arkansas Secession convention less than a month later, but he was able to obtain a position as a commander for Northeast Arkansas. For a time in 1861 he commanded the depot at Pitman's Ferry, near Pocahontas, Arkansas, responsible for troop deployments and supplies. Borland's only son with his third wife, George Godwin Borland, had joined the Confederate States Army despite being only 16 years of age, and would later be killed in action. Borland's first wife, Huldah G. Wright (1809–1837), bore him a son Harold who served in the Confederate States Army as a major, assigned to the Eastern Sub-district of Texas of the Trans-Mississippi Department.

Borland helped recruit troops for the Confederacy during this period, helping to raise the 3rd Arkansas Cavalry Regiment on June 10, 1861, becoming its first colonel. The regiment was sent to Corinth, Mississippi, but without Borland. It would eventually serve under Major-General Joseph Wheeler, seeing action in the Second Battle of Corinth and the Battle of Hatchie's Bridge, along with other battles as a part of the Army of Mississippi. However, Borland never left Arkansas.

While in command of northern Arkansas, he ordered an embargo of goods to end price speculation, which was rescinded by Governor Rector. Borland protested that a governor could not countermand an order from a Confederate official, but in January 1862 his order was countermanded by the Confederate States Secretary of War Judah P. Benjamin. In declining health and resenting that embarrassment, Borland resigned from further service to the Confederacy in June 1862, moving to Dallas County, Arkansas. He died on January 1, 1864, aged 55, in Harris County, Texas. His burial place is in the old City Cemetery, Houston.

== Journalism ==
In 1843, following his second wife's death, Borland moved to Little Rock, where he founded the Arkansas Banner, which became an influential newspaper in statewide Democratic Party politics. Three years later, Borland challenged the editor of the rival Arkansas Gazette, a Whig newspaper, to a duel due to a slander published against him.

In October 1855, Borland, with Albert Pike and Christopher C. Danley, abandoned the Democratic Party, claiming the party had become abolitionist. Danley, who was an editor for the aforementioned Arkansas Gazette, took ownership from William E. Woodruff in 1853 and turned it into a mouthpiece for the Know Nothing party, which Danley and Borland had joined in October 1855.

== See also ==
- List of Arkansas adjutants general
- List of Freemasons
- List of University of Louisville people

Military offices
Preceded by Colonel Albert Pike	Adjutant General of Arkansas; 1846–1848	Succeeded by Colonel John S. Roane
New regiment	Commanding Officer of the 3rd Arkansas Cavalry Regiment; 1861–1862	Succeeded by Colonel Samuel G. Earle
U.S. Senate
Preceded by Ambrose Hundley Sevier	U.S. senator (Class 3) from Arkansas; 1848–1853; Served alongside: Chester Ashley, William K. Sebastian	Succeeded by Robert Ward Johnson
Diplomatic posts
Preceded by John B. Kerr	Envoy Extraordinary and Minister Plenipotentiary (Nicaragua); 1853–1854	Succeeded by John H. Wheeler
