= Benjamin Johnson (judge) =

American judge

Judge of the United States District Court for the District of Arkansas
- In office June 29, 1836 – October 2, 1849
- Appointed by: Andrew Jackson
- Preceded by: Seat established by 5 Stat. 50
- Succeeded by: Daniel Ringo

Personal details
- Born: Benjamin Johnson; January 22, 1784 Johnson Station, District of Kentucky, Virginia
- Died: October 2, 1849 (aged 65) Lexington, Kentucky
- Education: read law

Benjamin Johnson (January 22, 1784 – October 2, 1849) was a United States district judge of the United States District Court for the District of Arkansas.

== Education and career ==
Born on January 22, 1784, in Johnson Station (now Great Crossing) in what was Fayette County, District of Kentucky, Virginia (now Scott County, Kentucky), Johnson read law. He entered private practice in Georgetown, Kentucky. He was a planter in Scott County, Kentucky. He was a Judge of the Kentucky Circuit Court. He was a Judge of the Superior Court of the Arkansas Territory from 1821 to 1836.

== Federal judicial service ==
Following the admission of the State of Arkansas to the Union on June 15, 1836, Johnson was nominated by President Andrew Jackson on June 27, 1836, to the United States District Court for the District of Arkansas, to a new seat authorized by 5 Stat. 50. He was confirmed by the United States Senate on June 29, 1836, and received his commission the same day. His service terminated on October 2, 1849, due to his death in Lexington, Kentucky.

== Sources ==
Legal offices
Preceded by Seat established by 5 Stat. 50	Judge of the United States District Court for the District of Arkansas; 1836–1849	Succeeded by Daniel Ringo
