= Robert Crittenden =

1st secretary of Arkansas Territory from 1819 to 1829

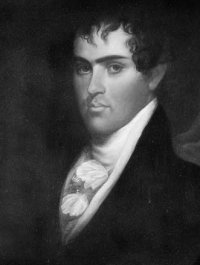

1st Secretary of the Arkansas Territory
- In office July 4, 1819 – April 8, 1829
- Governor: James Miller; George Izard; John Pope
- Preceded by: Position established
- Succeeded by: William S. Fulton

Governor of Arkansas Territory
- Acting
- In office July 4, 1819 – December 26, 1819
- President: James Monroe
- Preceded by: Position established
- Succeeded by: James Miller

Personal details
- Born: January 1, 1797 Woodford County, Kentucky, U.S.
- Died: December 18, 1834 (aged 37) Vicksburg, Mississippi, U.S.
- Party: Democratic-Republican
- Spouse: Ann Morris (m. 1822)
- Children: 4
- Relatives: John Crittenden (father)

Military service
- Allegiance: United States
- Branch/service: United States Army
- Years of service: 1814–1815; 1817–1818
- Rank: Captain
- Commands: Crittenden's Company of Kentucky Life Guards
- Battles/wars: War of 1812; First Seminole War

Robert Crittenden (January 1, 1797 – December 18, 1834) was an American lawyer who served as the first secretary of the Arkansas Territory from 1819 to 1829. He also served as the acting governor of Arkansas Territory from July to December 1819. Crittenden co-founded the Rose Law Firm.

== Early life, education, and military service ==
Robert Crittenden was born in Woodford County, Kentucky, to John and Judith (née Harris) Crittenden. His father was a Kentucky pioneer from Virginia, who had been a major in the Continental Army. Crittenden had a brother, John, who later served as a U.S. senator. His great-nephew was politician Thomas T. Crittenden Jr. Robert Crittenden was educated privately and read the law as a legal apprentice to prepare for passing the bar.

== Secretary of the Arkansas Territory ==
President James Monroe appointed Crittenden secretary of the Arkansas Territory in 1819. Crittenden served in this role through 1829. From July to December 1819, he served as acting governor while James Miller was delayed for an extended period en route to Arkansas Territory. Crittenden called the first territorial legislature into session and took responsibility for organizing the new territory. He amassed considerable political power. Crittenden was a primary leader in preparing the territory for statehood. He was appointed as United States Commissioner for negotiating the 1824 Treaty with the Quapaw Indians.

== Conway–Crittenden duel ==
By 1827, he and his former friend, Henry Conway, a territorial representative, had come into conflict on political issues and finally had a duel. He mortally wounded Conway near Napoleon, Arkansas, on October 29, 1827, who died several days later. Crittenden lived at the end of his life in Vicksburg, Mississippi.

== Legacy ==
Crittenden County, Arkansas, and the Robert Crittenden Chapter (established January 15, 1951) of the Daughters of the American Revolution in West Memphis, Arkansas, are named after him.

Government offices
New office	Governor of Arkansas Territory; Acting; 1819	Succeeded by James Miller
New office	Secretary of the Arkansas Territory; 1819–1829	Succeeded by William S. Fulton
