= Missouri Territory =

Territory of the United States of America from 1812 to 1821

Territory of Missouri
- Organized incorporated territory of United States
- 1812–1821
- Flag of the United States

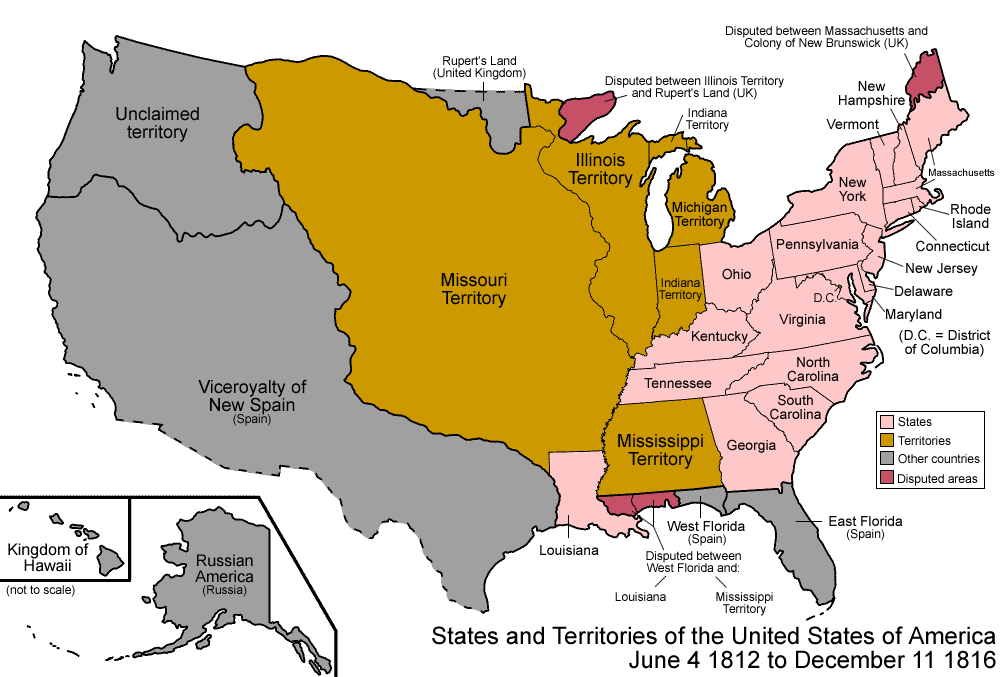
- Map of the Territory of Missouri in 1812
- Capital: St. Louis
  - Type: Organized incorporated territory
- History
  - Renaming of Louisiana Territory: 4 June 1812
  - Arkansas Territory established: March 2, 1819
  - Missouri statehood: 10 August 1821
Preceded by
Louisiana Territory
Succeeded by
Territory of Arkansas
Missouri
Unorganized territory
Indian Territory
Rupert's Land

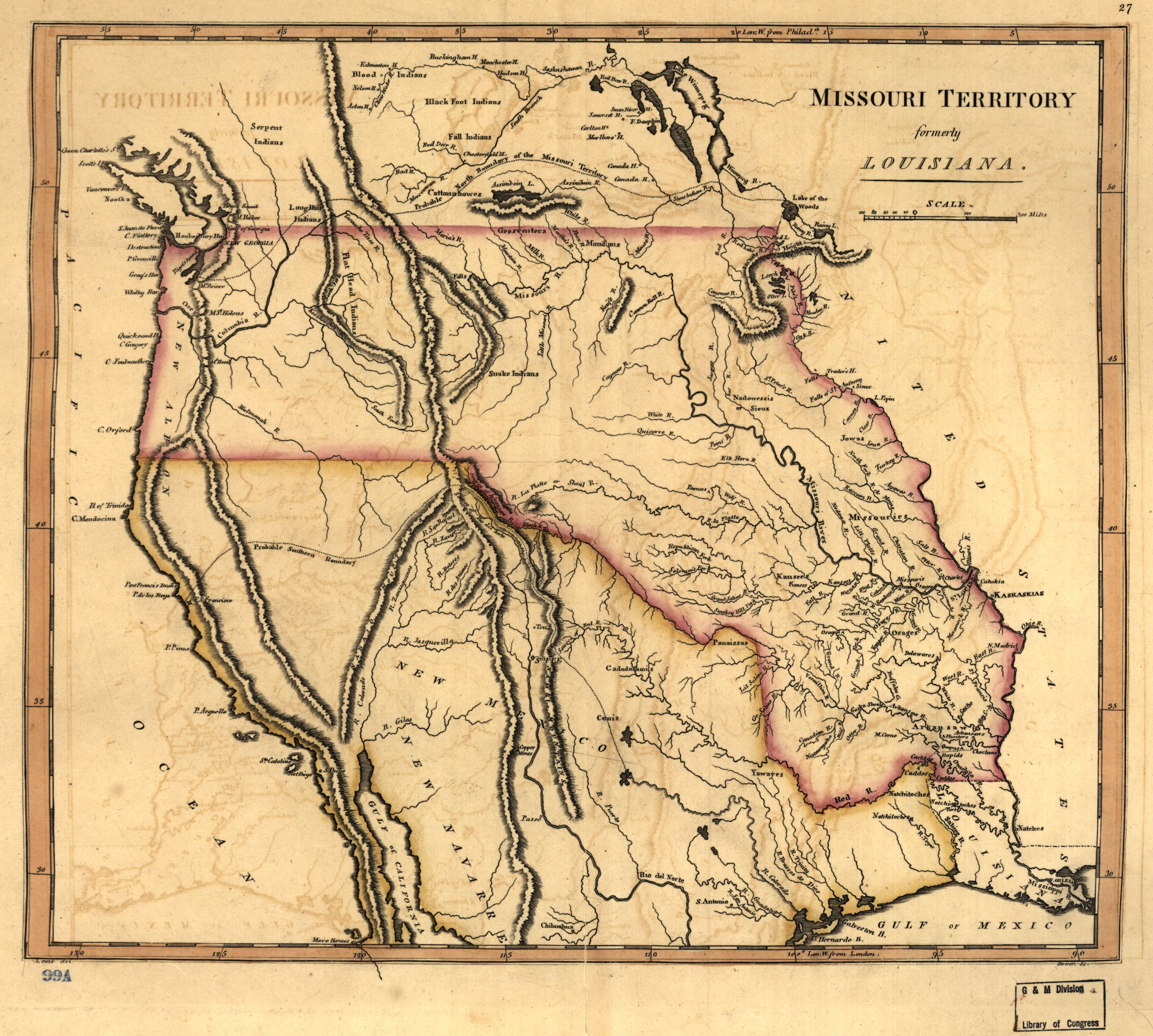
The Missouri Territory (1812–1821), formerly the Louisiana Territory (1804–1812), and earlier the Louisiana Purchase of 1803 from the First French Empire of Emperor Napoleon I / Napoleon Bonaparte, from Library of Congress, Washington, D.C., 1814 map

The Territory of Missouri was an organized incorporated territory of the United States that existed from June 4, 1812, until August 10, 1821. In 1819, the Territory of Arkansas was created from a portion of its southern area. In 1821, a southeastern portion of the territory was admitted to the Union as the State of Missouri, and the rest became unorganized territory for several years.

== History ==
The Missouri Territory was first known as the larger Louisiana Territory since 1804 (encompassing most of the 1803 Louisiana Purchase from the French Empire) and was renamed by the U.S. Congress on June 4, 1812, to avoid any confusion with the new 18th state of Louisiana (further to the south on the lower Mississippi River with its river port city of New Orleans), which had been admitted to the Union on April 30, 1812.

On October 1, 1812, newly appointed fourth Territorial Governor William Clark (1770–1838, served 1813–1820), organized the five administrative districts of the former Louisiana Territory into the first five counties of the then new Missouri Territory.

The Anglo-American Convention of 1818 established the northern boundary of the six years old Missouri Territory with the adjacent British North America (future Dominion of Canada) territory of Rupert's Land at the 49th parallel north of latitude. This gave the Missouri Territory the Red River Valley (Red River of the North), south of the 49th parallel and gave to Rupert's Land that slice of upper Missouri River Valley north of the 49th parallel. The Adams–Onís Treaty of 1819, between the Kingdom of Spain and the United States, established the southern and western boundaries of the old Louisiana Purchase territory of 1803, with the Royal Spanish territories of Spanish Texas and Santa Fe de Nuevo México. As a result of the protracted negotiations, the United States surrendered a significant portion of the Missouri Territory claimed in the southwest to Spain in exchange for the peninsula of Spanish Florida further east. The Convention of 1818 and the subsequent Adams–Onís Treaty the following year, would be the last significant losses of United States claimed territories from the continental contiguous United States, although the cession of lands north of the 49th parallel would turn out to be the only permanent cession of U.S. territory (the territories ceded to the Kingdom of Spain in 1819 would be re-taken by the U.S. by force, following the Annexation of Texas Republic (1845) and the Mexican–American War, (1846–1848), along with the Mexican Cession of territories further west of 1849.

On March 2, 1819, all of the Missouri Territory directly south of the parallel 36°30' north, except the so-called Missouri Bootheel between the Mississippi River and the Saint Francis River north of the 36th parallel north, was designated the new federal Territory of Arkansaw. (The spelling of Arkansaw would be changed a few years later, although the proper pronunciation of the name would be debated until 1881). The southeastern portion of the remaining Missouri Territory was admitted to the Union as the 21st State of Missouri on August 10, 1821.

St. Louis on the west bank of the Mississippi River was the capital of the Missouri Territory.

The remaining portion of the territory to the north, northwest, west and southwest, consisting of the present states of Iowa, Nebraska, and the Dakotas, most of Kansas, Wyoming, Montana, and parts of Colorado, Minnesota and New Mexico, effectively became reverted to the status of unorganized territory after 1821, when Missouri became the 21st state. Thirteen years later in 1834, the portion in the north and east of the upper Missouri River was attached to the Michigan Territory around the Great Lakes. Over time, various federal territories in the West were created in whole or in part from its remaining area of unorganized status, as follows:

Indian Territory (1834), added with future Oklahoma (1890), Iowa (1838), Minnesota (1849), Kansas and Nebraska (both 1854), Colorado and Dakota (both 1861), Idaho (1863), Montana (1864), and Wyoming (1868).

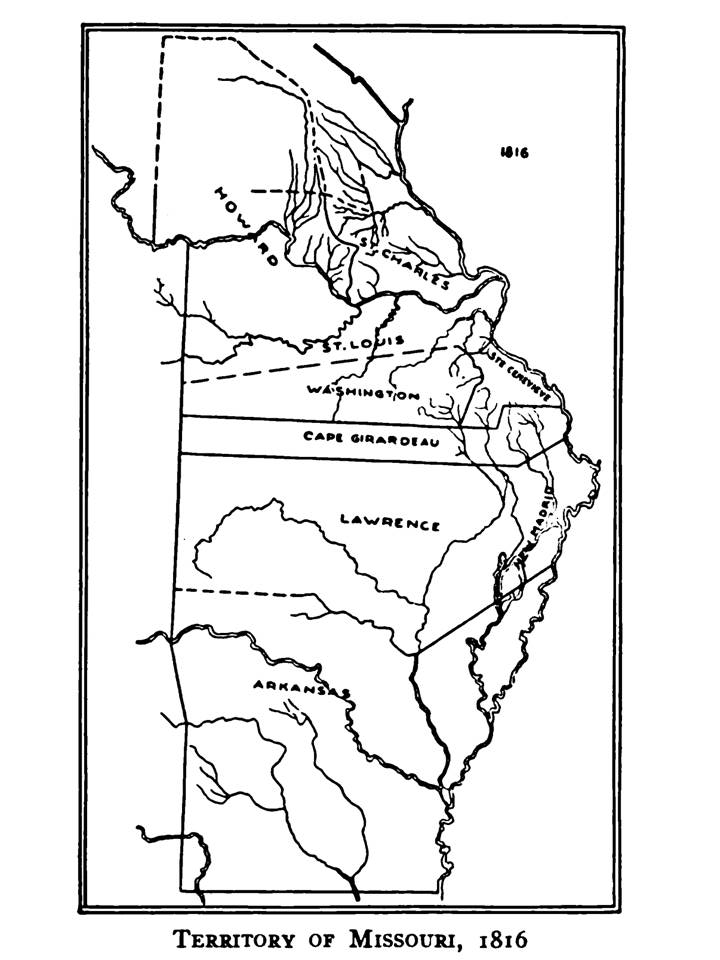
Missouri Territory, 1816, showing county boundaries

In the 1820 United States census, 15 counties in the old Missouri Territory reported the following population counts:

Rank	County	Population
1	Howard	13,426
2	St. Louis	10,049
3	Cooper	6,959
4	Cape Girardeau	5,968
5	Ste. Genevieve	4,962
6	St. Charles	3,970
7	Pike	3,747
8	Montgomery	3,074
9	Washington	2,769
10	Franklin	2,379
11	New Madrid	2,296
12	Madison	2,047
13	Jefferson	1,835
14	Lincoln	1,662
15	Wayne	1,443
	Missouri Territory	66,586

== See also ==
- Historic regions of the United States
- History of Missouri
- Territorial evolution of the United States
