= Arkansas Territory =

Territory of the United States from 1819 to 1836

- Organized incorporated territory of the United States
- 1819–1836
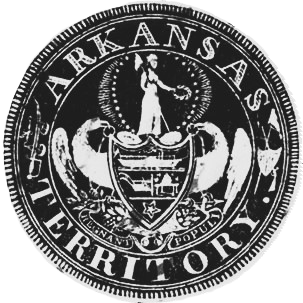
- Flag of the United States (1822–1836) Seal (1835 design)

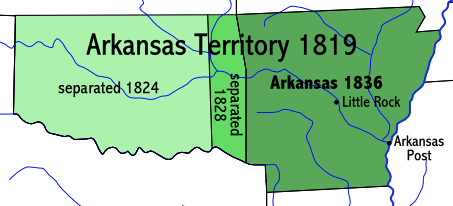
- Capital: Arkansas Post (1819–1821); Little Rock (1821–1836)
- Area
  - Coordinates: 34°44′10″N 92°19′52″W
- Government
  - Type: Organized incorporated territory
  - Motto: "Regnat populi" (Latin) "The people reign."
- President
  - 1819–1825: James Monroe
  - 1825–1829: John Quincy Adams
  - 1829–1836: Andrew Jackson
- Governor
  - 1819–1824: James Miller
  - 1825–1828: George Izard
  - 1829–1835: John Pope
  - 1835–1836: William Fulton
- Legislature: General Assembly
  - Upper house: Legislative Council
  - Lower house: House of Representatives
- History
  - Affirmed by Congress: 2 March 1819
  - Officially became territory: July 4, 1819
  - Indian Trade and Intercourse Act: June 30, 1834
  - Treaty of Washington: May 6, 1828
  - Statehood of Arkansas: 15 June 1836
Preceded by	Succeeded by
Missouri Territory	Arkansas; Unorganized territory
- Today part of: United States: Arkansas; Oklahoma

The Arkansas Territory was a territory of the United States from July 4, 1819, to June 15, 1836, when the final extent of Arkansas Territory was admitted to the Union as the State of Arkansas. Arkansas Post was the first territorial capital (1819–1821) and Little Rock was the second (1821–1836).

== Etymology ==
The name Arkansas has been pronounced and spelled in a variety of fashions. The region was organized as the Territory of Arkansaw on March 2, 1819, but the final extent of the territory was admitted to the Union as the State of Arkansas on June 15, 1836. The name was historically pronounced /ˈɑːrkənsɔː/, /ɑːrˈkænzəs/, and had several other pronunciation variants. In 1881, the Arkansas General Assembly passed the following concurrent resolution (Arkansas Statutes, Title 1, Chapter 4, Section 105):

Whereas, confusion of practice has arisen in the pronunciation of the name of our state and it is deemed important that the true pronunciation should be determined for use in oral official proceedings.

And, whereas, the matter has been thoroughly investigated by the State Historical Society and the Eclectic Society of Little Rock, which have agreed upon the correct pronunciation as derived from history, and the early usage of the American immigrants.

Be it therefore resolved by both houses of the General Assembly, that the only true pronunciation of the name of the state, in the opinion of this body, is that received by the French from the native Indians and committed to writing in the French word representing the sound. It should be pronounced in three (3) syllables, with the final "s" silent, the "a" in each syllable with the Italian sound, and the accent on the first and last syllables. The pronunciation with the accent on the second syllable with the sound of "a" in "man" and the sounding of the terminal "s" is an innovation to be discouraged.

Residents of Kansas often pronounce the Arkansas River as /ɑːrˈkænzəs ˈrɪvər/ in a manner similar to the common pronunciation of the name of their state.

== History ==
The first official use of the name Arkansas came in 1806 when the southern portion of New Madrid County in Louisiana Territory was designated as the District of Arkansas. In 1813, it became Arkansas County in Missouri Territory. When Missouri applied for statehood, it requested a southern boundary at 36º30′, except for a small section between the St. Francis River and the Mississippi River, where it extended south to 36º. This line later became the northern boundary of the Arkansas Territory.

On March 2, 1819, at the penultimate meeting of the 15th United States Congress, Congress passed the Arkansas organic act (3 Stat. L. 493), providing for the creation of the Arkansaw Territory on July 4, 1819, from the portion of the Missouri Territory lying south of a point on the Mississippi River at 36 degrees north latitude running west to the St. Francis River, then following the river to 36 degrees 30 minutes north latitude, then west to the territorial boundary. This included all of the present state of Oklahoma south of the parallel 36°30' north. The westernmost portion of the territory was removed on November 15, 1824, and a second westernmost portion was removed on May 6, 1828, reducing the territory to the extent of the present state of Arkansas.

Originally the western border of Missouri was intended to go due south to the Red River. During negotiations with the Choctaw in 1820, however, Andrew Jackson unknowingly ceded more of Arkansas Territory. Then in 1824, after further negotiations, the Choctaw agreed to move farther west, but only by "100 paces" of the garrison on Belle Point. This resulted in the bend in the common border at Fort Smith.

The territory originally had nine counties: Arkansas, Clark, Crawford (which included Lovely's Purchase), Hempstead, Independence, Lawrence, Miller, Phillips, and Pulaskị.

== Demographics ==
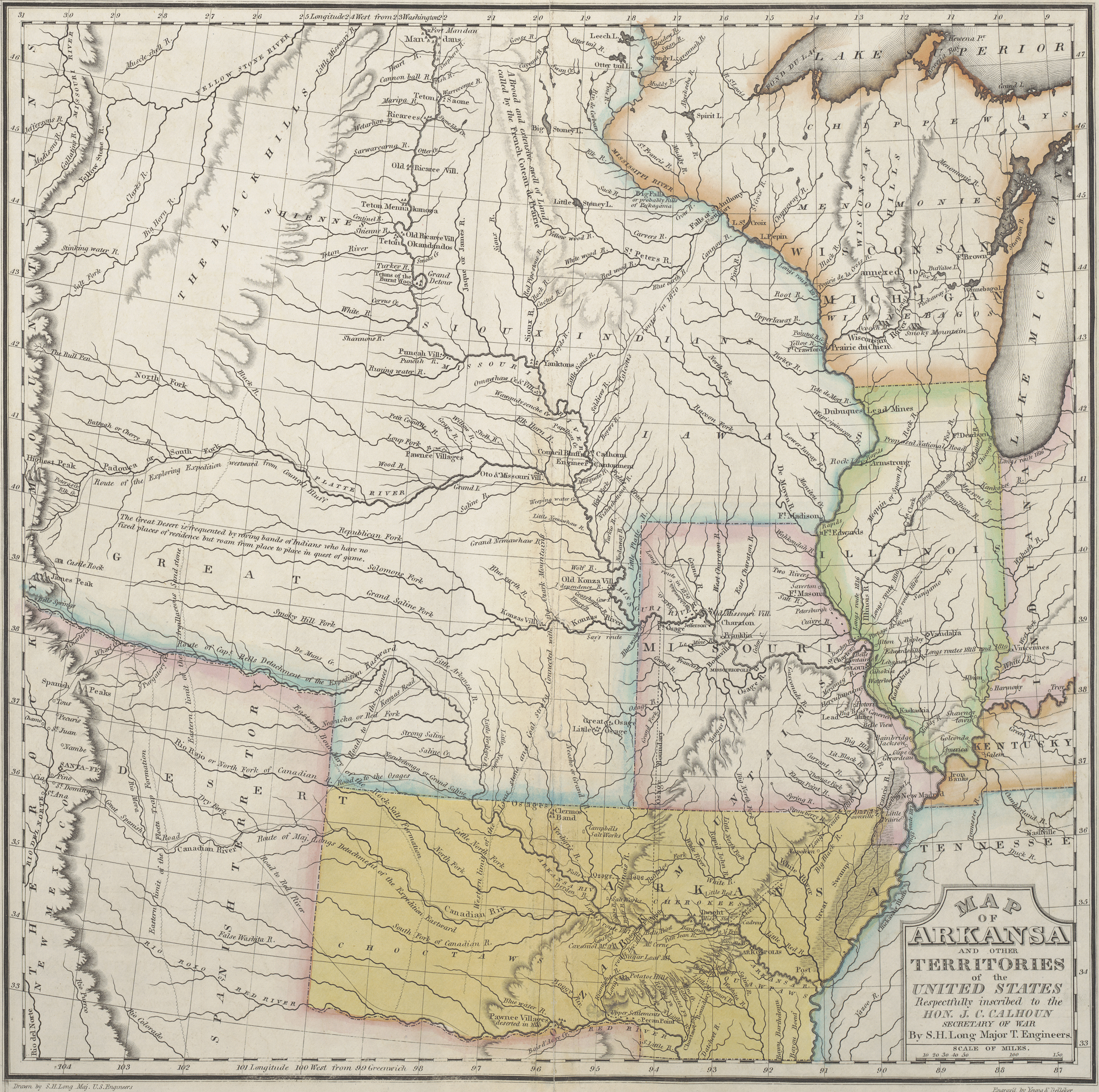
Geographical, Statistical and Historical Map of Arkansas Territory, after Stephen Harriman Long, 1822

In the 1830 United States census, 23 counties in the Arkansas Territory reported the following population counts (after only 7 reported the following counts in the 1820 United States census):

These census counts did not include Native Americans, and the earlier count includes 1,617 slaves. Though a census of Cherokee was to be taken as part of the Jackson and McMinn Treaty in 1818, it was never conducted. Instead, when the treaty was renegotiated in 1819, it used John C. Calhoun's estimate of 5000 Cherokee in Arkansas, despite the Cherokee Nation's estimate of 3,500. The Quapaw were counted at 455 in the mid 1820s.

1830 Rank	County	1820 Population	1830 Population
1	Lawrence	5,602	2,806
2	Hempstead	2,248	2,512
3	Crawford	–	2,440
4	Pulaski	1,923	2,395
5	Washington	–	2,182
6	Independence	–	2,031
7	St. Francis	–	1,505
8	Pope	–	1,483
9	Arkansas	1,260	1,426
10	Clark	1,040	1,369
11	Crittenden	–	1,272
12	Izard	–	1,266
13	Chicot	–	1,165
14	Phillips	1,201	1,152
15	Conway	–	982
16	Jefferson	–	772
17	Lafayette	–	748
18	Union	–	640
19	Sevier	–	634
20	Monroe	–	461
21	Hot Spring	–	458
22	Miller	999	356
23	Jackson	–	333
	Arkansas Territory	14,273	30,388

== Law and government ==
Robert Crittenden was the territorial secretary until 1829 and the de facto territorial governor, preparing Arkansas for statehood. Until present-day Oklahoma received statehood, Fort Smith served as the ostensible legal authority overseeing the Indian Territory. The Army oversaw issues dealing with the Indian Nations.

== See also ==
- Adams–Onís Treaty
- Arkansas Territorial Militia
- Territorial evolution of the United States

Preceded by Southern part of the Territory of Missouri; 1812–1819	Arkansas Territory; 1819–1836	Succeeded by State of Arkansas; 1836–present Unorganized Territory; 1824–1907
