= History of Arkansas =

The history of Arkansas began millennia ago when humans first crossed into North America. Many tribes used Arkansas as their hunting lands but the main tribe was the Quapaw, who settled in the Arkansas River delta upon moving south from Illinois. Early French explorers gave the territory its name, a corruption of Akansea, which is a phonetic spelling from the Illinois language word for the Quapaw. This phonetic heritage explains why "Arkansas" is pronounced so differently than the U.S. state of "Kansas" even though they share the same spelling.

What began as a rough wilderness inhabited by trappers and hunters became incorporated into the United States as part of the Louisiana Purchase in 1803 and later became the Arkansas Territory from 1819 to 1836. Upon gaining statehood on June 15, 1836, Arkansas had begun to prosper under a plantation economy that was heavily reliant on slave labor. After the American Civil War (1861–1865), Arkansas was a poor rural state, whose main economic base revolved around agriculture based chiefly on cotton production. In the late 19th century, the state instituted various Jim Crow laws to disenfranchise and segregate the African American population. This would last until federal legislation was passed in the 1960s. During the civil rights movement of the 1950s and 1960s, Arkansas and particularly Little Rock, were major battlegrounds for efforts to integrate schools.

The state started to see some economic prosperity during and after World War II in the 1940s. Arkansas became the base for retail corporation Walmart during the 1960s, which is headquartered in Bentonville. Walmart would later become the world's largest company by revenue. During the 20th century, different Arkansas political leaders would become nationally prominent, including the 42nd U.S. President Bill Clinton, who was Governor of Arkansas, 1979–1981 and 1983–1992.

== Early Arkansas ==
=== Paleo and Archaic periods ===
Beginning around 11,700 B.C.E., the first indigenous people inhabited the area now known as Arkansas after crossing today's Bering Strait, formerly Beringia. The first people in modern-day Arkansas likely hunted woolly mammoths by running them off cliffs or using Clovis points, and began to fish as major rivers began to thaw towards the end of the last great ice age. Around 9500 BCE, forests also started to expand, enabling local peoples to engage in greater gathering. Crude containers became a necessity for storing gathered items. Since mammoths had become extinct, hunting bison and deer became more common. These early peoples of Arkansas likely lived in base camps and departed on hunting trips for months at a time.

=== Woodland and Mississippi periods ===
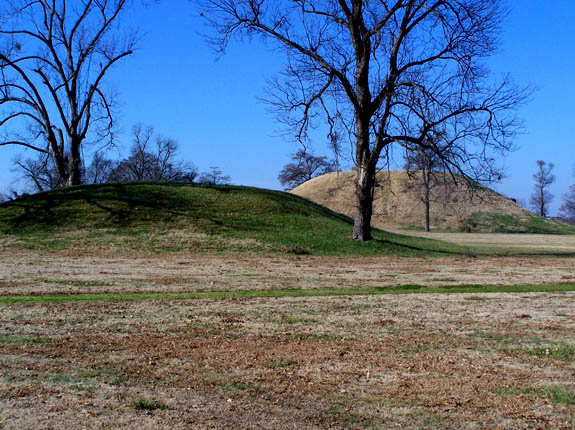
Toltec Mounds Site near Scott

Further warming led to the beginnings of agriculture in Arkansas around 650 BCE. Fields consisted of clearings, and Native Americans would begin to form villages around the plot of trees they had cleared. Shelters became more permanent and pottery became more complex. Burial mounds, surviving today in places such as Parkin Archeological State Park and Toltec Mounds Archaeological State Park, became common in northeast Arkansas. This reliance on agriculture marks an entrance into Mississippian culture around 950 CE. Wars began occurring between chieftains over land disputes. Platform mounds gain popularity in some cultures.

The Native American nations that lived in Arkansas prior to the westward movement of peoples from the East were the Quapaw, Caddo, and Osage Nations. While moving westward, the Five Civilized Tribes inhabited Arkansas during its territorial period.

== European colonization ==
=== The expeditions of De Soto, Marquette and Joliet ===
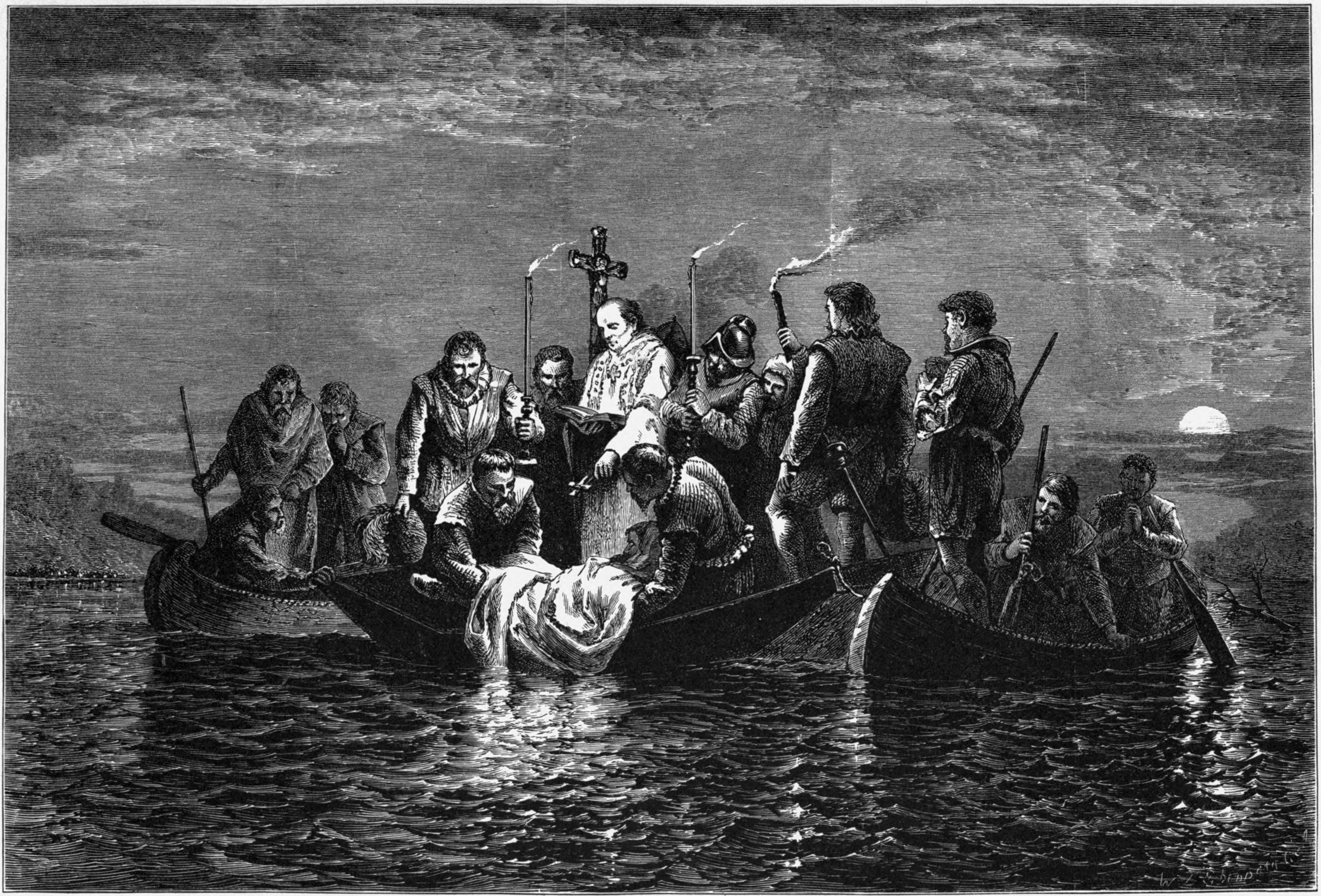
A drawing of the burial of De Soto

The first European contact with Arkansas was the Spanish expedition led by Hernando de Soto in 1541. De Soto wandered among settlements, inquiring about gold and other valuable natural resources. He encountered the Casqui in northeast Arkansas, who sent him north around Devil's Elbow to the Pacaha, the traditional enemies of the Casqui. Upon arrival in the Pacaha village, the Casqui who had followed behind de Soto attacked and raided the village. De Soto ultimately engaged the two tribes' chiefs in a peace treaty before continuing on across central Arkansas and into the Ozark Mountains in his search for riches. After finding nothing he considered of value and encountering native resistance the entire way; he and his soldiers returned to the Mississippi River where de Soto fell ill. He died the following day in what is believed to be the vicinity of modern-day McArthur in May 1542. Soto's body was weighted down with sand and he was consigned to a watery grave in the Mississippi River under cover of darkness.

De Soto had attempted to deceive the native population into thinking he was an immortal deity, sun of the sun, to forestall attack by outraged Native Americans on his by then weakened and bedraggled army. To keep the ruse up, his men informed the locals that de Soto had ascended into the sky. His will at the time of his death listed: "four Indian slaves, three horses and 700 hogs" which were auctioned off to his men. His starving men, who had been living off maize stolen from Native Americans and who had not been allowed to eat the enormous herd of hogs but had had to care for them, immediately started to butcher them. Later on his remaining men, now commanded by his aide de camp Moscoso, attempted an overland return to Mexico. They made it as far as Texas before running into territory too dry for maize farming and too thinly populated to sustain themselves by stealing food from the locals. The expedition promptly backtracked to Arkansas. After building a small fleet of boats they then headed down the Mississippi River and eventually on to Mexico by water.

In 1673, French explorers Jacques Marquette and Louis Jolliet reached the Arkansas River on an expedition to map the Mississippi River. After a calumet with friendly Quapaw, the group suspected the Spanish to be nearby and returned north.

=== French Louisiana ===
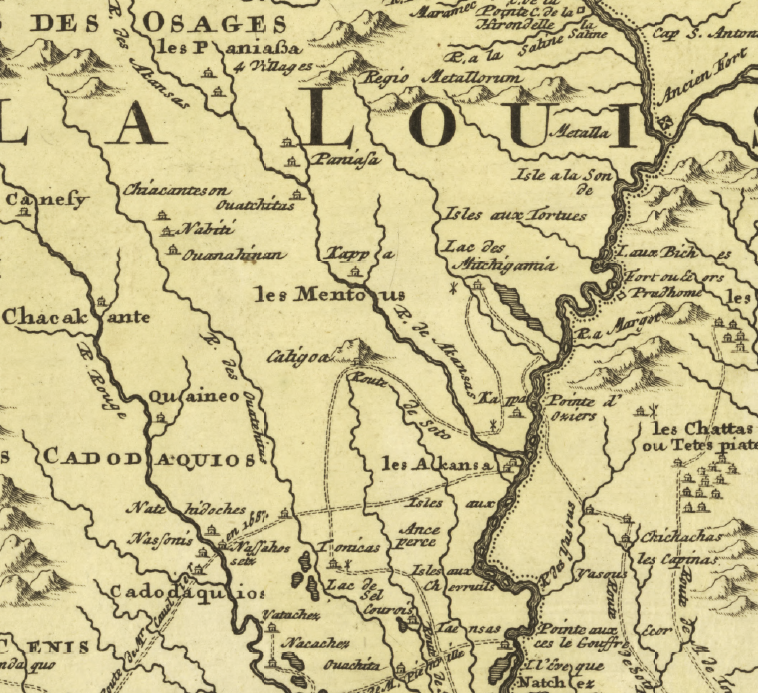
A map of the region in Louisiana, 1687

Robert La Salle entered Arkansas in 1681 as part of his quest to find the mouth of the Mississippi River, and thus claim the entire river for New France. La Salle and his partner, Henri de Tonti, succeeded in this venture, claiming the river in April 1682. La Salle would return to France while dispatching de Tonti to wait for him and hold Fort St. Louis. On the king's orders, La Salle returned to colonize the Gulf of Mexico for the French, but ran aground in Matagorda Bay. La Salle led three expeditions on foot searching for the Mississippi River, but his third party mutinied near Navasota, Texas, in 1687. de Tonti learned of La Salle's Texas expeditions and traveled south in an effort to locate him along the Mississippi River. Along with this journey south, de Tonti founded Arkansas Post as a waypoint for his searches in 1686. La Salle's party, now led by his brother, stumbled upon the Post and were greeted kindly by Quapaw with fond memories of La Salle. The troupe thought it best to lie and say La Salle remained at his new coastal colony.

The French colonization of the Mississippi Valley would end with the later destruction of Fort St. Louis were it not for de Tonti establishing the small trading stop, Arkansas Post. The party originally led by La Salle would depart the Post and continue north to Montreal, where interest was spurred in explorers who had the knowledge that the French had a holding in the region.

=== The first settlement: Arkansas Post ===
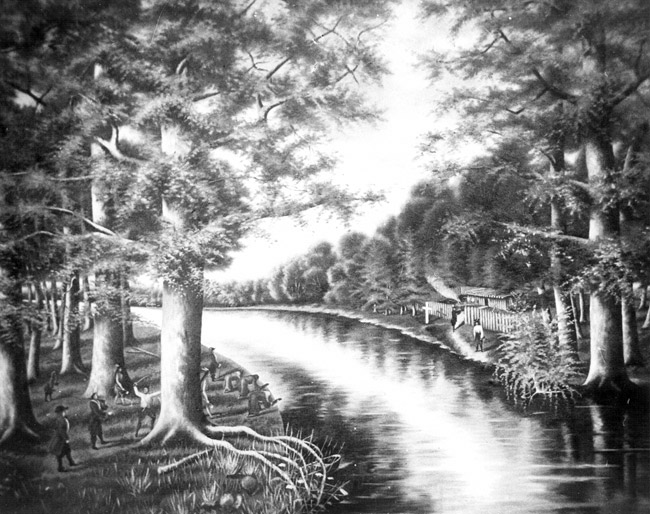
Annie Hatley, Depiction of Arkansas Post in 1689, Arkansas State Archives, 1904

The first successful European settlement, "Poste de Arkansea", was established by Henri de Tonti in 1686 on the Arkansas River. The post disbanded for unknown reasons in 1699 but was reestablished in 1721 in the same location. Sited slightly upriver from the confluence of the Arkansas River and Mississippi River, the remote post was a center of trade and home base for fur trappers in the region to trade their wares. The French settlers mingled and in some cases even intermarried with Quapaw natives, sharing a dislike of English and Chickasaw, who were allies at the time. A moratorium on furs imposed by Canada severely affected the post's economy, and many settlers began to move out of the Mississippi River Valley. Scottish banker John Law saw the struggling post and attempted to entice settlers to emigrate from Germany to start an agriculture settlement at Arkansas Post, but his efforts failed when Law-created Mississippi Bubble burst in 1720.

The French maintained the post throughout this time mostly due to its strategic significance along the Mississippi River. The post was moved back further from the Mississippi River in 1749 after the English with their Chickasaw allies attacked, it was moved downriver in 1756 to be closer to a Qua-paw defensive line that had been established, and to serve, as a repent, or trading post, during the Seven Years' War and prevent attacks from the Spanish along the Mississippi.

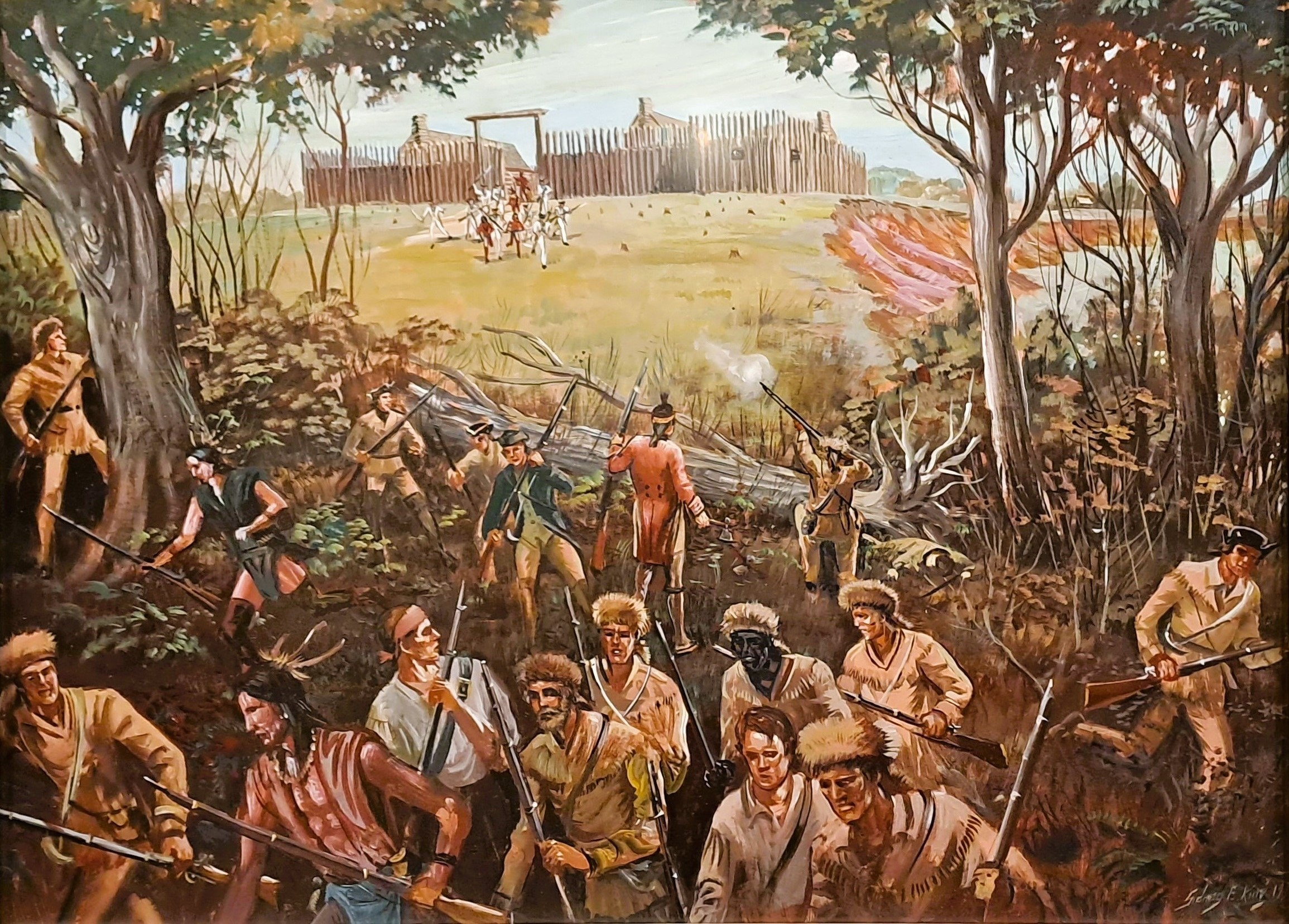
Colbert's raid on Arkansas Post in 1783

In 1762, the secret treaty of Fontainebleau transferred control of colonial Louisiana (including present-day Arkansas), to Spain in exchange for Florida. The Spanish showed little interest in Arkansas except for the land grants meant to inspire settlement around the post. Afterward, the post was again moved upriver out of the floodplain in 1779. Its position 4 miles (6.4 km) up the Arkansas River made it a hub for trappers to start their journeys, although it also served as a diplomatic center for relations between the Spanish and Quapaw. Many that stopped at Arkansas Post were simply passing through on their way up or down river and needed supplies or rest. Habitants included approximately ten merchants, some domestic slaves, and the wives and children of voyageurs. A small detachment of the Louisiana Fixed Infantry Regiment lived inside the fort, tasked with protecting the village of Arkansas Post nearby. On April 17, 1783, present-day Arkansas experienced its only battle of the American Revolutionary War when Captain James Colbert of the 16th Regiment of Foot led a force of British partisans and Chickasaws against the Spanish village and fort.

== Road to statehood ==
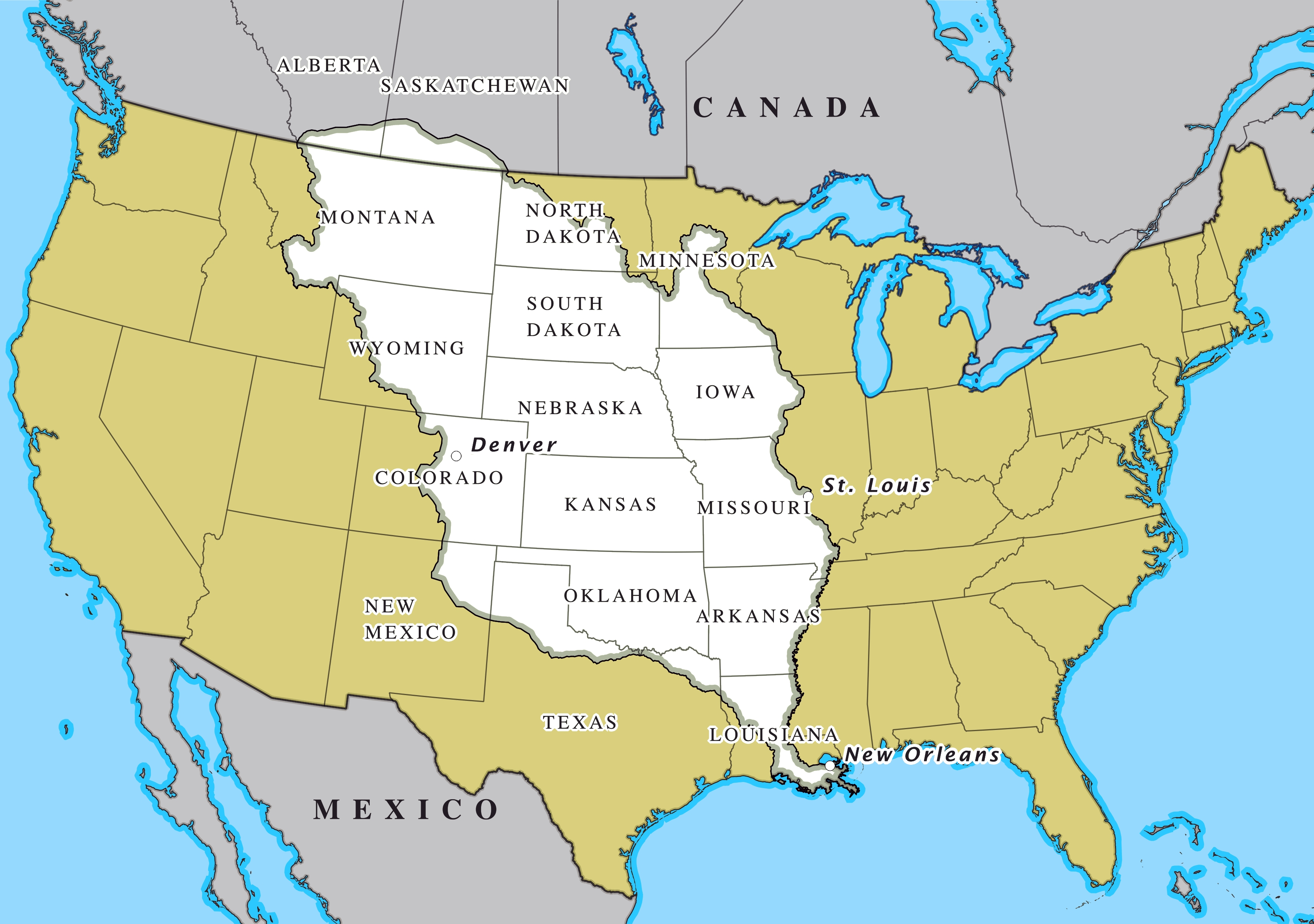
The United States, with the Louisiana Purchase overlaid

Although the United States of America had gained separation from the British as a result of the Revolutionary War, Arkansas remained in Spanish hands after the conflict. Americans began moving west to Kentucky and Tennessee, and the United States wanted to guarantee these people that the Spanish possession of the Mississippi River would not disrupt commerce. Napoleon Bonaparte's conquest of Spain shortly after the American Revolution forced the Spanish to cede Louisiana, including Arkansas, to the French via the Third Treaty of San Ildefonso in 1800. England declared war on France in 1803, and Napoleon sold his land in the new world to the United States, today known as the Louisiana Purchase. The size of the country doubled with the purchase, and a stream of new White settlers led to a changed dynamic between Native Americans and Arkansans. Prior to the Louisiana Purchase, the relationship between the two groups was a "middle ground" of give and take. These relationships would deteriorate all across the frontier, including in Arkansas.

Thomas Jefferson initiated the Lewis and Clark Expedition to find the nation's new northern boundary, and the Dunbar Hunter Expedition, led by William Dunbar, was sent to establish the new southern boundary. The group was intended to explore the Red River, but due to Spanish hostility settled on a tour up the Ouachita River to explore the hot springs in central Arkansas. Leaving in October 1804 and parting company at Fort Miro on January 16, 1805, their reports included detailed accounts of give and take between Native Americans and trappers, detailed flora and fauna descriptions, and a chemical analysis of the "healing waters" of the hot springs. Useful information for settlers to navigate the area and descriptions of the people inhabiting south Arkansas was also included.

The settler-Native American relationship deteriorated further following the 1812 New Madrid earthquake, viewed by some as punishment for accepting and assimilating into White culture. Many Cherokee left their farms and moved shortly after a speech in June 1812 by a tribal chief admonishing the tribe for departing from tradition.

=== Political integration and autonomy ===
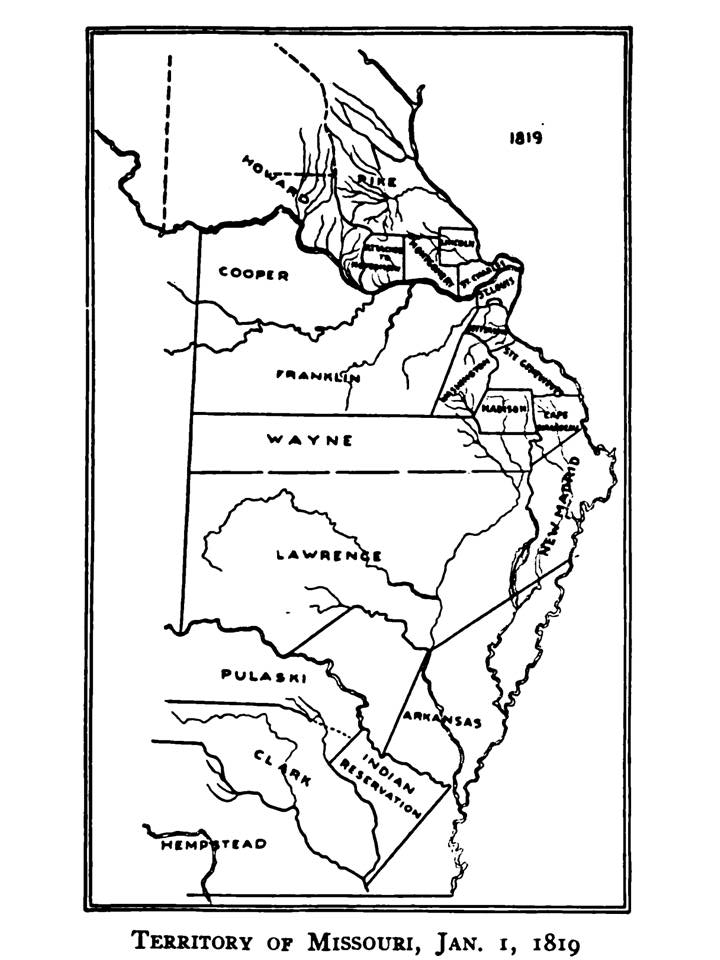
Map of Missouri before statehood, 1819

A small segment of the Territory of Missouri applied for statehood on March 2, 1819. The application included a provision that would bring Missouri into the Union as a slave state, which would upset the delicate balance of slave and free states. This application also defined all land in the Missouri Territory south of the parallel 36°30' north, except the Missouri Bootheel between the Mississippi River and the Saint Francis River north of the 36th parallel north, as the new Territory of Arkansaw. When the Missouri Enabling Act was taken up in the United States House of Representatives, James Tallmadge denounced slavery and succeeded in passing the Tallmadge Amendment in the House, an act that would have extinguished slavery in Missouri in a generation. The act was the first attempt to curb the rapid expansion of slavery along the country's expanding western frontier and caught many southern Democrats by surprise. The following day, John Taylor proposed identical restrictions on slavery before authorizing the Arkansaw Enabling Act. The banning of new slaves amendment was soundly defeated, but the gradual emancipation measure was tied until Speaker of the House Henry Clay cast the deciding no vote killing the Amendment and allowing Arkansas to organize as a slave territory. The Missouri Compromise was later struck allowing Maine to enter as a free state, thus allowing Missouri to enter as a slave state to keeping the balance of free/slave states at 12 each.

The uncertainty surrounding Missouri's status as a slave state caused a rapid out-migration of slaveholders into Arkansas. Slavery also became a divisive issue within Arkansas. The wealthy planters of southeast Arkansas strongly supported slavery since manual labor was the only method of harvesting cotton at the time. The northwest parts of the state did not have cotton plantations, and as little as 2% of the black population in northwest Arkansas was enslaved during the territorial era. However, northwest Arkansas backed slavery in support of the southeastern Arkansas planters.

Different aspects of frontier life are preserved today in three state parks. Historic Washington State Park in southwest Arkansas is a restored town that was formerly a bustling stop on the Southwest Trail. Davidsonville Historic State Park preserves one of early Arkansas's most important communities, including Arkansas's first post office and courthouse. Powhatan Historic State Park on the Black River allows visitors to relive a former riverport town during its heyday.

=== U.S. territory ===
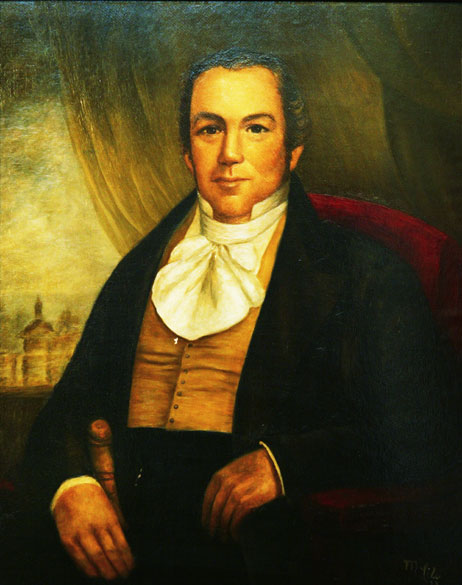
James Miller

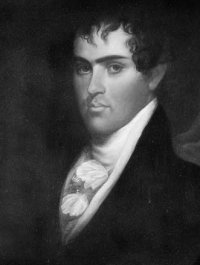
Robert Crittenden

The new Arkansas Territory held its territorial government at the territorial capital, Arkansas Post, and included all of present-day Arkansas and Oklahoma except the Oklahoma panhandle. These lands became Indian Territory by 1828, leaving the modern day outline of Arkansas. Upon creation of the territory, President James Monroe appointed James Miller of New Hampshire, the hero of Lundy's Lane, as territorial governor, and young Robert Crittenden as secretary of the territory. Miller had little interest in governing the territory, and spent most of his time outside its boundaries. This left an opportunist Crittenden in charge of Arkansas, and he quickly assembled three judges together to form Arkansas's first legislature. Crittenden also held an election that selected James Woodson Bates as Arkansas's territorial delegate to Congress in addition to forming and filling the two branches of the General Assembly of Arkansas Territory. This election became contested when Miller returned and decided Arkansas would follow an 1812 law that all territorial legislative positions were to be filled by appointment, nullifying Crittenden's election. Congress later affirmed the election, but the situation formed a divide between Miller's followers and the Crittenden faction.

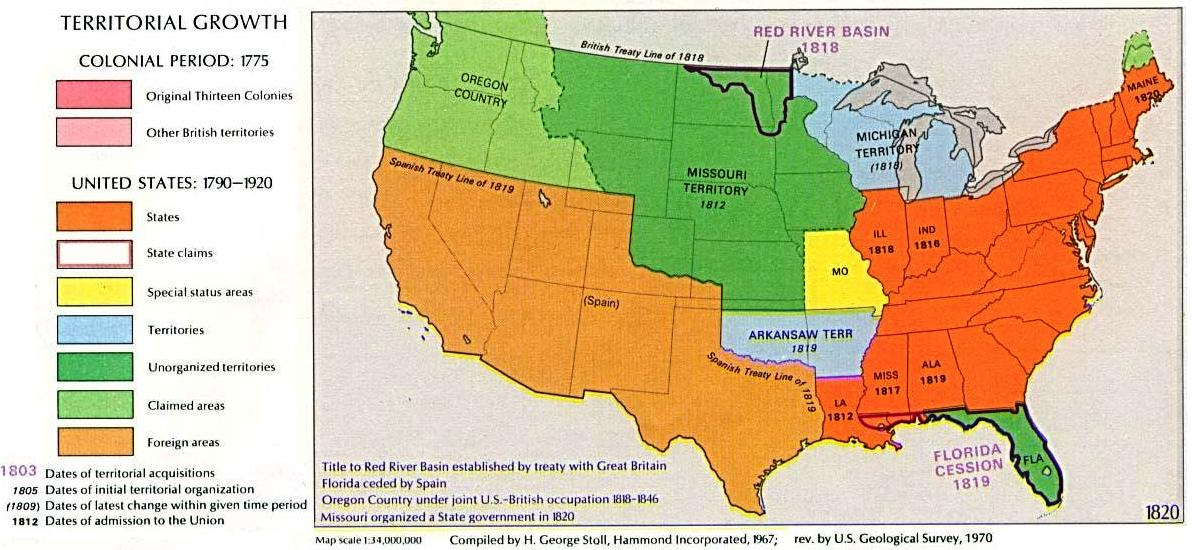
Map of the United States showing Arkansaw Territory, 1820

Miller and Crittenden were again divided over the relocation of the territorial capitol from the unsuitable backwater at Arkansas Post. The legislature discussed the issue of relocating the capitol in 1820, but could not decide between Little Rock and Cadron before the session ended. After the session ended, William Russell, owner of hundreds of lots around Little Rock, began selling them to legislators and influential men like Crittenden, Robert Oden, William A. Trimble, and Andrew Scott. Upon returning, the legislature passed a bill to move the capitol to Little Rock by three votes, increasing the value of many legislators' Little Rock lots significantly. In protest, Miller moved to a new house at Crystal Hill near Cadron before being reassigned to Salem, Massachusetts. During the move to Little Rock, Crittenden formed the Rose Law Firm with Chester Ashley, forming a powerful political alliance between The Family and Crittenden's supporters. Arkansas's second territorial governor was George Izard, a wealthy planter who moved to the territory from South Carolina. Izard succeeded in changing divorce law and briefly stopping the Quapaw removal in Arkansas. He also organized a militia and managed to quiet Crittenden, who remained as secretary of the territory. Izard died in 1828 and was replaced by John Pope, who was appointed by Andrew Jackson.

=== Indian removal ===
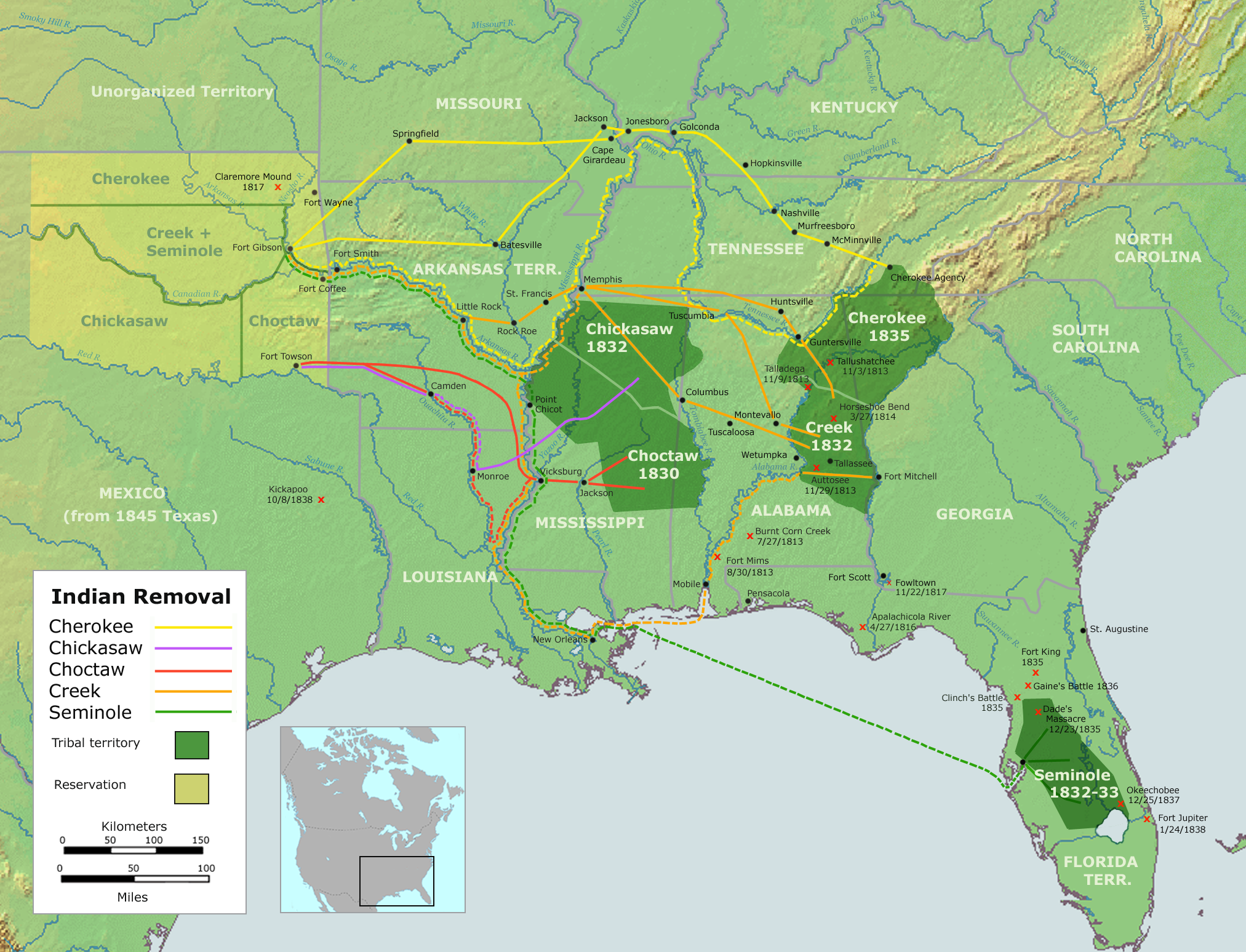
The Indian Removal Act resulted in the transplantation of several Native American tribes and the Trail of Tears.

In an effort to prevent white settlers taking over their territory, the Quapaw signed an 1818 treaty relinquishing all their hunting lands in exchange for keeping 32,000,000 acres (13,000,000 ha) of land along the Arkansas River in south Arkansas in their possession. This treaty was later reneged upon the following year, with whites taking all but 1,000,000 acres (400,000 ha) back for settlement. At this time, Cherokee from Georgia, South Carolina, and North Carolina were being forced into Arkansas onto Caddo hunting lands west of Little Rock. The Caddo did not welcome the invasion of the Cherokee, who had thought they were moving to uninhabited land. The Caddo viewed the Cherokee as "domesticated" by the white man for signing treaties with the United States government and the tribes went to war. Cephas Washburn established Dwight Mission near Russellville as a school for Cherokee youth at the tribe's request in 1822. This school was later moved to Sallisaw, Oklahoma. The Osage signed a treaty to leave Arkansas in 1825 and moved to Kansas briefly before buying their own reservation in Osage County, Oklahoma. The United States established Fort Smith and Fort Gibson, Oklahoma, to keep the peace and trade with the Native Americans.

During the Industrial Revolution, cotton prices boomed and white settlers clamored for the fertile lands around the Arkansas River inhabited by the Quapaw. Eventually the government forced the Quapaw to a reservation in Louisiana with the Caddo. Frenchman Antoine Barraqué led the Quapaw south in the winter of 1825–26. They found the Caddo inhospitable because the Quapaw were viewed as invaders and when the Quapaw's crop washed away twice due to flooding of the Red River, conditions got even worse. Combined with the overcrowding and lack of annuities promised to both tribes, the Quapaw were unhappy and followed Saracen back to their homeland along the Arkansas River. By 1830, the entire tribe had returned to Arkansas, and despite Governor Pope and Indian agent Richard Hannon, the Quapaw were removed to a separate reservation in northeast Oklahoma in 1833. Secretary Robert Crittenden was instrumental in acquiring the final removal.

=== Increasing demand for slave labor ===
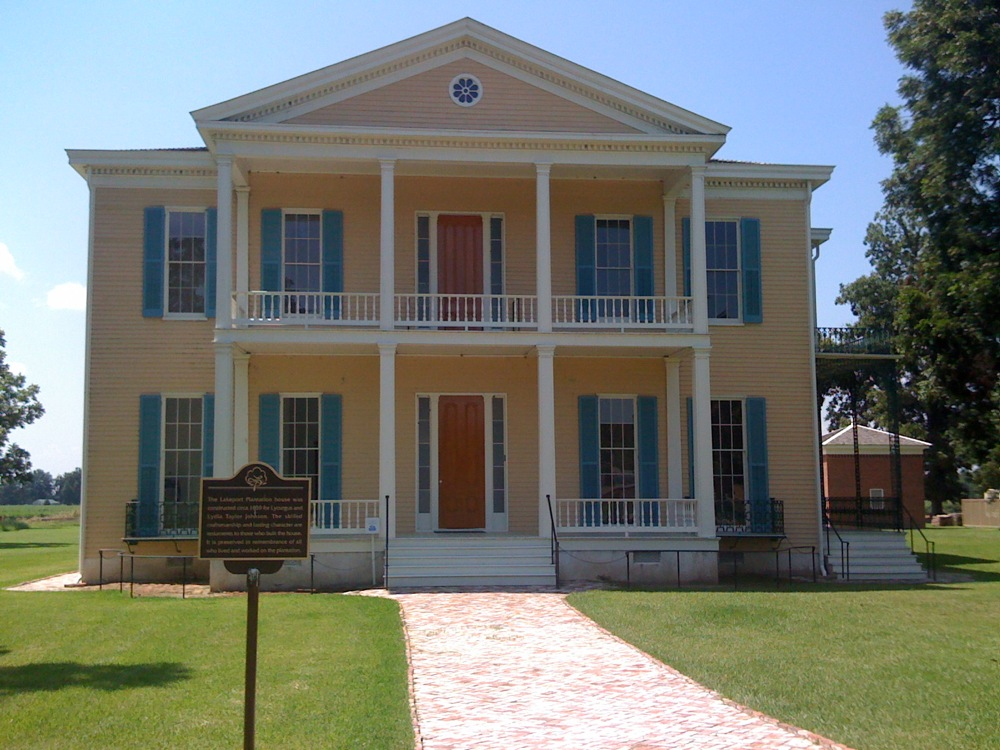
Lakeport Plantation, built c. 1859

Many slaves were brought to Arkansas by planters looking to cash in on the Arkansas Delta's fertile lands. The most capable male slaves were often separated from their families and relocated to the swamps of southeast Arkansas. These swamplands were poorly drained, and many planters required their slaves to work long hours clearing trees from the swamps by hand. Slaves were forced to live in cramped slave quarters in the densely forested swamps, surrounded by disease-carrying mosquitoes. Conditions were brutal; slaves often received only one pair of clothes per year, given on Christmas by the planter family. Diets consisted of only fatback and cornmeal, usually lacking in vegetables and other necessities to stave off deficiencies.

Enslaved people employed a range of strategies to cope with and resist the conditions of slavery. Some traveled at night to meet with enslaved people on neighboring plantations. While these gatherings were often clandestine, in certain cases plantation owners permitted them. Enslaved laborers also engaged in everyday forms of resistance, including deliberately slowing their work, damaging tools, feigning illness, pretending not to understand instructions, or temporarily running away. In some instances, enslaved people stole food or clothing, committed arson, or used poisoning to disrupt plantation operations. Religious gatherings among enslaved communities frequently emphasized biblical themes such as Moses and the Exodus. Family formation represented a significant form of social resistance. Although marriages between enslaved people were not legally recognized, informal unions were often acknowledged by plantation owners, who believed that family ties reduced the likelihood of rebellion. At the same time, planters used threats of separation or punishment against family members as a means of enforcing control. Relationships occurred both between enslaved people on different plantations and, in some cases, between enslaved individuals and their owners. While these relationships could provide emotional support and stability, they also enabled slaveholders to exert greater control, thereby reinforcing and perpetuating the institution of slavery.

=== Pioneer women ===
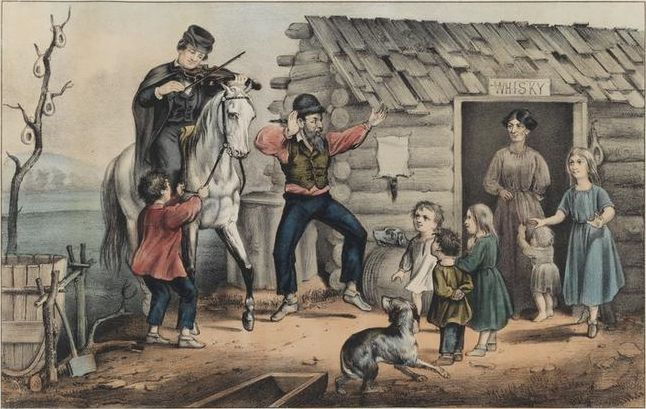
The Turning of the Tune: Traveller Playing the "Arkansas Traveller", lithograph by Currier and Ives, 1870

Although the Victorian ideals of men and women maintaining different spheres of influence still held strong in communities, the system broke down on the frontier when survival took priority over the social contract. Women were often tasked with maintaining the property's day-to-day operations while their husbands were away conducting business. This included dealing with slave overseers or the farm's labor itself. This break from Victorian principles often went unacknowledged by frontier men and women, however.

Many women founded the first marks of civilization in their areas, including schools and churches. Women often met with other women at church and had many superficial friendships to repel loneliness. Health care on the frontier was the responsibility for women, as very few doctors were available. If an entire household fell ill, a neighboring woman was responsible for nursing them back to health. Childbirth also weighed on women as a risky proposition that often resulted in the death of the mother. As a result, the process was feared, dreaded, and often went unmentioned in diaries from the period. The pressures of childbirth, being the primary health care provider and chief farm operator upon their husband's departure gave many frontier women anxiety.

== Early years of the state ==
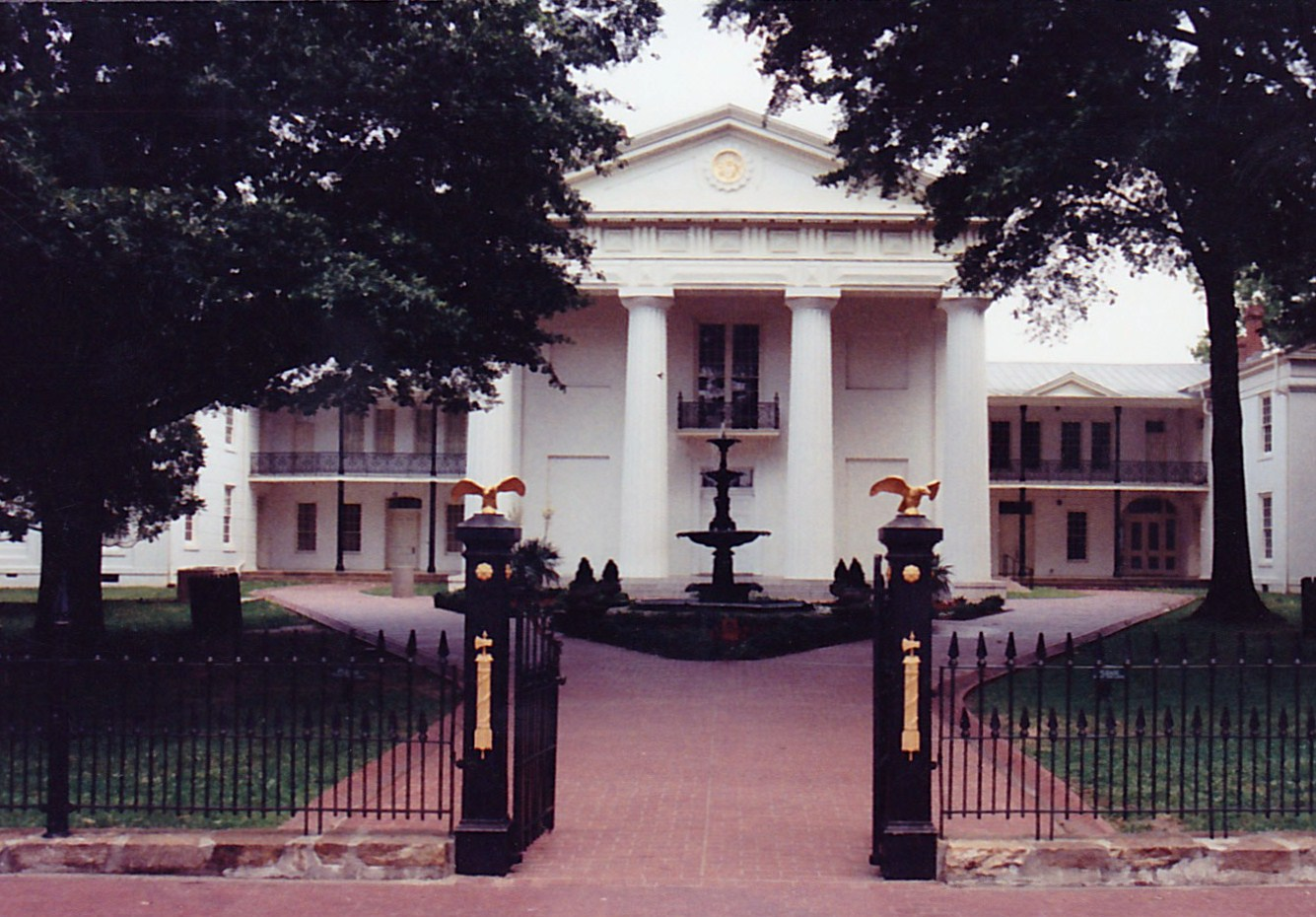
Arkansas State House, Little Rock.

The question of statehood was first raised by National Republican Benjamin Desha in 1831 in the Little Rock Arkansas Advocate. This position was contrary to the Democrats and The Family, who feared that the taxation required to maintain state government would be onerous on the state's meager population. Arkansas's territorial delegate and Family member Ambrose Sevier shared this concern about high taxes; however his inability to vote with Andrew Jackson to oppose the Whigs, the National Bank and other various economic policies eventually made him more amenable to statehood.

When it was announced that Michigan would be applying for statehood as a free state, Sevier knew the abolitionists would have a numerical advantage in the U.S. Senate unless Arkansas also entered as a slave state as a result of the Missouri Compromise. Both states applied for statehood, and both were initially denied by congressional Whigs because they were Democratic strongholds. Arkansas and Michigan both began to draw up state constitutions despite the ruling.

Almost immediately, sectionalism came to the forefront when drafting the constitution, and discussion primarily centered on the issue of representation. Tempers flared between delegates from southeast Arkansas, who proposed representation include a three-fifths rule to count the numerous slaves held in the region. Upland delegates, despite being led by slaveholder David Walker, wanted to proportion the congressional districts based on only free white men, which would give that region a political advantage. Eventually a geographic compromise was struck, with districts in Arkansas Senate from the northwest, eight from the southeast, and one from a central district. The compromise codified political balance between the two sections of Arkansas, negating the lowland's wealth advantage and the upland's free white population advantage. After this compromise, the Arkansas Constitution was drafted and sent to Washington for approval. After a 25-hour session in the House over the slavery issue, the Arkansas Constitution was approved. President Andrew Jackson approved the bill creating the State of Arkansas on June 15, 1836.

Statehood did not immediately spur settlement or development of the former territory. Arkansas was described as an "enduring frontier"; population lagged neighboring states and was half as populous as sister state Michigan upon admittance. Factors slowing development of frontier Arkansas during early statehood included a remote location, poor roads, Native Americans hostile to encroachment, and the swamplands in eastern Arkansas that migrants from points east encountered shortly after crossing the Mississippi River. Migration through 1850 was predominantly from four nearby states: Tennessee, Alabama, Missouri and Mississippi accounting for a total of 74% of white family migration. These settlers generally eschewed the lowlands of east Arkansas for the uplands of the Ozarks and Ouachitas, seeking familiar topography and climate to establish small subsistence farms on prairies and wooded hills, as well as in the Arkansas River Valley. The two distinctive societies that had taken hold by statehood continued to grow separately during the early statehood period, but both retained a frontier experience well into the 19th century, largely immune from technology and forces of development that overtook other frontier states after 1815.

=== Banking crisis ===
Arkansas's economy was in poor shape in the period leading up to statehood and was not in a position to support state government functions. Tax rates were very low in all Southern states controlled by planters, and Arkansas was no exception. Most planters did not carry a lot of cash and were usually indebted to cotton factories most months of the year. The little extra cash planters had was usually invested in slaves or land, leaving most plantations in the margins for long periods of time. The northwest parts of Arkansas that did not rely on cotton production relied on a cash scarce economy that consisted of bartering for necessities. Although farmers produced enough goods to sell, they were locked into the local market and were unable to transport their goods to other markets, keeping the region cash-poor. The Federal government gave land to the state, to be sold for seed money to start a treasury for Arkansas. These funds were quickly wasted, and since frontier Arkansas did not offer many services to its citizens, revenues from taxes and fees were incapable of supporting the state government. President Jackson's Specie Circular also hurt the state economy by forcing land purchases to be made with gold and silver rather than paper money. In addition to affecting private citizens who were land speculating, the policy stymied state revenues since Arkansas had been relying on the tax revenue from each land purchase as its primary source of income.

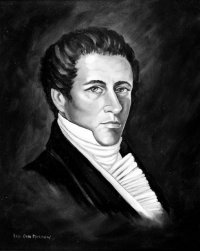
James Conway

Arkansas considered selling bonds to raise funds, but the frontier state remained an unknown and was not seen as a safe investment. The state also lacked agencies capable of issuing bonds, until Governor James Conway signed acts which chartered two banks during Arkansas's first legislative session, a State Bank and a Real Estate Bank. This system had contemporaries in many other states. The Real Estate Bank was to be privately owned by shareholders, but too few shareholders bought in, causing the state to fund both banks. A showdown on the state legislature floor ended with knives being drawn. President of the Real Estate Bank/Speaker of the Arkansas House John Wilson killed state legislator Joseph Anthony after Anthony offered a bill that criticized Wilson's management of the Real Estate Bank. Wilson was acquitted of murder but expelled from the legislature. Wilson was reelected in 1840, and later had to be restrained in another knife fight.

In 1836, Arkansas was to be the recipient of funds from the Deposit and Distribution Act, rumored by some to be as much as $1 million ($29.32 million in today's dollars). A very important sources of seed money for the State Bank; the program encountered a harsh recession that limited its effectiveness. Treasurer William Woodruff had trouble cashing the first two installments of $45,583.83 and $50,000 ($1,336,000 and $1,466,000 today) at the two banks in Natchez, Mississippi, due to a bank run. Since the deposits were going to a state bank, the cash-strapped banks couldn't simply borrow the money from the state of Arkansas. Woodruff traveled to Washington, D.C., where he received replacement drafts on Louisiana, Kentucky, and Ohio banks from United States Treasurer John Campbell, but encountered the same troubles in those states.

The problems Woodruff was encountering would become known as the Panic of 1837, a recession that took many years to recover from. Arkansas would only receive $45,583.83 of federal money, the amount of the first check which was ultimately settled by the Natchez banks. While Woodruff was trying to acquire the Distribution Act funds, the Arkansas State Banks had opened in Arkansas Post, Batesville, Fayetteville, Little Rock, and Washington and had been loaning money based on the notes given to Woodruff from various other states. Further, the bonds issued by the banks were not selling as anticipated, leaving the institutions without much of their anticipated seed money. Both banks would fail within a decade, with the bonds they had issued becoming entangled in legally questionable deals. Eventually the bonds fell into the hands of London banker James Holford, and they would come to be known as the "Holford Bonds", valued at $1,239,526.82 ($46.124 million today) in 1858. The issue of whether or not the bonds were a legitimate state debt and whether or not they would be repaid would be a political issue in the state throughout the 1800s.

=== Mexican War ===
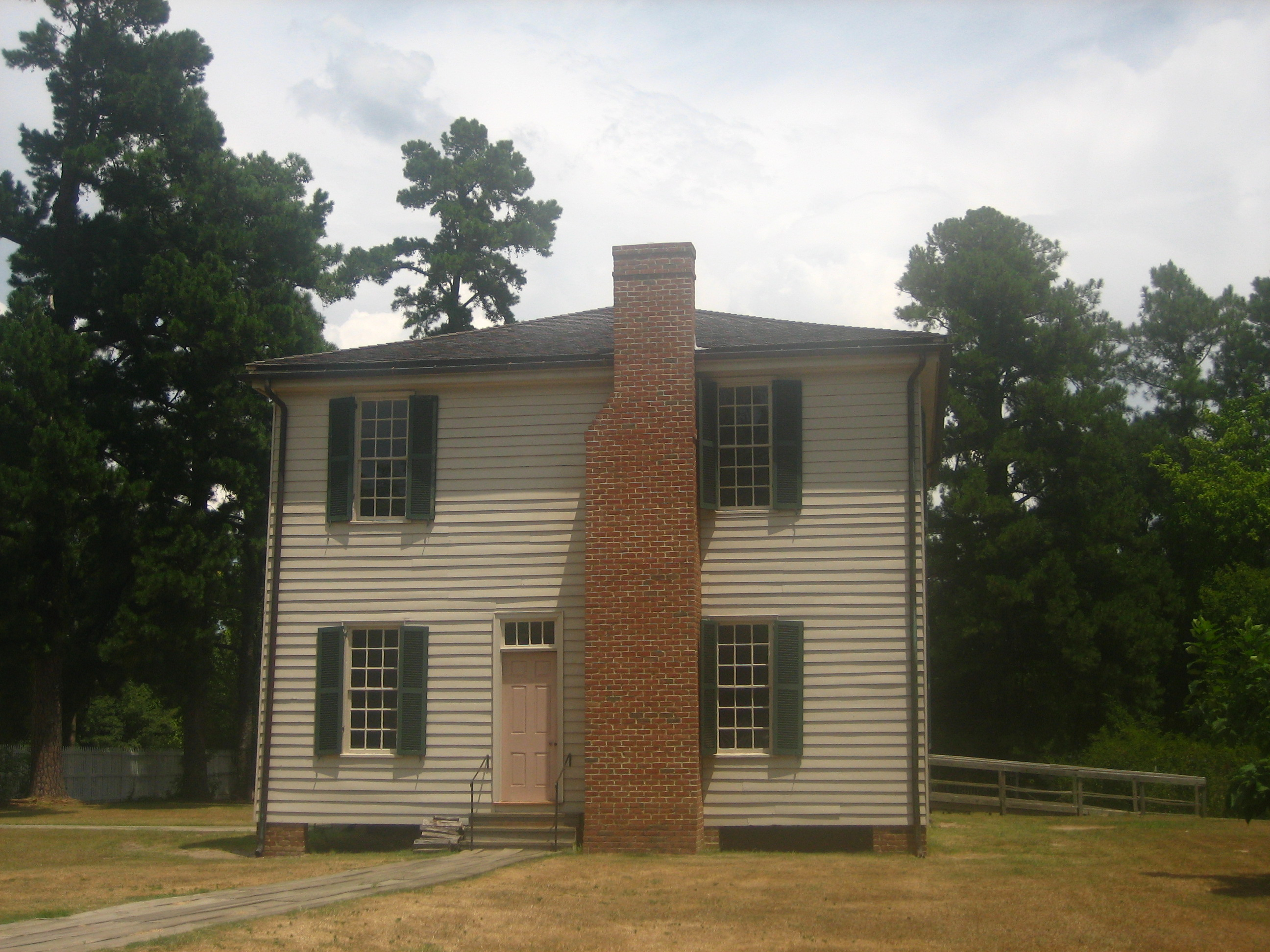
Hempstead Court House

Arkansas played a key role in aiding Texas in its war for independence with Mexico, sending troops and materials to Texas to help fight the war. The proximity of the city of Washington to the Texas border involved the town in the Texas Revolution of 1835–36. Some evidence suggests Sam Houston and his compatriots planned the revolt in a tavern at Washington in 1834. When the fighting began a stream of volunteers from Arkansas and the eastern states flowed through the town toward the Texas battlefields.

When the Mexican–American War began in 1846, Washington became a rendezvous for volunteer troops. Governor Thomas Drew issued a proclamation calling on the state to furnish one regiment of cavalry and one battalion of infantry to join the United States Army. Ten companies of troops assembled here where they were formed into the first Regiment of Arkansas Cavalry.

=== Late antebellum period ===
The young state began to show its first signs of improving beyond a frontier wilderness in the 1850s. The growing need for cotton gave many Arkansans an avenue to become involved in market economy for the first time, a transition that made the state significantly more prosperous. At the time, the most efficient way to grow cotton was a plantation-style system, and this quickly became the norm in the southeast part of Arkansas. During the late antebellum period, most Arkansans were identified with farming and ranching. Fewer worked as carpenters, blacksmiths, gunsmiths, and wagon builders and fewer still as lawyers, doctors, and teachers. This economic shift also allowed some Arkansans to work outside the factory or field as artisans, including James Black who is credited with creating the first Bowie Knife in Arkansas during the period. Improving transportation also helped the state's economy grow. The Southwest Trail and Butterfield Overland Mail were major roads in the state, and steamboats began using the state's rivers for commerce. Arkansas increased its cotton production from 6,000,000 pounds (2,700,000 kg) in 1840 to 26,000,000 pounds (12,000,000 kg) in 1850. Arkansas and the southeast grew rapidly due to cotton, but its use of the plantation system would ultimately set the state and region behind the rest of the nation for decades. Southeast Arkansas became significantly more prosperous than the northwestern highlands, causing a rift to form between the two regions.

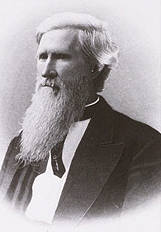
Henry Rector

Although the slave issue had been tabled following the Missouri Compromise, it again came to the forefront when California's admission to the Union threatened the political balance between free and slave states. John Roane, William Sebastian, Solon Borland, and Robert Johnson began rallying support for the Southern cause in Arkansas, including discussing secession. However, most Arkansans were looking to compromise and preserve the Union. After the Compromise of 1850, several Family members in favor of secession acquired political office, including Elias Conway as governor. Thomas Hindman, a lawyer from Helena and strong supporter of Southern rights (i.e. slavery), acquired the congressional seat in Arkansas's northern district with the support of the Family. Hindman would later side with Henry Rector against the Family, and both were successful in 1860. During this time, the nation was continuing to grapple with the slavery issue. The Dred Scott v. Sandford decision and John Brown's raid on Harpers Ferry kept slavery in the news. The creation of a Republican party who wanted to restrict the spread of slavery gave abolitionists a new option at the polls.

Abraham Lincoln was elected president in 1860 when Rector became the first governor from outside the Family. Although Arkansans were leery of Lincoln, they were unsure of Rector's position with regard to secession. Hindman, Johnson, and Edward W. Gantt continued to advocate the pro-slavery cause along with those loyal to the Family. South Carolina voted to secede in December 1860, and Hindman called for a secession vote, a move backed by Rector. The governor also forced the surrender of the garrison in Little Rock after rumors of Lincoln reinforcing the outfit. A vote in February 1861 showed Arkansas in favor of a state convention to decide the issue of secession, but the delegates voted to remain in the Union. Although the vote was close, it favored the Union, mirroring the demographics of Arkansas at the time. Northwest Arkansas was mostly pro-Union and had a slight population majority, and the southeast primarily in favor of secession.

Following President Lincoln's call for volunteers to quell the Southern rebellion following the bombardment of Fort Sumter on April 4, 1861, Rector ordered the state militia to take control of Fort Smith from the Federal government. Secession was again put to a vote at the state convention on May 6. Given the recent events, less than 10% of the delegates voted to remain in the Union. Chairman David Walker requested another vote in the interest of obtaining a unanimous decision. Only Isaac Murphy cast a ballot against secession for the second vote, officially ending Arkansas's membership in the Union.

== Civil War and Reconstruction ==
=== Secession and Civil War ===
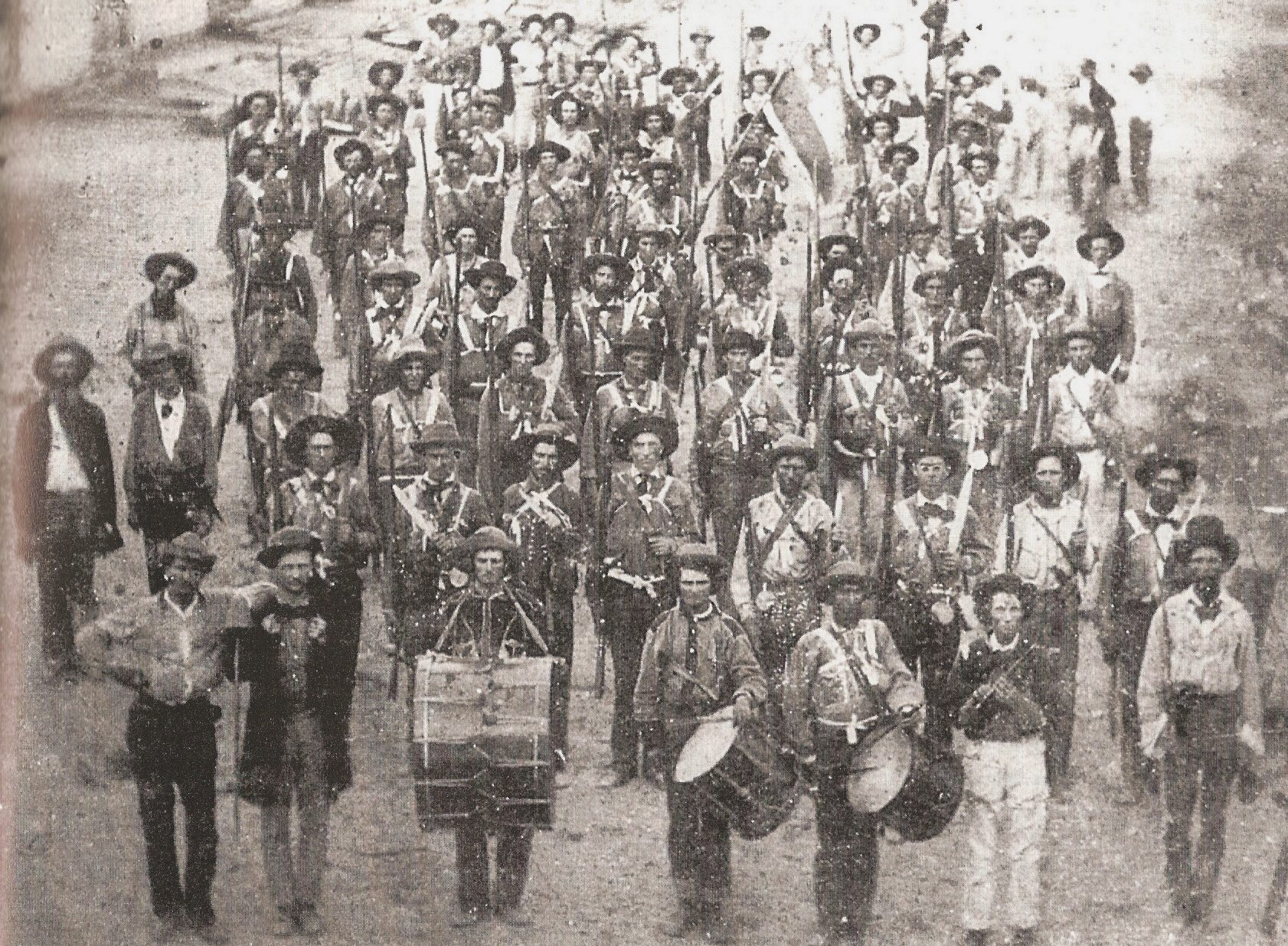
Mustering in the "Hempstead Rifles," Arkansas Volunteers, at Arkadelphia, Arkansas, in 1861.

Support for the Confederate cause was immediate following secession. Many towns sent soldiers with hunting rifles to Little Rock. People across the state thought victory over the Union Army would come swiftly. Some anti-war organizations formed in northwest Arkansas, such as Arkansas Peace Society, but members of these groups were arrested and charged with treason or forced to join the Confederate Army. Geographically Arkansas was an important state during the Arkansas Civil War, giving the Confederate government control of the Mississippi River and tenuous holds on Missouri, Louisiana and Indian Territory to the west. Confederate Brigadier-General Benjamin McCulloch was ordered to defend northern Arkansas and Indian Territory; however he elected to lead his troops into Missouri in support of Missouri Major-General Sterling Price's state guard, leading to the Battle of Wilson's Creek near Springfield, Missouri. This bloody battle shocked many who had thought the war would be a quick victory for the Confederacy.

Once it became apparent to Arkansans and the new nation that the war would not be a quick and painless proposition, excitement began to temper. Unpopular Confederate conscription laws and high taxes became major political and social issues in addition to reports of tremendous loss of life at such far off places as Shiloh in April 1862. Casualties were high for both sides at this battle, as a result of advanced weapons technology, but also poor battlefield medicine. Both sides battled disease, poor nutrition, and transportation issues throughout the war.

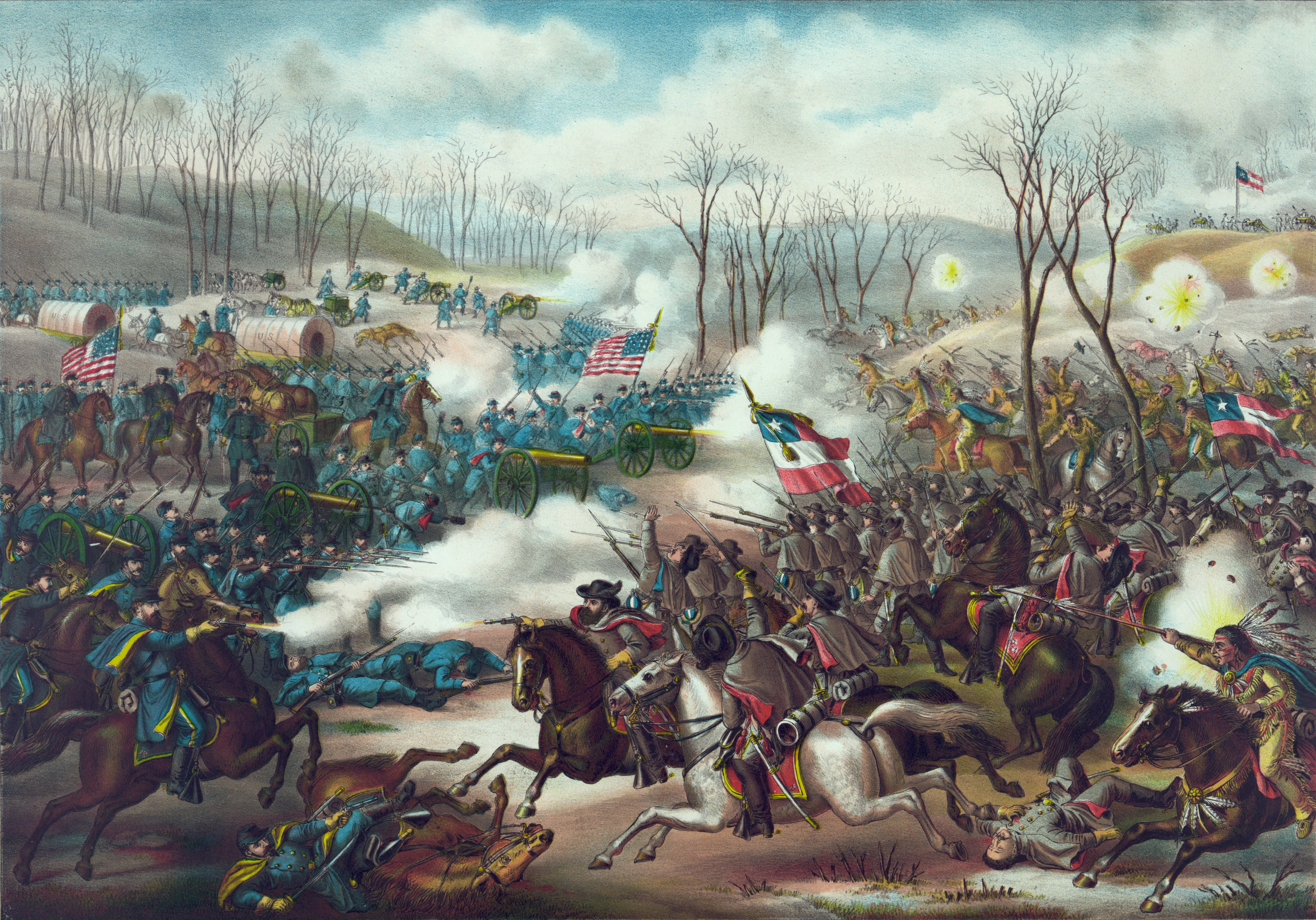
Battle of Pea Ridge in March 1862

The Union began an offensive across Arkansas in early 1862 in which Brigadier-General Samuel Curtis led troops near Leetown, where the Battle of Pea Ridge occurred. After securing a Union victory, Curtis swept across the state to Helena. He intended to knock Arkansas out of the war by capturing Little Rock until Confederate reinforcements arrived in Spring 1862 under Brigadier-General William Steele. Confederate Major-General Thomas Hindman, although recently defeated at the Battle of Cotton Plant, attempted to return northwest Arkansas to Confederate control. The Battle of Prairie Grove was essentially a stalemate, but Hindman's command withdrew to Van Buren and was driven from the region completely by December 1862. The Union Army defeated Confederate forces at the Battle of Fayetteville in April 1863, but a week later abandoned northwest Arkansas and retreated back into Missouri for the summer.

After Union Major-General Benjamin Butler decided to treat escaped slaves flocking to his lines as contraband of war, plantation owners began moving them away from Federal armies. Some planters moved to Brazil, including some Arkansans. Congress passed the Confiscation Act of 1862 that stated if their master was fighting for the South; a slave could gain freedom by crossing behind Union lines. Following the Union victory at Antietam, the Emancipation Proclamation defined the impetus of further fighting to be slavery. This kept the United Kingdom out of the war, who was rumored to be sympathetic to the Southern cause but did not want to be viewed as promoting slavery. Many slaves sought freedom in the North, but arrived only to work on plantations for meager wages since cotton was also critical to the Northern war effort.

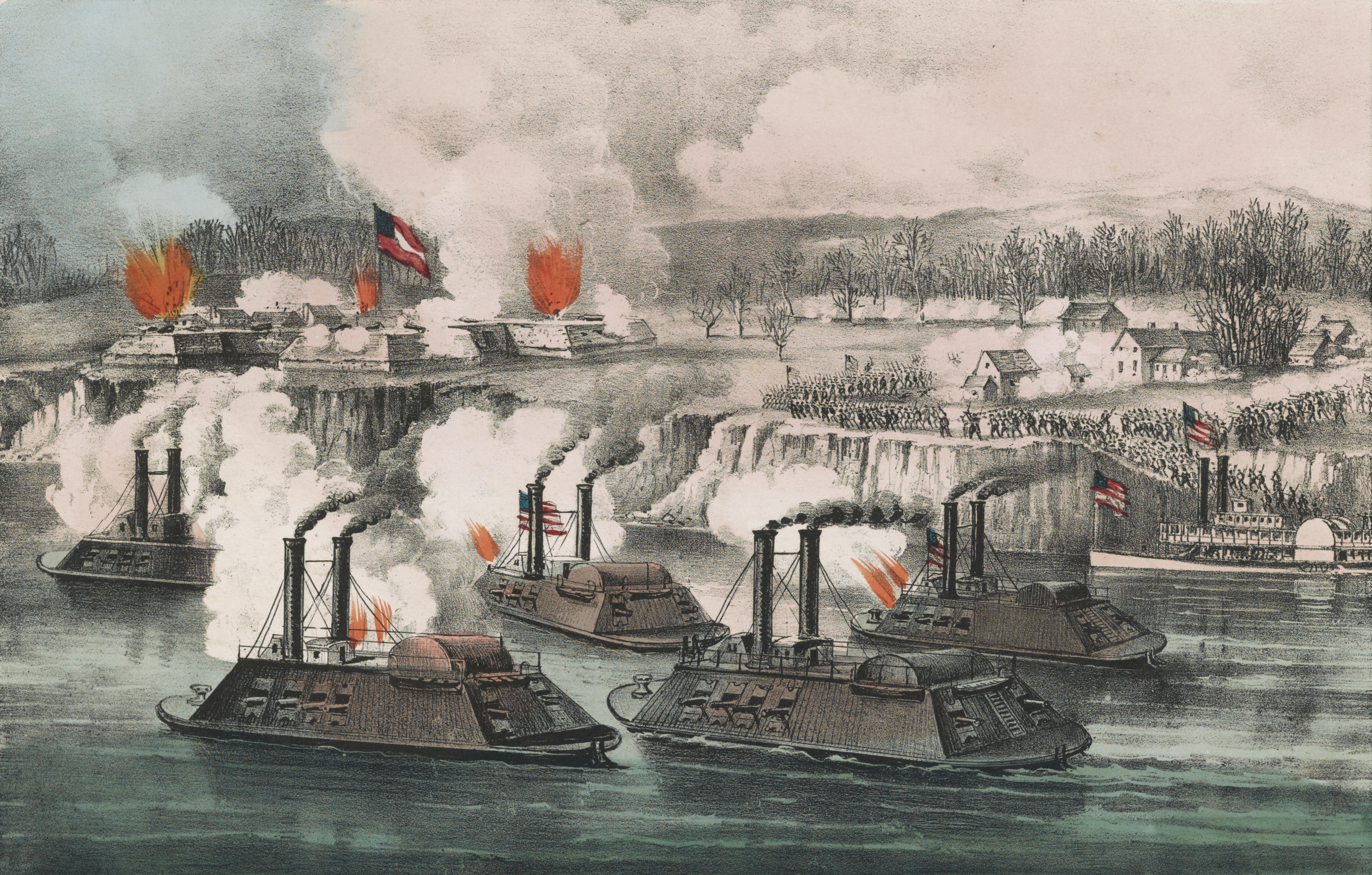
Bombardment and capture of Fort Hindman at Arkansas Post in 1863

The war began to turn against the Confederates in 1863, losing at the Battle of Helena despite a coordinated attack by generals Theophilus Holmes, Sterling Price, John Marmaduke, and James Fagan. The Siege of Vicksburg concluded as a Union victory the same day, severely compromising the Rebels' control of the Mississippi River. Later in the year the Union used the post at Helena to capture Little Rock, forcing the state government to relocate, with the state archives, to Washington. Despite controlling the state capital at Little Rock, the Union hold on the state was tenuous. Guerrilla warfare ravaged the countryside and small towns throughout the war. Bands of guerrillas often stole from houses and burned fields wherever the Union or Confederate forces were not present.

The last major fighting within the state occurred during the 1864 Camden Expedition. The expedition was a military campaign in south central Arkansas which involved Union forces stationed at Little Rock and Fort Smith under the command of Major-General Frederick Steele. The plan called for Steele's force to march to Shreveport, Louisiana, where it would link up with an amphibious expedition led by Major-General Nathaniel Banks and Rear-Admiral David Porter, whose force was to advance up the Red River Valley. Once joined, the Union force was to strike into Texas. But the two pincers never converged, and Steele's columns suffered terrible losses in a series of battles with Confederate forces led by Price and General Kirby Smith.

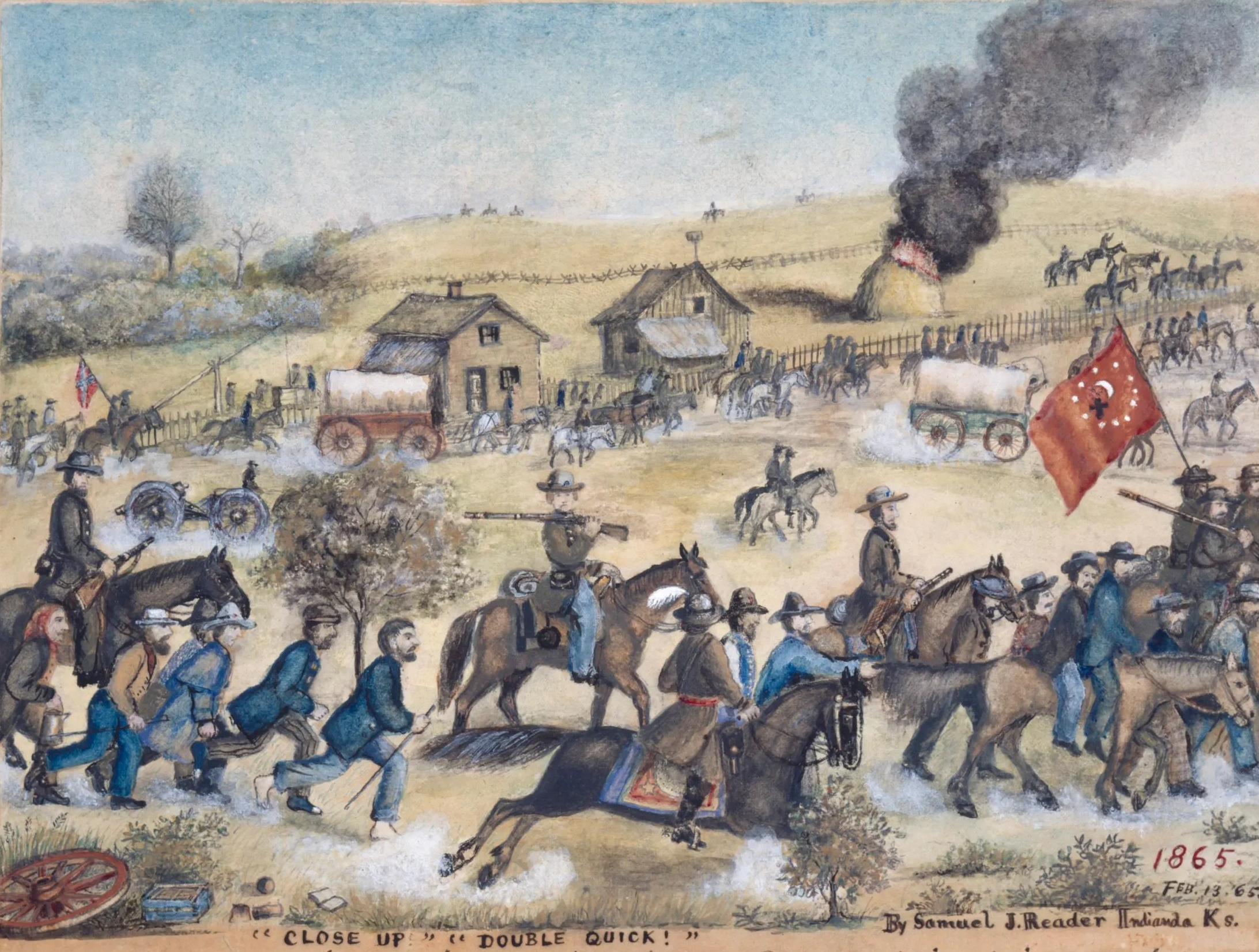
Price's Missouri Raid in the fall of 1864

The victory by Confederates in the Red River campaign and its Arkansas phase, the Camden Expedition, opened a brief window of opportunity for Arkansas Confederates. Missouri General Joseph Shelby was dispatched to northeast Arkansas with his cavalry brigade and began recruiting. Throughout the summer of 1864, Confederate strength in northeast Arkansas steadily grew with many soldiers who had either deserted from their previous commands or become separated, returning to Confederate Service. The last formation of new Confederate units occurred during this time with the formation of the 45th through the 48th Arkansas Mounted Infantry regiments. Several existing Arkansas units were converted to Mounted Infantry and dispatched to northeast Arkansas. Shelby was eventually able to seriously threaten vital Union lines of communication along the Arkansas River between Helena and Little Rock, and for a while it appeared that Confederates would mount a serious attempt to retake Little Rock. However, Confederate authorities in Richmond were pressuring Kirby Smith to dispatch some of his infantry to reinforce Confederate armies east of the Mississippi. This caused an uproar with the Arkansas regiments and as a compromise, Smith approved a plan by Sterling Price to organize a large-scale raid into Missouri that would coincide with the 1864 United States presidential election. Many Arkansas troops would participate in the last Confederate offensive operation in the Trans-Mississippi Department when Price lead a large cavalry raid into Missouri in the fall of 1864. Following his defeat at the Battle of Westport in on October 23, 1864, most of the Arkansas cavalry units returned to the state and were furloughed for the remainder of the war.

When the war ended, the Third Arkansas surrendered with Lee's Army of Northern Virginia at Appomattox, Virginia, on April 9, 1865. The remnants of Major-General Patrick Cleburne's division of Arkansas Troops surrendered with the remnants of the Army of Tennessee at Bennett Place near Durham Station, North Carolina, on April 26. The Jackson Light Artillery was among the last of the Confederate troops east of the Mississippi to surrender. The Jackson Light Artillery aided in the defense of Mobile and surrendered with the Department of Alabama, Mississippi, and East Louisiana. The battery spiked their guns and were paroled at Meridian, Mississippi, May 11.

Arkansas infantry regiments assigned to the Trans-Mississippi Department were all included in the formal surrender negotiations of that department on May 26, 1865. At the time, the infantry was encamped in and around Marshall, Texas, as war-ravaged Arkansas was no longer able to provide adequate sustenance to the army. The regiments were all ordered to report to Shreveport, Louisiana, to be paroled. In actuality, none of them did so. Some individual soldiers went to Shreveport on their own to be paroled, but the regiments simply disbanded without formally surrendering. Most Arkansas cavalry units were surrendered by Brigadier-General Jeff Thompson, commanding the Military Sub-District of Northeast Arkansas and Southeast Missouri. He agreed to surrender the command at Chalk Bluff on May 11, and to have his cavalrymen assemble at Wittsburg and Jacksonport to lay down their arms and receive their paroles. The command was formally surrendered and paroled at Wittsburg on May 25 or Jacksonport June 5. Smaller commands surrendered at various locations throughout May and June 1865, to include Fort Smith and the Union posts of Little Rock and Pine Bluff.

=== Reconstruction Period ===
Following the war, the Southern economy was in shambles, including Arkansas. The cost of the war effort, loss of human capital, and Confederate currency losing value were serious issues for the south in addition to the destruction of property, infrastructure, and crops. Emancipated blacks also rushed out of the south following the war. Abraham Lincoln's moderate ten percent plan allowed the Confederate states to return once 10% of their 1860 voters pledged allegiance to the United States and emancipation. A constitutional convention elected Isaac Murphy provisional governor, the lone vote against secession in the 1861 convention. Confederate loyalists quickly labeled Murphy as a traitor and compromised his effectiveness. Arkansas's two senators Elisha Baxter and William Fishback were denied seating in Washington by the Radical Republicans who thought Lincoln's policies were too lenient. Confederate governor Harris Flanagin brought state documents back from Washington and retired after the war. The Arkansas Constitution was redrawn in 1864 with the provisions necessitated by the 10% plan. When Lincoln was assassinated on April 14, 1865, the hopes of a painless restoration of the Union died as well.

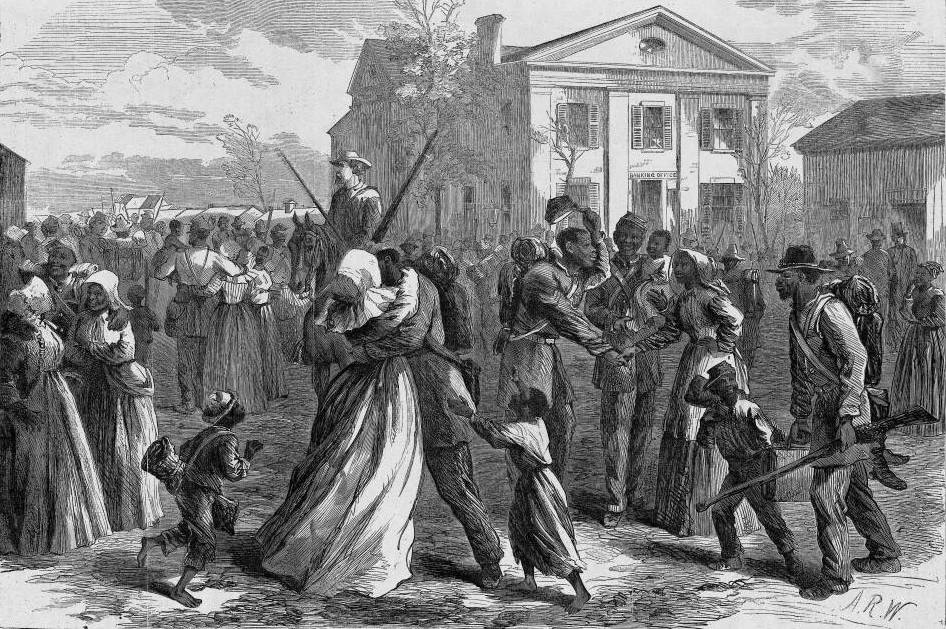
A drawing of U.S. Colored Troops mustered out at Little Rock, 1866.

The southeast Arkansas planters tried several avenues to maintain cotton production despite emancipation. The system of sharecropping eventually became most popular, allowing individuals to use farmland, seed, tools and a dwelling provided by the landowner. At season end he received a share of the crop (which in turn was used to pay off local merchants who had provided credit for living expenses.) The duty of supervising these contracts between newly freed slaves and planters was the responsibility of the federal Freedman's Bureau. Many plantation owners despised paying the same slaves that had run off from their plantation years earlier. Blacks began using their own schools and churches for the first time. Following the frustrations of losing the war and slavery, the Ku Klux Klan (KKK) became the military arm of the Democratic party in much of the south, including Arkansas. Tasked with keeping blacks as well as white Republicans on plantations and away from the polls, the KKK and other groups like the Bald Knobbers reigned terror throughout the state for years.

President Andrew Johnson granted pardons to many leading Confederates. The Confederate veterans in Arkansas formed a conservative political party to oppose the Unionists, lead at first by Augustus Garland. The strong anti-Unionist feelings in the state were evident when Arkansas voters refused to ratify the 14th amendment, guaranteeing citizenship, due process, and equal protection to freedmen, and in fact passed laws restricting freedmen. Once it became clear the South would not return to the Union easily, the Military Reconstruction Act was passed in 1867. Arkansas became a military territory under General Edward Ord.

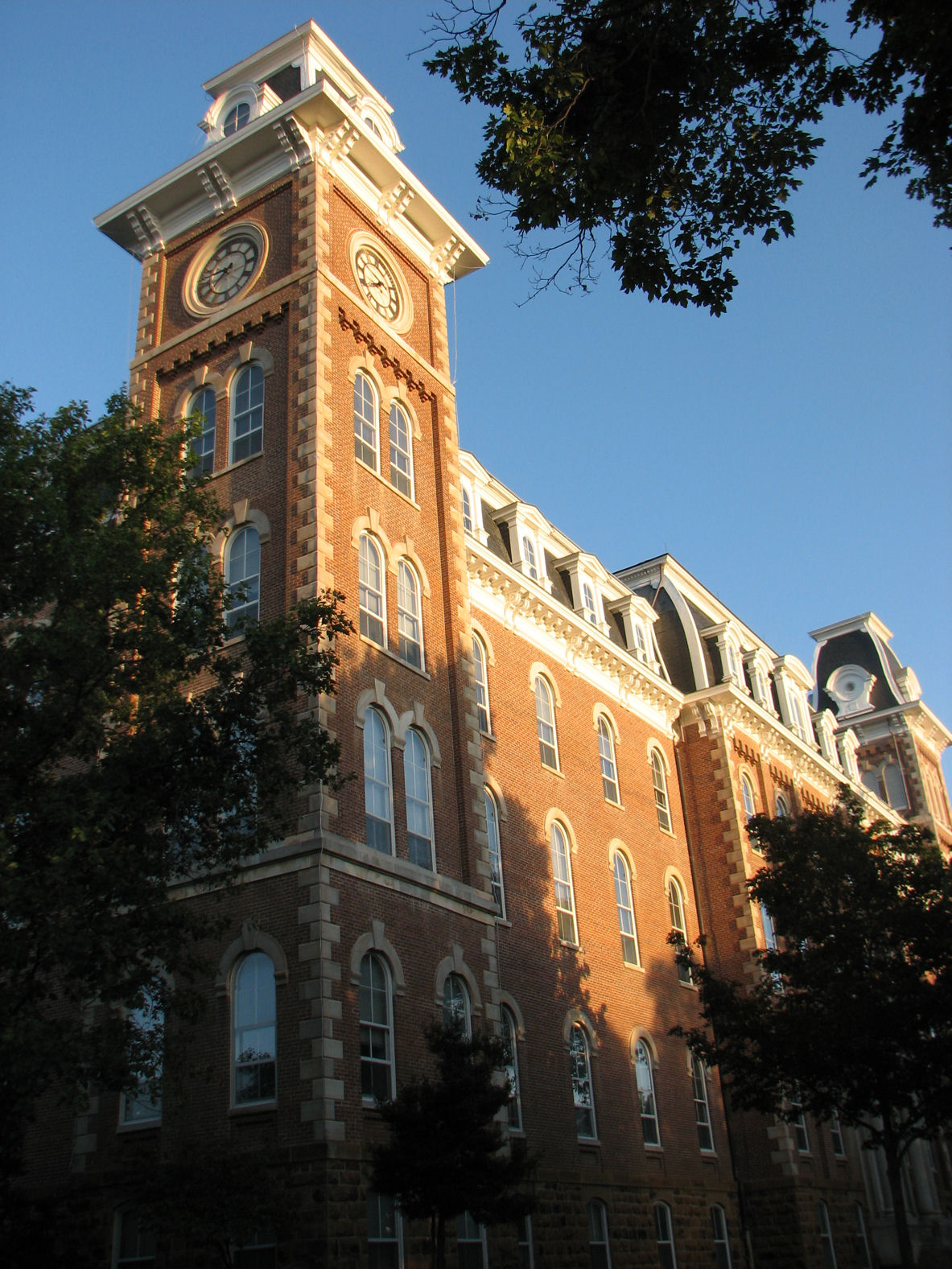
University of Arkansas, founded by the General Assembly in 1868, is one of many public universities in the state.

General Ord kept Governor Murphy in power but dissolved the state legislature. Republicans called a convention in Little Rock in April 1867 to discuss how Arkansas could return to the Union. Freedmen began to participate in politics through organizations such as the Union League, including registering blacks for the upcoming election. The election selected seventy delegates to a constitutional convention, composed primarily of Radical Republicans. The resulting constitution gave blacks full citizenship, due process, and the right to vote, as well as free public schools for all races and the establishment of the University of Arkansas. The document infuriated many conservatives and many thought it was a partisan document created for the benefit of the Republicans. The new constitution was approved in a corrupt election that also gave many offices to the Republicans. Ord certified the results, as did Congress over the president's veto, and the new Arkansas assembly ratified the 14th amendment, allowing Arkansas to reenter the Union on June 22, 1868.

Powell Clayton, a Union general who had returned to live in Arkansas after the war, was elected governor in the corrupt 1868 election. Clayton took it upon himself to keep former Confederate personnel out of power and protect the newly freed blacks. Many of his political appointments were from northern states, leading his opponents to paint him and his allies as carpetbaggers. To build Arkansas's infrastructure, Clayton raised taxes, another unpopular decision. Financial incentives were given to railroad companies, who ultimately laid 662 miles (1,065 km) of track by the end of Reconstruction with $9 million ($264 million in current dollars) in state assistance.

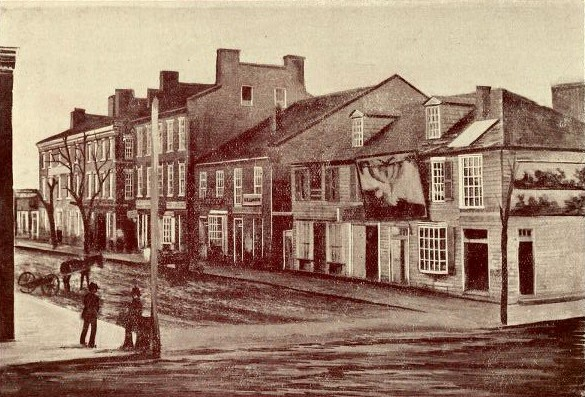
Anthony House – Scene of the 1874 conflict between Brooks and Baxter.

Following the 1868 election, many residents were frustrated by the radical Republicans that had taken control of most county offices. The KKK began whitecapping throughout Arkansas, and Governor Clayton declared martial law in ten counties, later adding four more. In Mississippi County, one of the martial law counties, a racially and politically charged event called the Black Hawk War took place in 1872 that is indicative of Reconstruction. County registrar Charles Fitzpatrick rode around with an armed group of blacks, collecting taxes and issuing threats to his opponents. Fitzpatrick accused Sheriff J. B. Murray of misappropriating county funds, and the allegation became a heated argument. When the two met to shake hands at the Osceola Post Office, Murray punched Fitzpatrick, who responded by shooting and killing Murray. Upon Fitzpatrick turning himself in, a trial was held but the judge adjourned the tense court for two days before ordering Fitzpatrick to disperse his company of 200 armed men. Fitzpatrick complied, and the judge went across town to disperse a crowd of KKK members, led by former Confederate Captain Charles Bowen. Both parties dispersed but ran into each other south of town and shots were fired. Fitzpatrick was never convicted and was nominated for the state legislature, but was defeated by Hiram McVeigh.

The 1872 gubernatorial election was also marked by fraud and corruption. In 1874, the Brooks-Baxter War shook Little Rock. The dispute about the legal governor of the state was settled when President Ulysses S. Grant ordered that Joseph Brooks to disperse his militant supporters.

== Gilded Age and the New South ==
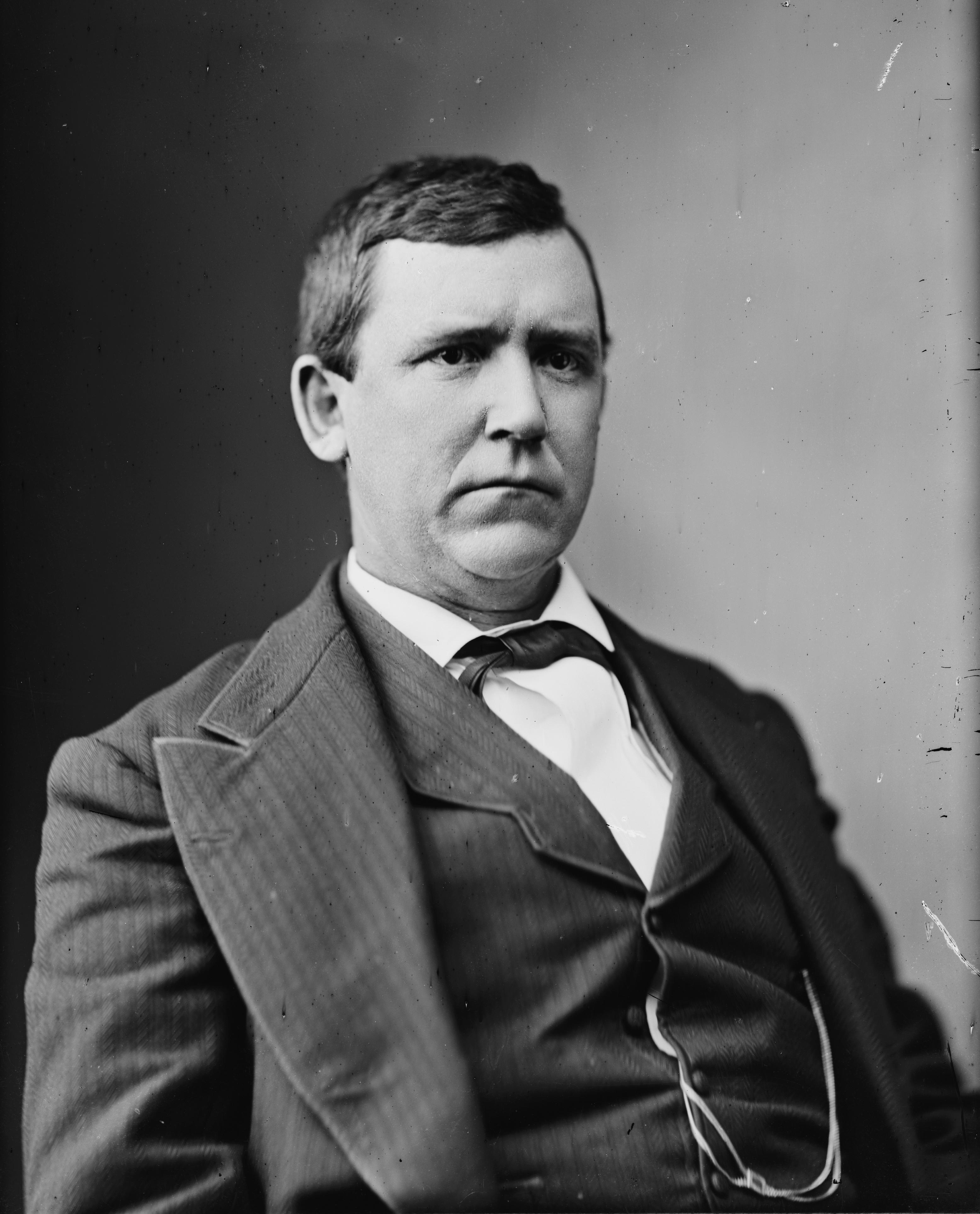
Augustus Garland served as the 11th governor of Arkansas

Following Reconstruction, many Northern and Western states entered a period of rapid economic growth, railroad building, immigration, and industrialization. The period became known as the Gilded Age; real wages grew, but the concentration of wealth became more visible and contentious, leading working-class Americans to calls for reform in the labor, political, and economic systems.

A similar desire for reform was founded in Arkansas, but was impeded by many factors. When Congress voted to approve Augustus Garland as governor a year after a corrupt 1874 election, Arkansas and other Southern states began to envision a revolution in which the old Confederate states could update their economies using Northern capital and industry to replace plantation agriculture. Contemporary Arkansans also believed cultural and social change could come with this transition. Various groups and organizations sought to use the producerism ideology to rebalance income and political power in favor of the working-class and "producers". Although third parties persistently challenged Democratic hegemony in the late 1880s and 1890s, and changes did take place, reform efforts suffered from segregation and exclusion of women. Public corruption, disinclination to organized labor, resistance to change and disfranchisement also slowed reforms, delaying many of the benefit from a new diversified economy into the 20th century.

With the right to suffrage, freedmen began to participate vigorously in the political life of the state. From 1869 to 1893, more than 45 African American men were elected to seats in the state legislature. However, having consolidated power among its supporters, by 1900 the state Democratic Party began relying on all-white primaries at the county and state level. This was one more door closed against blacks, as the primaries had become the only competitive political contests; the Democratic Party primary winner was always elected. In 1900 African Americans numbered 366,984 in the state and made up 28% of the population – together with poor whites, more than one-third of the citizens were disenfranchised. Since they could not vote, they could not serve on juries, which were limited to voters. They were again shut out of the political process.

=== Discontented farmers ===
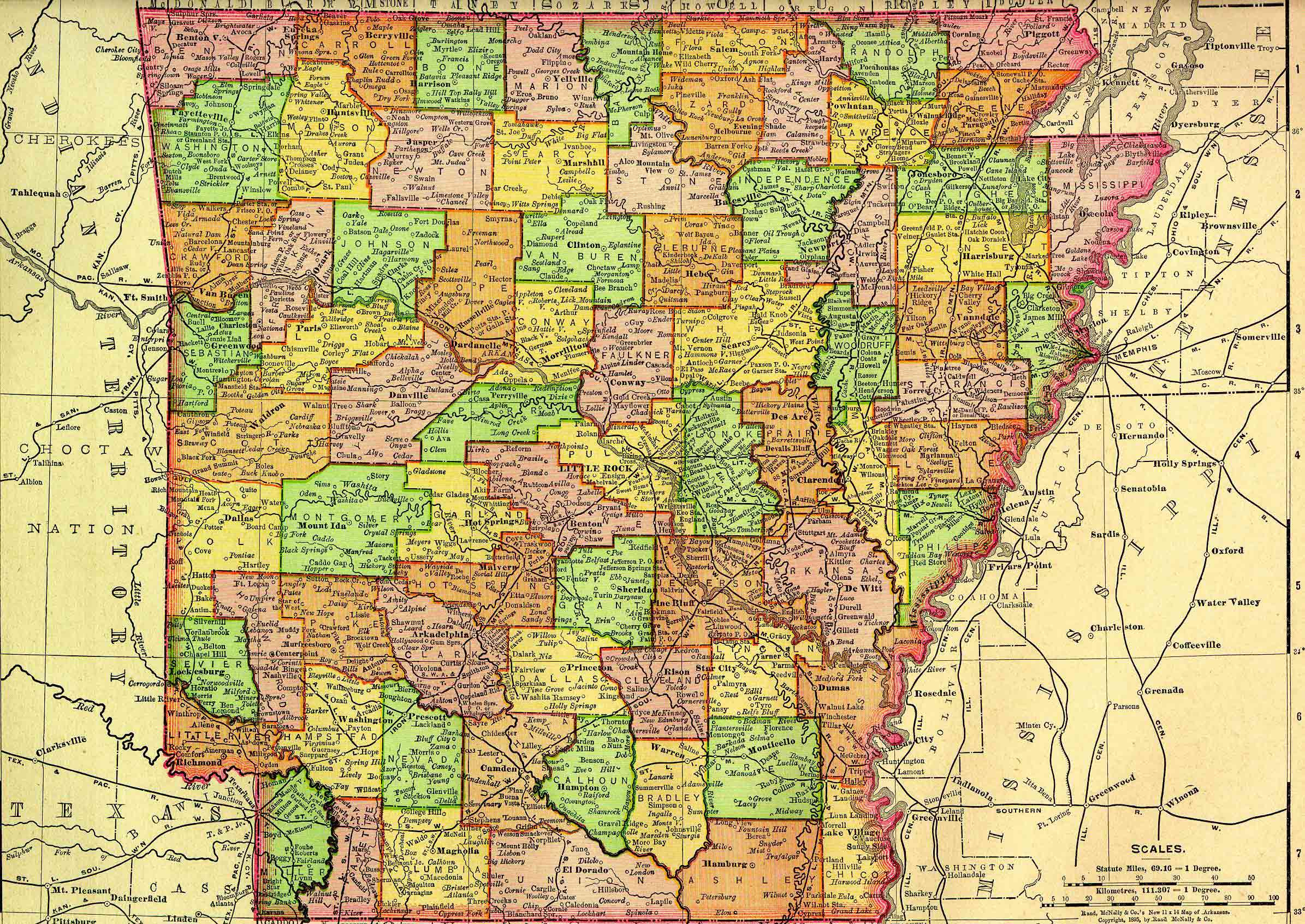
Rand McNally map of Arkansas, 1895

Farmers in Arkansas were devastated following the war, and a combination of forces aligned to further depress the agriculture sector. As the Cotton Belt expanded into Oklahoma and Texas, Arkansas farmers faced new competition from outside their region for the first time, depressing prices. Though railroads had expanded to 2,373 miles (3,819 km) of track in Arkansas by 1895, farmers were often charged higher rates to serve rural areas. Selling cash crops into expanding (and often oversupplied) commodity markets left farmers with limited financial control of their operations. Many took crop liens, putting up their land as collateral to pay for seeds in spring. Looking for a return on investment, the creditors usually insisted that farmers plant largely cotton, which remained the most valuable cash crop. Many chose to plant cotton willingly, resisting calls from agricultural extension agents and university research recommending crop diversification or conservation methods. Cash-poor farmers in the Arkansas Delta and throughout the South often resorted to tenant farming, where tenants work an owner's land in exchange for a fixed percentage of the crop yield. By the Great Depression, most farmers in Arkansas did not own the land they worked. Owning few assets, many in the farm economy had few ways to climb the economic ladder, leaving many Arkansans behind the prosperity seen in other states during the Gay Nineties.

=== Reform efforts ===
The Grange came to Arkansas in 1872, and counted 20,471 members by 1875. The group sought to increase the economic and political interests of the farm family through collectivism. However, the group struggled to initiate reforms in Arkansas under charges of becoming co-opted by political and large-producer interests at the expense of smaller producers, and is historically viewed as pushing both radical and conservative agendas prior to fading from prominence by 1876. The Greenback Party rose as a successor to the Grange nationally, and in Arkansas, to suggest replacement of the bullion-based monetary system (favored by Republicans and Democrats) with greenbacks, a paper money which would fight deflation and thus raise prices for agricultural commodities. The party also pushed for wage increases and labor rights, and included blacks in the state convention (in contrast to the segregated Grange). The party's currency platform was co-opted by Arkansas Democrats in the 1878 elections, causing the Greenback-Labor Party candidates to withdraw in August, though some continued and won as independents. When Democrats reversed support for soft-money policies shortly after the election, some prominent Democrats, including Rufus King Garland Jr., left the Democratic party and resuscitated the Greenback-Labor Party in Arkansas. Having become more of an opposition party than a vehicle for reform, the Arkansas Greenback-Labor Party entered a fusion arrangement with the Arkansas Republicans in 1880, and added repudiation of the state debt incurred during Reconstruction to its platform. The fusion arrangement had limited electoral results, and completely collapsed by 1882, when Republicans ran their own ticket.

Nine frustrated farmers in Prairie County formed an organization called the Grand Agricultural Wheel (usually shortened to Wheel) in 1882 to address issues relevant to the small farmer. Although open to all races, separate black and white Wheels were often formed. Major platform issues for the Wheel included high rates of farm foreclosure, anaconda mortgages, corrupt politicians who failed to assist farming issues, and high railroad rates. Although a strong populous movement, the Wheel struggled to provide a political voice for its supporters. A partnership with the Union Labor Party for the 1888 elections did not provide results as many Wheelers were hesitant to "betray" the Democrats who had traditionally earned their vote.

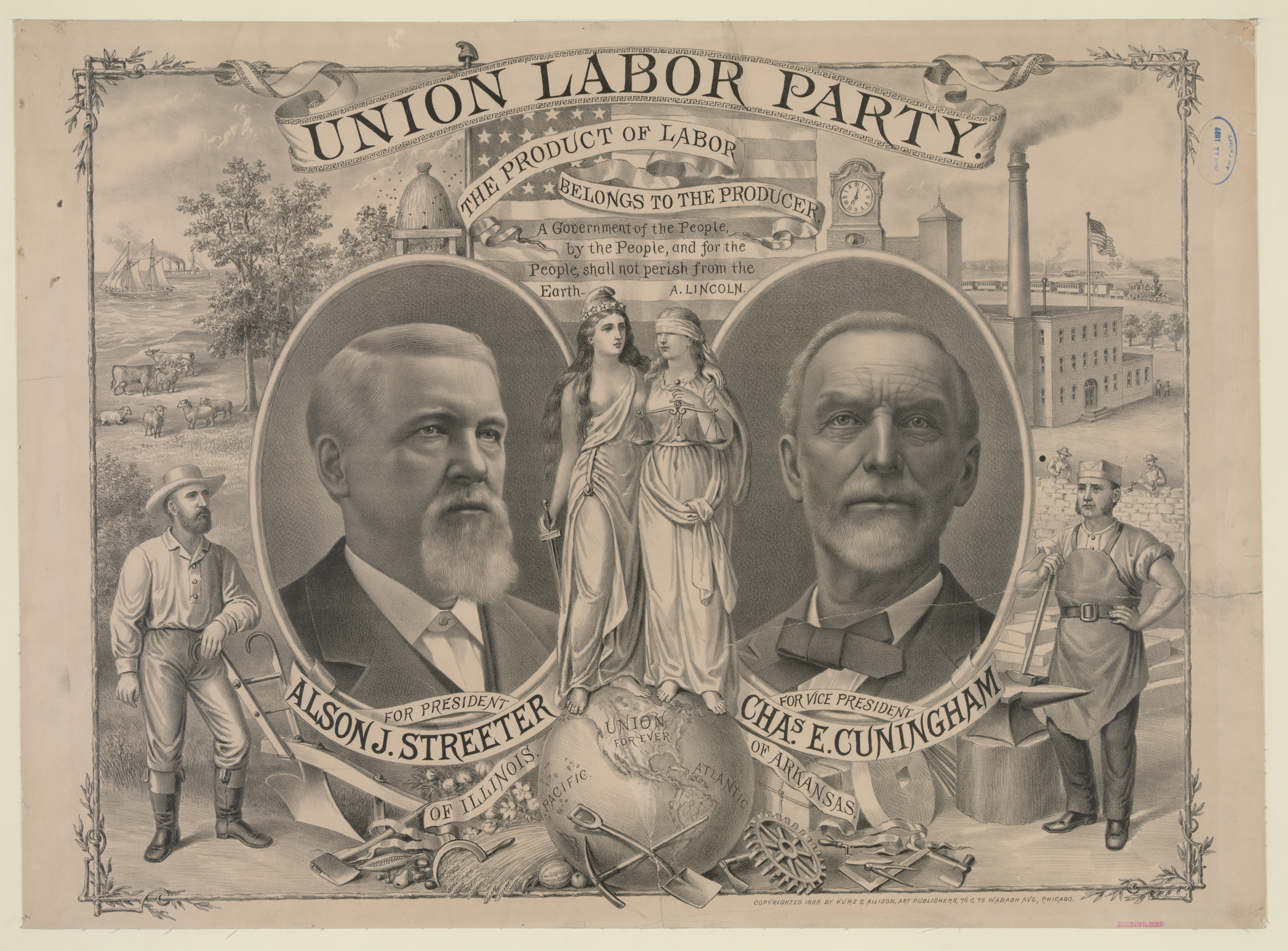
National campaign poster for Alson Streeter for President and Arkansas activist Charles E. Cunningham for Vice President on the Union Labor Party ticket in the 1888 United States presidential election.

Following the disappointing results of that election, the Wheel merged with the Northern Farmer's Alliance in an attempt to combine both organizations' political clout. However, the coalition featured two factions who had the same problems but fundamentally disagreed on how to solve them: one of anti-tariff Southern Democrats and another of Northern farmers who were traditionally Republican and supported tariffs. The group became the Populists in 1890. During the late 1880s and 1890s, the Democrats worked to consolidate their power and prevent alliances among African Americans and poor whites in the years of agricultural depression. They were facing competition from the new Populist and other third parties. In 1891, state legislators passed a statute requiring a literacy test for voter registration, when more than 25% of the population could not read or write. In 1892 the state passed a constitutional amendment that imposed a poll tax and associated residency requirements for voting, which combined barriers sharply reduced the numbers of blacks and poor whites on the voter rolls, and voter participation dropped sharply.

=== Diversification leads to economic growth ===
The "New South" progressive ideals were especially evident in the era's business leaders such as Lee Wilson and Henry Grady. Wilson became one of the most influential Arkansans of his time by exploiting the land, labor and resources available to him. His company towns in northeast Arkansas such as Wilson and Marie attracted poor sharecroppers to his logging and farming operations. Amenities such as company housing, a town doctor, and other company-funded businesses not normally found in small towns drove his empire to grow to be the "World's Largest Plantation". After Wilson's son, Wilson Jr., and his wife returned in 1925 from their honeymoon in England enthralled with the Tudor style, all their public buildings were built with Tudor architecture, including retrofits to all existing public structures. The town incorporated in 1959, selling the houses to the renters living in them and gaining access to tax income it was previously excluded from as a company entity. As technology advanced on the farm, fewer employees were needed and many moved from Wilson to seek other employment.

The Grand Prairie diversified into rice agriculture during this period; and remains a major source of rice production. Economic forces also brought change in the Ozarks, where fruit orchards and vineyards more suitable to the soil, climate, and topography had long supplanted row agriculture. As fruit production moved to more productive areas of the United States, a variety of new crops and methods swept across the hills and hollers of the Ozarks. Poultry, dairy, and cattle production spread quickly in Benton and Washington counties, but did not follow into other parts of the Ozarks. Mining and logging were prevalent where natural resources remained available.

The growth in industrial jobs in the Northeast and Midwest attracted many blacks from the South in the first half of the 20th century. Their migration out of the South was a reach toward a better quality of life where they could vote and live more fully as citizens. Tractors and other new equipment displaced manual labor; fewer farm workers were needed and tens of thousands left the state for nearby cities such as Memphis as well as more distant St. Louis and Chicago. During the 1940s blacks also migrated to Los Angeles and the West Coast, where good jobs were expanding in defense industries.

== 20th century ==
=== 1900–1932 ===
The Progressive Era operated at the national level as Arkansas supported President Woodrow Wilson. At the state level the main themes were reforms demanded by women—who could not vote but could appeal to their menfolk. The Women's Christian Temperance Union and the Arkansas Prohibition Alliance advocated for local option and ultimately succeeded in getting a statewide ban on alcohol in 1915. The same reformers demanded the vote. Women's suffrage in Arkansas gained traction, with activists pushing for enfranchisement and succeeding in getting the right to vote in primary elections in 1917. In 1920 the Nineteenth Amendment to the United States Constitution finally gave women the right to vote in state and federal elections. In practice this meant white women only. The cruel punishment involved in Convict leasing—with businesses using unpaid prisoners—was abolished in Arkansas by Governor George Washington Donaghey. He furloughed prisoners to end the practice. Arkansas's educational system was also a concern for progressives, who sought to improve literacy and education in the state. While some improvements were made, Arkansas's children still received a subpar education, and funding remained a significant issue. Junius Marion Futrell, who became governor in 1932, campaigned on retrenchment, resulting in a reduction in state expenditures and a new crisis in education.

With the arrival of the cheap Ford Model T in 1908, the state realized it needed to rapidly improve its roads. Historically roads were handled by county government at very low cost. The state now attempted to coordinate road construction with a commission, but poorly supervised and coordinated construction led to inadequate support for automobiles. The state qualified for federal aid in 1917, but by 1921, the road system was in disarray, and federal funds were withdrawn due to a lack of centralization. Governor John Ellis Martineau launched an ambitious state highway construction program, but the economic situation and drought of 1930–31 hindered its success. By 1933, the state's highway debt was $146,000,000. In 1934 Governor Junius Marion Futrell devised a strategy to consolidate it through the Highway Refunding Act.

=== Elaine massacre of 1919 ===
Race relations grew tense during this time, with many poor whites blaming freedmen for their unemployment. At the same time, blacks felt they were being exploited and underpaid by white plantation owners. In 1919, 100 frustrated black farmers gathered near Elaine to discuss how to receive a fair wage for their work on the plantations. A fight broke out when a sheriff and railroad detective arrived at the church. The white deputy was wounded and the white detective killed. As word spread of a "black uprising", whites came from the surrounding area to quell the "rebellion". Chaos ensued for three days in the town, with mobs roaming the street and random killings throughout. Federal troops found the town in a state of violence and were ultimately able to disarm the groups. Five whites and between 100 and 200 blacks were killed.

=== Great Depression and the New Deal ===
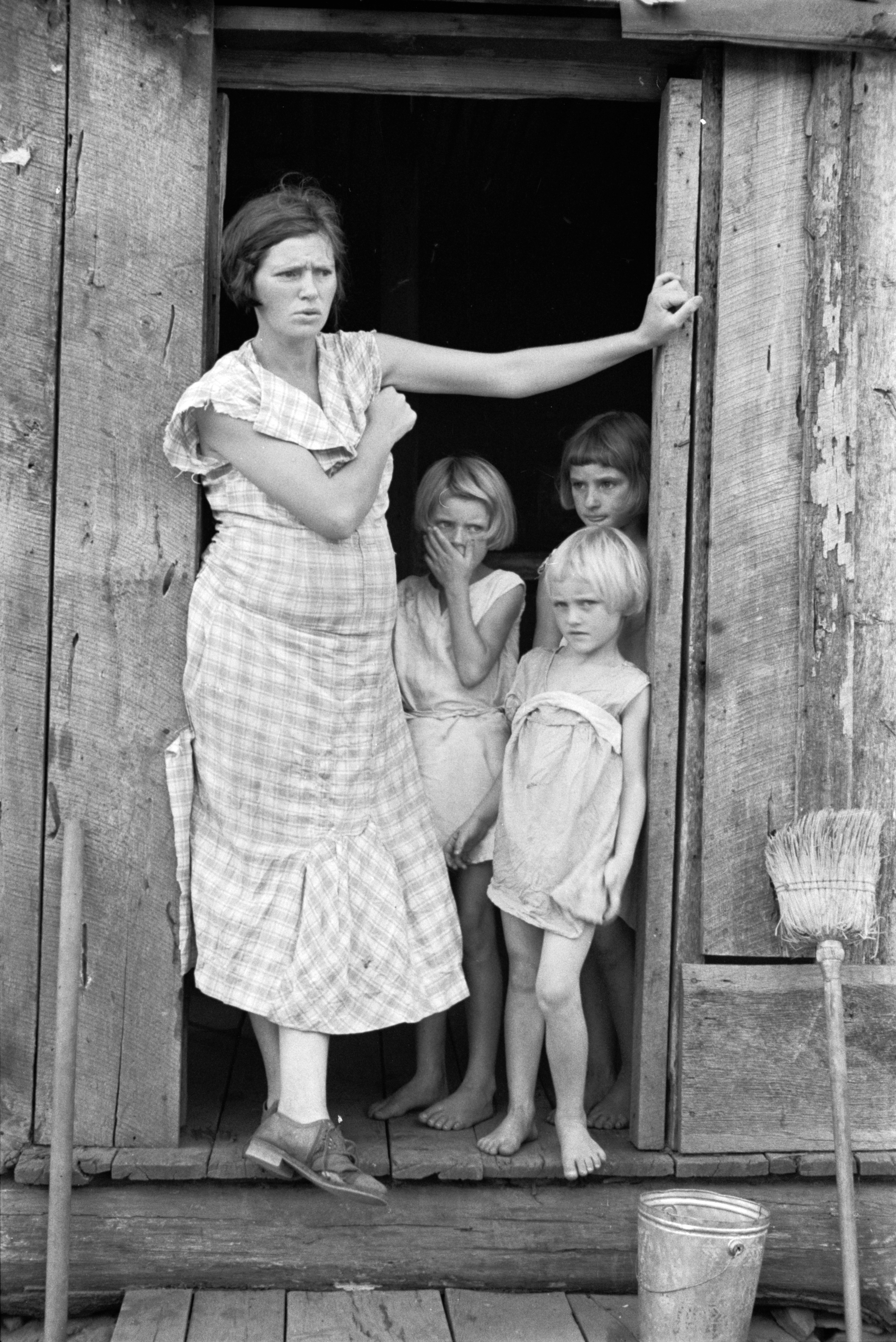
Wife and children of a sharecropper in Washington County, Arkansas, c. 1935

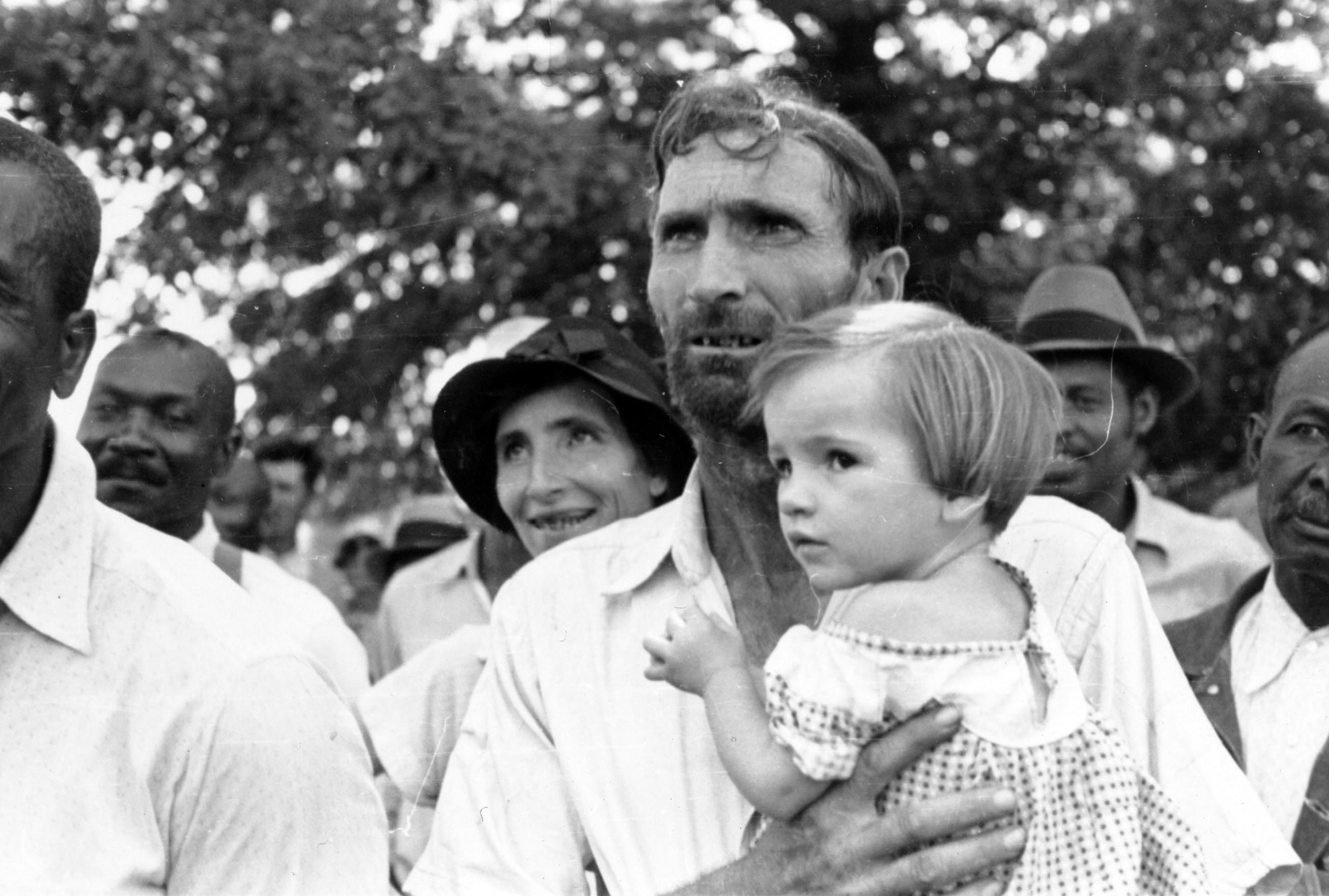
Man with child at a meeting of the Southern Tenant Farmers Union, 1937

The Great Depression caused severe economic hardship, exacerbated by severe droughts and the Great Mississippi Flood of 1927. In response, voters elected a progressive governor, Harvey Parnell, in 1928. Though Parnell was able to implement some reforms, such as improvements to education, highways and tax reform, the situation had deteriorated too much by 1932 for state assistance to make a difference. Arkansaw remained overwhelmingly Democratic. The New Deal's Agricultural Adjustment Act helped restore cotton prices, while federal relief programs such as the CCC and WPA provided jobs for unemployed men and some women.

With a rural economy based primarily on cotton, Arkansas was hard-hit in the Great Depression in the United States. Severe droughts in the 1930s and the Great Mississippi Flood of 1927 greatly worsened the pain caused by low commodity prices in the early 1920s. Arkansans sought reforms during the era, electing Harvey Parnell governor in 1928, a progressive campaigning on education, highways, and tax reform. Implementation of reforms was limited by a struggling farm economy, natural disasters, and a strong tradition of low taxes. By the 1932 elections, the situation had devolved beyond the capacity of state assistance. Arkansans supported Franklin Roosevelt in huge numbers, while also electing the conservative Democrat J. M. Futrell on a retrenchment platform.

The Agricultural Adjustment Act restored cotton prices and FDR's numerous federal relief programs, such as the CCC and WPA provided jobs primarily for unemployed men and for women who were heads of family.

Hattie Caraway (1878–1950) was the first woman elected to serve a full term as a United States Senator. She was appointed to succeed her husband who died in office in 1931. She was reelected in her own right in January 1932. She was reelected to a full term in November 1932, with considerable help from Louisiana Senator Huey Long. She won another term in 1938. However, in 1944, Caraway ran fourth in the Democratic primary, losing her Senate seat to freshman congressman J. William Fulbright, the young, dynamic former president of the University of Arkansas who had already gained a national reputation.

=== World War II ===
World War II restored prosperity. Many farmers, especially blacks, left for much better-paying jobs in industrial centers. Cotton plantations ran short of unskilled labor to pick their crop, and were assisted by the US Department of Agriculture in finding workers. Based on the order of President Franklin D. Roosevelt given shortly after Imperial Japan's attack on Pearl Harbor, nearly 16,000 Japanese Americans were forcibly removed from the West Coast of the United States and incarcerated in two internment camp located in the Arkansas Delta. The Rohwer Camp in Desha County operated from September 1942 to November 1945 and its peak interned 8,475 persons. The Jerome War Relocation Center in Drew County operated from October 1942 to June 1944 and held circa 8,000 persons.

=== Civil rights era ===
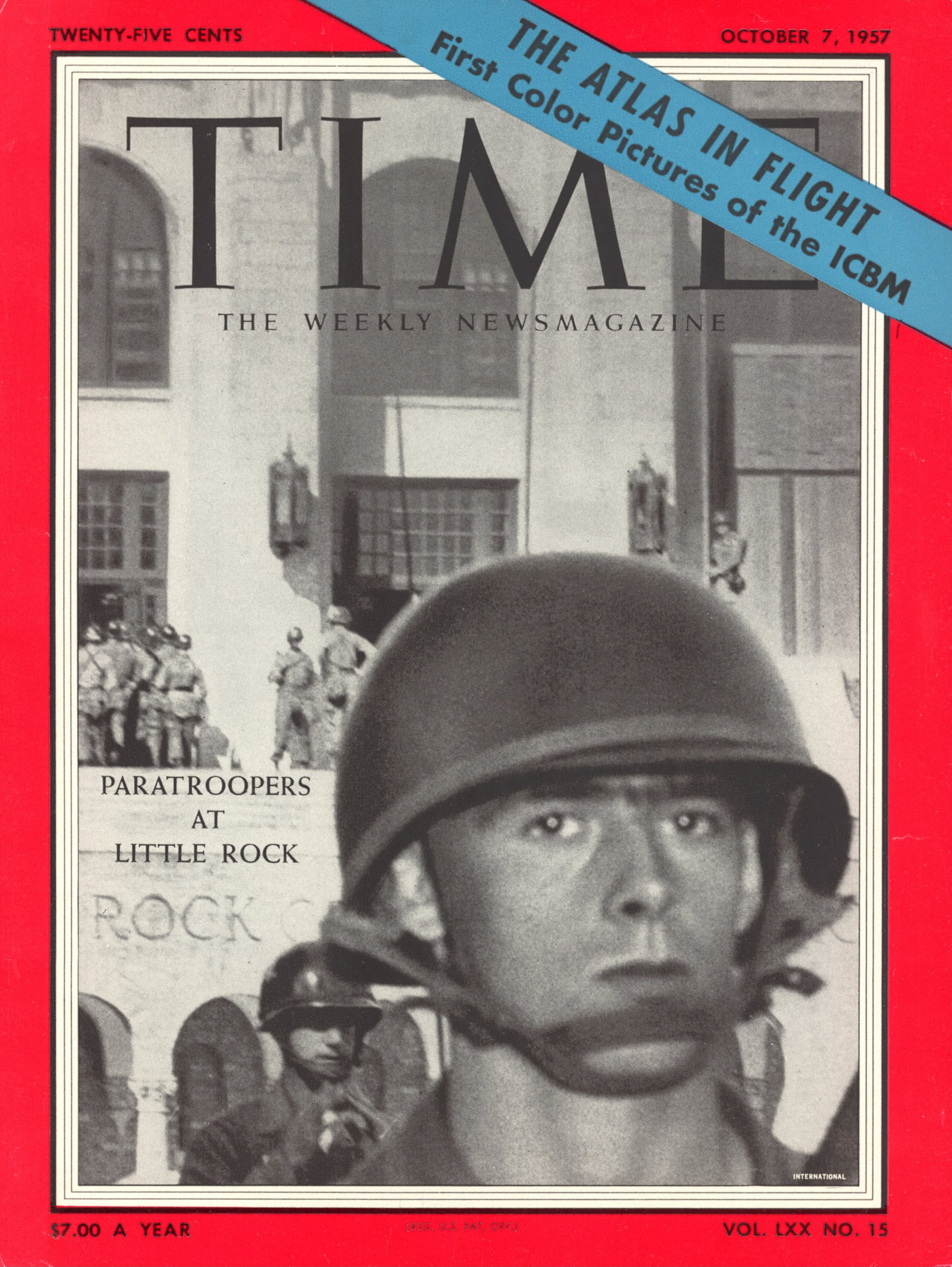
Time magazine (October 7, 1957), featuring Army paratroopers at Little Rock.

In 1948, the University of Arkansas integrated its Schools of Law and Medicine, becoming the first school in any Southern U.S. state to accept black students. In one of the first major cases of the Civil Rights Movement, the Supreme Court ruled in Brown v. Topeka Board of Education (1954) that segregated schools were unconstitutional. Both of Arkansas's U.S. Senators (J. William Fulbright and John L. McClellan) and all six of its U.S. Representatives were among those who signed the Southern Manifesto in response. Despite this, success was made in integrating higher education in the state of Arkansas, Public schools in Fayetteville, Charleston and Hoxie public schools also saw integration by 1955.

The Little Rock Nine incident of 1957 centered around Little Rock Central High School brought Arkansas to national attention. After the Little Rock School Board had voted to begin carrying out desegregation in compliance with the law, segregationist protesters physically blocked nine black students recruited by the NAACP from entering the school. Governor Orval Faubus deployed the Arkansas National Guard to support the segregationists, and only backed down after Judge Ronald Davies of U.S. District Court for the Eastern District of Arkansas granted an injunction from the U.S. Department of Justice compelling him to withdraw the Guard. White mobs began to riot when the nine black students began attending school. President Dwight D. Eisenhower, on the request of Little Rock's mayor, deployed the 101st Airborne Division to Little Rock and federalized the Arkansas National Guard to protect the students and ensure their safe passed to school. Little Rock's four public high schools were closed in September 1958, only reopening a year later. Integration across all grades was finally achieved in fall 1972. The Little Rock school episode drew international attention to the treatment of African Americans in the United States. The Civil Rights era also saw the Freedom Rides in 1961, and the integration of the University of Arkansas in 1964.

Changing racial attitudes and growth in jobs have created a New Great Migration since the 1970s, with African Americans moving to Northern cities and to metropolitan areas within the South.

=== 1960s and 1970s ===
In the 1960s and 1970s, Arkansas, like the rest of the United States, experienced significant social and political changes. Arkansas was heavily affected by the Vietnam War, with thousands of its young men drafted into the military in an increasingly unpopular war. Many protests and demonstrations against the war took across the state, especially on college campuses. The economy underwent significant changes, with the decline of agriculture and the growth of manufacturing and service industries. State politics saw the rise of Governor Winthrop Rockefeller, a moderate Republican from a famous family. He sought to modernize the state and improve race relations. He was elected in 1966 and served two terms, during which he implemented various reforms, including modernizing the state's prison system and improving education. The 1970s saw the election of Democrat David Pryor as governor, who continued some of Rockefeller's initiatives and also focused on environmental conservation and economic development.

== President Bill Clinton ==
In 1978, at 32 years old, Bill Clinton was elected governor of Arkansas, becoming in 1979 the youngest governor in the country. During his ten-year tenure, he worked on educational reform, improved the state's economy, and became a nationally prominent leader of the centrist New Democrats. Clinton's wife, Hillary Clinton, chaired the Arkansas Education Standards Committee and proposed reforms that transformed the state's education system. In the 1980s, the Clintons' personal and business affairs became the basis of the Whitewater controversy, which he ultimately survived. Clinton was a death penalty opponent in his early years but oversaw the state's first executions since 1964 in his final term as governor. Clinton hoped to run for president in 1988 but gave a poorly delivered speech at the Democratic National Convention. He recovered and was elected 42nd president in the 1992 election. A Democrat, he battled an energized Republican opposition and was reelected in 1996. His term ended in January 2001; he then relocated to New York.

== 21st century ==
The economy grew steadily, albeit with short dips during the Great Recession of 2008–2009 and the COVID-19 pandemic of 2020–2022. Walmart continues to be the major employer and economic force in Arkansas. The retail giant is headquartered in Bentonville, and employs tens of thousands of people in the state. The company has invested in a number of initiatives to support Arkansas communities, including education and workforce development programs. Its leadership has a strong religious bent which fits into the religiosity of most residents. Tyson Foods, a major food processing company, is also headquartered in Arkansas and also has a religious tone. The company has faced criticism in recent years for its labor practices, but remains an important employer and economic contributor in the state.

In 2013, the state enacted a major tax cut that reduced income tax rates for many high income residents and businesses. The tax cut was controversial, with critics arguing that it would lead to budget shortfalls and cuts to public services. In December, 2021. the legislature passed the largest income tax cut in the state's history. In April 2023 Governor Sarah Huckabee Sanders signed a $124 million tax cut into law.

The state has invested heavily in infrastructure projects in recent years, including the expansion of highways and the development of a river port in Little Rock. These projects are aimed at improving transportation and logistics, which are key components of Arkansas's economy.

Tornado damage was a danger every year. In 2006, a tornado outbreak caused widespread damage and killed 13 people. In 2011, a series of tornadoes caused significant damage and killed 16 people. In August 2005, category-5 Hurricane Katrina caused significant damage to the southern regions.

Protestant churches made abortion a major target, In 2015, Governor Asa Hutchinson signed into law a bill that effectively banned abortion after 12 weeks of pregnancy.

On November 8, 2016, Arkansas voters approved Issue 6, the Arkansas Medical Marijuana Amendment, to legalize the medical use of cannabis.

In 2017, Arkansas executed four death row inmates in an eight-day period, marking the first time any state had executed that many people in such a short time since the death penalty was reinstated in the United States in 1976.

In 2020–2022, the COVID-19 pandemic had a significant impact. By March 2022, there had been 819,984 cumulative cases with 10,524 deaths.

== See also ==
- African Americans in Arkansas
- Women's suffrage in Arkansas
- Education in Arkansas
- List of historical societies in Arkansas
- History of the Southern United States
- Black Belt in the American South
- Deep South

== Bibliography ==
- Encyclopedia of Arkansas (2023) online, over 7000 entries by experts.

=== Surveys ===
- Arnold, Morris S., et al. Arkansas: A Concise History (2019) extract.
- Arnold, Morris S.; DeBlack, Thomas A.; Sabo III, George; Whayne, Jeannie M. (2002). Arkansas: A narrative history (1st ed.). Fayetteville, Arkansas: The University of Arkansas Press. ISBN 1-55728-724-4. OCLC 49029558.
- Bolton, S. Charles. Arkansas, 1800-1860: Remote and Restless (1998), a major scholarly history.
- DeBlack, Thomas A. With Fire and Sword: Arkansas, 1861–1874. U. of Arkansas Pr., 2003. 307 pp. a major scholarly history.
- Dillard, Tom W. and Michael B. Dougan. Arkansas History: A Selected Research Bibliography (1984)
- Donovan, Timothy Paul, Willard B. Gatewood, and Jeannie M. Whayne, eds. The Governors of Arkansas: Essays in Political Biography (U of Arkansas Press, 1995).
- Fletcher, John Gould (1989). Carpenter, Lucas (ed.). Arkansas. Vol. 2. Fayetteville, Arkansas: University of Arkansas Press. ISBN 1-55728-040-1. OCLC 555740849.
- Herndon, Dallas Tabor (1922). The Highlights of Arkansas History (2nd special ed.). p. 110.
- Herndon, Dallas T. (1947). Annals of Arkansas. Vol. 1–4. Hopkinsville, Kentucky: The Historical Record Association. ISBN 978-1-56546-450-6. LCCN 48002456. OCLC 3920841.
- Hopper, Shay E. et al. An Arkansas History for Young People (4th ed. 2008) for middle schools and junior high schools.
- Johnson III, Ben F. (2019). Arkansas in Modern America Since 1930 (2nd ed.). Fayetteville: University of Arkansas Press. ISBN 978-1-68226-102-6. LCCN 2019000981.
- Moneyhon, Carl H. (1997). West, Elliott (ed.). Arkansas and the New South, 1874-1929. University of Arkansas Press. ISBN 1-55728-490-3. LCCN 97026932. OL 680393M.; a major scholarly history.
- Whayne, Jeannie M., et al. Arkansas: A Narrative History (University of Arkansas Press, 2013)

=== Civil War and Reconstruction ===
- Atkinson, James H. "The Brooks-Baxter Contest". Arkansas Historical Quarterly 4.2 (1945): 124–149. in JSTOR
- Bailey, Anne, and Daniel E. Sutherland. Civil War Arkansas: Beyond Battles and Leaders (U of Arkansas Press, 2000).
- Bailey, Anne J., and Daniel E. Sutherland. "The history and historians of Civil War Arkansas". Arkansas Historical Quarterly 58.3 (1999): 232–63. in JSTOR, historiography.
- Bolton, S. Charles. Fugitivism: Escaping Slavery in the Lower Mississippi Valley, 1820–1860 (University of Arkansas Press, 2019) online
- Bradbury, John F. "'Buckwheat Cake Philanthropy': Refugees and the Union Army in the Ozarks". Arkansas Historical Quarterly 57.3 (1998): 233–254. in JSTOR
- Christ, Mark K. Civil War Arkansas, 1863: The Battle for a State (University of Oklahoma Press, 2010) 321 pp. ISBN 978-0-8061-4087-2
- Christ, Mark K., ed. Rugged and Sublime: the Civil War in Arkansas (U of Arkansas Press, 1994).
- DeBlack, Thomas A. "'A Harnessed Revolution': Reconstruction in Arkansas". in Arkansas: A Narrative History, eds. Jeannie M. Whayne, Thomas A. DeBlack, George Sabo III, and Morris S. Arnold, (University of Arkansas Press, 2002) pp 219–27.
- Dillard, Tom. "To the Back of the Elephant: Racial Conflict in the Arkansas Republican Party". Arkansas Historical Quarterly 33.1 (1974): 3–15. in JSTOR
- Dougan, Michael B. (1991) [1976]. Confederate Arkansas: The People and Policies of a Frontier State in Wartime. Tuscaloosa, Alabama: University of Alabama Press. ISBN 0-8173-5230-9. LCCN 76-40053.
- Ferguson, John L., ed. (1965). Arkansas and the Civil War. Little Rock, Arkansas: Pioneer Press. LCCN 64-25874. OCLC 951171.
- Finley, Randy. From Slavery to Uncertain Freedom: The Freedman's Bureau in Arkansas 1865–1869 (U of Arkansas Press, 1996).
- Foster, B.T. "Arkansas" in Aaron Sheehan-Dean, ed. A Companion to the US Civil War (2 vol. 2014) pp 338–64.
- Huff, Leo E. "Guerrillas, Jayhawkers and Bushwhackers in Northern Arkansas during the Civil War". Arkansas Historical Quarterly 24.2 (1965): 127–148. JSTOR
- Hume, Richard L. "The Arkansas Constitutional Convention of 1868: A Case Study in the Politics of Reconstruction". Journal of Southern History 39.2 (1973): 183–206. in JSTOR
- Ledbetter, Cal. "The Constitution of 1868: Conqueror's Constitution or Constitutional Continuity?". Arkansas Historical Quarterly 44.1 (1985): 16–41. in JSTOR
- Ledbetter Jr., Cal (Summer 1988). "General James Miller: Hawthorne's Hero in Arkansas". Arkansas Historical Quarterly. 47 (2): 99–115. doi:10.2307/40038144. JSTOR 40038144.
- Lovett, Bobby L. "African Americans, Civil War, and Aftermath in Arkansas". Arkansas Historical Quarterly 54.3 (1995): 304–358. in JSTOR
- Lovett, Bobby L. "Some 1871 Accounts for the Little Rock, Arkansas Freedmen's Savings and Trust Company". Journal of Negro History 66.4 (1981): 326–328. online
- Moneyhon, Carl H. The Impact of the Civil War and Reconstruction on Arkansas: Persistence in the Midst of Ruin (U of Arkansas Press, 2002).
- Neal, Diane, and Thomas W. Kremm. The Lion of the South: General Thomas C. Hindman (Mercer University Press, 1997).
- Price, Jeffrey R. A Courage and Desperation Rarely Equaled: The 36th Arkansas Infantry Regiment (Confederate States Army), 26 June 1862-25 May 1865. (Army Command And General Staff Coll Fort Leavenworth KS, 2003) online.
- Richter, William L. "'A Dear Little Job': Second Lieutenant Hiram F. Willis, Freedmen's Bureau Agent in Southwestern Arkansas, 1866–1868". Arkansas Historical Quarterly 50.2 (1991): 158–200. in JSTOR
- Staples, Thomas Starling. Reconstruction in Arkansas, 1862–1874. (Columbia UP, 1923). online
- Sutherland, Daniel E. "Guerrillas: The Real War in Arkansas". Arkansas Historical Quarterly 52.3 (1993): 257–285. in JSTOR
- Urwin, Gregory J.W. "'We cannot treat negroes... as prisoners of war': Racial Atrocities and Reprisals in Civil War Arkansas". Civil War History 42.3 (1996): 193–210.
- Wintory, Blake. "William Hines Furbush: African-American Carpetbagger, Republican, Fusionist, and Democrat". Arkansas Historical Quarterly 63.2 (2004): 107–165. in JSTOR
- Wintory, Blake J. "African-American Legislators in the Arkansas General Assembly, 1868–1893". Arkansas Historical Quarterly 65.4 (2006): 385–434. in JSTOR
- Woodward, Earl F. "The Brooks and Baxter War in Arkansas, 1872–1874". Arkansas Historical Quarterly 30.4 (1971): 315–336. in JSTOR

=== Specialized studies ===
- Arnold, Morris S. (Winter 1983). "The Relocation of Arkansas Post to Ecores Rouges in 1779". Arkansas Historical Quarterly. 42 (4): 317–331. doi:10.2307/40020772. JSTOR 40020772.
- Arnold, Morris S. (Spring 1992). "The Significance of the Arkansas Colonial Experience". Arkansas Historical Quarterly. 51 (1): 69–82. doi:10.2307/40038202. JSTOR 40038202.
- Ashcraft, Ginger L. (Autumn 1973). "Antoine Barraque and His Involvement in Indian Affairs of Southeast Arkansas, 1816-1832". Arkansas Historical Quarterly. 32 (3). Arkansas Historical Association: 226–240. doi:10.2307/40038112. JSTOR 40038112.
- Blair, Diane D. "The Big Three of Late Twentieth-Century Arkansas Politics: Dale Bumpers, Bill Clinton, and David Pryor." Arkansas Historical Quarterly 54.1 (1995): 53–79. online
- Blevins, Brooks. Hill Folks: A History of Arkansas Ozarkers and Their Image (University of North Carolina Press, 2003).
- Bolton, S. Charles (Spring 1999). "Slavery and the Defining of Arkansas". The Arkansas Historical Quarterly. 58 (1): 1–23. doi:10.2307/40026271. JSTOR 40026271.
- Eno, Clara B. (Spring 1945). "Territorial Governors of Arkansas". The Arkansas Historical Quarterly. 4 (4): 276–284. doi:10.2307/40018362. JSTOR 40018362.
- Gatewood, Willard B; Whayne, Jeannie (1993). The Arkansas Delta: A Land of Paradox. Fayetteville, Arkansas: University of Arkansas Press. ISBN 1-55728-287-0.
- Gordon, Fon Louise. Caste and Class: The Black Experience in Arkansas, 1880-1920 (University of Georgia Press, 2007) online.
- Hendricks, Nancy. Senator Hattie Caraway: An Arkansas Legacy (Arcadia Publishing, 2013) online.
- Hild, Matthew (2018). Arkansas's Gilded Age: The Rise, Decline, and Legacy of Populism and Working-Class Protest. Columbia, Missouri: University of Missouri Press. ISBN 9780826221667. LCCN 2018021863. OCLC 1030391765.
- Johnson, William R. (Spring 1965). "Prelude to the Missouri Compromise: A New York Congressman's Effort to Exclude Slavery from Arkansas Territory". Arkansas Historical Quarterly. 24 (1): 47–66. doi:10.2307/40023964. JSTOR 40023964.
- Kirk, John A (2011). "Not Quite Black and White: School Desegregation in Arkansas, 1954-1966". Arkansas Historical Quarterly. 70 (3): 225–257. JSTOR 23193404.
- Lyon, Owen (Autumn 1950). "The Trail of the Quapaw". Arkansas Historical Quarterly. 9 (3): 205–213. doi:10.2307/40017228. JSTOR 40017228.
- Mattison, Ray H. (Summer 1957). "Arkansas Post: Its Human Aspects". Arkansas Historical Quarterly. 16 (2): 117–138. doi:10.2307/40018446. JSTOR 40018446.
- Miller, Fayneese. "Fifty years later: Understanding and responding to the challenges, implications, and legacy of Little Rock Nine and Sputnik." Journal of Curriculum and Pedagogy 6.2 (2009): 63–67. online
- Moneyhon, Carl H. (Spring 1999). "The Slave Family in Arkansas". Arkansas Historical Quarterly. 58 (1): 24–44. doi:10.2307/40026272. JSTOR 40026272.
- Niswonger, Richard L. (1990) Arkansas Democratic Politics, 1896-1920
- Scroggs, Jack B. (Autumn 1961). "Arkansas Statehood: A Study in State and National Political Schism". Arkansas Historical Quarterly. 20 (3): 227–244. doi:10.2307/40038048. JSTOR 40038048.
- Smith, C. Calvin. War and wartime changes: The transformation of Arkansas, 1940-1945 (University of Arkansas Press, 1986).
- Stockley, Grif. Ruled by Race : Black/White Relations in Arkansas from Slavery to the Present (U of Arkansas Press, 2008).
- Strausberg, Stephen F. (1995). From Hills and Hollers: Rise of the Poultry Industry in Arkansas. Fayetteville: Arkansas Agricultural Experiment Station. ISBN 0962285811. OCLC 32922427.
- Switzer, Ronald R. Arkansas, Forgotten Land of Plenty: Settlement and Economic Development, 1540-1900 (McFarland, 2019) online review
- Taylor, Orville. Negro Slavery in Arkansas (1958; reprinted University of Arkansas Press, 2000). online
- Thomas, Charles E. (1986). Jelly Roll, A Black Neighborhood in a Southern Mill Town. Fayetteville, Arkansas: The University of Arkansas Press. ISBN 9781557289827. LCCN 2012005191.
- Walton, Brian G. "The Second Party System in Arkansas, 1836-1848". Arkansas Historical Quarterly 28.2 (1969): 120–155. online
- White, Lonnie J. (Autumn 1962). "Arkansas Territorial Indian Affairs". Arkansas Historical Quarterly. 21 (3): 193–212. doi:10.2307/40018929. JSTOR 40018929.
- Worley, Ted R. (May 1949). "Arkansas and the Money Crisis of 1836-1837". The Journal of Southern History. 15 (2): 178–191. doi:10.2307/2197996. JSTOR 2197996.
- Worley, Ted R. (Spring 1964). "The Arkansas State Bank: Ante-Bellum Period". Arkansas Historical Quarterly. 23 (1): 65–73. doi:10.2307/40021172. JSTOR 40021172.

=== Primary sources ===
- Gigantino, James J., ed. Slavery and Secession in Arkansas: A Documentary History (U of Arkansas Press, 2015)
- Jolliffe, David A., et al. The Arkansas Delta Oral History Project: Culture, Place, and Authenticity (Syracuse University Press, 2016) online also see online review.
- Lewis, Catherine M., and J. Richard Lewis, eds. Race, Politics, and Memory: A Documentary History of the Little Rock School Crisis (University of Arkansas Press, 2007)
- Williams, C. Fred et al. eds. A Documentary History of Arkansas (U of Arkansas Press, 2014). 460pp
- Work Projects Administration. Slave Narratives: a Folk History of Slavery in the United States / From Interviews with Former Slaves / Arkansas Narratives (7 parts; 2010 reprint)
