= William Selden =

American politician

6th Treasurer of the United States
- In office July 22, 1839 – November 23, 1850
- President: Martin Van Buren; William Henry Harrison; John Tyler; James K. Polk; Zachary Taylor; Millard Fillmore
- Preceded by: John Campbell
- Succeeded by: John Sloane

Personal details
- Born: January 31, 1791
- Died: April 7, 1874 (aged 83)
- Spouse(s): Maria Eliza Swann Selden (1833-1834, her death); Emily Hunter (1840-1874, his death)
- Children: 9

William Selden (January 31, 1791 – April 7, 1874) served as Treasurer of the United States between July 22, 1839 and Nov 23, 1850, under the administration of six Presidents.

Selden was born in Henrico County, Virginia, to Miles Selden and Elizabeth Armistead Selden. He was a member for Henrico County in the Virginia House of Delegates 1813–1816 and 1818–1821. He later served as Registrar of the Land Office. He married twice, first to Maria Eliza Swann in 1833 having one child, and then to Emily Hunter in 1840 having eight children.

Political offices
| Preceded by John Campbell | Treasurer of the United States; 1839–1850 | Succeeded by John Sloane |
