= John Campbell (US Treasurer) =

American politician

5th Treasurer of the United States
- In office May 26, 1829 – July 20, 1839
- President: Andrew Jackson; Martin Van Buren
- Preceded by: William Clark
- Succeeded by: William Selden

Personal details
- Born: c. 1789
- Died: 1866 (c. aged 77)
- Party: Democratic

John Campbell (c. 1789 – c. 1866) was the fifth Treasurer of the United States, serving under both Presidents Andrew Jackson and Martin Van Buren. He was in office from May 26, 1829 to July 20, 1839. Campbell has the distinction of being the first Treasurer to be born a citizen of the United States.

Political offices
Preceded by William Clark	Treasurer of the United States; 1829–1839	Succeeded by William Selden
