= Index of Arkansas-related articles =

The location of the state of Arkansas in the United States of America

The following is an alphabetical list of articles related to the U.S. state of Arkansas.

== 0–9 ==
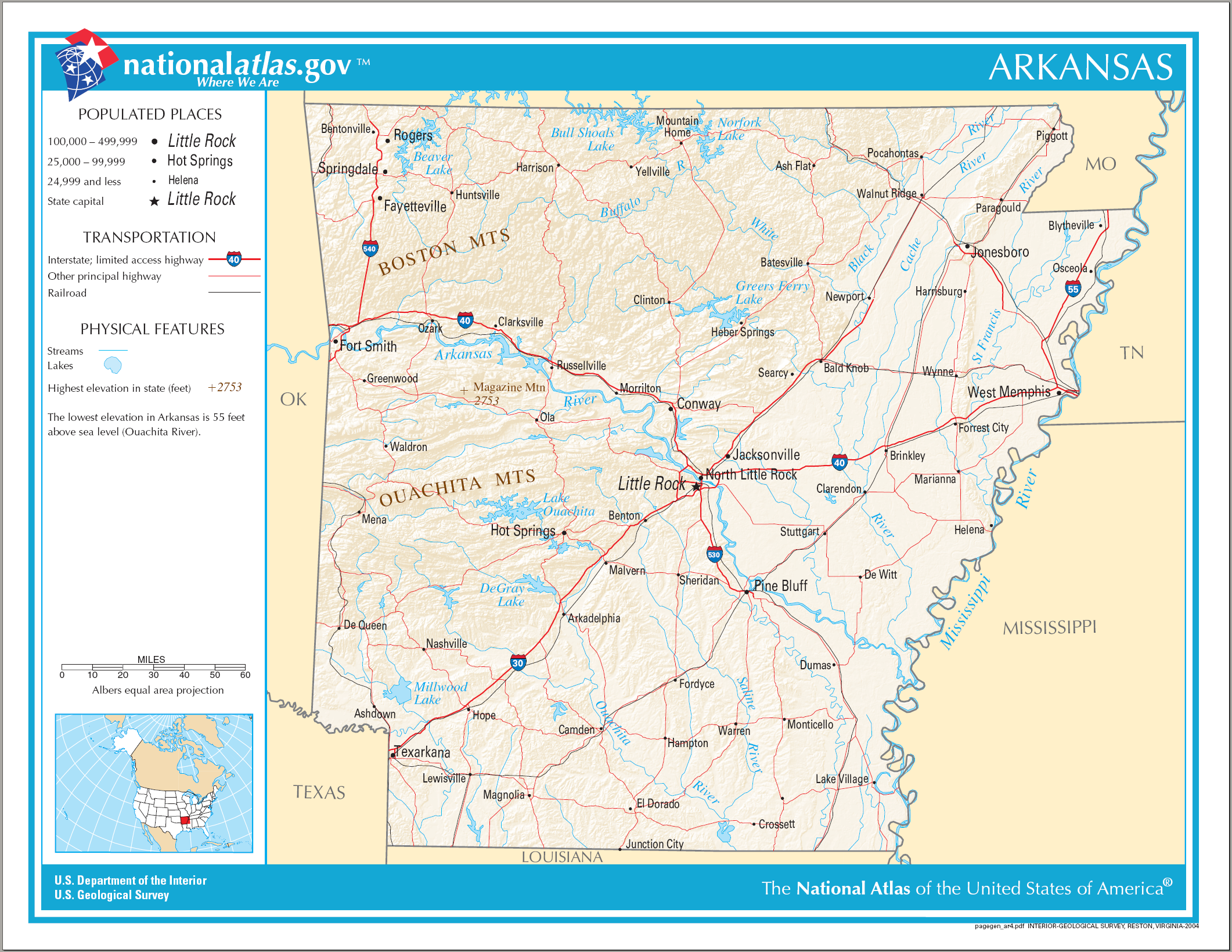
An enlargeable map of the state of Arkansas

- .ar.us – Internet second-level domain for the state of Arkansas
- 25th state to join the United States of America

== A ==
- Abortion in Arkansas
- Action at Ashley's Station
- Adams-Onís Treaty of 1819
- Adjacent states:
  - State of Louisiana
  - State of Mississippi
  - State of Missouri
  - State of Oklahoma
  - State of Tennessee
  - State of Texas
- Agriculture in Arkansas
- Airports in Arkansas
- Alta Louisiana, 1762–1800
- Amusement parks in Arkansas
- AR – United States Postal Service postal code for the state of Arkansas
- Arboreta in Arkansas
  - commons:Category:Arboreta in Arkansas
- Archaeology in Arkansas
  - Category:Archaeological sites in Arkansas
    - commons:Category:Archaeological sites in Arkansas
- Architecture in Arkansas
- Arkansas website
  - Category:Arkansas
    - commons:Category:Arkansas
      - commons:Category:Maps of Arkansas
- Arkansas County, Arkansas
- Arkansas in the American Civil War, 1861–1865
- Arkansas Post, first territorial capital 1819-1821
- Arkansas Post, Arkansas, the unincorporated community near the historical settlement
- Arkansas Razorbacks and Arkansas Ladybacks
- Arkansas lunar sample displays
- Arkansas Register of Historic Places
- Arkansas River
- Arkansas State Capitol
- Arkansas State Police
- Arkansas Teacher Corps
- Arkansas–Texas League
- Art museums and galleries in Arkansas
  - commons:Category:Art museums and galleries in Arkansas
- Ashley County, Arkansas
- Astronomical observatories in Arkansas
  - commons:Category:Astronomical observatories in Arkansas
- Attorney General of the State of Arkansas

== B ==
- Battle of Arkansas Post (1863)
- Battle of Bayou Fourche
- Battle of Bayou Meto
- Battle of Brownsville, Arkansas
- Battle of Cane Hill
- Battle of Chalk Bluff
- Battle of Cotton Plant
- Battle of Devil's Backbone
- Battle of Elkin's Ferry
- Battle of Fayetteville (1863)
- Battle of Fort Smith
- Battle of Helena
- Battle of Jenkins' Ferry
- Battle of Marks' Mills
- Battle of Massard Prairie
- Battle of Mount Elba
- Battle of Old River Lake
- Battle of Pea Ridge
- Battle of Pine Bluff
- Battle of Poison Spring
- Battle of Prairie D'Ane
- Battle of Prairie Grove
- Battle of Saint Charles
- Battle of Van Buren
- Battle of Whitney's Lane
- Baxter County, Arkansas
- Benton County, Arkansas
- Bentonville, Arkansas
- Bono, Arkansas
- Boone County, Arkansas
- Botanical gardens in Arkansas
  - commons:Category:Botanical gardens in Arkansas
- Bradley County, Arkansas
- Buildings and structures in Arkansas
  - commons:Category:Buildings and structures in Arkansas

== C ==
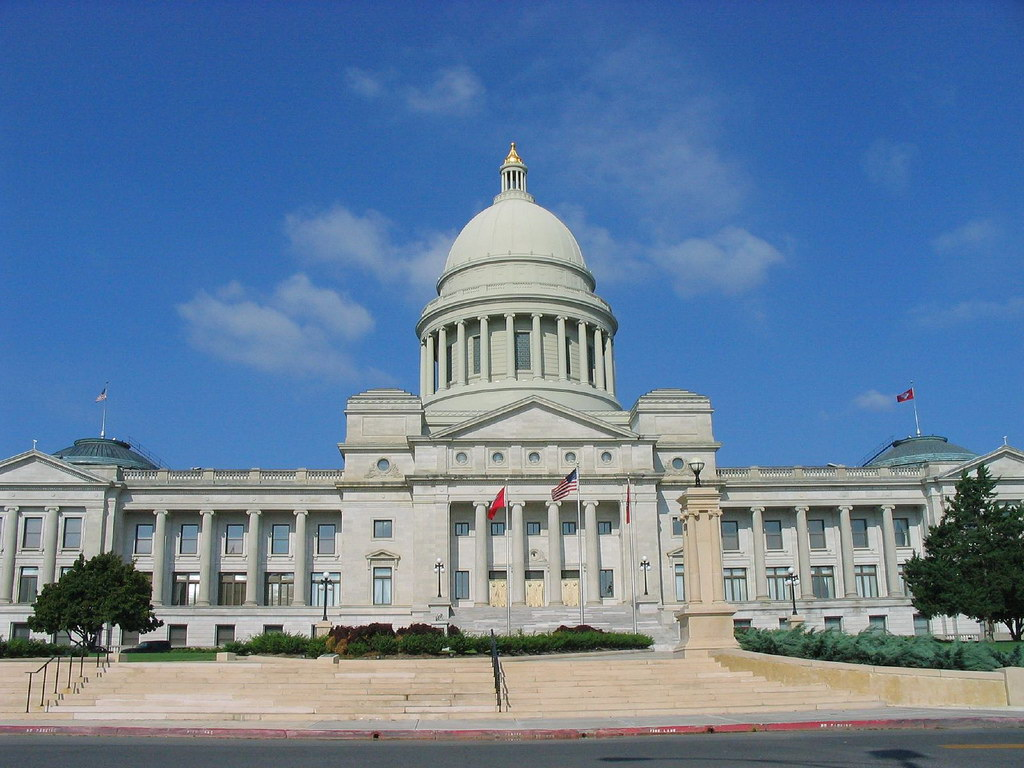
The Arkansas State Capitol in Little Rock

- Calhoun County, Arkansas
- Capital of the State of Arkansas
- Capital punishment in Arkansas
- Capitol of the State of Arkansas
  - commons:Category:Arkansas State Capitol
- Carroll County, Arkansas
- Caves of Arkansas
  - commons:Category:Caves of Arkansas
- Census statistical areas of Arkansas
- Cherokee in Arkansas
- Chicot County, Arkansas
- Cities in Arkansas
  - commons:Category:Cities in Arkansas
- Clark County, Arkansas
- Clay County, Arkansas
- Cleburne County, Arkansas
- Cleveland County, Arkansas
- Climate of Arkansas
- Climate change in Arkansas
- Colleges and universities in Arkansas
  - commons:Category:Universities and colleges in Arkansas
- Columbia County, Arkansas
- Communications in Arkansas
  - commons:Category:Communications in Arkansas

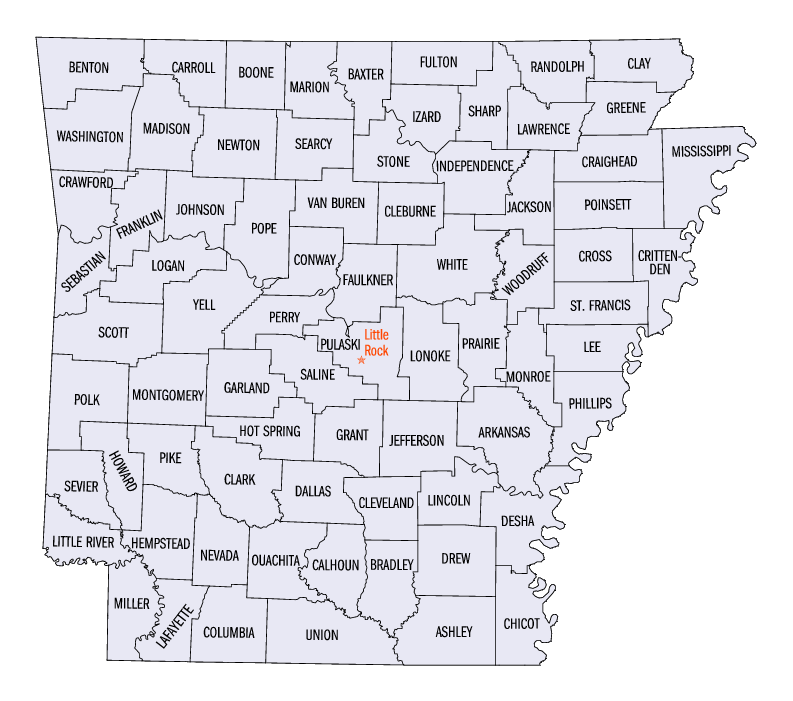
An enlargeable map of the 75 counties of the state of Arkansas

- Companies in Arkansas
  - Category:Companies based in Arkansas
- Congressional districts of Arkansas
- Constitution of the State of Arkansas
- Convention centers in Arkansas
  - commons:Category:Convention centers in Arkansas
- Conway County, Arkansas
- Conway, Arkansas
- Counties of the state of Arkansas
  - commons:Category:Counties in Arkansas
- Craighead County, Arkansas
- Crawford County, Arkansas
- Crittenden County, Arkansas
- Cross County, Arkansas
- Culture of Arkansas
  - commons:Category:Arkansas culture

== D ==
- Dallas County, Arkansas
- Demographics of Arkansas
- Desha County, Arkansas
- District of Louisiana, 1804–1805
- Drew County, Arkansas

== E ==
- Economy of Arkansas
  - Category:Economy of Arkansas
    - commons:Category:Economy of Arkansas
- Education in Arkansas
  - Category:Education in Arkansas
    - commons:Category:Education in Arkansas
- Elections of the state of Arkansas
  - commons:Category:Elections in Arkansas
- Environment of Arkansas
  - commons:Category:Environment of Arkansas

== F ==
The Flag of the State of Arkansas

- Faulkner County, Arkansas
- Fayetteville, Arkansas
- Flag of the State of Arkansas
- Forts in Arkansas
  - Category:Forts in Arkansas
    - commons:Category:Forts in Arkansas
- Fort Smith, Arkansas
- Franklin County, Arkansas
- Fulton County, Arkansas

== G ==
The Great Seal of the State of Arkansas

- Garland County, Arkansas
- Geography of Arkansas
  - Category:Geography of Arkansas
    - commons:Category:Geography of Arkansas
- Geology of Arkansas
  - commons:Category:Geology of Arkansas
- Ghost towns in Arkansas
  - Category:Ghost towns in Arkansas
    - commons:Category:Ghost towns in Arkansas
- Golf clubs and courses in Arkansas
- Goobertown, Arkansas
- Government of the state of Arkansas website
  - Category:Government of Arkansas
    - commons:Category:Government of Arkansas
- Governor of the State of Arkansas
  - List of governors of Arkansas
- Grant County, Arkansas
- Great Seal of the State of Arkansas
- Greene County, Arkansas
- Gun laws in Arkansas

== H ==
- Harrison, Arkansas
- Hempstead County, Arkansas
- Herbine, Arkansas
- Heritage railroads in Arkansas
  - commons:Category:Heritage railroads in Arkansas
- High schools of Arkansas
- Higher education in Arkansas
- Hiking trails in Arkansas
  - commons:Category:Hiking trails in Arkansas
- History of Arkansas
  - Historical outline of Arkansas
    - Category:History of Arkansas
      - commons:Category:History of Arkansas
- Hospitals in Arkansas
- Hot Spring County, Arkansas
- Hot Springs, Arkansas
- Hot springs of Arkansas
  - commons:Category:Hot springs of Arkansas
- House of Representatives of the State of Arkansas
- Howard County, Arkansas

== I ==
- Images of Arkansas
  - commons:Category:Arkansas
- Independence County, Arkansas
- Ivory-billed woodpecker, long thought extinct, possibly re-discovered in the Big Woods of Arkansas
- Islands in Arkansas
- Izard County, Arkansas

== J ==
- Jackson County, Arkansas
- Jefferson County, Arkansas
- Johnson County, Arkansas
- Jonesboro, Arkansas

== K ==
- Kavanaugh, William Marmaduke
- Kirby, William

== L ==
- Lafayette County, Arkansas
- La Haute-Louisiane, 1800–1803
- La Louisiane, 1699–1762
- Lakes in Arkansas
  - Category:Lakes of Arkansas
    - commons:Category:Lakes of Arkansas
- Landmarks in Arkansas
  - commons:Category:Landmarks in Arkansas
- Lawrence County, Arkansas
- Lee County, Arkansas
- Lieutenant Governor of the State of Arkansas
- Lincoln County, Arkansas
- Lists related to the state of Arkansas:
  - List of airports in Arkansas
  - List of census statistical areas in Arkansas
  - List of cities in Arkansas
  - List of colleges and universities in Arkansas
  - List of companies in Arkansas
  - List of United States congressional districts in Arkansas
  - List of counties in Arkansas
  - List of individuals executed in Arkansas
  - List of forts in Arkansas
  - List of ghost towns in Arkansas
  - List of governors of Arkansas
  - List of high schools in Arkansas
  - List of highways in Arkansas
  - List of hospitals in Arkansas
  - List of islands in Arkansas
  - List of lakes in Arkansas
  - List of law enforcement agencies in Arkansas
  - List of lieutenant governors of Arkansas
  - List of museums in Arkansas
  - List of National Historic Landmarks in Arkansas
  - List of native plants of Arkansas
  - List of people from Arkansas
  - List of places in Arkansas
  - List of radio stations in Arkansas
  - List of railroads in Arkansas
  - List of Registered Historic Places in Arkansas
  - List of rivers of Arkansas
  - List of school districts in Arkansas
  - List of snakes in Arkansas
  - List of state forests in Arkansas
  - List of state highway routes in Arkansas
  - List of state parks in Arkansas
  - List of state prisons in Arkansas
  - List of state symbols of Arkansas
  - List of television stations in Arkansas
  - List of Arkansas's congressional delegations
  - List of United States congressional districts in Arkansas
  - List of United States representatives from Arkansas
  - List of United States senators from Arkansas
- Literature of Arkansas
- Little River County, Arkansas
- Little Rock, Arkansas, territorial and state capital since 1821
- Little Rock Nine, 1957
- Logan County, Arkansas
- Lonoke County, Arkansas
- Louisiana Purchase of 1803

== M ==
- Madison County, Arkansas
- Main Street Arkansas
- Maps of Arkansas
- Marion County, Arkansas
- Miller County, Arkansas
- Mississippi County, Arkansas
- Mississippi River
- Monroe County, Arkansas
- Montgomery County, Arkansas
- Mountains of Arkansas
  - commons:Category:Mountains of Arkansas
- Museums in Arkansas
  - Category:Museums in Arkansas
    - commons:Category:Museums in Arkansas
- Music of Arkansas
  - Category:Music of Arkansas
    - commons:Category:Music of Arkansas
  - Category:Musical groups from Arkansas
  - Category:Musicians from Arkansas

== N ==
- National forests of Arkansas
  - commons:Category:National Forests of Arkansas
- Native plants of Arkansas
- Natural history of Arkansas
  - commons:Category:Natural history of Arkansas
- Nevada County, Arkansas
- News media in Arkansas
- Newspapers of Arkansas
- Newton County, Arkansas

== O ==
- Ouachita County, Arkansas
- Outdoor sculptures in Arkansas
  - commons:Category:Outdoor sculptures in Arkansas
- Ozark Southern Stone quarry

== P ==
- Paragould, Arkansas
- People from Arkansas
  - Category:People from Arkansas
    - commons:Category:People from Arkansas
    - Category:People from Arkansas by populated place
    - Category:People from Arkansas by county
    - Category:People from Arkansas by occupation
- Perry County, Arkansas
- Phillips County, Arkansas
- Pike County, Arkansas
- Places in Arkansas
- Poinsett County, Arkansas
- Politics of Arkansas
  - commons:Category:Politics of Arkansas
- Polk County, Arkansas
- Pope County, Arkansas
- Prairie County, Arkansas
- Protected areas of Arkansas
  - commons:Category:Protected areas of Arkansas
- Pulaski County, Arkansas

== Q ==
- Quarles, Donald
- Quarles, Greenfield

== R ==
- Radio stations in Arkansas
- Railroad museums in Arkansas
  - commons:Category:Railroad museums in Arkansas
- Railroads in Arkansas
- Randolph County, Arkansas
- Registered historic places in Arkansas
  - commons:Category:Registered Historic Places in Arkansas
- Religion in Arkansas
  - Category:Religion in Arkansas
    - commons:Category:Religion in Arkansas
- Rivers of Arkansas
  - commons:Category:Rivers of Arkansas
- Rogers, Arkansas
- Roller coasters in Arkansas
  - commons:Category:Roller coasters in Arkansas

== S ==
- Saline County, Arkansas
- Same-sex marriage in Arkansas
- School districts of Arkansas
- Scott County, Arkansas
- Scouting in Arkansas
- Searcy County, Arkansas
- Sebastian County, Arkansas
- Senate of the State of Arkansas
- Settlements in Arkansas
  - Cities in Arkansas
  - Towns in Arkansas
  - Census Designated Places in Arkansas
  - Other unincorporated communities in Arkansas
  - List of ghost towns in Arkansas
  - List of places in Arkansas
- Sevier County, Arkansas
- Sharp County, Arkansas
- Skirmish at Aberdeen
- Skirmish at Terre Noire Creek
- Skirmish at Threkeld's Ferry
- South Arkansas
- Sports in Arkansas
  - commons:Category:Sports in Arkansas
- Sports venues in Arkansas
  - commons:Category:Sports venues in Arkansas
- State Capitol of Arkansas
- State highway routes in Arkansas
- State of Arkansas website
  - Constitution of the State of Arkansas
  - Government of the state of Arkansas
    - Category:Government of Arkansas
      - commons:Category:Government of Arkansas
  - Executive branch of the government of the state of Arkansas
    - Governor of the State of Arkansas
  - Legislative branch of the government of the state of Arkansas
    - General Assembly of the State of Arkansas
      - Senate of the State of Arkansas
      - House of Representatives of the State of Arkansas
  - Judicial branch of the government of the state of Arkansas
    - Supreme Court of the State of Arkansas
    - Arkansas Court of Appeals
- State parks of Arkansas
  - commons:Category:State parks of Arkansas
- State Police of Arkansas
- State prisons of Arkansas
- St. Francis County, Arkansas
- Stone County, Arkansas
- Structures in Arkansas
  - commons:Category:Buildings and structures in Arkansas
- Superfund sites in Arkansas
- Supreme Court of the State of Arkansas
- Symbols of the state of Arkansas
  - Category:Symbols of Arkansas
    - commons:Category:Symbols of Arkansas

== T ==
- Telecommunications in Arkansas
  - commons:Category:Communications in Arkansas
- Telephone area codes in Arkansas
- Television shows set in Arkansas
- Television stations in Arkansas
- Territory of Arkansas, 1819–1836
- Territory of Louisiana, 1805–1812
- Territory of Missouri, (1812–1819)-1821
- Theatres in Arkansas
  - commons:Category:Theatres in Arkansas
- Third Treaty of San Ildefonso of 1800
- Tourism in Arkansas website
  - commons:Category:Tourism in Arkansas
- Trail of Tears, 1830–1838
- Transportation in Arkansas
  - Category:Transportation in Arkansas
    - commons:Category:Transport in Arkansas
- Treaty of Fontainebleau of 1762

== U ==
- Union County, Arkansas
- United States of America
  - States of the United States of America
  - United States census statistical areas of Arkansas
  - Arkansas's congressional delegations
  - United States congressional districts in Arkansas
  - United States Court of Appeals for the Eighth Circuit
  - United States District Court for the Eastern District of Arkansas
  - United States District Court for the Western District of Arkansas
  - United States representatives from Arkansas
  - United States senators from Arkansas
- Universities and colleges in Arkansas
  - commons:Category:Universities and colleges in Arkansas
- US-AR – ISO 3166-2:US region code for the state of Arkansas

== V ==
- Van Buren County, Arkansas

== W ==
- Washington County, Arkansas
- Water parks in Arkansas
  Wikimedia
  - Wikimedia Commons:Category:Arkansas
    - commons:Category:Maps of Arkansas
  - Wikinews:Category:Arkansas
    - Wikinews:Portal:Arkansas
  - Wikipedia Category:Arkansas
    - Wikipedia Portal:Arkansas
    - Wikipedia:WikiProject Arkansas
      - Category:WikiProject Arkansas articles
      - Category:WikiProject Arkansas participants
- Weiner, Arkansas
- White County, Arkansas
- Woodruff County, Arkansas

== Y ==
- Yell County, Arkansas
- Henry Clay Yerger

== Z ==
- Zoos in Arkansas
  - commons:Category:Zoos in Arkansas

== See also ==
- Topic overview:
  - Arkansas
  - Outline of Arkansas
- Arkansas Skywarn weather
