= 2026 in Arkansas =

- Decades: 2000s; 2010s; 2020s
- See also: History of Arkansas; Historical outline of Arkansas; List of years in Arkansas; 2026 in the United States

The following is a list of events of the year 2026 in Arkansas.

== Incumbents ==
=== State government ===
- Governor: Sarah Huckabee Sanders (R)

== Events ==
- March 3 – 2026 Arkansas Senate election: Primary races are held. Incumbent Tom Cotton wins in the Republican primary, while Hallie Shoffner wins the Democratic primary.
- August 1 – State Representative Austin McCollum (R–Benton County) is arrested and charged with domestic battery.
- November 3 – 2026 Arkansas elections:
  - 2026 Arkansas House of Representatives election
  - 2026 Arkansas Senate election
  - 2026 Arkansas Commissioner of State Lands election
  - 2026 Arkansas gubernatorial election: Sarah Huckabee Sanders wins reelection.
  - 2026 Arkansas Secretary of State election
- November 5 – Nancie Givens, the former director of the Arkansas Supreme Court's Office of Professional Programs, is arrested and charged with tampering with public records. Givens is accused of manipulating the scores of bar exams, causing some people who passed to fail and vice versa.

== See also ==
- 2025 in the United States
