= 1954 in Arkansas =

- Decades: 1930s; 1940s; 1950s; 1960s; 1970s
- See also: History of Arkansas; Historical outline of Arkansas; List of years in Arkansas; 1954 in the United States

Events from the year 1954 in Arkansas.

== Incumbents ==
=== State government ===
- Governor: Francis Cherry (D)

== Events ==
- April 15 - The KARK‑TV Channel 4 in Little Rock (NBC affiliate) begins broadcasting
- June 8 - Isadore Banks is Lynched in Marion County.
- August 23 - In Charleston, Arkansas (Franklin County) the school district became the first in Arkansas to integrate African - Americans.
- November 2 - Orval Faubus is elected governor of Arkansas.
