= 2023 in Arkansas =

- Decades: 2000s; 2010s; 2020s
- See also: History of Arkansas; Historical outline of Arkansas; List of years in Arkansas; 2023 in the United States

The following is a list of events of the year 2023 in Arkansas.

== Incumbents ==
=== State government ===
- Governor: Asa Hutchinson (R) (until January 10), Sarah Huckabee Sanders (R) (starting January 10)

== Events ==
- February 22 – Five people are killed when a Beechcraft BE20 crashes shortly after takeoff near College Station, Little Rock.
- March 31 – A large tornado causes major damage to the Little Rock metropolitan area, killing at least three people and injuring 24 others.
- April 2 – Former Arkansas Governor Asa Hutchinson announces his campaign for the 2024 United States presidential election during an interview with ABC News.
- June 29 – Smoke from the ongoing Canadian wildfires is reported to have entered several states, including Arkansas.

== See also ==
- 2023 in the United States
