= 2022 in Arkansas =

- Decades: 2000s; 2010s; 2020s
- See also: History of Arkansas; Historical outline of Arkansas; List of years in Arkansas; 2022 in the United States

The following is a list of events of the year 2022 in Arkansas.

== Incumbents ==
=== State government ===
- Governor: Asa Hutchinson (R)

== Events ==
- March 29 – Tornado outbreak of March 29–31, 2022: An EF3 tornado was confirmed in Springdale.
- August 21 – Arrest of Randal Worcester
- November 8 – 2022 Arkansas elections

== See also ==
- 2022 in the United States
