= 2025 in Arkansas =

- Decades: 2000s; 2010s; 2020s
- See also: History of Arkansas; Historical outline of Arkansas; List of years in Arkansas; 2025 in the United States

The following is a list of events of the year 2025 in Arkansas.

== Incumbents ==
=== State government ===
- Governor: Sarah Huckabee Sanders (R)

== Events ==
- February 27 – A legislative panel voted 10-5 to grant approval to a Bill that would allow the state to execute criminals by nitrogen hypoxia, a method first used by Alabama in 2024, and it advanced to the House for further review.
- March 3 – Severe thunderstorms and tornado watches are issued across Southern Arkansas.
- March 4 – The Arkansas House of Representatives votes by a majority vote of 67-23 for the nitrogen hypoxia death penalty method bill.
- March 11 – The Arkansas Senate votes by a majority vote of 26-9 for the nitrogen hypoxia death penalty method bill.
- March 18 – The Arkansas governor Sarah Huckabee Sanders signs the nitrogen hypoxia death penalty bill into law. Arkansas becomes the fifth state in the US joining Alabama, Oklahoma Mississippi and Louisiana to allow executions by nitrogen hypoxia.
- April – The Arkansas governor Sarah Huckabee Sanders signs into law a bill that mandates the display of the Ten Commandments and In God We Trust in Arkansas classrooms.
- May 25 – Grant Hardin, a former Gateway Police chief and convicted murderer and rapist known as "The Devil in the Ozarks", escapes from the North Central Unit in Calico Rock. Surveillance footage shows Hardin walking out of the prison dressed in a guard's uniform.
- June 6 – Grant Hardin is recaptured by law enforcement about 1.5 miles away from the North Central Unit.
- June 30 – Helena–West Helena Mayor Christopher Franklin is removed from office days after his arrest for failing to pay his taxes.
- July 26 – Two hikers are fatally stabbed in Devil's Den State Park in front of their daughters. A suspect is arrested five days later.
- September 9 – Governor Sanders announces National Guardsmen will be sent to several cities in Arkansas to assist ICE. 18 are sent to Little Rock and ten each are sent to Fayetteville and Fort Smith.
- December 24 – A $1.8 billion Powerball ticket is sold at a Cabot gas station.

== See also ==
- 2025 in the United States
