= 2021 in Arkansas =

- Decades: 2000s; 2010s; 2020s
- See also: History of Arkansas; Historical outline of Arkansas; List of years in Arkansas; 2021 in the United States

The following is a list of events of the year 2021 in Arkansas.

== Incumbents ==
=== State government ===
- Governor: Asa Hutchinson (R)

== Events ==
Ongoing: COVID-19 pandemic in Arkansas

- April 6 – Arkansas becomes the first U.S. state to ban transitional care for transgender minors after the Legislature overrides Governor Asa Hutchinson's veto of the bill.
- July 29 – Asa Hutchinson declares a public health emergency in Arkansas amid an increase in the number of COVID-19 cases. He also announces a special legislative session to change the law that prevents public schools from issuing mask mandates.
- August 6 – An Arkansas judge temporarily blocks a law signed by Governor Asa Hutchinson that bans the state from imposing mask mandates.

== See also ==
- 2021 in the United States
