= 2024 in Arkansas =

- Decades: 2000s; 2010s; 2020s
- See also: History of Arkansas; Historical outline of Arkansas; List of years in Arkansas; 2024 in the United States

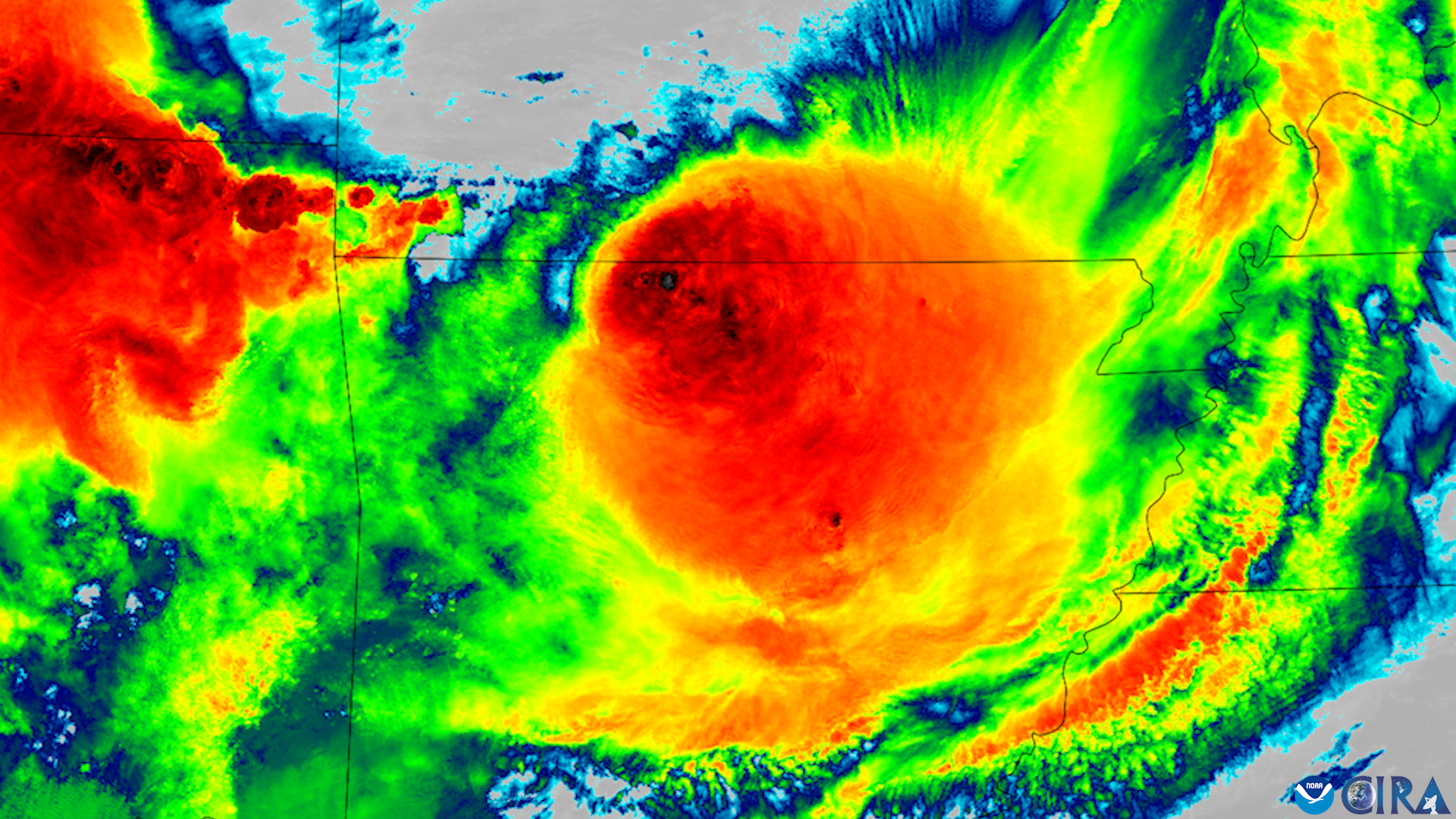
Heavy downpours from thunderstorms in Arkansas and Missouri early this morning created flash flooding conditions in the two states in July, 2024.

The following is a list of events of the year 2024 in Arkansas.

== Incumbents ==
=== State government ===
- Governor: Sarah Huckabee Sanders (R)

== Events ==
- January 16 – Former governor of Arkansas Asa Hutchinson withdraws from the 2024 Republican Party presidential primaries.
- March 5 – Super Tuesday:
  - The Democratic Party holds presidential nominating contests in Arkansas amongst other states.
  - The Republican Party holds presidential nominating contests in Arkansas amongst other states.
- May 8 – A statue of the late African American civil rights leader Daisy Bates is unveiled at the U.S. Capitol's National Statuary Hall Collection in Washington, D.C., representing the state of Arkansas.
- May 25–27: Tornado outbreak of May 25–27, 2024
- June 21 – 2024 Fordyce shooting: Four people are killed and ten others are wounded in a shooting at the Mad Butcher supermarket in Fordyce. The suspect, Travis Eugene Posey, is shot and arrested by Arkansas State Police.

== See also ==
- 2024 in the United States
