= 1836 in Arkansas =

- Decades: 1810s; 1820s; 1830s; 1840s; 1850s
- See also: History of Arkansas; Historical outline of Arkansas; List of years in Arkansas; 1836 in the United States

The following is a list of events of the year 1836 in Arkansas.

== Incumbents ==
=== State government ===
- Governor: James Sevier Conway (D) (starting September 13)

== Events ==
- June 15 – The Arkansas Territory is admitted to the union of the United States as the 25th U.S. state.
- September 13 – James Sevier Conway wins the 1836 Arkansas gubernatorial election, becoming the first governor of Arkansas.

== See also ==
- 1836 in the United States
