= 54th Illinois Infantry Regiment =

Infantry regiment in the Union Army during the Civil War

54th Regiment Illinois Volunteer Infantry
- Illinois state flag
- Active: February, 1862 to October 15, 1865
- Country: United States
- Allegiance: Union
- Branch: Infantry
- Engagements: Siege of Vicksburg; Operations against Vicksburg; Charleston Riot; Action at Ashley's Station

The 54th Regiment Illinois Volunteer Infantry was an infantry regiment that served in the Union Army during the American Civil War.

== Service ==
The 54th Illinois Infantry was organized at Anna, Illinois in November 1861 by Colonel Thomas W. Harris. Originally designated as a part of the "Kentucky Brigade" and mustered into Federal service in February, 1862.

Shortly after muster, the regiment moved to Cairo, Illinois and then to Columbus, Kentucky, where they conducted garrison duty until December 1862. During this Period, the regiment suffered the loss of nearly all of its records when Confederate General Nathan Bedford Forrest captured various detachments and the regimental's quartermaster's baggage in transit.

=== Vicksburg and Arkansas Campaigns ===
In May 1863, the 54th Illinois was ordered to join operations against Vicksburg, Mississippi. Attached to Kimball's Provisional Division of XVI Corps.The regiment served on the "Exterior Line" at Haynes Bluff and the Big Black River to prevent Confederate reinforcements from reaching the besieged city.

Following the fall of Vicksburg, the regiment was transferred to Frederick Steele's expedition against Little Rock, Arkansas. It participated in the capture of the city on September 10, 1863, and remained there in the Department of Arkansas for the duration of the war.

=== The Charleston Riot ===
In early 1864, three-fourths of the regiment re-enlisted as 'veteran volunteers'. While the men were returning to Illinois for a veteran furlough on March 28, 1864, a violent confrontation took place in Charleston, Illinois. An organized group of 'Copperheads" (Confederate sympathizers) attacked members of the regiment. The riot resulted in the deaths of Major Shubal York, the regimental surgeon, and four privates, while Colonel Greenville M. Mitchell was wounded.

=== Shelby's Raid ===
After returning to the front in April 1864, the regiment was assigned to guard the Memphis and Little Rock Railroad. On August 24, 1864, the regiment was attacked by a Confederate force of 4,000 men under General Joseph O. Shelby.

Six Companies of the 54th Illinois concentrated at Ashley Station and defended their position for five hours behind breastworks made of hay, they hay would eventually caught fire from Confederate artillery shells, forcing Union troops of evacuate; they were subsequently captured. The regiment was exchanged on December 5, 1864, and returned to duty in January 1865.

The regiment spent the final months of the war on railroad guard duty and garrisoning posts and Pine Bluffs and Fort Smith, Arkansas. The 54th Illinois was mustered out on October 15, 1865.

== Total strength and casualties ==
The regiment suffered 1 officer and 11 enlisted men who were killed in action or mortally wounded and 2 officers and 171 enlisted men who died of disease, for a total of 185 fatalities.

== Commanders ==
- Colonel Thomas W. Harris - resigned on December 10, 1862.
- Colonel Greenville McNeel Mitchell - mustered out with the regiment.

== See also ==
- List of Illinois Civil War Units
- Illinois in the American Civil War
