= Main Street Arkansas =

Main Street Arkansas is a program for downtown revitalization in Arkansas. It is a program of the Arkansas Historic Preservation Program, an agency of the Department of Arkansas Heritage. Main Street Arkansas works through the 4-Point approach to downtown revitalization - Design, Organization, Promotion and Economic Restructuring. This format is trademarked by the National Trust for Historic Preservation's Main Street Center, which was founded in 1980.
