= Arkansas Teacher Corps =

American non-profit organization

The Arkansas Teacher Corps (ATC) is an American non-profit organization established in 2013 whose vision is for "all Arkansan students will have extraordinary lives through exceptional education." ATC recruits, trains, and supports new teachers to serve in impoverished communities in the state of Arkansas for a three-year period.

== Function ==
The program is based on the larger national Teach for America program. The program recruits "the highest achieving" college graduates from any major or field, and those selected as ATC fellows receive six weeks of pedagogic instruction, they work towards completing all requirements for a standard teaching license, and are paid $15,000 for completion of the three-year program (in addition to their teacher salaries).

ATC fellows are serving in high-needs schools throughout the state of Arkansas, and the program places fellows based on need. Most fellows are placed in classrooms in central and southern Arkansas. In 2013–2014, ATC fellows were placed in Clarendon, Dermott, Forrest City, Hope, KIPP Delta, Premier Little Rock, Prescott, Pulaski County, and Quest Pine Bluff, for example.

== Early history ==
An earlier organization by the same name, funded by the United States Office of Education and approved by the Arkansas State Department of Education, operated in the 1960s in Arkansas. The earlier program was noted as having found some success, "for all its troubles".

As early as 1987, the Arkansas Code noted anew the intent for an "Arkansas Teacher Corps to increase the number of new and certified teachers".

== Supporters ==
Funding for ATC has been provided through a collaboration between the College of Education and Health Professions at the University of Arkansas, the Walton Family Foundation, the Winthrop Rockefeller Foundation, and the Women's Giving Circle. The program is also supported by individual donors through the Arkansas Teacher Corps Society.

== Impact ==
Since its 2013 inception, three ATC fellows have been named "Teacher of the Year" at their districts.

Bobby Hart, the superintendent of Hope Public Schools stated, "Having Arkansas Teacher Corps Fellows in our schools has been a tremendous shot in the arm for us." Robert Poole, superintendent of the Prescott School District, said, "This teacher hasn't been a teacher for very long, but she has the passion that it takes to produce top-notch citizens of this community. We are very proud of her," of another ATC fellow.
