= Henry Clay Yerger =

American schoolteacher

- Born: December 4, 1861; Hempstead County, Arkansas, C.S.
- Died: February 19, 1936 (aged 74); Hope, Arkansas, U.S.
- Resting place: Cave Hill Cemetery No. 1, Hope, Arkansas, U.S. 33°40′43.0″N 93°35′26.2″W
- Education: Philander Smith College
- Occupation: Schoolteacher
- Known for: Shover Street School
- Spouse: Ella J. Green
- Children: 8

Henry Clay Yerger (December 4, 1861 – February 19, 1936) was an American schoolteacher who pioneered African-American education at Hope, Arkansas.

== Early life and education ==
Henry Clay Yerger was born on December 4, 1861, in Hempstead County, Arkansas, to Sally Yerger. He obtained his education at Philander Smith College. He also studied at Boston University and the Hampton Institute. He married Miss Ella J. Green and to this union eight children were born, five boys and three girls.

== Shover Street School ==
Yerger came to Hope and took charge of the Hope Colored School on October 1, 1886, in a one-room building. This building was located on South Hazel Street between Fourth and Fifth Streets. A few years later, the site was moved to Shover Road, now Shover Street; hence, the name "Shover Street Elementary School". At this new location, there were two rooms and two teachers. The school was destined to grow under the leadership of Professor Yerger with his long-range planning and farsightedness, the hearty cooperation of the school board and the confidence of the people.

In a short while, the building consisted of four rooms and four teachers. In 1915, a second story was built and three teachers were added. An annex for domestic science was added to the seven-room elementary building with funds secured from the Jeans and Sister Funds, later the Rosenwald Fund and General Education Board. Later, an agricultural department was established through the assistance of the Smith-Hughes Fund and a building was added for that purpose.

The school had grown steadily; it had become the first training school for Negros west of the Mississippi River and subjects were taught through the eleventh grade. Subjects included English, algebra, geometry, Latin, agriculture, social science, art, teacher training and choral music. The teachers served in whatever capacities they could other than regular classroom work; therefore, dramatics, dancing, some physical education and other activities were not neglected.

Shover Street School was the only high school in this section of the state for a long time. Many students went there for their education. That caused something to be done in connection with a high school; aid was sought for the building of a dormitory for girls. In 1918, this became a reality. In 1918 was built a dormitory for out-of-town teachers and students who came from adjoining states for training as teachers. He received financial help from the General Education Board, the Rosenwald Foundation, and from Smith Hughes and Slater Funds in establishing courses in home economics and agriculture. In 1928, the twelfth graders were added. In 1931, the school board purchased five adjourning acres for additional building and a park, and with the assistance of the Rosenwald Foundation and the General Education Board, the first permanent building was erected. It was named Henry Clay Yerger High School in October 1931 in honor of its founder and principal, who had given fifty years of dedicated service. At this time the school had an enrollment of over nine hundred students and a faculty of seventeen teachers. The school received an "A" rating from the State Department of Education.

Later came additions of a new high school annex, a lunchroom, Adult Education and Veterans Program, a vocational building and Shover Street Elementary. Subjects included in the high school were English, Mathematics, Natural Science, Social Studies, Trade and industry, Guidance, Commercial and Music. In recent years, a gymnasium, a new high annex, a new lunchroom had been added. Additional subjects were speech, foreign language and remedial reading. In 1958, the school was admitted to the North Central Association of Colleges and Secondary Schools.

== Personal life ==
Yerger received the Outstanding Citizen Award for community education and religious services. He served as president, treasurer, and board member of the Arkansas Teachers Association.

== Sources ==
- Centennial Executive Committee; A commemorative History of Hope. Hope, Arkansas, 1975.
