= List of Arkansas state symbols =

Location of the state of Arkansas in the United States

The state of Arkansas has numerous symbols.

Though two other songs are designated as "state songs" (plus a "state historical song" which was the state song from 1949 to 1963), by state law, the secretary of state must respond to any requests for "the state song" with the music of the state anthem, "Arkansas", which was the state song before 1949 and from 1963 to 1987, when it became state anthem and the other songs gained their present status. This is strictly to preserve the status of "Arkansas"; all four songs are either copyrighted by the state itself or in the public domain. The oldest symbol is the apple blossom, designated in 1901. The most recently designated symbol is the Cotton Belt 898, designated in 2021.

== Insignia ==
Type	Symbol	Year	Image	Source
Flag	The Flag of Arkansas		Arkansas flag	
Seal	The Great Seal of the State of Arkansas		Arkansas seal	
Anthem	"Arkansas" by Eva Ware Barnett	1987	—	
Historical song	"The Arkansas Traveler" by Sandford C. Faulkner	1987	Arkansas seal	
Motto	Regnat Populus "The People Rule"	1907	—	
Nickname	"The Natural State"	1953		
Language	English	1987		
Song	"Arkansas (You Run Deep in Me)" by Wayland Holyfield	1987	—	
Song	"Oh, Arkansas" by Terry Rose and Gary Klass	1987	—	

== Animals ==
Type	Symbol	Year	Image
Bird	Mockingbird; Mimus polyglottos	1929	Mockingbird
Butterfly	Diana fritillary butterfly Speyeria diana	2007	Diana fritillary
Dinosaur	Arkansaurus Fridayi	2019	Diana fritillary
Insect	Honey bee Apis mellifera	1973	Honey bee
Mammal	White-tailed deer Odocoileus virginianus	1993	White-tailed deer
Primitive fish	Alligator gar Atractosteus spatula	2019	Alligator gar

== Plants ==
Type	Symbol	Year	Image
Floral emblem	Apple blossom Pyrus malus	1901	Apple blossom
Fruit and vegetable	South Arkansas vine ripe pink tomato Solanum lycopersicum	1987	South Arkansas vine ripe pink tomato
Grain	Rice; Oryza sp.	2007	Rice
Grape	Cynthiana grape Vitis aestivalis	2009	Cynthiana grape
Nut	Pecan; Carya illinoinensis	2009	Pecan
Soil	Stuttgart soil series	1997	
Tree	Pine tree either Pinus taeda or Pinus echinata	1939	Loblolly pine

== Geology ==
Type	Symbol	Year	Image
Gem	Diamond	1967	Diamond
Mineral	Quartz	1967	Quartz
Rock	Bauxite	1967	Bauxite

== Culture ==
Type	Symbol	Year	Image
American folk dance	Square dance	1991	Square dance
Beverage	Milk	1985	Milk
Firearm	Shotgun	2019	
Historic cooking vessel	Dutch oven	2001	Dutch oven
Knife	Bowie knife	2019	
Musical instrument	Fiddle	1985	Fiddle
Northwest Purple Martin Capital	Fort Smith, Arkansas	1993	
Poultry Capital of the World	Springdale, Arkansas	2013	
Southeast Purple Martin Capital	Lake Village, Arkansas	1993	
Steam Locomotive	Cotton Belt 819	2021	
Trout Capital	Cotter, Arkansas	1993	

== Other ==
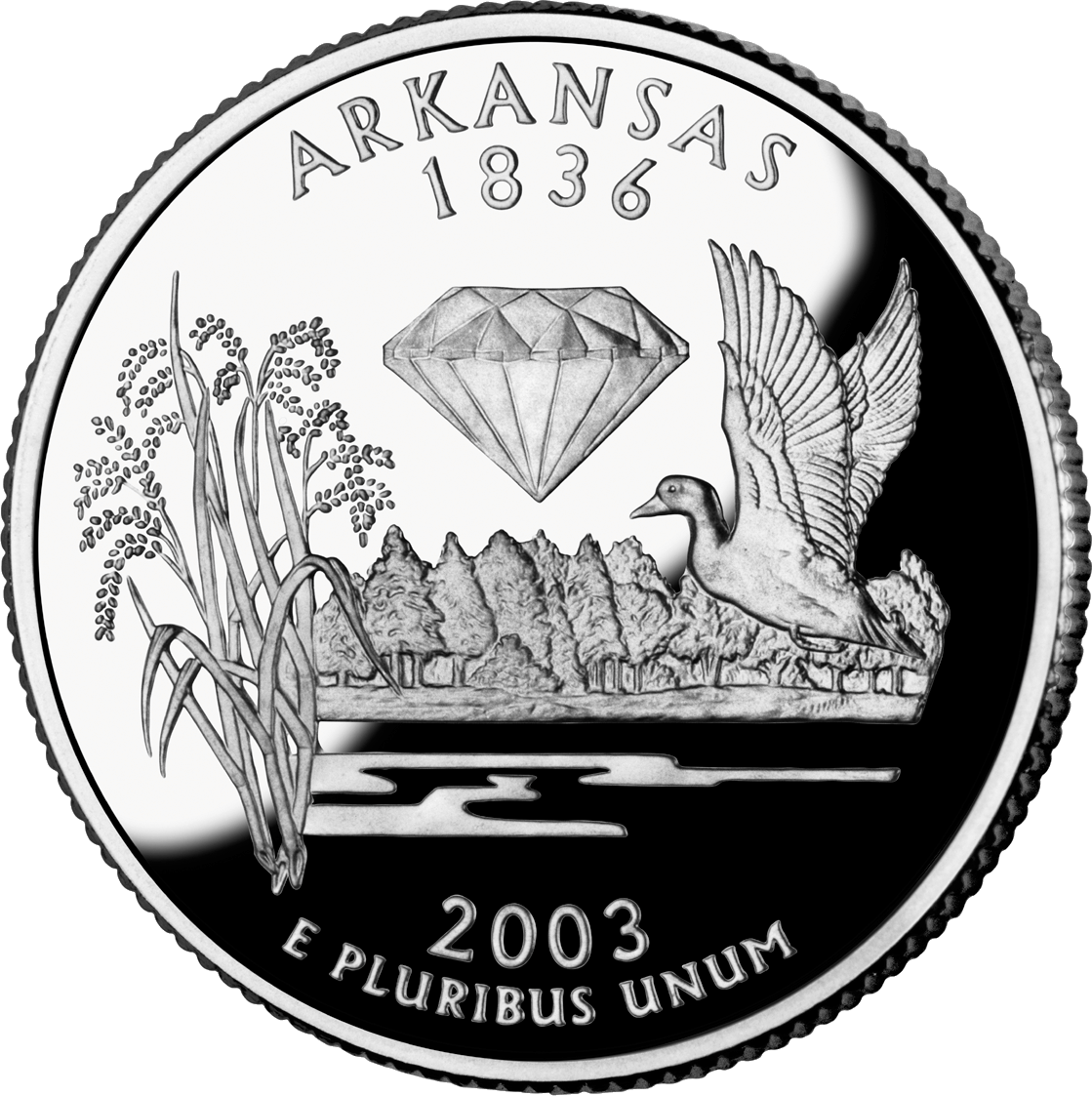
State quarter for Arkansas

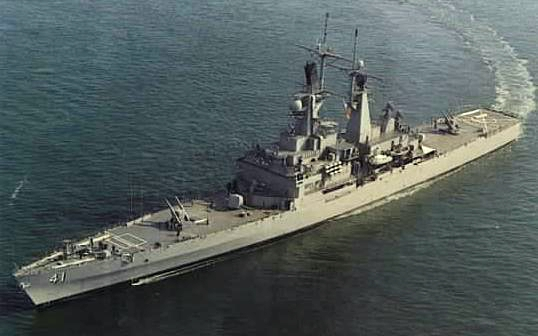
USS Arkansas (CGN-41)

== See also ==
- List of Arkansas-related topics
- Lists of United States state insignia
- State of Arkansas
