= 2026 Arkansas Commissioner of State Lands election =

- November 3, 2026
Candidate	Cole Jester	Chris Olson
Party	Republican	Libertarian
Popular vote	520,115	293,544
Percentage	63.9%	36.1%
- Jester: 50–60% 60–70% 70–80% 80–90% Olson: 50–60%
Commissioner before election
Tommy Land
Republican
Elected Commissioner
TBD

The 2026 Arkansas Commissioner of State Lands election was held on November 3, 2026, to elect the Arkansas Commissioner of State Lands. The primary election were held on March 3. Incumbent land commissioner Tommy Land was term-limited and ineligible to run for re-election to a third consecutive term.

== Republican primary ==
=== Candidates ===
==== Nominee ====
- Cole Jester, Secretary of State (2025–present)

==== Eliminated in primary ====
- Christian Olson, real estate investor

==== Withdrawn ====
- Lance Restum, Arkansas Travelers community outreach director (endorsed Jester)

=== Endorsements ===
Cole Jester

Statewide officials

- Sarah Huckabee Sanders, governor of Arkansas (2023–present)

=== Results ===
Republican primary
Party	Candidate	Votes	%
Republican	Cole Jester	193,683	72.2
Republican	Christian Olson	74,451	27.8
Total votes		268,134	100.0

Results by county Jester: 50–60%; 60–70%; 70–80%; 80–90%

== Third-party candidates ==
=== Libertarian Party ===
==== Nominee ====
- Chris Olson, mental healthcare worker and perennial candidate

== General election ==
=== Results ===
2026 Arkansas Commissioner of State Lands election
Party	Candidate	Votes	%	±%
Republican	Cole Jester	520,115	63.92	–4.85
Libertarian	Chris Olson	293,544	36.08	N/A
Total votes		813,659	100.00	
