= Ozark Southern Stone quarry =

Quarry in Arkansas, USA

Coordinates: 36°27′59″N 93°45′15″W

The Ozark Southern Stone quarry is a quarry located in Elk Ranch, Arkansas, rich in dolomite limestone.

It began in 1883 as Eureka Stone Co., and remained open until the Great Depression. It became Ozark Southern stone in 2006.

Its stone has been used in building in the northwest Arkansas region, in Kansas City, Missouri, and elsewhere. It was used in the restoration of the Old Main building at the campus of the University of Arkansas in Fayetteville, Arkansas.
