= Skirmish at Threlkeld's Ferry =

Battle of the American Civil War

Coordinates: 35.456°N 94.039°W

- Part of the American Civil War
Date	February 5, 1863
Location	Washington County, Arkansas, United States
Result	United States victory

Belligerents
United States	Confederate States

Commanders and leaders
(United States) James Stuart (Union colonel)	(Confederate States of America) Charles A. Carroll (Confederate colonel)

Units involved
1st Arkansas Cavalry Regiment (Union) detachment, 10th Illinois Cavalry Regiment	Carroll’s Cavalry Regiment

Casualties and losses
1 death from drowning, 1 captured	Several killed and wounded (exact number unreported), 7 captured

The Skirmish at Threlkeld's Ferry was an American Civil War engagement between Union Army and Confederate States Army cavalry detachments in northwest Arkansas on February 5, 1863 during a Union Army scout from Fayetteville, Arkansas to the Arkansas River. The skirmish resulted in a Union victory.
