= Action at Ashley's Station =

1864 battle of the American Civil War

Coordinates: 34.7826°N 91.7468°W

- Part of the American Civil War
Date	August 24, 1864
Location	Prairie County, Arkansas
Result	Confederate victory

Belligerents
United States	Confederate States

Commanders and leaders
(United States) Christopher Andrews; Greenville M. Mitchell; Washington F. Geiger	(Confederate States of America) Joseph O. Shelby

Units involved
54th Illinois Infantry Regiment; 1st Nebraska Cavalry Regiment	Shelby's Cavalry

Casualties and losses
977 killed, wounded and captured	173 killed and wounded

The action at Ashley's Station was fought between Confederate cavalry under Brigadier-General Joseph O. Shelby and the Union Army garrison under the command of Brigadier-General Christopher Andrews and Colonels Greenville M. Mitchell and Washington F. Geiger in Prairie County, Arkansas on August 24, 1864 during the American Civil War.

== Battle ==
Union Brigadier-General Christopher Andrews noticed about 2,250 horsemen advancing towards his station at White River. He assumed that they were a part of a routine Federal expedition. However, by the time he discovered that it was Shelby’s division, it was too late. Shelby was able to deceive Andrews because of his troops’ dramatic increase in men from the last time that the two met. He added two whole brigades to his force, most of whom were unarmed volunteers. He was planning on meeting up with fellow Confederate, Major General Sterling Price, who was planning on raiding Missouri. Shelby's division was dressed in almost exclusively Union uniforms, which also threw Andrews off. The Confederates attacked swiftly and captured 3 forts while the Union was preoccupied. Meanwhile, Colonel Greenville M. Mitchell gathered his surviving companies and pushed forward to hold off Shelby's attacks. For extra help, Mitchell called Andrews who was able to send 890 men worth of reinforcements. These reinforcements were under command of Colonel Washington F. Geiger, who was sent from DeValls Bluff, Arkansas. He was able to do this because there had been multiple fortifications constructed along the White River. These stations prevented Confederates from destroying the railroad tracks by the White River and also helped Generals communicate with each other. They were called “Hay Stations” because they allowed soldiers to protect and harvest the hay fields that were close to the river. Geiger's troops engaged with Shelby's troops. They fought for two hours. Eventually, some of the Confederate forces were pushed back. However, the main rebel force was busy destroying the hay machines and parts of the railroad that were near the White River. The volunteers that Shelby had recruited to his army helped him destroy things immensely. Having so many more troops than the Union, the Confederacy was able to damage the things they needed most, the Hay Stations and the Union railroads. Shelby assembled the best of his forces to destroy the Hay Stations. The three brigades that he chose were led by Colonel David Shanks, Colonel Sidney. D. Jackman, and Colonel Thomas H. McCray. Geiger made his way back to the White River as the night approached but were held up by another short battle. They fought for about 30 minutes at Big Cypress Creek, Arkansas before returning to their base.

== Effects ==
Shelby's troops and cavalrymen destroyed over ten miles of railroad track, burned about 3,000 bales of hay, destroyed 20 hay-cutting machines, raided five Union stations, and killed many horses and livestock. These final battles at the White River were Brigadier General Joseph O. Shelby's and his troops’ final attacks on northeast Arkansas that summer.

== Casualties ==
Overall, Brigadier General Joseph O. Shelby's troops suffered about 173 casualties, mostly being wounds. He also reported in his log that his troops captured 577 Union soldiers and killed or wounded about 200 more. However, General Christopher Columbus Andrews only reported 400 to 500 casualties, including the ones from Geiger's troops.
