= Arkansas's congressional districts =

Electoral districts of the US state

Map of Arkansas's congressional districts since 2023 Interactive map version

The U.S. state of Arkansas currently has four United States congressional districts. The state has had as many as seven districts; the 5th district existed from 1883 through 1963, the 6th existed from 1893 to 1963, and the 7th existed from 1903 to 1953. No Democrat has won a House seat in the state since 2012.

== Current districts and representatives ==
This is a list of United States representatives from Arkansas, their terms, their district boundaries, and the district political ratings according to the CPVI. The delegation has a total of 4 members, all Republicans.

Current U.S. representatives from Arkansas
District	Member (Residence)	Party	Incumbent since	CPVI (2025)	District map
1st	Rick Crawford (Jonesboro)	Republican	January 3, 2011	R+23	Map of Arkansas' 1st congressional district
2nd	French Hill (Little Rock)	Republican	January 3, 2015	R+8	Map of Arkansas' 2nd congressional district
3rd	Steve Womack (Rogers)	Republican	January 3, 2011	R+13	Map of Arkansas' 3rd congressional district
4th	Bruce Westerman (Hot Springs)	Republican	January 3, 2015	R+20	Map of Arkansas' 4th congressional district

== Historical results ==
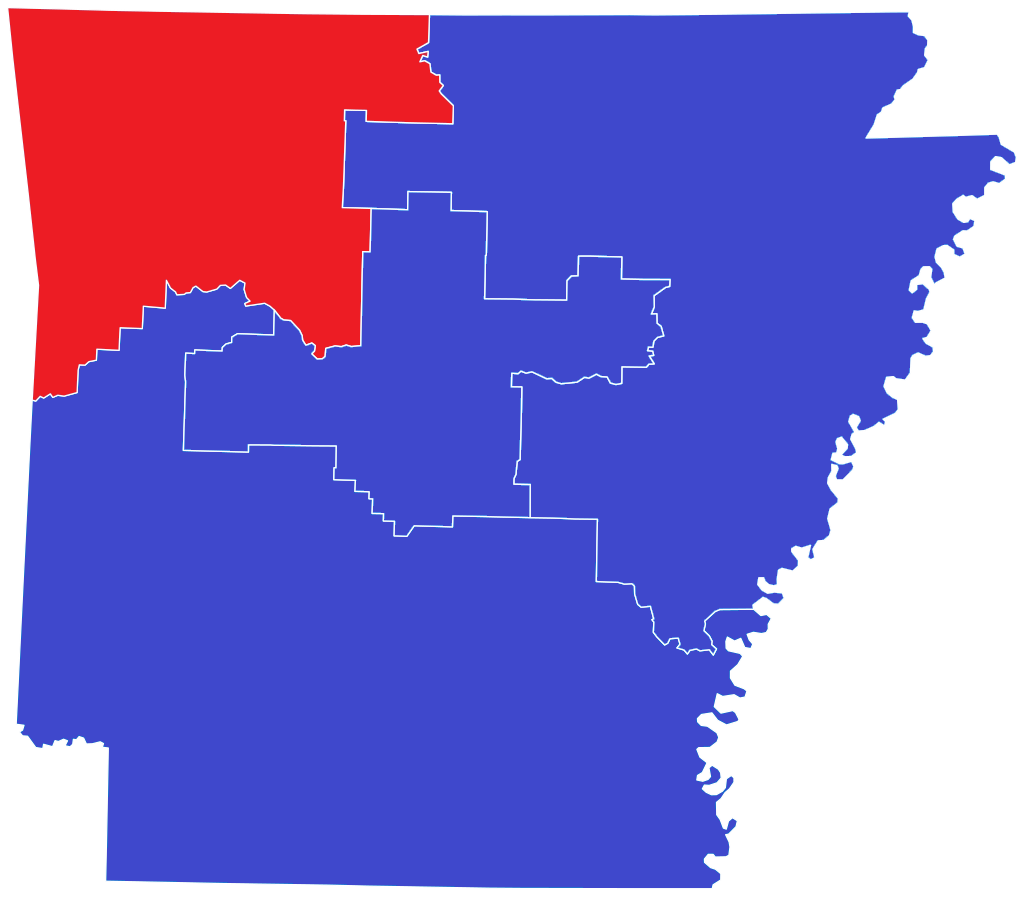
2002

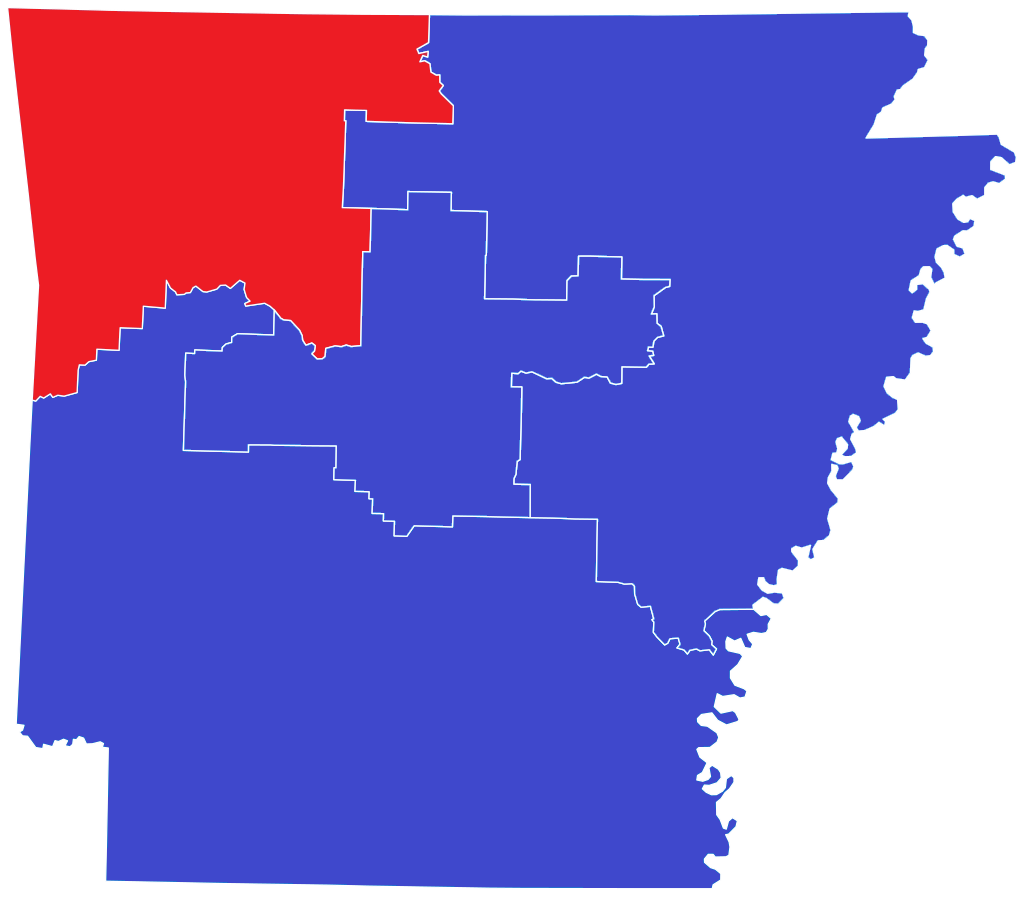
2004

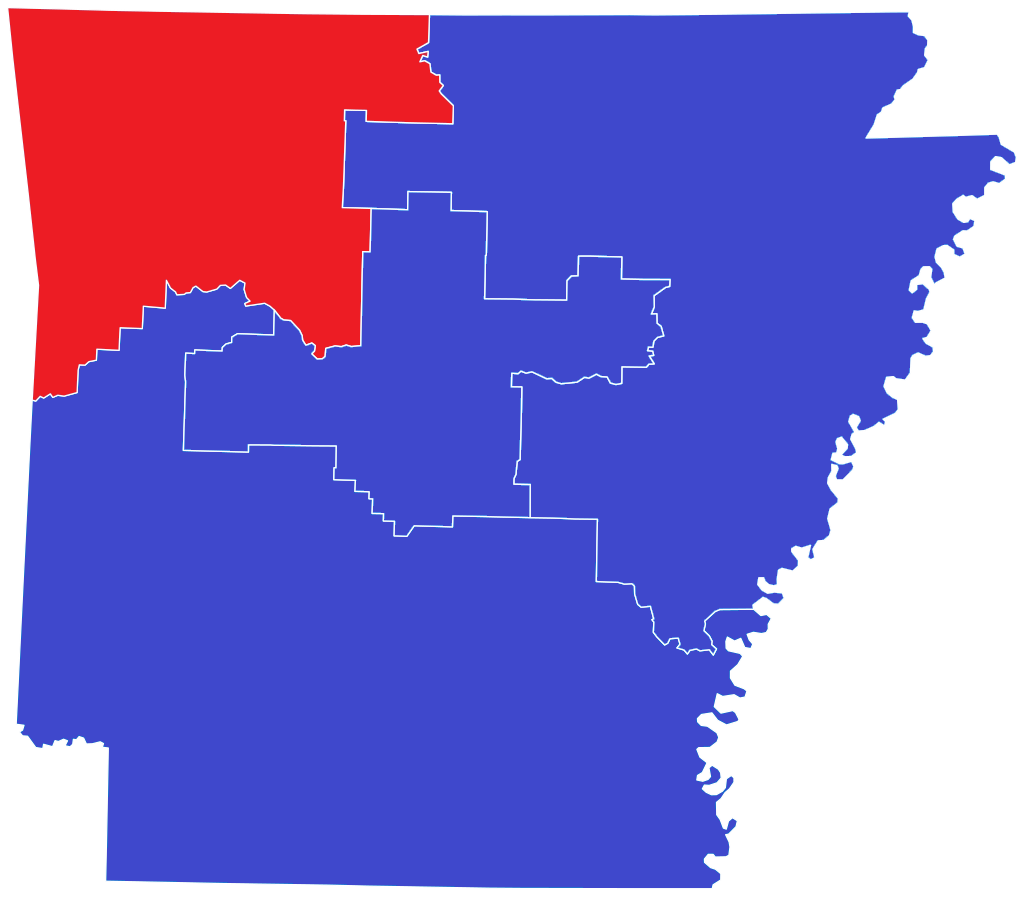
2006

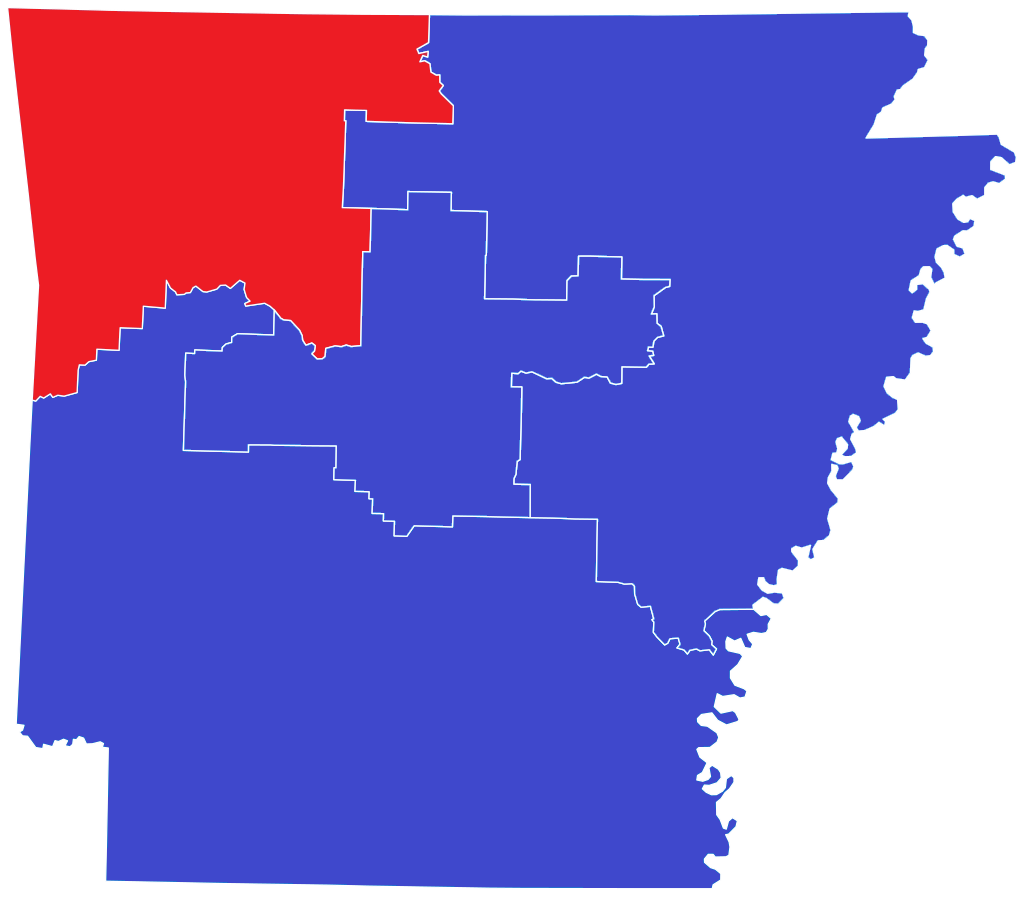
2008

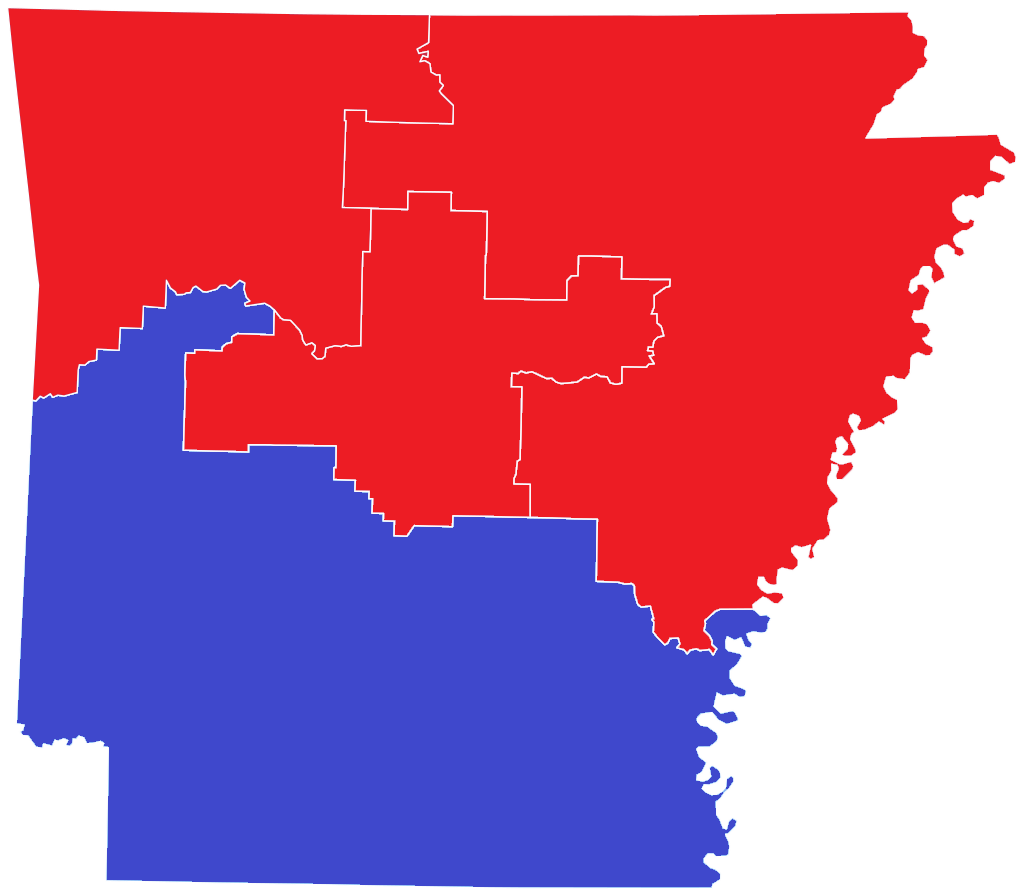
2010

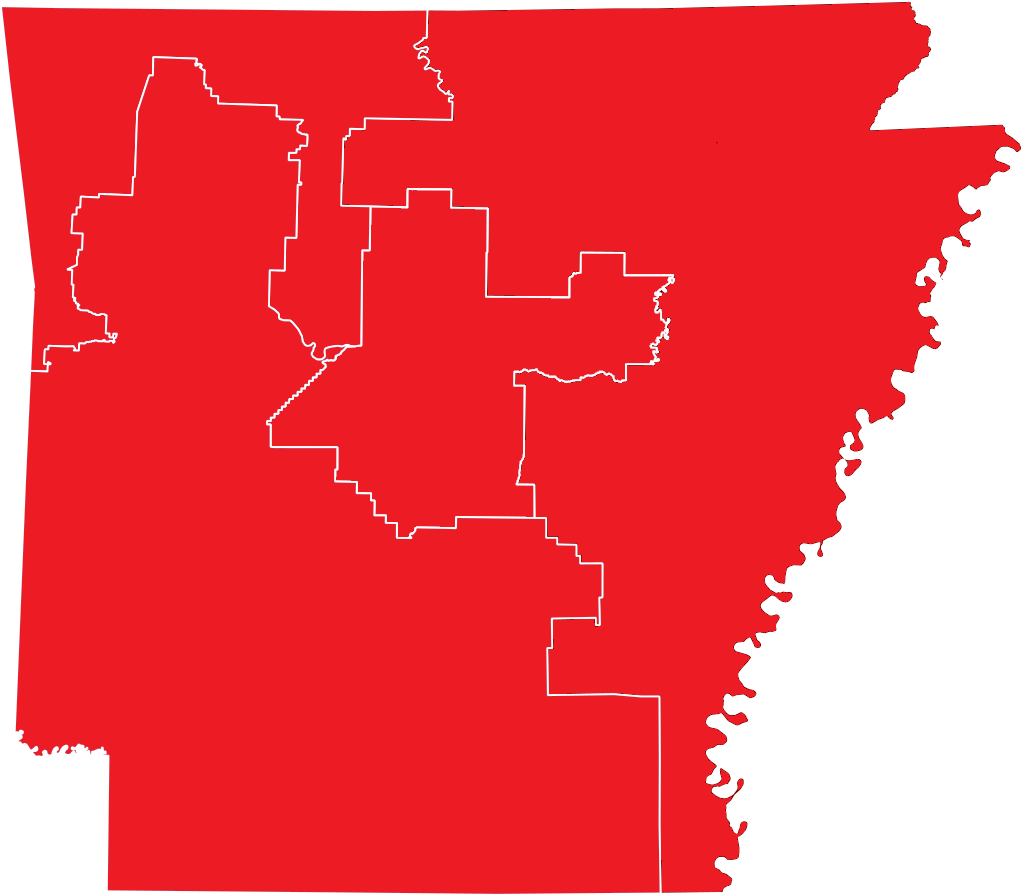
2012

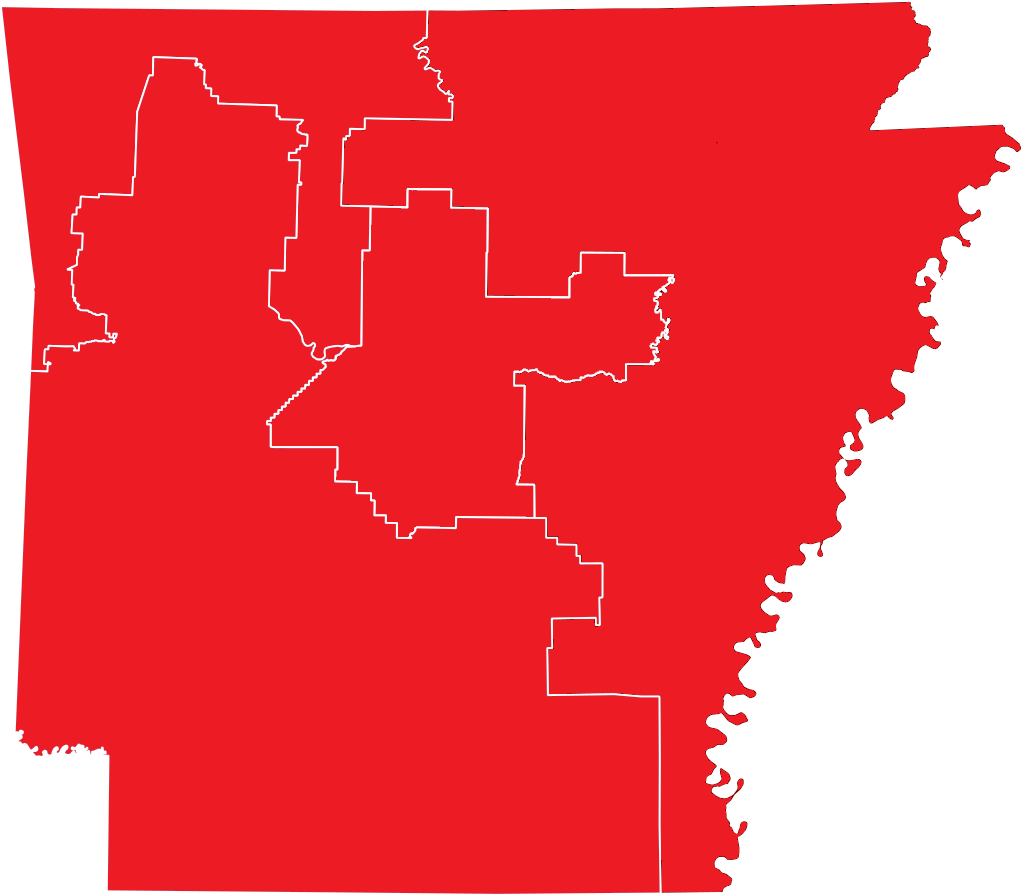
2014

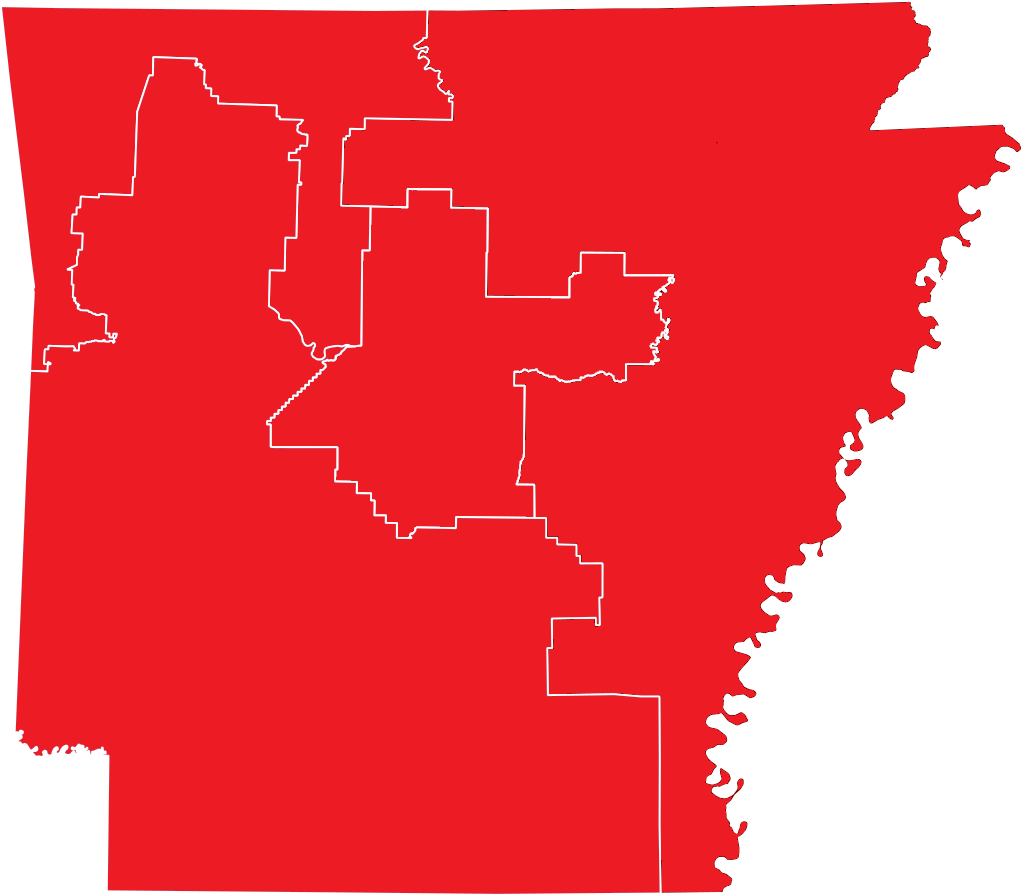
2016

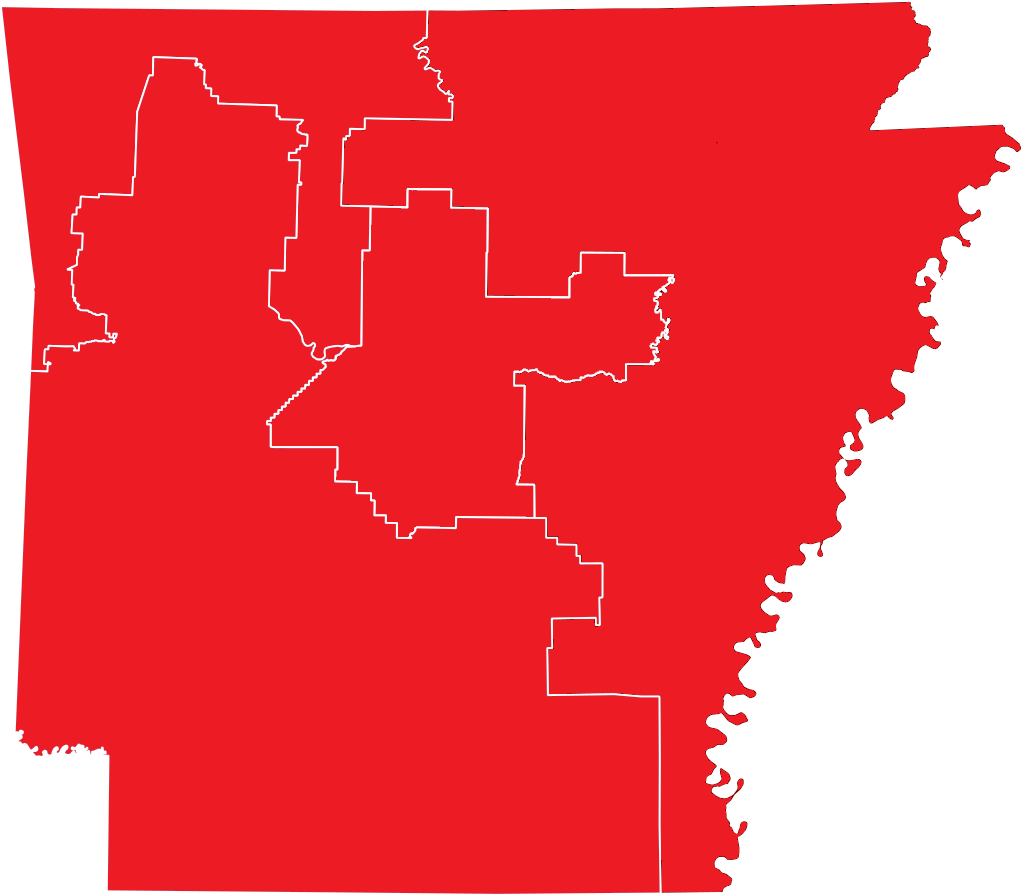
2018

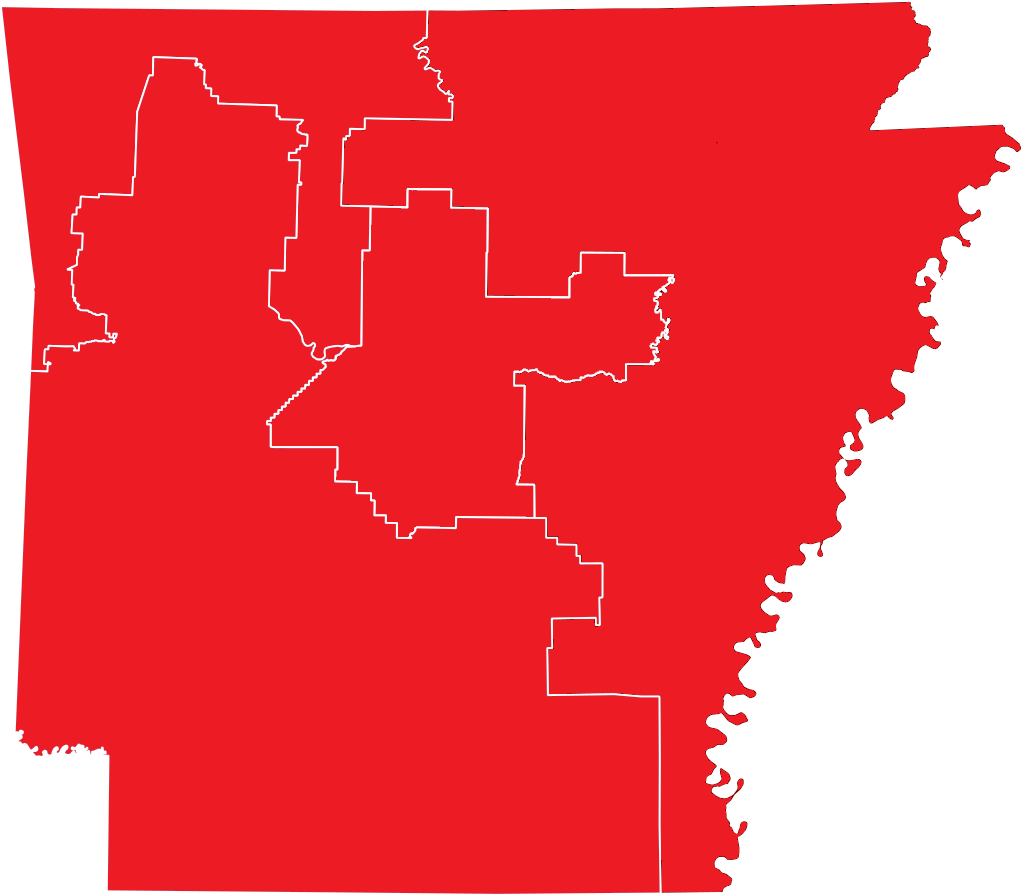
2020

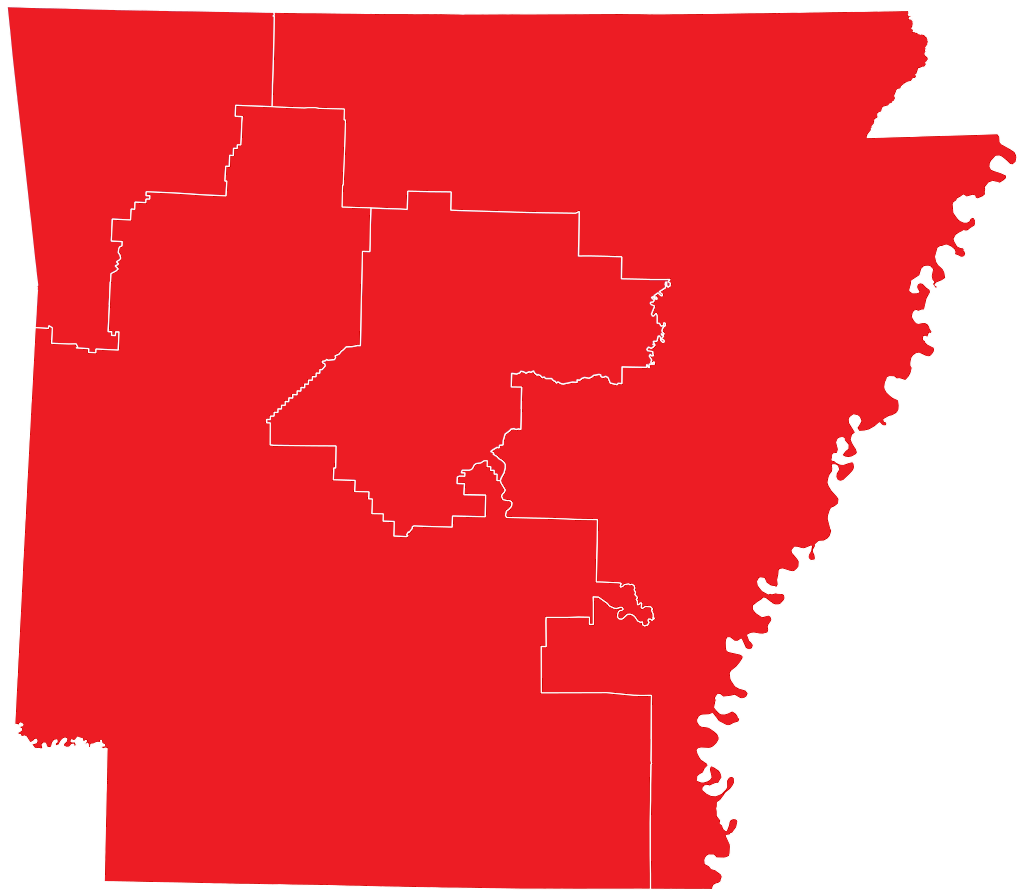
2022

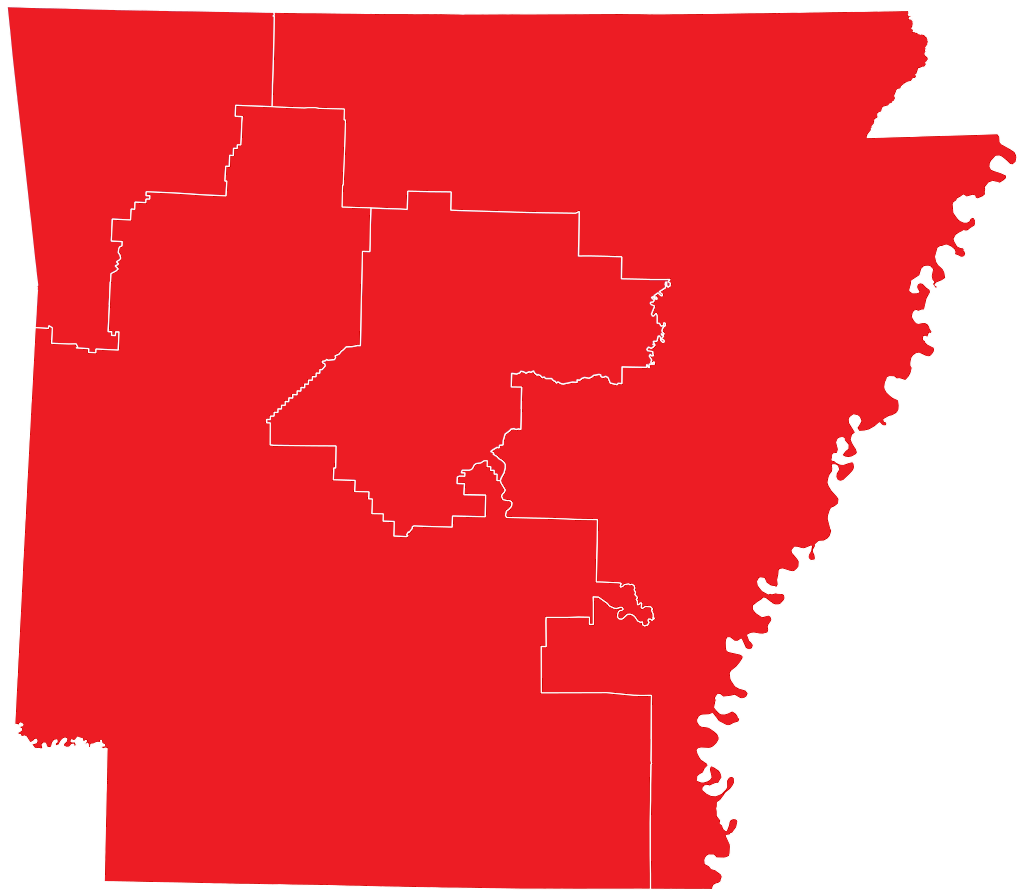
2024

== Historical and present district boundaries ==
Table of United States congressional district boundary maps in the State of Arkansas, presented chronologically. All redistricting events that took place in Arkansas between 1973 and 2013 are shown.

Year	Statewide map
1973–1983	
1983–1993	
1993–2003	
2003–2013	
2013–2023	
2023–present	

== Obsolete districts ==
- Arkansas Territory's at-large congressional district, obsolete since statehood
- Arkansas's at-large congressional district (1836–1885)
- Arkansas's 5th congressional district, obsolete since the 1960 census
- Arkansas's 6th congressional district, obsolete since the 1960 census
- Arkansas's 7th congressional district, obsolete since the 1950 census

== See also ==
- List of United States congressional districts
