= Seal of Arkansas =

Official government emblem of the U.S. state of Arkansas

The Great Seal of Arkansas

Versions
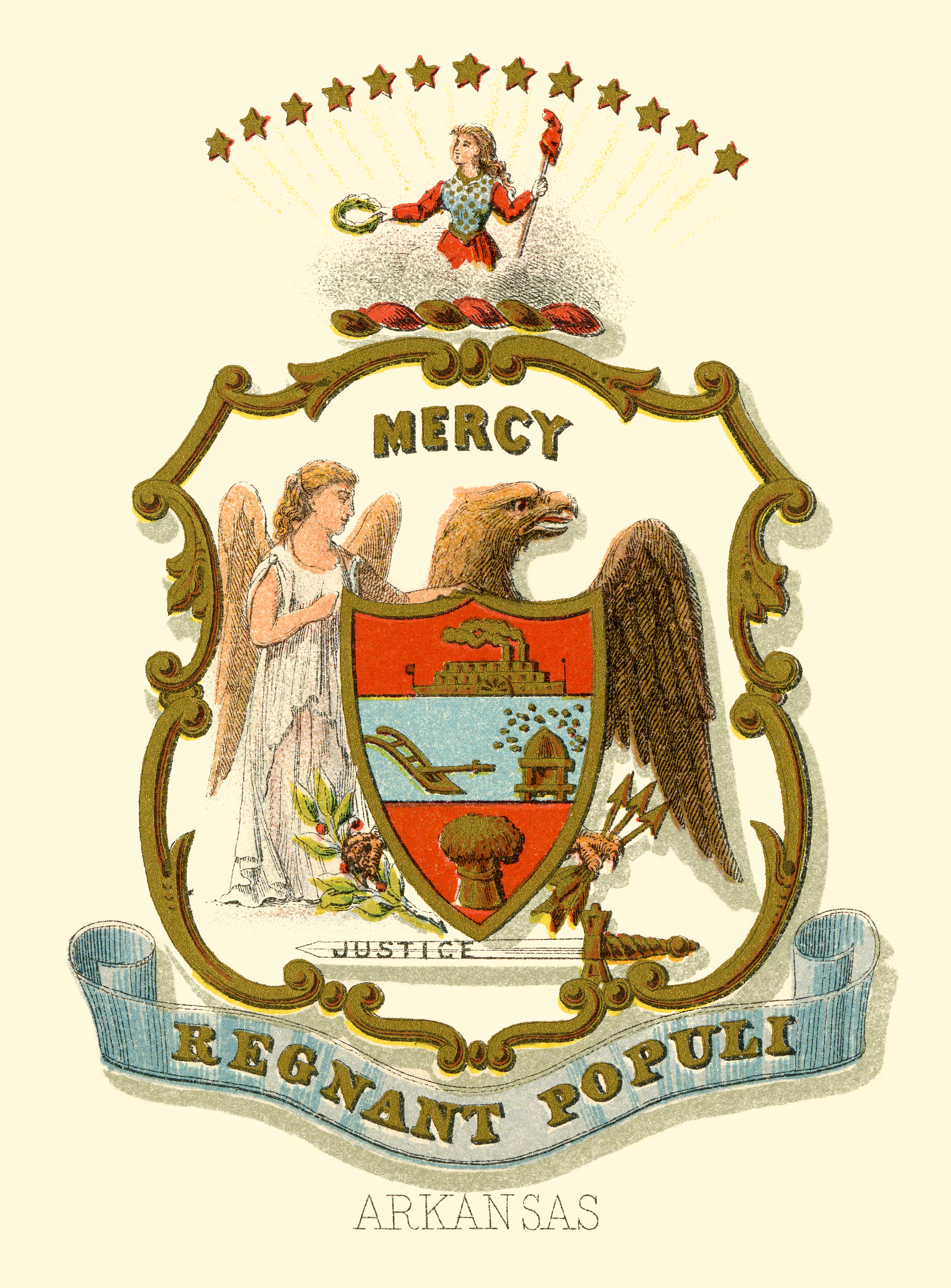
- Historical coat of arms
- Armiger: State of Arkansas
- Adopted: May 3, 1864; 162 years ago (modifications made in 1907)
- Motto: Latin: Regnat populus, lit. 'The people rule'
- Earlier version(s): 1836–1864, the State of Arkansas; 1820–1836, the Territory of Arkansas

The Great Seal of Arkansas is used to authenticate certain documents issued by the government of Arkansas. The phrase is used both for the physical seal itself, which is kept by the governor, and more generally for the design impressed upon it. The seal was modified to its present form in 1907.

== Design ==
Title 1 of the Arkansas Code specifies that the seal “shall present the following impressions, devices and emblems, to wit: An eagle at the bottom, holding a scroll in its beak, inscribed ‘Regnat populus,’ a bundle of arrows in one claw and an olive branch in the other; a shield covering the breast of the eagle, engraved with a steamboat at top, a beehive and plow in the middle, and sheaf of wheat at the bottom; the Goddess of Liberty at the top, holding a wreath in her right hand, a pole in the left hand, surmounted by a liberty cap, and surrounded by a circle of stars outside of which is a circle of rays; the figure of an angel on the left, inscribed ‘Mercy,’ and a sword on the right hand, inscribed ‘Justice,’ surrounded with the words ‘Seal of the State of Arkansas.’ ”

== History ==
The present seal was established pursuant to an Act of Assembly passed on May 23, 1907. It amended the act of May 3, 1864, by correcting the wording of the Latin motto from Regnant populi to Regnat populus.

== Great Seal of the State ==
The seal of the region changed over time.

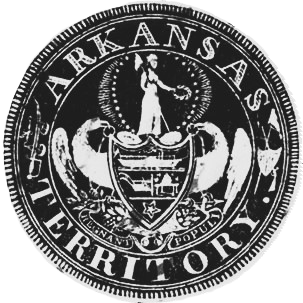
Territorial

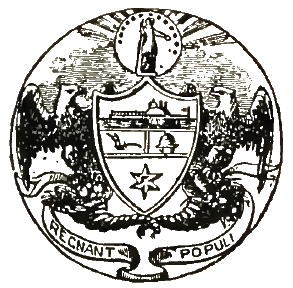
1836 design

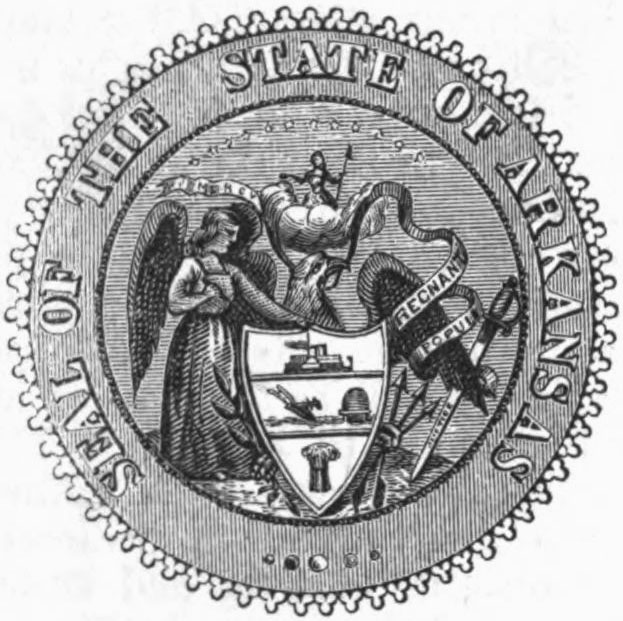
1864 design

1907 design

== See also ==
- Flag of Arkansas
- Symbols of the State of Arkansas
