= List of Arkansas area codes =

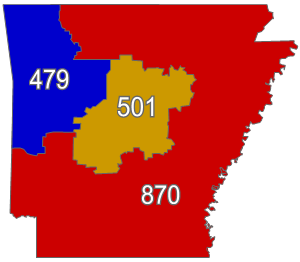

The state of Arkansas is divided into three numbering plan areas (NPAs) in the North American Numbering Plan (NANP), which are identified by four area codes, with one NPA being configured as an overlay complex of two area codes. In 1947, when the American Telephone and Telegraph Company (AT&T) published the first configuration of a nationwide telephone numbering plan, the entire state of Arkansas was assigned the area code 501. With Arkansas being relatively sparsely populated, this arrangement worked well until 1997, when the phone numbers in area code 501 were in danger of being used up. Area code 870 was created in April 1997 to serve the most rural parts of the state (originally specifically not Little Rock metro, Fort Smith or Northwest Arkansas). In January 2002, area code 479 broke from 501, giving Fort Smith and Northwest Arkansas their own area code.

Area code	Year	Parent NPA	Overlay	Numbering plan area
501	1947	–	–	Little Rock area and central Arkansas
870	1997	501	327/870	eastern and southern Arkansas, as well as most of northern Arkansas, with the exception of the north-western corner of the state; includes Pine Bluff, Jonesboro, Texarkana, and the Memphis suburbs
327	2024	870	327/870	eastern and southern Arkansas, as well as most of northern Arkansas, with the exception of the north-western corner of the state; includes Pine Bluff, Jonesboro, Texarkana, and the Memphis suburbs
479	2001	501	–	northwestern Arkansas, including Fort Smith and Fayetteville
