= List of Arkansas state forests =

== Arkansas state forests ==
- Poison Springs State Forest - Ouachita County
- Hot Springs State Forest
- Lucky Hollow State Forest

== See also ==
- List of national forests of the United States
