= List of places in Arkansas =

Arkansas State Seal

This is a list of places in Arkansas, including cities, towns, unincorporated communities, counties and other recognized places. It also includes information on the number and names of counties in which the place lies, and its lower and upper zip code bounds, if applicable. Click on the letter below which corresponds to the first letter in the name of the location you are looking for. A listing of all counties is listed under the section Counties. Clicking on "Top" will bring you back to this page.

Each page has two sections: the first being for cities and towns (incorporated land, also including any recognized locations), and townships (with the exception of the Counties page).

== See also ==
- List of counties in Arkansas
- List of cities and towns in Arkansas
- List of townships in Arkansas
