= List of Superfund sites in Arkansas =

This is a list of Superfund sites in Arkansas designated under the Comprehensive Environmental Response, Compensation, and Liability Act (CERCLA) environmental law. The CERCLA federal law of 1980 authorized the United States Environmental Protection Agency (EPA) to create a list of polluted locations requiring a long-term response to clean up hazardous material contaminations. These locations are known as Superfund sites, and are placed on the National Priorities List (NPL). The NPL guides the EPA in "determining which sites warrant further investigation" for environmental remediation. As of March 26, 2010, there were nine Superfund sites on the National Priorities List in Arkansas. No additional sites are currently proposed for entry on the list. Six sites have been cleaned up and removed from the list.

== Superfund sites ==
Deleted from National Priorities List

CERCLIS ID	Name	County	Reason	Proposed	Listed	Construction completed	Partially deleted	Deleted
ARD084930148	Arkwood, Inc.	Boone	Soil contaminated by PAHs, PCP and trace dioxins and a nearby spring contaminated by PCP, from former wood treatment activities.	09/18/1985	03/31/1989	06/28/1996	–	–
ARD980496186	Cecil Lindsey	Jackson	Solid waste containing metal industry waste and contaminated by pesticides, heavy metals; leachate contains heavy metals and organic compounds with potential to contaminate groundwater and surface water.	12/30/1982	09/08/1983	03/16/1989	–	09/22/1989
ARD059636456	Frit Industries	Lawrence	Soil and groundwater contamination by zinc sulfate, cadmium, chromium and lead after a 1979 fire in a storage facility.	12/30/1982	09/08/1983	–	–	10/14/1997
ARD035662469	Gurley Pit	Crittenden	Oil refinery waste was dumped in a pit on site. The waste sludge contains PCBs and soil and groundwater are contaminated by barium, lead and zinc.	12/30/1982	09/08/1983	09/13/1994	–	11/06/2003
ARD980496368	Industrial Waste Control	Sebastian	Several hundred buried drums contained methylene dichloride, toluene, PAHs and heavy metals, including nickel, chromium and lead. Drums and contents have been removed and incinerated; highly contaminated soil has been stabilized on site.	12/30/1982	09/08/1983	06/10/1992	–	04/07/2008
ARD980809941	Jacksonville Municipal Landfill	Lonoke	Soil contamination from illegal dumping of industrial waste including dioxins and herbicides.	01/22/1987	07/22/1987	09/25/1995	–	03/14/2000
ARD980745665	Midland Products	Yell	Soil, sediment, surface water and groundwater contamination by PCP and PAHs from former wood treatment activities.	10/15/1984	06/10/1986	12/21/1993	–	–
ARD092916188	Mid-South Wood Products	Polk	Soil and groundwater contamination by arsenic, cadmium, chromium, PCP and creosote from wood treatment activities, threatening local fisheries and drinking wells for around 5,700 people.	12/30/1982	09/08/1983	09/28/1989	–	–
ARD980864110	Monroe Auto Equipment (Paragould Pit)	Greene	Soil and groundwater contamination by VOCs and heavy metals including chromium and lead. The site contains an estimated 3,000 cubic yards of electroplating waste sludge.	10/26/1989	08/30/1990	09/19/2001	–	–
ARD049658628	Mountain Pine Pressure Treating	Yell	Liquid waste and sludge containing PCP and arsenic, and contaminated soil from former wood treatment operations have been stabilized and safely buried on site.	04/23/1999	07/22/1999	09/28/2005	–	–
ARD042755231	Ouachita-Nevada Wood Treaters	Ouachita	Soil, surface water and liquid waste contaminated by PCP and arsenic from former wood treatment operations. Waste and contaminated soil have been removed from the site and incinerated.	02/04/2000	05/11/2000	09/21/2006	–	–
ARD008052508	Popile, Inc.	Union	Groundwater, surface water and soil contamination by creosote and pentachlorophenol from former wood treatment operations.	02/07/1992	10/14/1992	09/28/2001	–	–
ARD981055809	Rogers Road Municipal Landfill	Pulaski	Deteriorating drums containing dioxin-contaminated herbicides and pesticides, and contaminated soil have been removed from the site and safely destroyed.	01/22/1987	07/22/1987	09/25/1995	–	Pending
ARD980496723	South 8th Street Landfill	Crittenden	Approximately 20,000 cubic yards of highly acidic oily sludge containing lead, PCBs and PAHs and 22,000 cubic yards of contaminated soil have been neutralized. Other soil in the landfill is contaminated by PCBs and pesticides. Groundwater contamination by lead, arsenic and manganese has been cleaned up.	02/07/1992	10/14/1992	09/19/2000	–	09/28/2004
ARD000023440	Vertac, Inc.	Pulaski	Liquid and solid wastes, soil, sediments, buildings, equipment contaminated by herbicides, dioxins, VOCs and herbicide production waste. Contaminated materials have been safely disposed of off-site or placed in an on-site hazardous waste landfill.	12/30/1982	09/08/1983	08/31/1998	–	–

== See also ==
- List of Superfund sites in the United States
- List of environmental issues
- List of waste types
- TOXMAP
