= List of snakes of Arkansas =

This is a list of the known varieties of snakes in Arkansas

== Non-venomous ==
Image	Binomial Name	Name
	Carphophis amoenus helenae	Midwestern worm snake
	Carphophis vermis	Western worm snake
	Cemophora coccinea copei	Northern scarlet snake
	Clonophis kirtlandii	Kirtland's snake
	Coluber constrictor	Eastern racer
	Diadophis punctatus	Ring-necked snake
	Farancia abacura reinwardtii	Western mud snake
	Heterodon platirhinos	Eastern hognose snake
	Lampropeltis calligaster calligaster	Prairie kingsnake
	Lampropeltis getula holbrooki	Speckled kingsnake
	Lampropeltis triangulum	Milk snake
	Liodytes rigida	Glossy swamp snake
	Masticophis flagellum flagellum	Eastern coachwhip
	Nerodia cyclopion	Mississippi green watersnake
	Nerodia erythrogaster	Plainbelly water snake
	Nerodia fasciata confluens	Broad-banded water snake
	Nerodia rhombifer	Diamondback water snake
	Nerodia sipedon	Northern water snake
	Nerodia sipedon pleuralis	Midland water snake
	Pantherophis slowinskii	Slowinski's corn snake
	Regina grahamii	Graham's crayfish snake
	Regina septemvittata	Queen snake
	Storeria dekayi wrightorum	Midland brown snake
	Storeria occipitomaculata	Redbelly snake
	Tantilla gracilis	Flathead snake
	Thamnophis proximus	Western ribbon snake
	Thamnophis sirtalis	Common garter snake
	Tropidoclonion lineatum	Lined snake
	Virginia striatula	Rough earth snake
	Virginia valeriae	Smooth earth snake

== Venomous ==
Image	Binomial Name	Name
	Agkistrodon contortrix contortrix	Southern copperhead
	Agkistrodon piscivorus	Northern Cottonmouth
	Crotalus atrox	Western diamondback rattlesnake
	Crotalus horridus	Timber rattlesnake
	Sistrurus miliarius streckeri	Western pigmy rattlesnake
	Micrurus tener tener	Texas coral snake

== See also ==
- List of snakes by state (U.S.)
