= Outline of Arkansas =

U.S. state

Flag of Arkansas

Great Seal of Arkansas

The location of the state of Arkansas in the United States of America

The following outline is provided as an overview of and topical guide to the U.S. state of Arkansas:

Arkansas (/ˈɑːrkənsɔː/ , AR-kən-saw) is a landlocked state in the West South Central region of the Southern United States. It borders Missouri to the north, Tennessee and Mississippi to the east, Louisiana to the south, Texas to the southwest, and Oklahoma to the west. Its name derives from the Osage language, and refers to their relatives, the Quapaw people. The state's diverse geography ranges from the mountainous regions of the Ozark and Ouachita Mountains, which make up the U.S. Interior Highlands, to the densely forested land in the south known as the Arkansas Timberlands, to the eastern lowlands along the Mississippi River and the Arkansas Delta.

== General reference ==
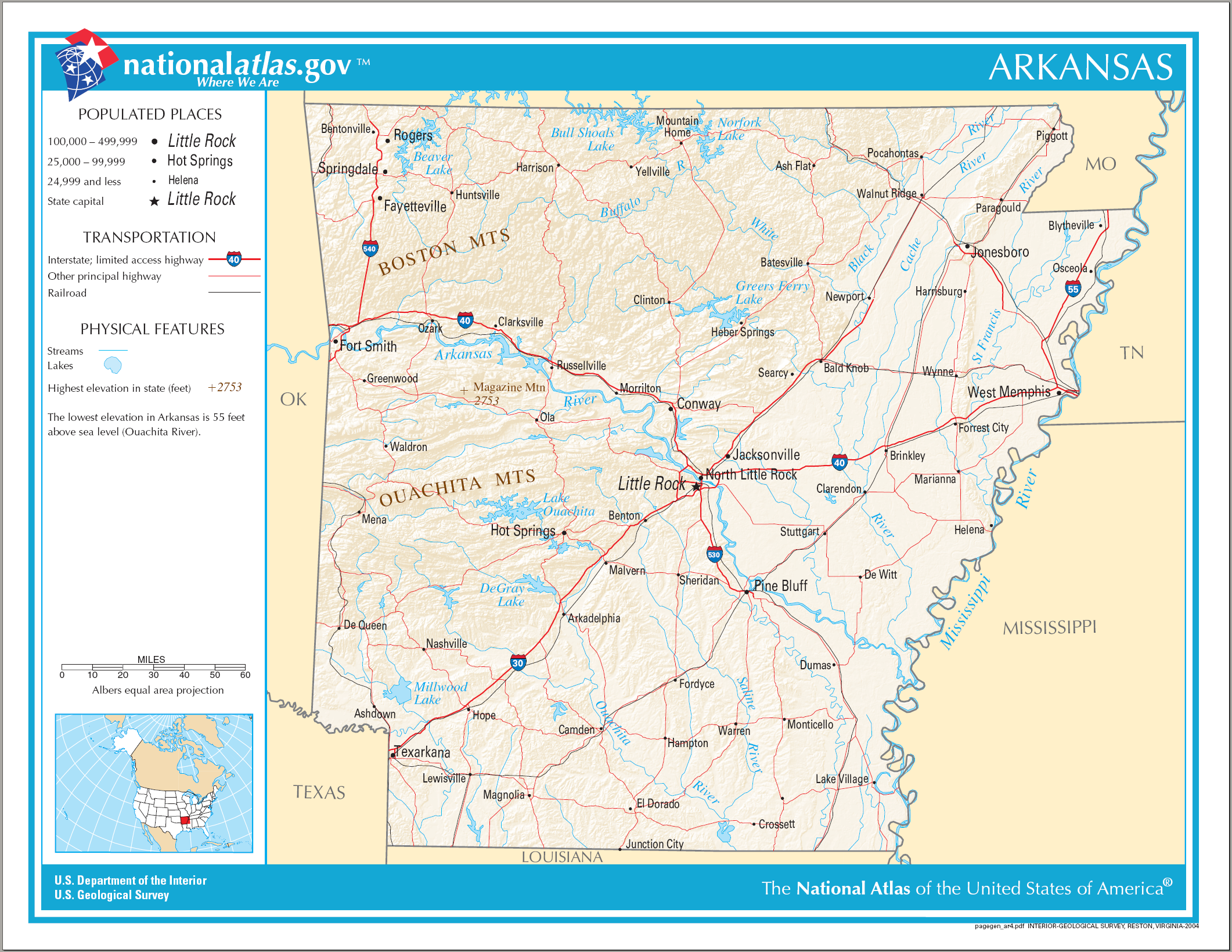
An enlargeable map of the state of Arkansas

- Names
  - Common name: Arkansas
    - Pronunciation: /ˈɑːrkənsɔː/ AR-kən-saw
  - Official name: State of Arkansas
  - Abbreviations and name codes
    - Postal symbol: AR
    - ISO 3166-2 code: US-AR
    - Internet second-level domain: .ar.us
  - Nicknames
    - Bear State (pronounced "Bar State")
    - Bowie State
    - Hot Springs State
    - Land of Opportunity (former official nickname; previously used on license plates)
    - The Natural State (currently used on license plates)
    - Razorback State
    - Toothpick State
    - Wonder State
    - Diamond State
- Adjectival: Arkansas
- Demonyms
  - Arkansan
  - Arkansawyer

== Geography of Arkansas ==
Geography of Arkansas

- Arkansas is: a U.S. state, a federal state of the United States of America
- Location
  - Northern Hemisphere
  - Western Hemisphere
  - Americas
    - North America
      - Anglo America
      - Northern America
        - United States of America
          - Contiguous United States
            - Southern United States
              - South Central United States
- Population of Arkansas: 2,915,918 (2010 U.S. Census)
- Area of Arkansas: 53,179 sq mi (137,732 km^{2})
- Atlas of Arkansas

=== Places in Arkansas ===
Places in Arkansas

- Historic places in Arkansas
  - Ghost towns in Arkansas
  - National Historic Landmarks in Arkansas
  - National Register of Historic Places listings in Arkansas
    - Bridges on the National Register of Historic Places in Arkansas
- National Natural Landmarks in Arkansas
- State parks in Arkansas

=== Environment of Arkansas ===
- Climate of Arkansas
- Protected areas in Arkansas
  - State forests of Arkansas
- Superfund sites in Arkansas
- Wildlife of Arkansas
  - Flora of Arkansas
  - Fauna of Arkansas
    - Reptiles
      - Snakes of Arkansas

==== Natural geographic features of Arkansas ====
- Lakes of Arkansas
- Rivers of Arkansas

=== Regions of Arkansas ===
- Arkansas Delta
- Arkansas River Valley
- Arkansas Timberlands
- Ark-La-Tex
- Central Arkansas
- Crowley's Ridge
- Four State Area
- Osage Plains
- Ouachita Mountains
- The Ozarks
- Piney Woods
- South Arkansas
- U.S. Interior Highlands
- Western Arkansas

==== Metropolitan areas of Arkansas ====
Arkansas statistical areas

- Central Arkansas
- Northwest Arkansas
- Fort Smith
- Texarkana
- Jonesboro
- Hot Springs
- Memphis (TN)

==== Administrative divisions of Arkansas ====
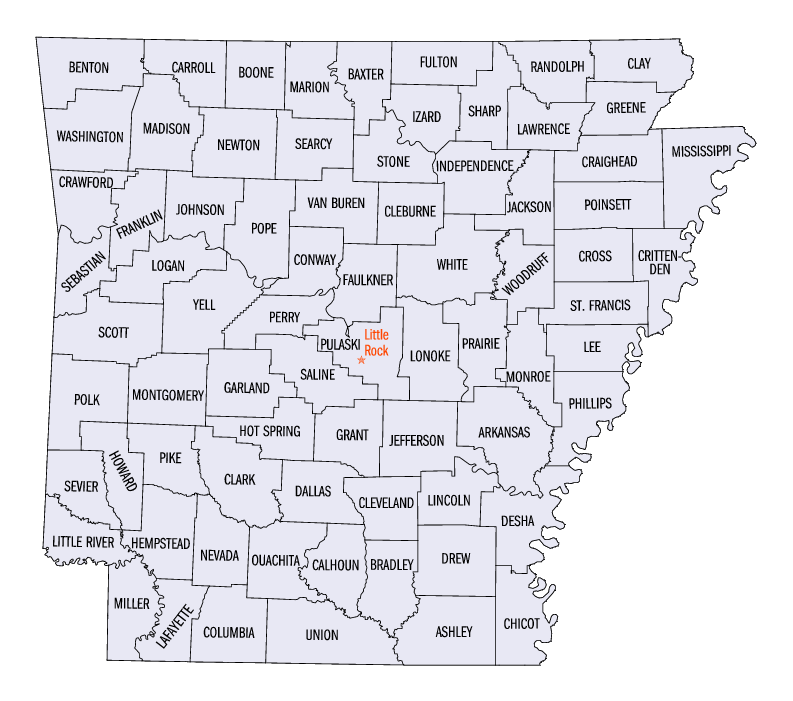
An enlargeable map of the 75 counties of the state of Arkansas

- The 75 counties of the state of Arkansas
  - Municipalities in Arkansas
    - Cities in Arkansas
      - State capital of Arkansas: Little Rock
      - City nicknames in Arkansas

=== Demography of Arkansas ===
Demographics of Arkansas

== Government and politics of Arkansas ==
Politics of Arkansas

- Form of government: U.S. state government
- Arkansas's congressional delegations
- Arkansas State Capitol
- Political party strength in Arkansas

=== Branches of the government of Arkansas ===
Government of Arkansas

==== Executive branch of the government of Arkansas ====
- Governor of Arkansas
  - Lieutenant Governor of Arkansas
  - Secretary of State of Arkansas
- State departments
  - Arkansas Department of Transportation

==== Legislative branch of the government of Arkansas ====
- Arkansas General Assembly (bicameral)
  - Upper house: Arkansas State Senate
  - Lower house: Arkansas House of Representatives

==== Judicial branch of the government of Arkansas ====
Courts of Arkansas

- Supreme Court of Arkansas

=== Law and order in Arkansas ===
Law of Arkansas

- Cannabis in Arkansas
- Capital punishment in Arkansas
  - Individuals executed in Arkansas
- Constitution of Arkansas
- Crime in Arkansas
- Gun laws in Arkansas
- Law enforcement in Arkansas
  - Law enforcement agencies in Arkansas
    - Arkansas State Police

=== Military in Arkansas ===
- Arkansas Air National Guard
- Arkansas Army National Guard

== History of Arkansas ==
=== History of Arkansas, by period ===
- Indigenous peoples
- French colony of Louisiane, 1699–1764
  - Treaty of Fontainebleau of 1762
- Spanish (though predominantly Francophone) district of Alta Luisiana, 1764–1803
  - Third Treaty of San Ildefonso of 1800
- French district of Haute-Louisiane, 1803
  - Louisiana Purchase of 1803
- Unorganized U.S. territory created by the Louisiana Purchase, 1803–1804
- District of Louisiana, 1804–1805
- Territory of Louisiana, 1805–1812
- Territory of Missouri, (1812–1819)–1821
  - Adams-Onis Treaty of 1819
- Territory of Arkansaw, 1819–1836
- State of Arkansas becomes the 25th state admitted to the United States of America on June 15, 1836
  - Mexican–American War, April 25, 1846 – February 2, 1848
  - American Civil War, April 12, 1861 – May 13, 1865
    - Arkansas in the American Civil War
        - Ninth state to declare secession from the United States of America on May 6, 1861
        - Ninth state admitted to the Confederate States of America on May 18, 1861
      - Battle of Pea Ridge, March 7–8, 1862
      - Battle of Whitney's Lane, May 19, 1862
      - Battle of Saint Charles, June 17, 1862
      - Battle of Hill's Plantation, July 7, 1862
      - Battle of Cane Hill, November 28, 1862
      - Battle of Prairie Grove, December 7, 1862
      - Battle of Arkansas Post, January 9–11, 1863
      - Battle of Chalk Bluff, May 1–2, 1863
      - Battle of Helena, July 4, 1863
      - Battle of Devil's Backbone, September 1, 1863
      - Battle of Bayou Fourche, September 10, 1863
      - Battle of Pine Bluff, October 25, 1863
      - Battle of Elkin's Ferry, April 3–4, 1864
      - Battle of Prairie D'Ane, April 9–13, 1864
      - Battle of Poison Spring, April 18, 1864
      - Battle of Marks' Mills, April 25, 1864
      - Battle of Jenkins' Ferry, April 30, 1864
      - Battle of Old River Lake, June 5–6, 1864
  - Arkansas in Reconstruction, 1865–1868
      - Second former Confederate state readmitted to the United States of America on June 22, 1868
  - Hot Springs National Park established on March 4, 1921
  - Civil Rights Movement from December 1, 1955, to January 20, 1969
    - Little Rock Crisis, September 4, 1957 – May 27, 1958
  - Bill Clinton becomes 42nd President of the United States on January 20, 1993

=== History of Arkansas, by region ===
- History of Little Rock, Arkansas

=== History of Arkansas, by subject ===
- List of Arkansas state legislatures
- History of universities in Arkansas
  - History of the University of Arkansas

=== Publications about Arkansas history ===
- Encyclopedia of Arkansas History & Culture

== Culture of Arkansas ==
Culture of Arkansas

- Museums in Arkansas
- Religion in Arkansas
  - The Church of Jesus Christ of Latter-day Saints in Arkansas
  - Episcopal Diocese of Arkansas
- Scouting in Arkansas
- State symbols of Arkansas
  - Flag of Arkansas
  - Great Seal of Arkansas

=== The arts in Arkansas ===
- Music of Arkansas

== Economy and infrastructure of Arkansas ==
Economy of Arkansas

- Communications in Arkansas
  - Newspapers in Arkansas
  - Radio stations in Arkansas
  - Television stations in Arkansas
  - Media in Little Rock, Arkansas
- Health care in Arkansas
  - Hospitals in Arkansas
- Transportation in Arkansas
  - Airports in Arkansas
  - Roads in Arkansas
    - U.S. Highways in Arkansas
    - Interstate Highways in Arkansas
    - State highways in Arkansas
    - State highway spurs in Arkansas

== Education in Arkansas ==
Education in Arkansas

- Schools in Arkansas
  - School districts in Arkansas
    - High schools in Arkansas
  - Colleges and universities in Arkansas
    - University of Arkansas
    - Arkansas State University

== See also ==
- Topic overview:
  - Arkansas
  - Index of Arkansas-related articles
