= Flag of Arkansas =

U.S. state flag

Arkansas
- Other names: Arkansas flag, Diamond flag
- Use: Civil and state flag
- Proportion: 2∶3
- Adopted: February 26, 1913; 113 years ago (modifications in 1923, 1924, and 2011)
- Design: A rectangular field of red, on which is placed a large white diamond, bordered by a wide band of blue. Across the diamond is the word 'Arkansas' in blue and four blue stars, one above, three below the word. On the blue band are placed 25 stars.
- Designed by: Willie K. Hocker

The state flag of the U.S. state of Arkansas, also known as the Arkansas flag, is a red banner charged with a large blue-bordered white lozenge (diamond). Twenty-nine five-pointed stars appear on the flag: twenty-five small white stars within the blue border, and four larger blue stars in the white diamond. The state's name appears in blue within the white lozenge, with one star above and three stars below. The star above and the two outer stars below point upwards; the inner star below points downwards. The flag was designed by Willie K. Hocker of Wabbaseka, a member of the United Daughters of the Confederacy and the Pine Bluff Chapter of the Arkansas Society of the Daughters of the American Revolution.

== Statute ==
=== Design ===
In the 2024 Arkansas Code (Title 1, Chapter 4, § 1-4-101), the state flag is defined as follows:

"a rectangle of red on which is placed a large white diamond, bordered by a wide band of blue on which are twenty-five (25) white stars. Across the diamond shall be the word 'ARKANSAS' and four (4) blue stars, with one (1) star above and three (3) stars below the word 'ARKANSAS.' The star above the word 'ARKANSAS' shall be below the upper corner of the diamond. The three (3) stars below the word 'ARKANSAS' shall be placed so that one (1) star shall be above the lower corner of the diamond and two (2) stars shall be placed symmetrically, parallel above and to the right and left of the star in the lower corner of the diamond."

=== Colors ===
The 2024 Arkansas Code (Title 1, Chapter 4, § 1-4-101), says that the colors used for the flag shall be:

"the same as those used on the United States flag, specifically to include Old Glory Red or its equivalent, and Old Glory Blue or its equivalent."

=== Symbolism ===
The flag's elements have a complex symbolism. According to the 1987 state law defining the flag, the diamond represents Arkansas' status as "the only diamond-bearing state in the Union". (Crater of Diamonds State Park was the only diamond mine in North America at the time, before more recent discoveries in Colorado and Montana. However, the state park is still the only place where the public can search for, and keep, diamonds.)

The 25 white stars around the border of the diamond represents Arkansas' position as the 25th state admitted to the Union.

The star above "ARKANSAS" represents the Confederacy, to which Arkansas was admitted on May 18, 1861.

The three stars below "ARKANSAS" have three separate meanings:

- The three other nations to which Arkansas has belonged (France, Spain, and the U.S.)
- The Louisiana Purchase, which brought Arkansas into the U.S., was signed in 1803.
- Arkansas was the third state (after Louisiana and Missouri) formed from the Louisiana Purchase.

The statute states that the two outer, upward-pointing stars of the three are considered "twin stars" representing the "twin states" of Arkansas and Michigan, which it claims were admitted together on June 15, 1836. However, that part of the statute contains two inaccuracies:

- The three stars were in a single row in Hocker's original design; they were not arranged in a triangle until later. Though one source indicates that the "twin states" symbolism was added by the 44th Arkansas General Assembly, another states Hocker's "twin stars" are actually two of the 25 stars in the diamond, in the far left and right points; the latter is more consistent with the original design, even though Michigan is actually the 26th state.
- While both states' acts of admission were signed by President Andrew Jackson on that day and Arkansas became a state immediately, Michigan was offered admission only on condition of ceding the Toledo Strip to Ohio in exchange for the Upper Peninsula. Once that happened, it was finally admitted on January 26, 1837.

In 2001, a survey conducted by the North American Vexillological Association (NAVA) placed the Arkansas state flag 45th in design quality out of the 72 Canadian provincial, U.S. state, and U.S. territory flags ranked.

== History ==
=== Pre-official flags ===
4 day before the Bombardment of Fort Sumter and the start of the American Civil War, a group of sessionists from Fayetteville flew a flag containing 15 stars with state coat of arms and some red and white stripes. This caused some Unionist to fly a National flag from the city court house as a sign of protest. During the war many of the state troops carried with them flags bearing the state coat of arms.

In 1871, a group of women from Little Rock organized a local fair. During the event they displayed their state flag. It was a pennant with the state coat of arms in the middle done up in oil paint.

A state flag was flown over the Arkansas state building during 1876 Centennial Exposition. Its design is unknown.

Another mention of a state flag was in 1890. In Little Rock, a local Temperance chapter was planning a large children's parade in the city. They ordered that the kids carry 2 flags, the American flag and a "State Banner". The banner's design was not described and it is unknown when it was made.

The first request for a state flag was 1908, when the American Consul-General in Shanghai, China asked the Governor for a state flag to be displayed in the Shanghai Volunteer Corps headquarters.

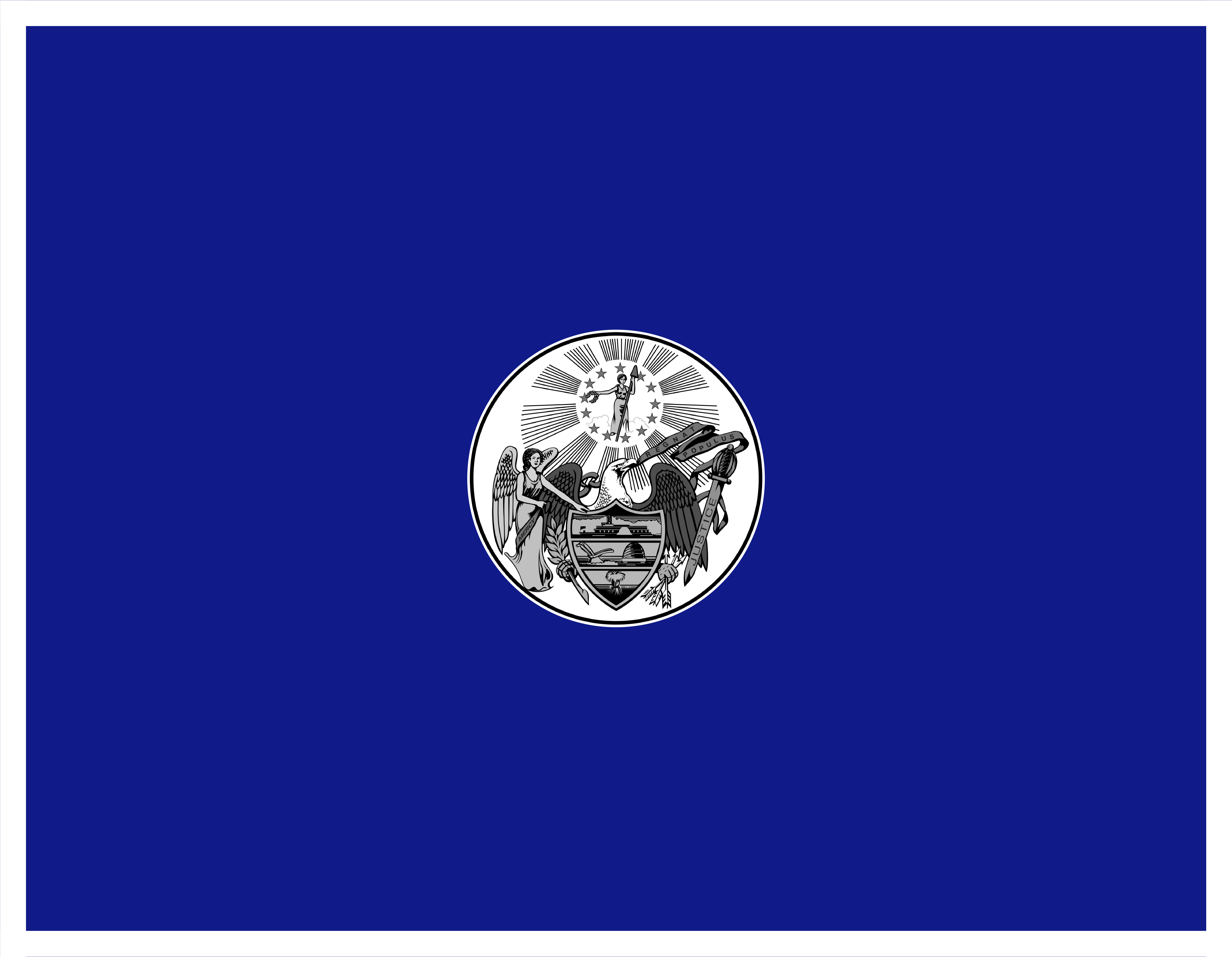
State flag proposed by The Arkansas Federation of Women's Club, 1910

In 1910, members of The Arkansas Federation of Women's Club came together to make a state flag for the National Convention of the American Federation of Women's Clubs in Cincinnati. According to Stan Harley, the flag was inspired by the regimental flags used during the Civil War, especially the 6th Arkansas Infantry Regiment. The flag contained a thin white border that surrounded a blue field with the state seal in the center. It was made by Mrs. John Ike Moore. After the Convention was over, they went to the Old State House and tried to present it but were unsuccessful.

=== Current flag ===
In 1912, the Pine Bluff Chapter of the Daughters of the American Revolution decided to present the newly commissioned battleship USS Arkansas with an official state flag. The chapter contacted Arkansas secretary of state Earle E. Hodges requesting information on how to obtain the state's flag. Hodges then informed the chapter that no such state flag existed. With Hodge's support, the Pine Bluff Chapter began a statewide contest to design a new state flag. A committee was appointed, and it asked for designs to be submitted for consideration, with 65 entries being submitted in total. Hocker's design was "a rectangular field of red, on which is placed a large white diamond, bordered by a wide band of blue. Across the diamond is the word 'ARKANSAS'," (placed there by request of the committee) "and the blue stars, one above, two below the word. On the blue band are placed 25 white stars."

In 1923, the legislature added a fourth star, representing the Confederate States. This fourth star was originally placed so that there were two stars above the state name and two below; this was to include the Confederate States alongside France, Spain, and the United States. Since this disturbed the other two meanings of the original three stars, the legislature corrected this in 1924 by placing the fourth star above "ARKANSAS" and the original three stars below it, as it is today. The 1924 design was confirmed as law in 1987 by Act 116, signed by Governor Bill Clinton.

In 2011, Act 1205 (formerly House Bill 1546) was signed by Governor Mike Beebe, adding some more details to the flag. In the terms of colors, the red and blue used on the flag of Arkansas are Old Glory Red and Old Glory Blue. The Act also stated that flags purchased by the secretary of state must be manufactured in the United States.

In 2018, the original 1913 Arkansas state flag and a 1923 version both underwent an estimated $20,000 in restoration cost.

Hocker flag proposal	State flag (1913–1923)	State flag (1913–1923) variant	State flag (1923–1924)	An example of a pre-2011 state flag with more saturated colors

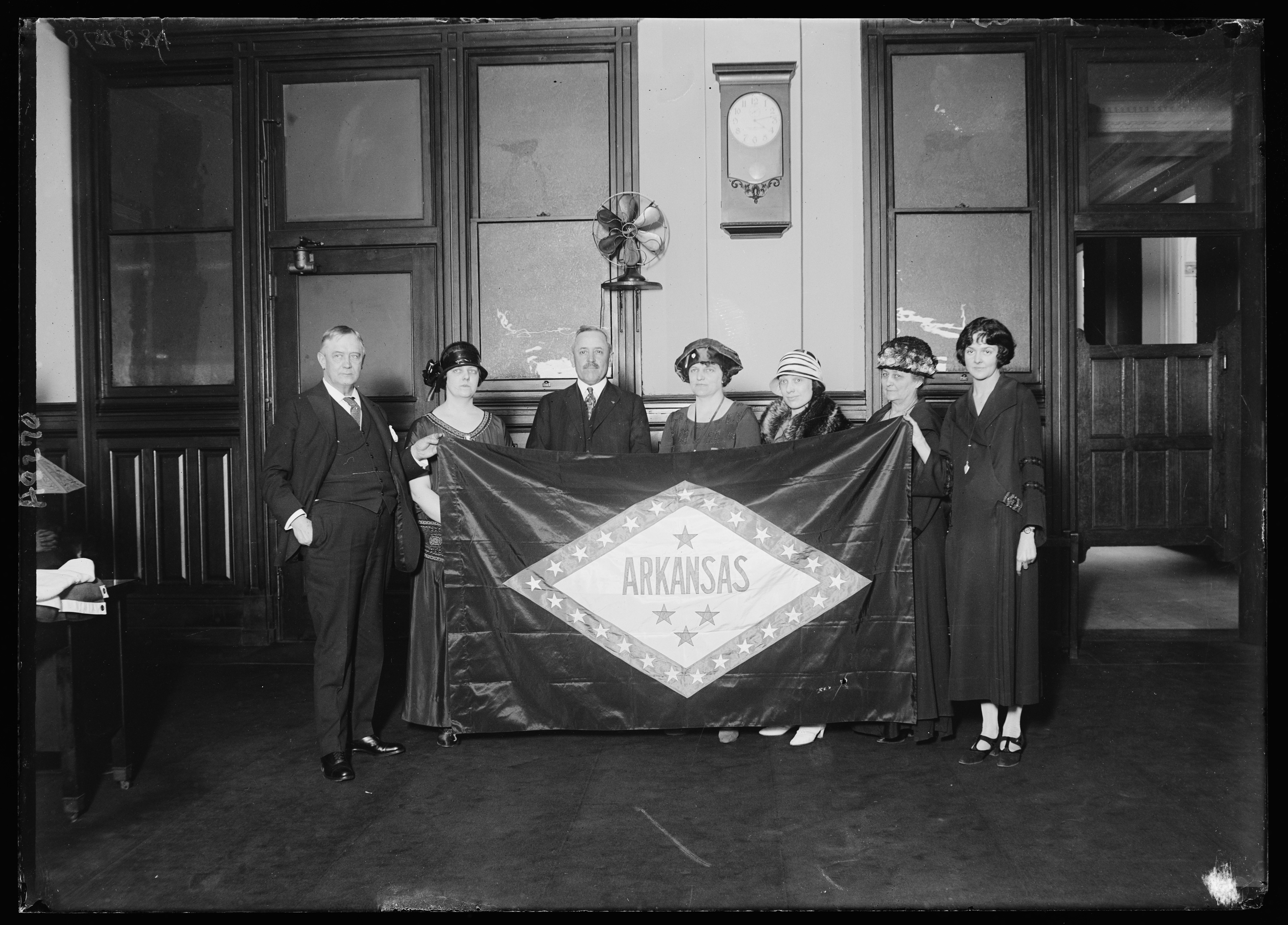
Presentation of the state flag, 1924

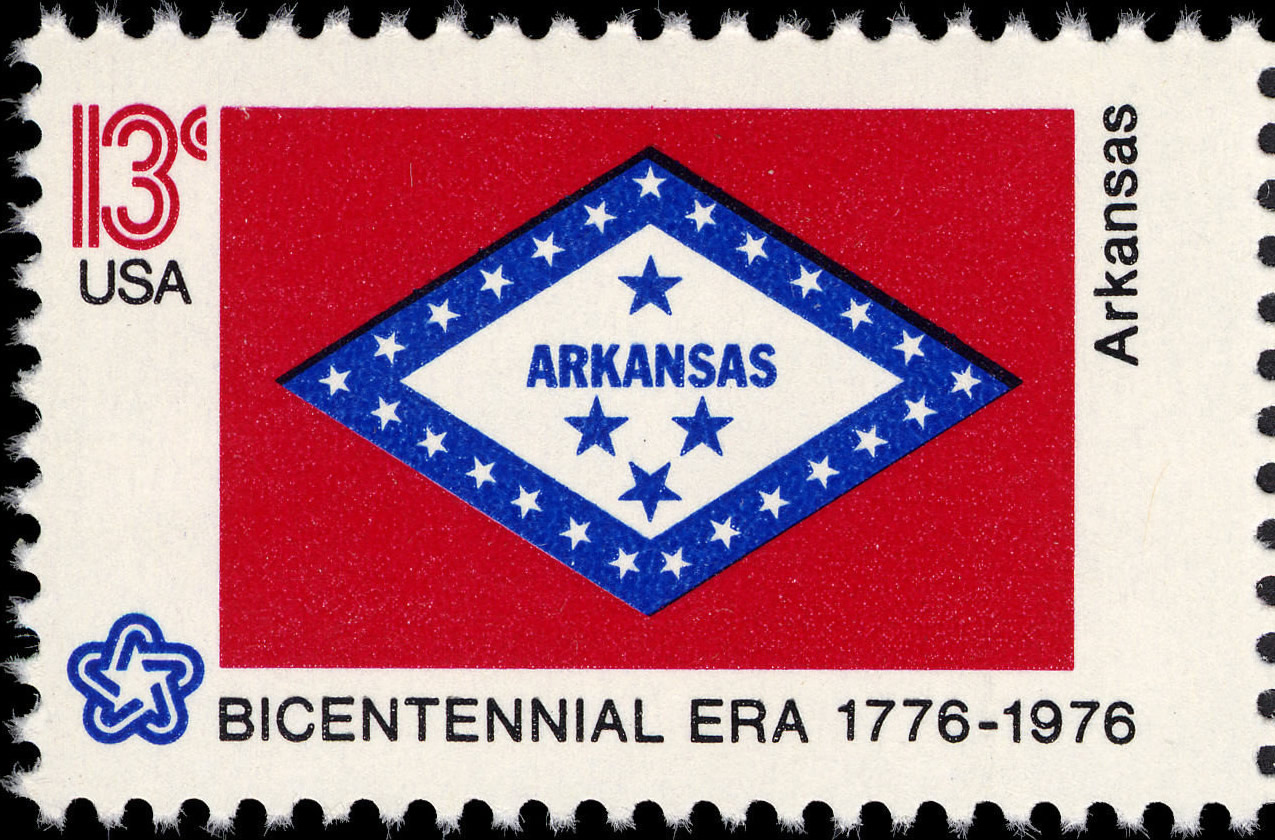
The Arkansas state flag as depicted in the 1976 bicentennial postage stamp series

== Salute ==
The law defining the flag also defines a text to be used in saluting the flag: "I salute the Arkansas Flag with its diamond and stars. We pledge our loyalty to thee." The salute was written by author Virginia Belcher Brock.

== See also ==
- List of Arkansas state symbols
- List of flags by design
- List of U.S. state, district, and territorial insignia
