= Legislative violence =

Violence in legislative bodies

Legislative violence is violence between members of a legislature, often physically, inside the legislature and triggered by divisive issues and tight votes. Such clashes have occurred in many countries, and notable incidents still happen.

== Overview ==
Although the sight of brawling politicians is incongruous with a legislature's stately image, its occupants, like in any other workplace, are still prone to stress and anger. The contentious nature of politics, regardless of their location, and the high stakes involved often add to the simmering tensions.

US Congressman Galusha A. Grow, no stranger to legislative violence, described the precursors thus:

Crowd some hundreds of men together on a hot afternoon or night; fill them with the fire of partisan ardor; perplex them with doubt as to the personal gain or loss that may follow their vote on the question at issue, and instill them with envy of, and ill-will toward, their fellows, and you have abundant material for a row. All that is needed is an excuse, and that is too often found.

== Causes ==
Some studies have analysed the causes of and repercussions of legislative violence. Co-author of "Making Punches Count: The Individual Logic of Legislative Brawls" surmised that when individual politicians engage in violence on the legislative floor, it is a calculated strategy. "[Politicians are] trying to send a message about themselves, who they are and what kind of person they are, to a specific target audience that can help them with their political career," co-author of the book Nathan F. Batto said.

== Afghanistan ==
=== 5 July 2011 ===
Nazifa Zaki and Hamida Ahmadzai fought in the chamber of the National Assembly over rocket attacks from Pakistan.

=== 19 May 2019 ===
MPs brawled over the election of a new speaker.

== Albania ==
On 20 November 2023, members of the opposition Democratic Party of Albania interrupted a parliamentary vote on the country's budget by lighting flares and piling chairs in the middle of the session hall as Prime Minister Edi Rama took his seat, causing a small fire that was immediately put out.

On 30 September 2024, Democratic Party MPs shoved microphones, hurled objects at the seats of the speaker and ministers and burned chairs in protest over the conviction of lawmaker Ervin Salianji for slander.

On 22 October 2026, opposition and government MPs clashed with each other inside the chamber over the Flamingo Revolution.

== Algeria ==
A tax bill raising rates on electricity, diesel fuel, and 3G cellular service sparked brawls in parliament on 30 November 2015.

== Ancient Rome ==
=== March 15, 44 BC ===
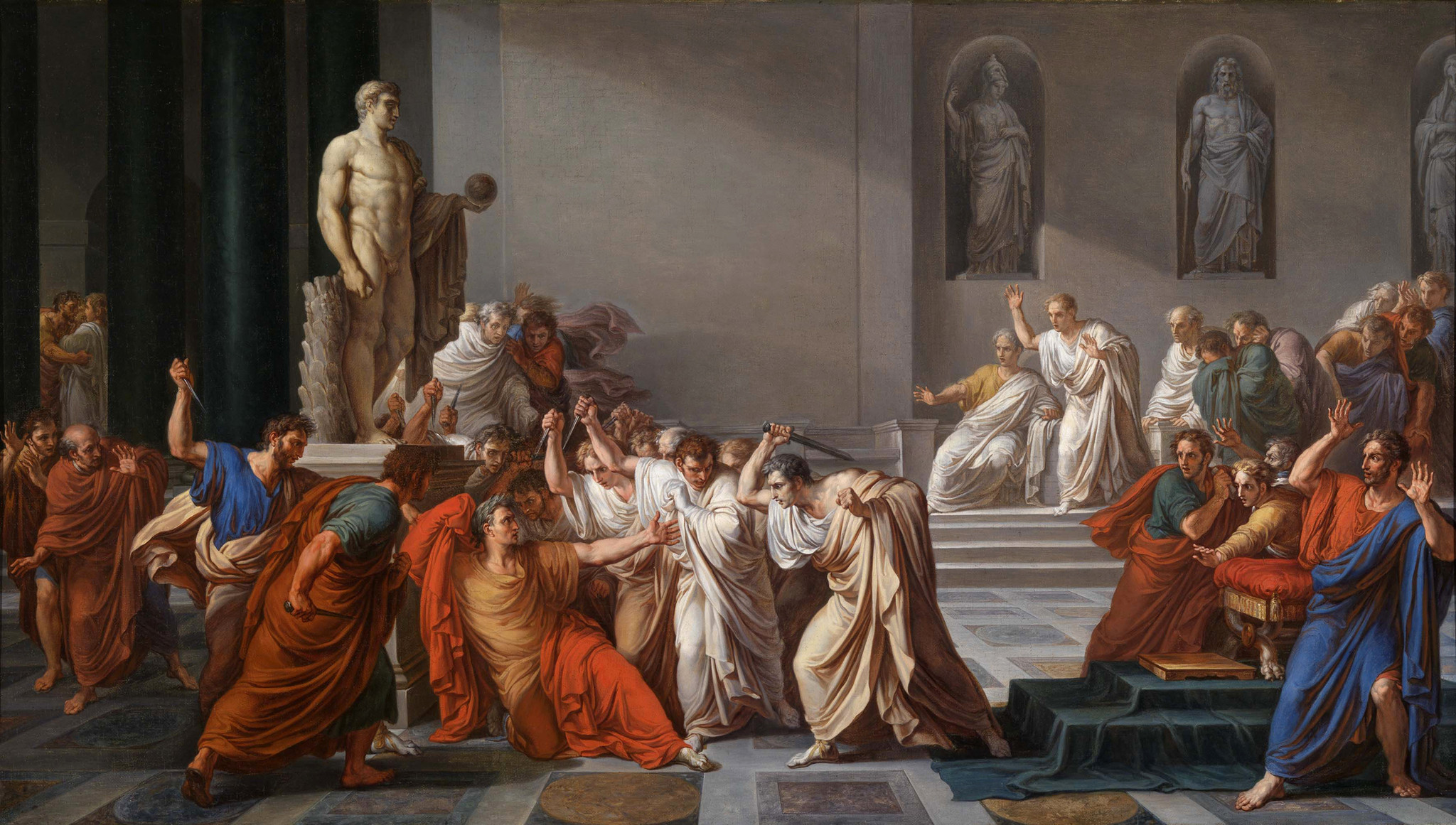
Morte de Césare (Death of Caesar) by Vincenzo Camuccini

General and dictator Julius Caesar was famously assassinated by a group of senators on the Ides of March, 44 BC, during a meeting of the Roman Senate. The senators, led by Cassius and Brutus and calling themselves Liberatores, had conspired in secret to kill Caesar and considered various ways to do so. Ultimately, they decided to kill him during a meeting of the senate since only senators would be allowed in the meeting, and Caesar would be alone. The senators drafted a fake petition requesting that Caesar hand over power to the Senate; Caesar called a meeting of the Senate to read it. When Caesar met the senators at the Theatre of Pompey, they stabbed him repeatedly with daggers concealed under their togas, killing him. Caesar's assassination led to a civil war for control of the republic, ending ultimately with the rise of Caesar Augustus and the founding of the Roman Empire.

== Armenia ==
Legislative violence has happened in Armenia.

On 8 July 2025, a brawl broke out in the National Assembly as lawmakers debated on whether to lift the parliamentary immunity of MP Artur Oniki Sargsyan.

On 29 October 2026, a brawl broke out in the National Assembly as MP Taron Chakhoyan of the ruling Civil Contract party recalled a pre-election statement made by a relative of Narek Karapetyan, an opposition leader from the Strong Armenia party. The statement concerned a proposal to establish a "ministry dedicated to pleasing women" should the opposition come to power—a claim that sparked controversy. Chakhoyan urged that the relative in question has yet to apologize for the aforementioned statement. Karapetyan initially responded from his seat, then aggressively approached the lectern, sparking a scuffle.

== Austria ==
During the era of the Dual Monarchy, the House of Deputies (German: Abgeordnetenhaus) of the Imperial Council (German: Reichsrat) of the Cisleithanian (i.e. Austrian) half of the Empire endured frequent outbursts of violence. Mark Twain, writing in Harper's in 1898, observed:

One night, while the customary pandemonium was crashing and thundering along at its best, a fight broke out. It was a surging, struggling, shoulder-to-shoulder scramble. A great many blows were struck. Twice Schönerer lifted one of the heavy ministerial fauteuils – some say with one hand – and threatened members of the Majority with it, but it was wrenched away from him; a member hammered Wolf over the head with the President's bell, and another member choked him; a professor was flung down and belabored with fists and choked; he held up an open penknife as a defense against the blows; it was snatched from him and flung to a distance; it hit a peaceful Christian Socialist who wasn't doing anything, and brought blood from his hand.

== Australia ==
On 13 February 2019, Brian Burston and his advisor James Ashby clashed in Parliament House after Burston and One Nation Party leader Pauline Hanson accused each other of sexual harassment.

== Bahamas ==
In 1965, the leader of the opposition threw the ceremonial mace in a protest for electoral reform, which became known as "Black Tuesday". In 2024, deputy leader of the opposition Shanendon Cartwright threw the ceremonial mace from a window in protest over Speaker Patricia Deveaux's refusal to allow Leader of the Opposition Michael Pintard in a session concerning drug trafficking. The ensuing scuffle left the deputy speaker hospitalised while a police officer was injured while Cartwright was being restrained.

== Bolivia ==
=== 27 October 2007 ===
In 2007, a fight broke out in the lower house of the Plurinational Legislative Assembly, the Chamber of Deputies. The fight erupted during a debate over whether or not to try four judges on corruption charges.

== Bosnia and Herzegovina ==
=== 31 July 2019 ===
Following an intense debate in the Council of the Bosnian-Podrinje Canton in Goražde, councilor Daliborka Milović, who was also the president of the Liberal Party, had thrown a plastic water bottle, hitting Edita Velić, a member of the Democratic Front, in the process, who was at the time, the chairman of the council, after a disagreement on drafting a new law. Following the event, Milović was promptly escorted out of the building by municipal police.

=== 23 December 2019 ===
Draško Stanivuković, a prominent member of the PDP, was initially scolded by Milorad Dodik's right-wing SNSD-dominated club for various acts aimed at the government of Republika Srpska. As an MP, Stanivuković became famous for flamboyant presentations of his ideas, which were deemed provocative. On that day, Stanivuković was physically assaulted by Dragan Lukač, the Interior Minister of Republika Srpska who was also an SNSD member. Moments before the confrontation, Lukač warned Stanivuković to cease his provocations aimed at the government, warning him that he would "end up on the floor, just like those little flags he brought along." Following his statement, Lukač had asked Stanivuković, who had by now been walking around the National Assembly hall carrying hand-held NATO flags and distributing them to those present, to approach him, calling him an "ape" in the process. Stanivuković did so, and following a brief exchange of words, Lukač hit him on the head with his right fist. The event was broadcast live on the public broadcaster RTRS. This happened in the wake of events where the Bosnian three-men presidency had unanimously agreed to sign the Reform Program, which was widely speculated to be the undisclosed SMO agreement, which would allow Bosnia and Herzegovina to pursue full membership in NATO. Following the event, Lukač apologized to the public but not Stanivuković.

== Brazil ==
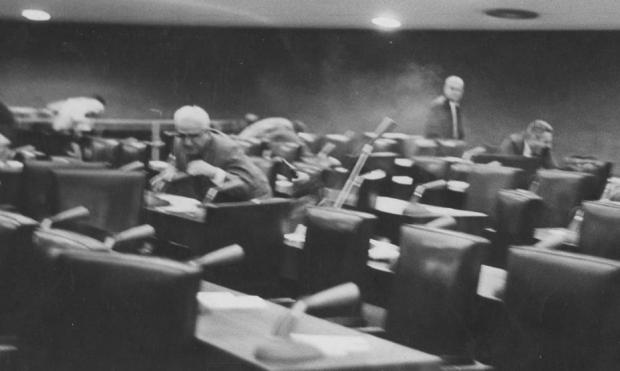
Photograph depicting the moment after the assassination

On 4 December 1963, the father of future president Fernando Collor de Mello and senator for Alagoas, Arnon de Melo, fired three shots with a .38 caliber revolver against Silvestre Péricles, Senator for Alagoas and Melo's political opponent, who had been threatening him with death. Pericles escaped from the shots, but two bullets hit the senator for Acre, José Kairala, hitting his abdomen. Kairala was quickly taken to a hospital in Brasília, but later died. Arnon de Melo remained in prison until July 1964, when he was acquitted by the Jury Court of Brasília, on the grounds that he had acted in self-defense.

== Canada ==
=== 4 February 1997 ===
Reform MP Darrel Stinson from British Columbia challenged Liberal MP John Cannis from Ontario, who had just moments prior heckled him and called him "racist" and hurled additional insults at him. He then proceeded to cross the floor but was intervened by fellow caucus Members and the Speaker called for Order.

=== 5 December 2012 ===
New Democratic Party House Leader Nathan Cullen attempted to delay the passing of a Conservative budget bill, leading to a threatening confrontation between Conservative Government House Leader Peter Van Loan and NDP leader Tom Mulcair, described in the media as a "near-brawl".

=== 18 May 2016 ===
Before a vote in the House of Commons, Prime Minister Justin Trudeau "manhandled" Conservative Party Opposition Whip Gord Brown and inadvertently elbowed NDP MP Ruth Ellen Brosseau. The incident went on to be known as "Elbowgate" and officially known in the House of Commons as "the matter of the physical molestation of the Member from Berthier—Maskinongé".

== Czech Republic ==
=== 21 May 2006 ===
Health Minister David Rath and his right-wing rival, Miroslav Macek, fought during a meeting of disgruntled dentists in Prague.

=== 21 January 2021 ===
Member of Parliament Lubomír Volný, leader of the far-right Unified – Alternative for Patriots, attacked Deputy Speaker Tomáš Hanzel during the debate on the extension of the state of emergency due to the COVID-19 pandemic. After being reprimanded by Hanzel for not speaking on the topic, Volný started to insult him, and when his microphone was turned off, he approached and confronted the Deputy Speaker, trying to use his microphone instead. Other deputies came to help Hanzel; the security guard eventually took away Volný.

== Egypt ==
=== 28 February 2016 ===
Kamal Ahmed threw a shoe at Tawfik Okasha during a session of parliament for hosting the Israeli ambassador Haim Koren.

=== 14 June 2017 ===
While geographer Sayed Al-Husseny was trying to explain that the Gaza Strip is a part of Egypt, MP Ahmed Tantawi went to the platform and broke Husseny's microphone.

== Estonia ==
On 5 February 1929, during a session of the Riigikogu, the Farmers' Assemblies accused Minister of Education and Welfare Leopold Johanson of Socialist Workers' Party of accepting bribes. Artur Tupits of the Farmers' Assemblies then slapped Johanson in the face twice until the two were separated. Disturbances continued on the next day. Tupits was then arrested for two months. His name inspired a new expression for a brawl in Estonian (tupitsat tegema, similar to the earlier expression tuupi tegema).

== European Parliament ==
In 1988, when Pope John Paul II addressed the European Parliament, hard-line Ulster loyalist Ian Paisley, then an MEP, denounced him as the Antichrist and was subjected to booing by fellow MEPs who also threw objects at him; Otto von Habsburg was among those who helped physically eject Paisley from the room.

Mike Hookem punched Steven Woolfe in the face at a UK Independence Party conference in 2016.

== Georgia ==
On 11 December 2013 Georgian Dream Party clashed with Georgia's United National Movement over a resolution to voice support for anti-government protesters in Ukraine.

On 26 December 2014, a brawl broke out following an argument over the composition of Georgian delegations in international institutions.

On 15 April 2024, during a debate over the controversial "foreign agents" bill, the leader of the ruling Georgian Dream party's parliamentary faction, Mamuka Mdinaradze, was punched in the face while speaking at the dispatch box by opposition MP Aleko Elisashvili.

On 26 June 2026, a fistfight between lawmakers erupted in parliament during a question-and-answer session after the annual report of the government was delivered by Prime Minister Irakli Kobakhidze.

=== Abkhazia ===
On 19 December 2024, lawmaker Adgur Kharazia fatally shot his colleague Vakhtang Golandzia and injured another MP, Kan Kvarchia, inside the People's Assembly of Abkhazia before escaping from the scene.

== Germany ==
On 10 March 1950, after having been expelled from the Bundestag for an anti-Semitic speech calling the resistance against Nazi Germany as traitors and general unruly behavior, Wolfgang Hedler did not leave the building. Herbert Wehner, Rudolf-Ernst Heiland and some other members of the SPD found him in a break room giving interviews and repeating what he was banned for, leading to them attacking him. While fleeing, Hedler fell through a glass door and down the stairs and got a laceration on the head. Hedler was a member of the far-right German Party and was a member of the NSDAP during the Nazi era. Wehner, Heiland and the other SPD Members were expelled from the Bundestag for ten days as punishment.

== Greece ==
On 15 May 2017, Ilias Kasidiaris was ejected from the Hellenic Parliament after verbally abusing Nikos Dendias for walking in front of him while the former was speaking during a session of the Economic Affairs Committee. Other MPs alleged that Kasidiaris physically assaulted Dendias as well.

On 24 April 2024, Konstantinos Floros attacked Vassilis Grammenos during the discussion on the lifting of immunity of Greek Solution leader Kyriakos Velopoulos following a defamation lawsuit filed by Floros’ father.

== Hong Kong ==
In 2014, pan-democrat lawmaker Wong Yuk-man threw a glass at Chief Executive CY Leung before a Hong Kong Legislative Council meeting and was charged with common assault. In another incident, two lawmakers who entered the Legislative Council's chamber without authorization caused a scuffle, and then the lawmakers tried to read out their oath of office.

== India ==
=== Tamil Nadu ===
In January 1988, a riot broke out in the Tamil Nadu Legislative Assembly over a vote of majority for V. N. Janaki, who was serving as Chief Minister following the death in December 1987 of her husband M. G. Ramachandran. The All India Anna Dravida Munnetra Kazhagam (ADMK) had split, with most MLAs supporting her and some supporting Jayalalithaa's bid to become Chief Minister instead. The Indian National Congress with its 60 MLAs was able to play "kingmaker". While the Congress-led Central Government in New Delhi ordered them to vote against Janaki, some Congress MLAs chose to resign instead, allowing the Janaki government to survive the majority vote. A riot ensued in the legislature, with members clubbing each other with microphone stands and footwear, which was finally ended by riot police who stormed the legislature and beat up everybody with their batons. The Janaki faction was, however, dismissed by the Central Government under Article 356 of the Indian Constitution, having survived just 24 days in office. The state was placed under President's rule for a year, until the next scheduled state assembly elections in January 1989.

On 25 March 1989, a riot broke out in the state legislative assembly between members of the ruling Dravida Munnetra Kazhagam party and the now-unified opposition ADMK over the reading of the state budget. In the melee, Durai Murugan tried to disrobe J. Jayalalithaa, Muthuvel Karunanidhi had his sunglasses broken, and angry rioters tore up the budget.

=== Uttar Pradesh ===
On 21 October 1997, a riot broke out in the Uttar Pradesh Legislative Assembly with MLAs picking up microphones, chairs, and other items to throw at each other. Security pulled off the tops of desks as a shield for the Speaker.

=== Maharashtra ===
Abu Azmi, a member of the Maharashtra Legislature was assaulted on 10 November 2009 in the state assembly. The incident occurred after Azmi, who could not speak Marathi, took the oath in Urdu instead. This was objected to by the right-wing Maharashtra Navnirman Sena (MNS), which wanted Marathi to be the official language in the state. Four MNS members were suspended for four years for disrupting the legislature's proceedings.

== Iran ==
Scuffles broke out in the Islamic Consultative Assembly after the country's economic and finance minister Masoud Karbasian was sacked in 2018.

== Iraq ==
There has been violence in the Council of Representatives of Iraq.

Kurdish MPs brawled in the Kurdistan Region Parliament over president Masoud Barzani's term.

== Israel ==
=== Knesset ===
In 1992, in the aftermath of the First Intifada, Jewish and Arab MKs fought in the Knesset over child support payments.

In 2010, a fight broke out after Balad MK Haneen Zoabi had called Israel Defense Forces soldiers "murderers". Far-right MKs began shouting for her to be deported to the Hamas-controlled Gaza Strip, and Mickey Levy ordered the Knesset's ushers to forcibly remove her from the floor. She returned after claiming to chair Hamad Amar that she wanted to apologize, only to be removed again and become the target of more violence after condemning the blockade of the Gaza Strip and calling for another Gaza flotilla raid. Numerous MKs were removed from the plenum or faced discipline from the Knesset Ethics Committee for the incident. On behalf of the Likud government, Ofir Akunis condemned the "insane incitement" but called Zoabi a "traitor", "terrorist", and "neo-fascist" for her speech. The Likud government tried to disqualify Zoabi for reelection by the Central Elections Committee for the incident, but was prevented by the Supreme Court of Israel.

In 2012, Yisrael Beiteinu MK Anastassia Michaeli threw water at HaAvoda MK Raleb Majadele.

In 2017, Ksenia Svetlova was caught writing in lipstick on Leah Fadida's window. That same year, Michal Biran and Haneen Zoabi called Oren Hazan "a pimp".

In 2019, Oren Hazan and Ayelet Nahmias-Verbin had a shouting match in the Knesset parking lot.

=== Local legislatures ===
Fights broke out in the Givatayim City Hall in 2003 and 2010.

== Italy ==
On 29 September 1919, during the debate about the annexation of Fiume opposed by Prime Minister Francesco Saverio Nitti, the Italian parliament was dissolved after Foreign Minister Tommaso Tittoni withdrew and fights erupted in the Chamber of Deputies.

During the inaugural session of the XXVI legislature on 13 June 1921, communist deputy Francesco Misiano was attacked inside the Palazzo Montecitorio, the seat of the Chamber of Deputies, by about thirty newly elected fascist deputies led by Silvio Gai and Giuseppe Bottai, beaten and forced to leave Parliament. In early December Misiano was again assaulted by fascist deputies in parliament and had to be protected by his communist colleagues. The fascists called in other deputies to walk out if the chamber when Misiano entered it, and many non-fascists did so.

A brawl broke out in the Italian Parliament in 2010 over an issue of funding for new youth social centres.

Another brawl broke out in the Chamber of Deputies during a vote on proposals to strengthen regional autonomy in 2024.

== Japan ==
A brawl broke out in the National Diet on 17 September 2015 after the House of Councillors approved legislation for the controversial security bills that would allow the country to send Japan Self-Defense Forces troops to fight abroad for the first time since World War II. Members of the opposition Democratic Party of Japan tried to grab the microphone and stop Masahisa Sato, acting chairman of the upper house special committee, from carrying out the vote.

== Jordan ==
There has been violence during sessions of parliament, including one instance where a member was removed from the building after he fired an AK-47 from the hall at a fellow MP.

== Kenya ==
Lawmakers came to blows in the parliament chamber over a proposed security bill in 2014 while police arrested protesters outside the building.

Wajir East lawmaker Rashid Kassim Amin assaulted Wajir Women Representative Fatuma Gedi.

== Kosovo ==
=== 11 March 2016 ===
Opposition politicians released tear gas in parliament to obstruct a session in Parliament.

=== 13 July 2023 ===
While Prime Minister Albin Kurti was speaking about measures to defuse tensions with ethnic Serbs in the north, water was thrown at him, and a brawl broke out.

=== 8 August 2026 ===
During a plenary session of parliament, opposition lawmaker Time Kadrijaj threw eggs at acting Prime Minister Albin Kurti.

== Kuwait ==
On 16 June 2016, a shoe fight started after Hamdan El-Azmi expressed his opposition to the government, presenting an amendment to the distribution of electoral constituencies in a new municipal law.

== Lebanon ==
On 5 October 2015, lawmakers brawled over disputes during a parliamentary committee meeting on energy shortages.

== Maldives ==
On 28 January 2024, a brawl broke out in the People's Majlis over the appointment of three cabinet members.

== Mexico ==
On 1 December 2006, hours before the scheduled oath of office ceremony for President Felipe Calderón in the Legislative Palace, the Congress of the Union erupted in a brawl. The incident was broadcast on live television. Despite this, the ceremony took place. Calderón entered the Congress chamber through a back door directly onto the podium and, in a quick ceremony, took the Oath of Office amid jeers. Then, after singing the national anthem, which silenced the opposition for a while, he took a quick exit rather than deliver his inaugural address to Congress (the traditional follow-up to the oath-taking).

On 27 August 2025, PRI leader Alito Moreno brawled with Senate president Gerardo Fernández Noroña (MORENA) after Moreno accused the latter of not allowing him to speak following that day's session.

On 28 May 2026, MORENA deputy Zenyazen Escobar García scuffled with PRI deputy Carlos Gutiérrez Mancilla inside the Chamber of Deputies after Gutiérrez called him a "damn stripper" and other opposition deputies accused him of being inebriated.

== Morocco ==
On 11 October 2014, Hamid Chabat scuffled with Aziz Lebbar.

== Nepal ==
A brawl broke out in the Federal Parliament in 2015 during a debate over the country's new constitution.

== Nigeria ==
=== 22 June 2010 ===
A fight broke out in the National Assembly after a group of members were suspended for accusing the speaker of corruption.

=== 18 September 2013 ===
Politicians were involved in a fight after a group from the People's Democratic Party (PDP) tried to address parliament.

== North Macedonia ==
In 2014, the Democratic Party of Albanians announced it was boycotting parliament after a fist fight broke out in the chamber between its members Orhan Ibrahimi and Rexhail Ismaili from the ruling Democratic Union for Integration.

== Pakistan ==
=== 26 January 2017 ===
The National Assembly of Pakistan witnessed violence when members of the ruling Pakistan Muslim League (N) and the opposition Pakistan Tehreek-e-Insaf came to blows with one another over the Panama Papers case. Amid scuffles and heated arguments, MPs slapped, kicked, and pushed each other in a rare clash in the house.

=== 6 November 2018 ===
Elected members of the ruling hall were caught on camera pushing, manhandling, and even dealing blows at each other.

The focus of the fight was Asia Bibi, a woman saved from hanging by a ruling of the Supreme Court of Pakistan, which ordered her release after she spent eight years on death row for conviction under blasphemy laws.

=== 4 February 2021 ===
Parliament descended into violence, with the Opposition and treasury benches brawling each other. Later, three members were issued show-cause notices regarding their involvement in the "unpleasant incident" during parliamentary proceedings.

== Peru ==
=== 28 June 1988 ===
When Peru had a bicameral legislature, member of congress Rómulo León (APRA) tried to grab and punch his colleague Fernando Olivera (FIM) after Olivera accused him of having secret bank accounts in a Swiss bank. He was suspended for 120 days from Congress.

=== 27 August 1998 ===
After President Alberto Fujimori dissolved Congress and approved a unicameral legislature, Congressman Javier Diez Canseco (PS) decided to finish a heated discussion with a Fujimorist congressman with a punch in the jaw. He was suspended for 120 days from the legislature for the act.

=== 26 July 2000 ===
On the oath day, Congressmen threw coins at their colleague Roger Cáceres because they accused him of being a turncoat for moving to the government party Peru 2000. His son Roger Cáceres Pérez (also a Congressman) insulted the coin throwers.

=== August 2006 ===
Union for Peru Congresswomen Nancy Obregón and Elsa Malpartida did not approve the Peru–United States Trade Promotion Agreement. For that reason, they tried to escape by punching and kicking Congress security. They were suspended for 120 days from the legislature for their acts.

=== 19 May 2011 ===
Congressman Víctor Andrés García Belaúnde (AP) accused his colleague Luis Wilson (PAP) of having his relatives work for a national hospital with high salaries. Wilson denied García Belaúnde's accusations, then went to his desk, started insulting him, and tried to fight with him, but his colleagues prevented it.

== Philippines ==
=== Senate ===
In September 2016, Senator Antonio Trillanes IV turned off the microphone of his colleague Alan Peter Cayetano during a televised hearing on the Philippine war on drugs and engaged in January 2017 with Senator Migz Zubiri in near fistfighting, after the Kilusang Pagbabago Coalition Members rejected Trillanes' resolution for an investigation for the Bureau of Immigration bribery scandal.

In September 2024, both Zubiri and Cayetano nearly engaged in a fistfight due to Cayetano's last minute introduction of a resolution on the Makati–Taguig boundary dispute.

=== House of Representatives ===
In the lower house, representatives Emilio Cortez and Ramon Durano engaged in a fistfight during debates over the passage of the Rizal Law in 1956.

In October 2016, Representative Prospero Pichay Jr. got into a heated argument with fellow legislator Ace Barbers during a hearing over constitutional amendments. After the hearing was suspended, Barbers walked towards Pichay. Reporters covering the forum overheard the two congressmen hurl expletives at each other. Barbers then pointed at the face of Pichay, who was seated. Pichay pushed away the other lawmaker's hand, then stood up. Their colleagues quickly stood between them as they tried to push each other and managed to break up the fight.

In September 2024, Representatives Rodante Marcoleta and Joseph Stephen Paduano made threatening gestures against each other before being restrained by other lawmakers during an argument over a House investigation into Vice President Sara Duterte.

== Romania ==
On 21 May 2024, Florin Roman, a lawmaker of the National Liberal Party attacked Dan Vîlceanu, an independent deputy.

== Senegal ==
On 1 December 2022, a pregnant member of the National Assembly, Amy Ndiaye was involved in a fight with two fellow MPs in the chamber while it was in session involving kicking and slapping. Mamadou Niang and Massata Samb were sentenced to six months in prison and ordered to pay Ndiaye five million CFA franc in compensation.

== Serbia ==
On 4 March 2025, a brawl broke out in the National Assembly after opposition parties demanded the confirmation of the resignation of Prime Minister Miloš Vučević and his government during a debate on a bill to increase funding for university education. Three MPs were injured.

== South Africa ==
=== 17 May 2016 ===
Members of the Economic Freedom Fighters engaged in a brawl with security guards after attempting to prevent President Jacob Zuma from addressing parliament.

=== 5 April 2019 ===
Before the 2019 general election, members of the EFF and Black First Land First parties began hitting each other and throwing chairs.

== South Korea ==
There have been several events of legislative violence in the National Assembly of South Korea; often, the politicians who are involved in such violence do not receive criminal penalties under civil laws.

=== 22 September 1966 ===
During an interpellation session on saccharin smuggling, Korea Independence Party legislator Kim Du-han threw feces on cabinet members. His membership was terminated, and he received a jail sentence.

=== 2 March 1998 ===
During a vote to approve Kim Jong-pil as prime minister, Grand National Party legislators submitted blank ballots to demonstrate their disapproval. A fight broke out after supporters of the Democratic ruling coalition of President Kim Dae-jung demanded that the vote be declared void.

=== 12 March 2004 ===
During a National Assembly vote on the motion to impeach President Roh Moo-hyun, supporters of the president openly clashed with opposition MPs for 20 minutes to stop the vote (which was in favor of impeachment) from being finalized.

=== 22 July 2009 ===
A brawl broke out as the National Assembly passed three bills on reforming the media industry. Opposition MPs blocked Speaker Kim Hyong-o from entering the room to pass the bills while both sides clashed. The bills were eventually passed by the Deputy Speaker.

=== 8 December 2010 ===
A brawl broke out as the Grand National Party forcefully passed the year 2011 budget bill in advance without the presence of opposition parties.

=== 22 November 2011 ===
A brawl broke out as the National Assembly ratified the country's United States–Korea Free Trade Agreement. Opposition lawmakers used tear gas in the parliament. The ruling Grand National Party managed to force it through.

== Sri Lanka ==
Legislative violence has happened in the Parliament of Sri Lanka.

== Suriname ==
On 13 December 2007, Chair of the National Assembly Paul Somohardjo (PL) and representatives Ronnie Brunswijk (ABOP) and Rashied Doekhi (NDP) were involved in a fistfight on the assembly floor after the latter accused Somohardjo of involvement with alleged corruption at the Ministry of Spatial Planning.

== Taiwan ==
The Taiwanese Legislative Yuan is the most notable modern example of legislative violence. In the history of the Legislative Yuan, numerous violent acts have occurred during parliamentary sessions. It is popularly referred to locally as "Legislator Brawling" (Taiwanese Mandarin: 立委群毆、立委全武行). In 1995, the Legislative Yuan was presented with the Ig Nobel Prize Peace Award, for "demonstrating that politicians gain more by punching, kicking and gouging each other than by waging war against other nations".

=== 7 April 1988 ===
The first recorded brawl in the history of the Legislative Yuan. While speaker Liu Kuo-tsai was counting votes on a budget proposal that passed, Ju Gau-jeng jumped onto the speaker's podium, followed by Jaw Shaw-kong, who was attempting to stop Ju. Throughout the altercation, Liu continued counting votes.

=== 28 March 2001 ===
Lo Fu-chu scuffled with Diane Lee during a committee meeting.

=== 23 March 2004 ===
A serious scuffle broke out between the ruling Democratic Progressive Party (DPP) and opposition Kuomintang (KMT) members after an argument over vote recounts from the presidential election, when opposition leader Lien Chan accused President Chen Shui-bian of rigging the vote.

=== 7 May 2004 ===
Legislators Chu Hsing-yu and William Lai got into a brawl over legislative procedures. TV cameras showed Chu grabbing Lai and trying to wrestle him onto a desk. He then tried to headbutt his colleague before jabbing him in the stomach. The brawl resulted in having a traffic policeman called into the chamber to test Chu's alcohol level after he was accused of being drunk. The tests showed no sign of alcohol influence.

=== 26 October 2004 ===
During a debate on a military hardware purchase ordinance, the opposition and ruling party engaged in a food fight after a disagreement broke out.

=== 30 May 2006 ===
Taiwanese DPP deputy Wang Shu-hui chewing up a proposal to halt voting on direct transport links with the People's Republic of China.

Amid a proposal about creating direct transport links with the People's Republic of China, DPP deputy Wang Shu-hui snatched the written proposal and shoved it into her mouth. Opposition members failed to get her to cough it up by pulling her hair. She later spat the proposal out and tore it up. This was the third time the DPP's actions stopped a vote over the issue.

During the incident another DPP member, Chuang Ho-tzu, spat at an opposition member.

=== 8 May 2007 ===
Two dozen members overwhelmed the Speaker's podium, which became a free-for-all between the ruling DPP and opposition KMT with punches and sprayed water, requiring at least one hospitalization. The fight was over an alleged delay in the annual budget.

=== 25 June 2013 ===
Angry legislators wrestled, splashed water, and bit each other in a brawl over a controversial capital gains tax on share trading.

=== 13 to 14 July 2017 ===
Legislators brawled on two consecutive days over a controversial $420 billion infrastructure spending plan. The opposition (headed by the KMT) said the plan would benefit cities and counties faithful to President Tsai Ing-wen's ruling party, the DPP. They also said the plan was devised to secure support for the DPP ahead of the 2018 regional elections.

On 13 July, Premier Lin Chuan was prevented from delivering his report on the budget after a water balloon was thrown towards him. This resulted in him leaving the chamber and causing the session to halt. The following day, opposition lawmakers occupied the chamber. They raised large padded office chairs above their heads, surrounded the podium, and grappled with rival legislators to prevent Lin from presenting the report again as water balloons were thrown. This resulted in the early suspension of the parliamentary session.

=== 27 November 2020 ===
Legislators from the KMT threw pig guts and brawled with other lawmakers as they tried to stop Premier Su Tseng-chang from taking questions regarding the easing of US pork imports.

=== 20 May 2024 ===
A brawl broke out after the KMT-dominated Legislative Yuan voted in favor of highly controversial legislative reform bills. Chung Chia-pin, Chiu Chih-wei, Chuang Jui-hsiung, Puma Shen and Wu Tsung-hsien were hospitalized following the incident.

=== 20 December 2024 ===
A brawl broke out after KMT lawmakers tried to regain control over the Speaker's chair, which had been occupied overnight by DPP lawmakers trying to prevent the passage of legislative reform bills.

== Thailand ==
There has been legislative violence in the National Assembly of Thailand.

== Tonga ==
In August 2025, two Legislative Assembly members, Police Minister Paula Piukala and the Chairman of the whole House Committee Lord Malakai Fakatoufifita, were suspended after physically fighting during a parliament debate. Tu'ilakepa had interrupted a speech by Piukala, leading to a fistfight between the two men. They were restrained by other MPs.

== Tunisia ==
=== 16 January 2019 ===
There have been violent clashes between members of the Assembly of the Representatives of the People.

=== 7 December 2020 ===
Members of the far-right Dignity Coalition assaulted lawmakers from the Democratic Bloc. One MP had a bleeding face; another appeared unconscious. The reason for the fight reportedly was a misogynistic statement by Karama's deputy, Mohammed Affes, from the week before.

=== 18 June 2021 ===
Abir Moussi, the outspoken leader of the opposition Free Destourian Party, was slapped and kicked as she was filming a parliamentary session on her mobile phone.

== Turkey ==
There has been legislative violence during Grand National Assembly sessions, including:

- Mehmet Fevzi Şıhanlıoğlu died of a heart attack during a fistfight in 2001.
- Politicians fought over cram schooling in 2014.
- Five politicians, including Mahmut Tanal and Ertuğrul Kürkçü, were injured during a fight over police powers in 2015.
- Fatma Kaplan Hürriyet was filming a debate using her mobile phone when Mustafa Elitaş strangled her in 2017.
- Politicians fought during debates over a Constitutional Commission in 2016.
- Politicians fought over constitutional amendments in 2017.
- Aylin Nazlıaka, Gökcen Özdoğan Enç, Şafak Pavey, Burcu Çelik Özkan, Pervin Buldan and Melike Basmacı were injured during the first female fight in Parliament in 2017.
- Müslüm Doğan and Mahmut Toğrul had to seek medical attention after a parliamentary row over the cross-border offensive on Afrin, Syria in 2018 took a violent turn.
- A fistfight erupted in parliament in 2018 after lawmakers approved changes to the country's electoral rules that critics say are aimed at helping President Recep Tayyip Erdoğan consolidate power.
- MPs fought over HDP lawmaker Ahmet Şık's speech.
- AKP lawmaker Salih Cora punched HDP lawmaker Tuma Çelik during a brawl.
- Garo Paylan, a member of the HDP, was attacked by AKP members as the parliament's Constitutional Commission was debating whether to strip pro-Kurdish deputies of their immunity.
- During a meeting in Ankara with metropolitan municipality officials, mayor Mansur Yavaş interrupted his speech and abandoned the lectern in an attempt to prevent a confrontation between the AKP, CHP, MHP and İYİ Party councilors in 2019.
- MPs fought over the military intervention in Idlib in the Syrian Civil War in 2020.
- A fight broke out between MPs during a debate on government control over the appointment of judicial officials.
- A brawl between female MPs erupted in 2021 during budget talks after ruling AKP deputy Bahar Ayvazoğlu targeted the main opposition CHP MPs and its leader Kemal Kılıçdaroğlu throughout her speech.
- A fight broke out in 2022 over next year's budget.
- A fight broke out during a debate regarding the eligibility of imprisoned MP Can Atalay to assume his seat.
- A brawl erupted after MHP deputy Olcay Kılavuz insulted former HDP co-chair Selahattin Demirtaş.
- A brawl erupted in 2026 over the appointment of Akın Gürlek as justice minister.

== Uganda ==
On 26 September 2017, members of parliament brawled during a plenary session after the parliament speaker allowed a constitutional amendment to be presented to MPs. The amendment centered on the age-limit issue on the re-election of President Yoweri Museveni, who was then 73 years old, and the limit for re-election was capped at 75. A member stood on a table and threw a chair at the flag of the president and was pulled down and punched up. Metal sticks and chairs were used as weapons. Museveni was allowed to campaign in the 2021 Ugandan general election.

== Ukraine ==
Fights in the Verkhovna Rada are frequent, and Verkhovna Rada meetings are often called a "government boxing match". The Verkhovna Rada has no regulations nor traditions against unparliamentary language, and brawls are very common in the chamber due to the high number of insults and extreme actions in the chamber (e.g., accusations of dishonesty, corruption, embezzlement, and treason).

=== 27 April 2010 ===
A debate on extending Russia's lease of the Sevastopol Naval Base in the Black Sea in exchange for a €30 billion discount on Russian natural gas descended into a mass brawl, involving smoke bombs, eggs and general fighting among members. The Chairman of the Rada, Volodymyr Lytvyn, had two umbrellas placed in a defensive position in front of his microphone as dozens of eggs were thrown against him, but continued his address to the chamber without displaying any discomfort.

=== 16 December 2010 ===
Fights broke out after Batkivshchyna lawmakers blocked the Rada's podium and Party of Regions lawmakers attempted to take it back by force. The scuffle resulted in six opposition deputies having to be hospitalized. Rada Chairman Lytvyn later displayed chains and iron bars which he alleged some lawmakers had brought into the building to use as weapons.

=== 24 May 2012 ===
Violent scuffles broke out during a debate over a bill allowing the official use of the Russian language in parts of the country, resulting in lawmaker Mykola Petruk being taken to hospital after suffering a blow to his head.

=== 12–13 December 2012 ===
On 12 December, a mass brawl broke out over voting protocol in place of absent deputies during the first session of the Rada appointed after the previous parliamentary election. Fighting continued the following day, after deputies had backed Mykola Azarov for a second term as Prime Minister.

=== 19 March 2013 ===
Clashes broke out when the parliamentary leader of President Viktor Yanukovych's Party of Regions, accused deputies from far right Svoboda of being neo-fascists after they booed a speech he made in Russian.

=== 14 August 2014 ===
Two lawmakers, Oleh Lyashko and Oleksandr Shevchenko, got into an argument on the floor. Shevchenko accused Lyashko, who had built an image as a combative opponent of pro-Russian separatists, of never having visited the separatist eastern region. The argument eventually led to Shevchenko punching Lyashko in the face.

=== 11 December 2015 ===
Petro Poroshenko Bloc deputy Oleh Barna presented flowers to then-Prime Minister Arseniy Yatsenyuk during the latter's address, and then tried to physically carry him away from the podium, leading to a fight.

=== 14 November 2016 ===
Yuriy Boyko, of the centre-left Opposition Bloc, punched Oleh Lyashko in the face after the right-wing Radical Party member purportedly accused him of being a "Kremlin agent".

=== 20 December 2018 ===
A brawl broke out after opposition politician Nestor Shufrych tore down a poster of oligarch and politician Viktor Medvedchuk with the slogan "Putin's agent Medvedchuk must face trial".

=== 5 December 2019 ===
The first fight of the 9th Verkhovna Rada occurred between Maksym Buzhanskyi and Geo Leros, both Servant of the People deputies, over an alleged insult by the former toward Iryna Vereshchuk (another Servant of the People deputy) in an internal faction group chat. European Solidarity politician Iryna Herashchenko reported that Leros apparently dragged Buzhanskyi into the European Solidarity section of the Rada during the fight, after which European Solidarity deputies stopped him.

=== 11 December 2019 ===
Servant of the People deputy Andriy Bohdanets and Eduard Leonov of the nationalist Svoboda Party exchanged punches when a parliamentary decision began debating a draft bill allowing for the privatization of agricultural land, an issue that was supported by International Monetary Fund and the European Court of Human Rights. The Svoboda Party has long opposed the issue in fear of foreigners buy up land. Bohdanets was admitted to hospital with a suspected concussion.

=== 6 October 2023 ===
A fight broke out between former Servant of the People member Mykola Tyshchenko and European Solidarity deputy Oleksiy Honcharenko. Tyshchenko called Honcharenko a "rooster from Odesa" and read material from his Wikipedia article saying that Honcharenko had promoted the Russian language in Odesa in his earlier political career. Tyshchenko demanded that Honcharenko be removed from European Solidarity and from Ukrainian politics in general. This led to a fight where Honcharenko said his pants were torn, while other deputies recorded the fight on their phones.

== United Kingdom ==
In the House of Commons of the United Kingdom, the government and the opposition are separated by red lines drawn on the carpet. The red lines in front of the two sets of benches are two sword-lengths apart (or a little more than two sword-lengths apart); a Member is traditionally not allowed to cross the line during debates, supposedly because the Member might then be able to attack an individual on the opposite side. These procedures were made because the Members were allowed to carry weapons into the House in its founding days.

=== 4 April 1938 ===
During a debate about the Spanish Civil War, Conservative MP Robert Bower told Jewish Labour MP Emanuel Shinwell to "go back to Poland". Shinwell walked across the floor of the House and struck Bower in the face before turning to the Speaker, apologising, and walking out of the chamber. Bower also then apologised to the Speaker, and no disciplinary action was taken against either MP.

=== 31 January 1972 ===
During a dispute over the conduct of British Army soldiers on Bloody Sunday on the day before, Independent Socialist MP Bernadette Devlin punched the Conservative Party Home Secretary Reginald Maudling. Her aggression was in response to the comments made by Maudling, who was maintaining that the 1st Battalion, Parachute Regiment had fired at the protesters in self-defence, contrary to the testimonies of civilian eyewitnesses (including Devlin herself). She argued that she was being denied the right to speak. Her actions resulted in her being banned from the House of Commons of the United Kingdom for six months.

=== 27 May 1976 ===
In the aftermath of a rancorous debate with Labour MPs over the Aircraft and Shipbuilding Industries Bill, Conservative Michael Heseltine was enraged by a group who began singing The Red Flag. He seized the chamber's ceremonial mace and brandished it over his head but was restrained by Jim Prior, and after his departure, the sitting was suspended for the rest of the day.

=== 19 October 2022 ===
During opposition day, the Labour Party tabled a motion to ban fracking across the United Kingdom. A ban on fracking had been a key promise of the Conservative Party's winning 2019 general election manifesto under former leader Boris Johnson, and many Conservative MPs and voters were vocally opposed to fracking. However, Prime Minister Liz Truss, who had recently been elected party leader by the Conservative Party membership with only a minority of support from MPs, personally supported fracking and instructed MPs to vote against the proposal, claiming that the vote was a motion of confidence in the government and threatening that any Conservative MP who supported the ban would have the whip withdrawn (i.e., be expelled from the Parliamentary party and sit as an independent). Minutes before the vote took place, the Minister of State for Climate Graham Stuart announced that it was not a vote of confidence and he would support the ban. This led to chaos among Conservative MPs, and party whips are alleged to have physically manhandled MPs towards the "No" voting lobby, in one of the few examples of violence between members of the same party. The motion was defeated, but forty Conservative MPs abstained from the vote. Liz Truss resigned as leader of the Conservative Party the following day and was replaced as prime minister on 25 October 2022 by former Chancellor Rishi Sunak, after the shortest tenure in British political history. Sunak quickly reinstituted the government moratorium on fracking despite having previously voiced support for the practice.

== United States ==
=== 15 February 1798 ===
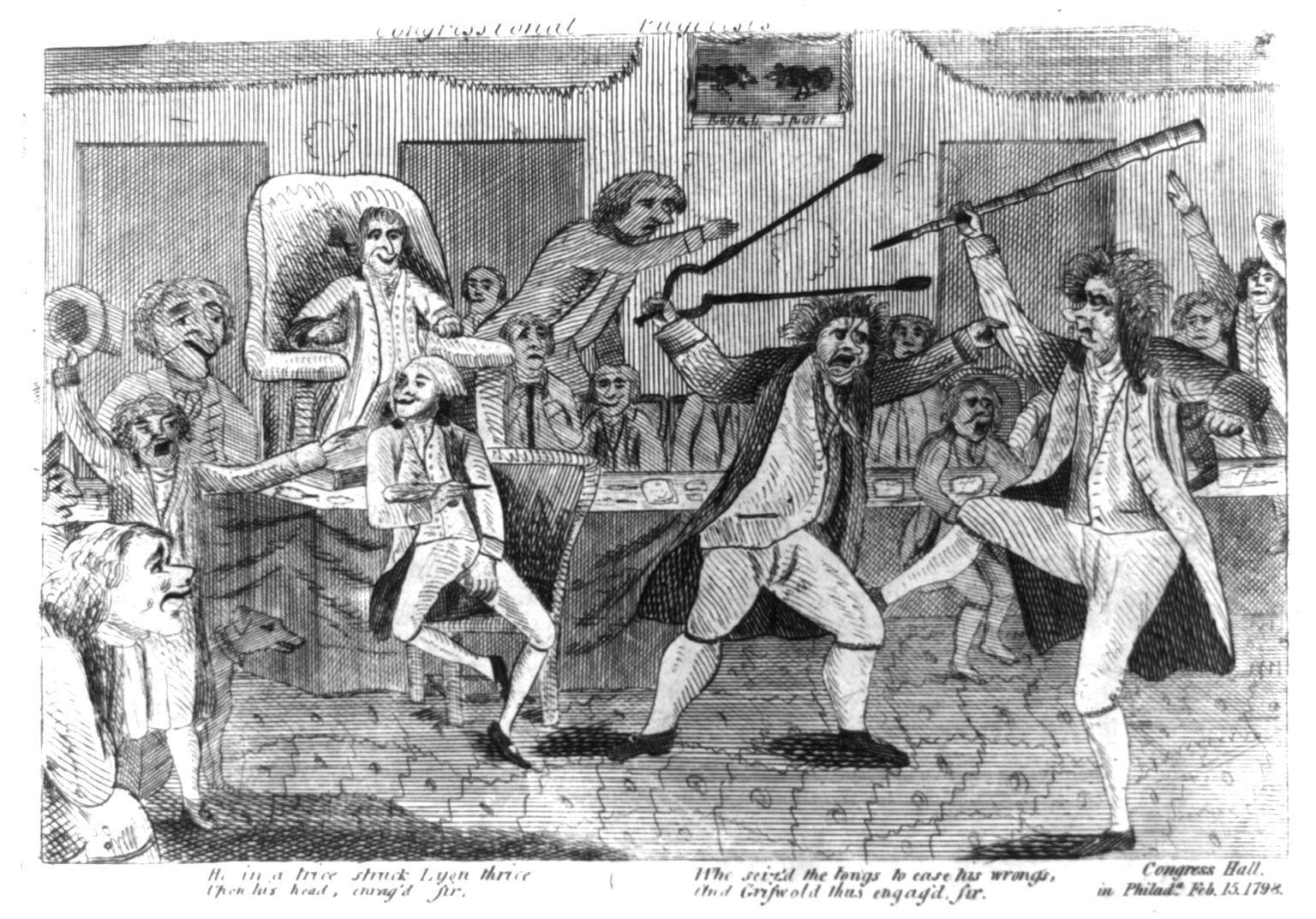
Congressional Pugilists, a 1798 political cartoon depicting the fight between Griswold and Lyon.

Federalist Congressman Roger Griswold of Connecticut attacked Democratic-Republican Party Representative Matthew Lyon of Vermont with a hickory walking stick in the chambers of the United States House of Representatives. Griswold struck Lyon repeatedly about the head, shoulders, and arms while Lyon attempted to shield himself from the blows. Lyon then turned and ran to the fireplace, took up a pair of metal tongs, and, having armed himself thus, returned to the engagement. Griswold then tripped Lyon and struck him in the face while he lay on the ground, at which point the two were separated. After a break of several minutes, however, Lyon unexpectedly pursued Griswold again with the tongs, and the brawl was re-ignited.

The two men had a prior history of conflict. On 30 January of that year, Griswold had publicly insulted Lyon by calling him a coward, and Lyon had retaliated by spitting in Griswold's face. As a result of Lyon's actions in that case, he became the first Congressman to have charges filed against him with that body's ethics committee, although he escaped censure through a vote in the House.

=== 4 December 1837 ===
John Wilson, the speaker of the Arkansas House of Representatives and president of the Real Estate Bank of Arkansas, stabbed Representative Joseph J. Anthony to death during a legislative dispute on the floor of the chamber. Anthony had suggested that the president of the state bank (Wilson himself) administer bounties for the killing of wolves, a responsibility comically beneath an official of Wilson's stature. Incensed, he drew a bowie knife and attacked Anthony, who was unable to defend himself despite drawing a knife of his own. Although Wilson was expelled from his office, he was later acquitted of murder.

=== 22 May 1856 ===
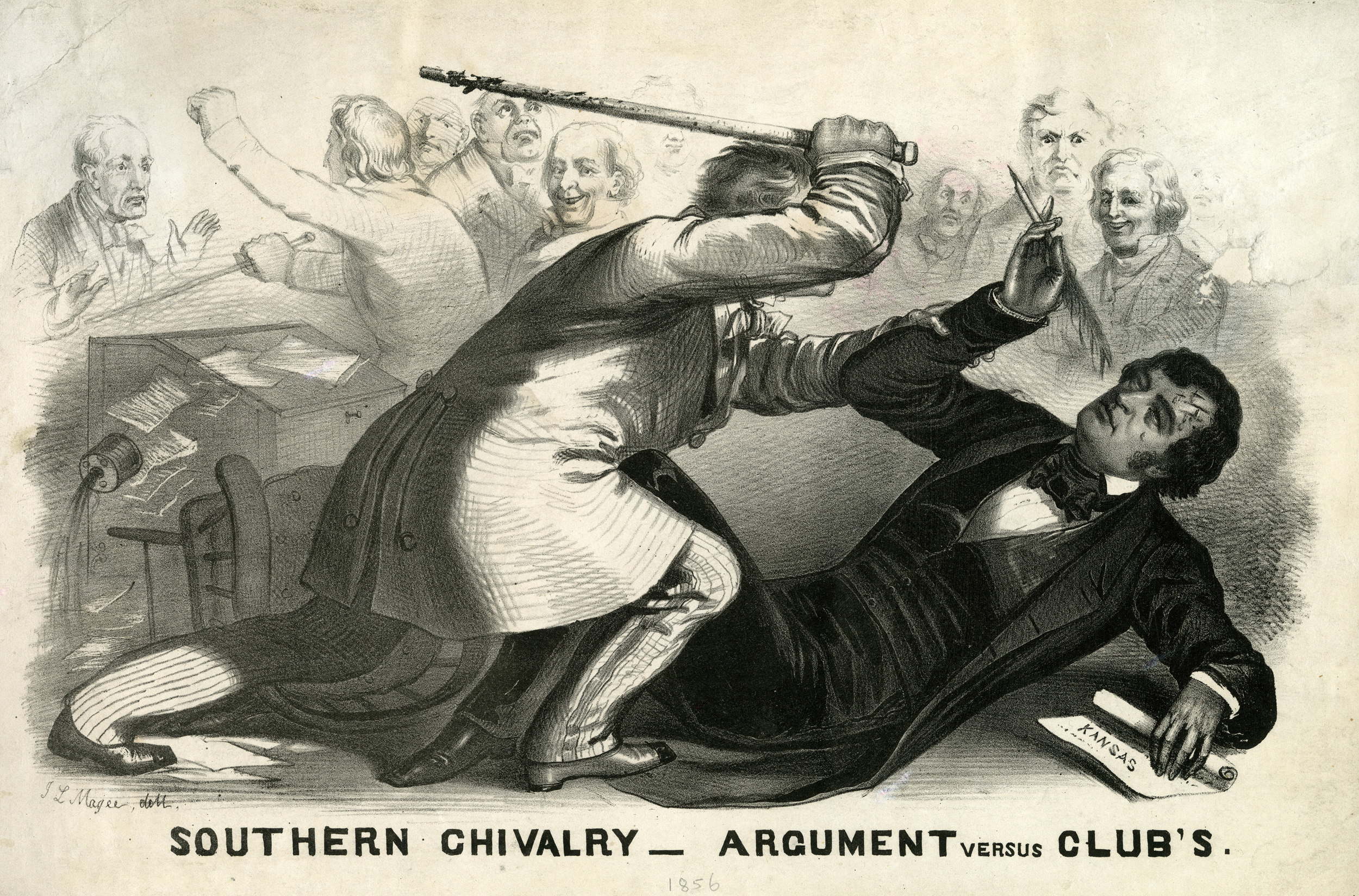
A political cartoon depicting U.S. Democratic congressman Preston Brooks's attack on Republican congressman Charles Sumner, an example of legislative violence.

Congressman Preston Brooks of South Carolina famously assaulted Charles Sumner of Massachusetts for a speech of his, saying Brooks' cousin, Senator Andrew Butler of South Carolina, took "a mistress who, though ugly to others, is always lovely to him; though polluted in the sight of the world, is chaste in his sight—I mean, the harlot, Slavery." According to Hoffer (2010), "It is also important to note the sexual imagery that recurred throughout the oration, which was neither accidental nor without precedent. Abolitionists routinely accused slaveholders of maintaining slavery so that they could engage in forcible sexual relations with their slaves." Sumner's own adopted daughter Mary Mildred Williams was a white-appearing girl born into slavery who was the descendant of such a relationship before being freed with the help of Sumner.

Brooks was infuriated and intended to challenge Sumner to a duel. After having consulted with fellow South Carolina Congressman Laurence Keitt on the situation, Brooks and Keitt decided that Sumner had the social status of a "drunkard" and was thus unworthy of the traditional challenge to a duel. Brooks (accompanied by Keitt) approached and confronted Sumner as he sat writing at his desk in the almost empty Senate chamber. As Sumner began to stand up, Brooks began beating Sumner severely on the head with a thick gutta-percha cane with a gold head before he could reach his feet. Sumner was knocked down and trapped under the heavy desk (bolted to the floor), but Brooks continued to bash Sumner until he ripped the desk from the floor. By this time, Sumner was blinded by his blood, and he staggered up the aisle and collapsed, lapsing into unconsciousness. Brooks continued to beat the motionless Sumner until he broke his cane, then quietly left the chamber. Several other senators attempted to help Sumner but were blocked by Keitt, who had jumped into the aisle, brandishing a pistol and shouting, "Let them be!" Keitt was censured for his actions and resigned in protest but was overwhelmingly re-elected to his seat by his South Carolina constituency within a month. For several decades following, Senators often carried walking canes and even revolvers in the Senate Chamber, fearing a similar assault.

=== 5 February 1858 ===
Congressman Laurence M. Keitt of South Carolina was involved in another incident of legislative violence less than two years later, starting a massive brawl on the House floor during a tense late-night debate. Keitt became offended when Pennsylvania Congressman (and later Speaker of the House) Galusha A. Grow stepped over to the Democratic side of the House chamber while delivering an anti-slavery speech. Keitt dismissively interrupted Grow's speech to demand he sit down, calling him a "black Republican puppy". Grow indignantly responded by telling Keitt that "No negro-driver shall crack his whip over me". Keitt became enraged and went for Grow's throat, shouting that he would "choke him for that". A large brawl involving approximately 50 representatives erupted on the House floor, ending only when a missed punch from Rep. Cadwallader Washburn of Wisconsin upended the hairpiece of Rep. William Barksdale of Mississippi. The embarrassed Barksdale accidentally replaced the wig backward, causing both sides to laugh spontaneously. Keitt would later die of wounds following the Battle of Cold Harbor while fighting for the Confederacy.

=== 5 April 1860 ===
During an anti-slavery speech by Illinois Republican Owen Lovejoy on the floor of the U.S. House of Representatives on 5 April 1860, Lovejoy condemned the Democratic Party for its racist views and steadfast support of slavery. As Lovejoy gave his speech condemning the evils of slavery, several of the Democrats present in the audience, such as Roger Atkinson Pryor, grew irate and incensed over Lovejoy's anti-slavery remarks and threatened him with physical harm, brandishing pistols and canes, with several Republicans rushing to Lovejoy's defense.

=== 24 February 1887 ===
The Indiana General Assembly experienced a massive brawl between Democrats and Republicans in the Indiana Senate and Indiana House of Representatives. The event began as an attempt by Democratic Governor Isaac P. Gray to be elected to the United States Senate and his own party's attempt to thwart him. Gray was a former Republican elected Governor by popular vote but was scorned as a turncoat by his new party, who maneuvered desperately (and unsuccessfully) to try to prevent his eligibility for the Senate seat. When Gray went over the head of the Democrats in arranging a midterm election for a new Lieutenant Governor, Republican Robert S. Robertson was elected with a majority of the popular vote, a situation the Democrats refused to accept despite a ruling from the Indiana Supreme Court. The matter came to a head when Robertson attempted to enter the Senate chamber to be sworn in and take his seat presiding over the session; he was attacked, beaten, and thrown bodily from the chamber by the Democrats, who then locked the chamber door, beginning four hours of intermittent mass brawling that spread throughout the Indiana Statehouse. The fight ended only after Republicans and Democrats started brandishing pistols and threatening to kill each other. The Governor deployed the Indianapolis Police Department to restore order. Subsequently, the Republican-controlled House of Representatives refused to communicate with the Democratic Senate, ending the legislative session and leading to calls for United States Senators to be elected by popular vote.

=== 20 February 1902 ===
During a debate on a bill dealing with the Philippine Islands, Senator Benjamin Tillman of South Carolina accused Senator John L. McLaurin of South Carolina of "treachery" for siding with the Republicans in support of Philippine annexation, and alleged that McLaurin had been granted control of government patronage in South Carolina. Upon receiving word of this statement, McLaurin entered the Senate Chamber and denounced Tillman, upon which Tillman attacked him. During the fight, other senators were hit by the punches. As a result, the Senate went into a closed session to debate the matter. Both senators apologized to the Senate but almost came to blows immediately thereafter. On 28 February, the Senate voted 54 to 12, with 22 abstentions, to censure both Tillman and McLaurin. McLaurin did not seek re-election, while Tillman served in the Senate until 1918.

=== 4 March 1985 ===
On the House of Representatives chamber floor, Democrat Thomas Downey of New York confronted Robert Dornan, a California Republican, and Dornan grabbed Downey's tie in response. Downey approached Dornan in response to a speech Dornan had given two days earlier before the Conservative Political Action Conference, in which he called Downey a "draft-dodging wimp" because of Downey's repeated denouncement of US-backed anti-government Contras rebels in Nicaragua. During the Vietnam War, Downey received a medical deferment from the draft because of a perforated eardrum. Downey had also been active in protesting the war. The Dornan-Downey feud originated two years earlier when Downey spoke against Dornan's nomination for a position at the Arms Control and Disarmament Agency.

The Dornan speech was made on Saturday, 2 March. On Monday afternoon, 4 March, Downey confronted Dornan, attracting dozens of viewers. Dornan claims Downey grabbed him by the shoulder and turned him around, asking if he had called him a wimp. Dornan answered, "I did, and you are." The exchange became heated, and Dornan eventually accused Downey of losing him the job two years earlier. According to Downey, as he began to walk away, Dornan grabbed him by the tie and collar and threatened him with "bodily harm." Dornan claimed he was straightening Downey's tie knot, saying later, "I like all the members to look elegant on the floor, you know." According to himself and other witnesses, Dornan told Downey to "get out of my face." After, Downey went to the Speaker of the House Tip O'Neill to tell him what had happened.

After the incident, Downey released a statement through a spokesman that he would not speak to reporters "until Dornan apologizes." His spokesman also said Downey was considering filing a complaint with the House Sergeant at Arms. Several witnesses spoke about the incident. Democratic Congressman Mike Lowry said, "Dornan grabbed Downey roughly by the collar, and I mean aggressively. None of this straighten-the-tie baloney. And he told Downey, 'Don't let me catch you off the floor, where you are protected by the sergeant at arms.' I really think Downey restrained himself." Republican Representative Chris Smith of New Jersey, who witnessed the altercation, said, "I found it humorous that Downey had to run up to the Speaker when it was over to tell all. It was like a little classroom act . . . Very childish . . . I think he's made much to-do about nothing."

The day after the incident, House Speaker Tip O'Neill condemned the behavior and said he told Dornan, "You can settle it on the street, but don't settle it on the House floor." He also told reporters that "discipline" would ensue if "anything like that" happened again. That day, Downey stated again, "Congressman Dornan owes me and the House of Representatives an apology." Dornan responded, "Apologize for what? For calling him a wimp? I am willing to concede that perhaps he just walks, talks, and acts like a little arrogant wimp. But maybe it's disinformation. Maybe he really wears a black leather jacket by night that I don't know about."

=== 7 June 2007 ===
During the final day of the 2007 regular session of the Alabama State Senate Republican Sen. Charles Bishop of Jasper punched Democratic Sen. Lowell Barron of Fyffe in the head after the latter allegedly called the former a "son of a bitch". Bystanders in the room then pulled the two apart.

=== 15 June 2011 ===
During a vote of California budget, state Democrat Assemblymen Warren Furutani and Republican Don Wagner broke out in a fight over a comment Wagner made that Furutani deemed offensive.

=== 15 December 2015 ===
A bloody backroom brawl took place between the mayor and a council member at a city council meeting in Birmingham, Alabama.

=== 29 May 2017 ===
During a contentious 2017 Texas House of Representatives session, a minor altercation was observed after Republican State Representative Matt Rinaldi was pushed and received personal death threats. The incident occurred after Rinaldi called U.S Immigration and Customs Enforcement when a large crowd of protesters, in opposition to the sanctuary cities ban, disrupted the legislative proceedings. Representative Poncho Nevárez, Democratic Party member, admitted to laying hands on Rinaldi amid the fierce debates, but no arrests were made by Texas DPS.

=== 6 January 2023 ===
In the midst of the lengthy 2023 House Speaker election, Representative Mike Rogers was restrained by Representative Richard Hudson when Rogers attempted to lunge at Representative Matt Gaetz. Gaetz, alongside other members of the Freedom Caucus, had blocked Kevin McCarthy's speakership bid for four days by nominating and voting for other representatives, which caused much tension in the House. This, in combination with Gaetz's attempt to obtain a subcommittee chairmanship in the House Armed Services Committee (which Rogers was chairman-elect of), precipitated the incident.

== Venezuela ==
=== 24 January 1848 ===
After almost two decades of continuous clashes, a brawl broke out at the headquarters of the Congress in Caracas between Conservatives and Liberals, leading to four deaths.

=== 10 February 2011 ===
Deputy Alfonso Marquina protested the presence of a boisterous group of Chavistas in the audience.

=== 30 April 2013 ===
During a session of the National Assembly pro-government and opposition deputies got into a fight. The origin of the discussion had to do with the rejection by National Assembly president Diosdado Cabello to give members of the opposition a right to speak.

=== 5 July 2017 ===
Colectivos attacking Venezuelan lawmakers

Colectivos and supporters of President Nicolás Maduro stormed the Palacio Federal Legislativo on Independence Day, assaulting many members of the opposition-led National Assembly. At least 12 opposition legislators and their staff were injured as a result of the attack.

== Yugoslavia ==
On June 20, 1928, Puniša Račić, a Montenegrin Serb leader of the People's Radical Party (NRS), shot and killed Croatian Peasant Party (HSS) representatives Pavle Radić and Đuro Basariček and HSS leader Stjepan Radić, who died of his injuries two months later, during a highly charged session aggravated by ethnic tensions on the floor of parliament. He was tried and handed a 60-year sentence, immediately reduced to twenty years. He served most of his sentence under house arrest and was killed by Yugoslav Partisans in October 1944.

== See also ==
- List of attacks on legislatures
- Political violence
- Workplace violence
