= Old State House (Little Rock, Arkansas) =

Historic property and museum in Arkansas, US

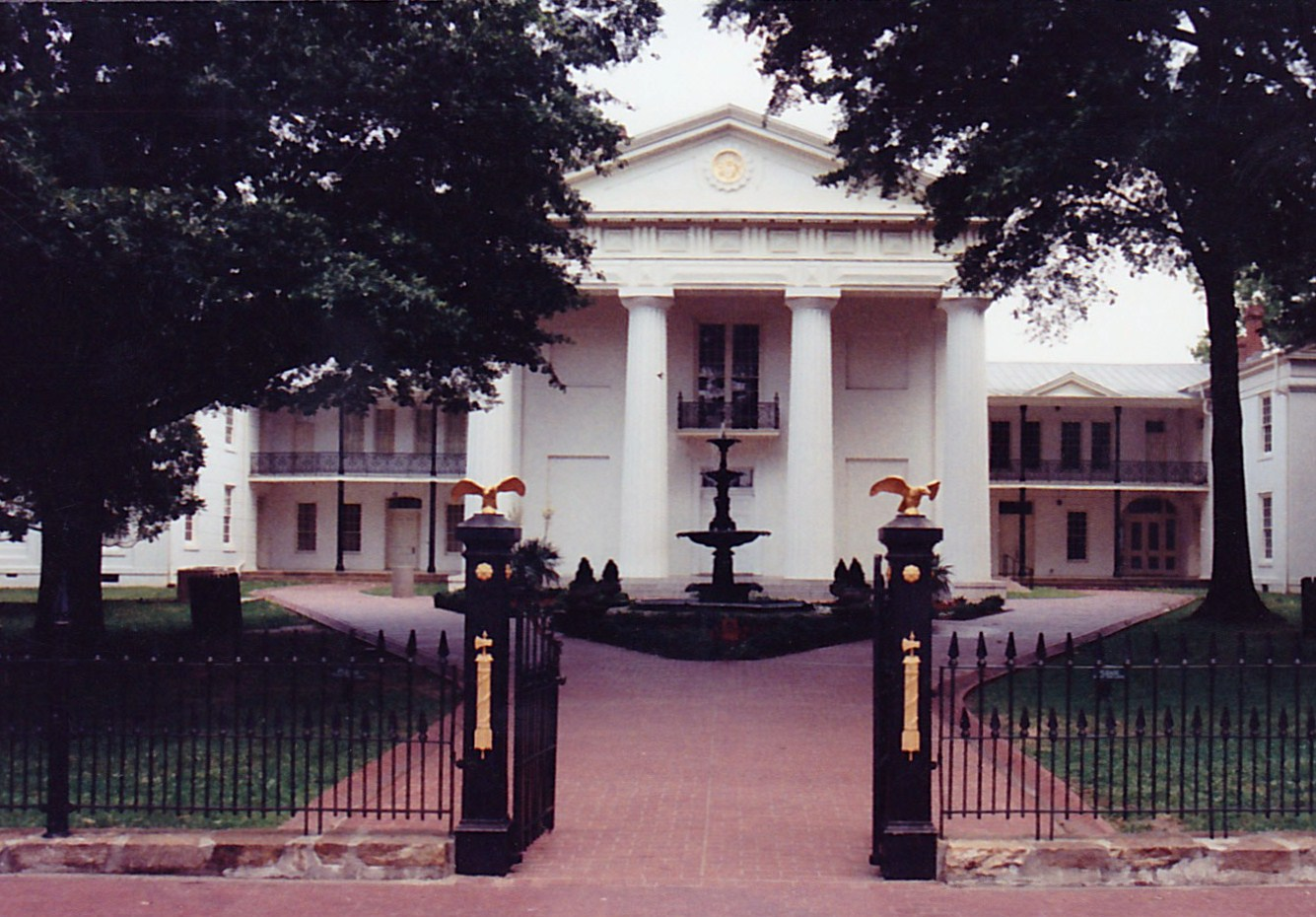
- South façade of the Old State House
- Interactive map of the Old State House area
- Former names: Arkansas State House
- Alternative names: Old State House Museum

General information
- Status: Used as a museum
- Architectural style: Greek Revival
- Location: 300 W. Markham St., Little Rock, Arkansas, United States
- Coordinates: 34°44′56.3″N 92°16′21.5″W
- Current tenants: Old State House Museum
- Construction started: 1833
- Completed: 1842
- Client: State of Arkansas
- Owner: State of Arkansas

Design and construction
- Architects: Gideon Shryock; George Weigart

Website
- oldstatehouse.com
- Old State House
- U.S. National Register of Historic Places
- U.S. National Historic Landmark
- NRHP reference No.: 69000037

Significant dates
- Added to NRHP: December 3, 1969
- Designated NHL: December 9, 1997

The Old State House, formerly called the Arkansas State House, is the oldest surviving state capitol building west of the Mississippi River. It was the capitol building of Arkansas from 1842 to 1912, when the new Arkansas State Capitol was completed.

It was the site of the secession convention, as well as the fourth constitutional convention when delegates agreed to ensure voting rights for freedmen and establish public education.

== History ==
=== Construction ===
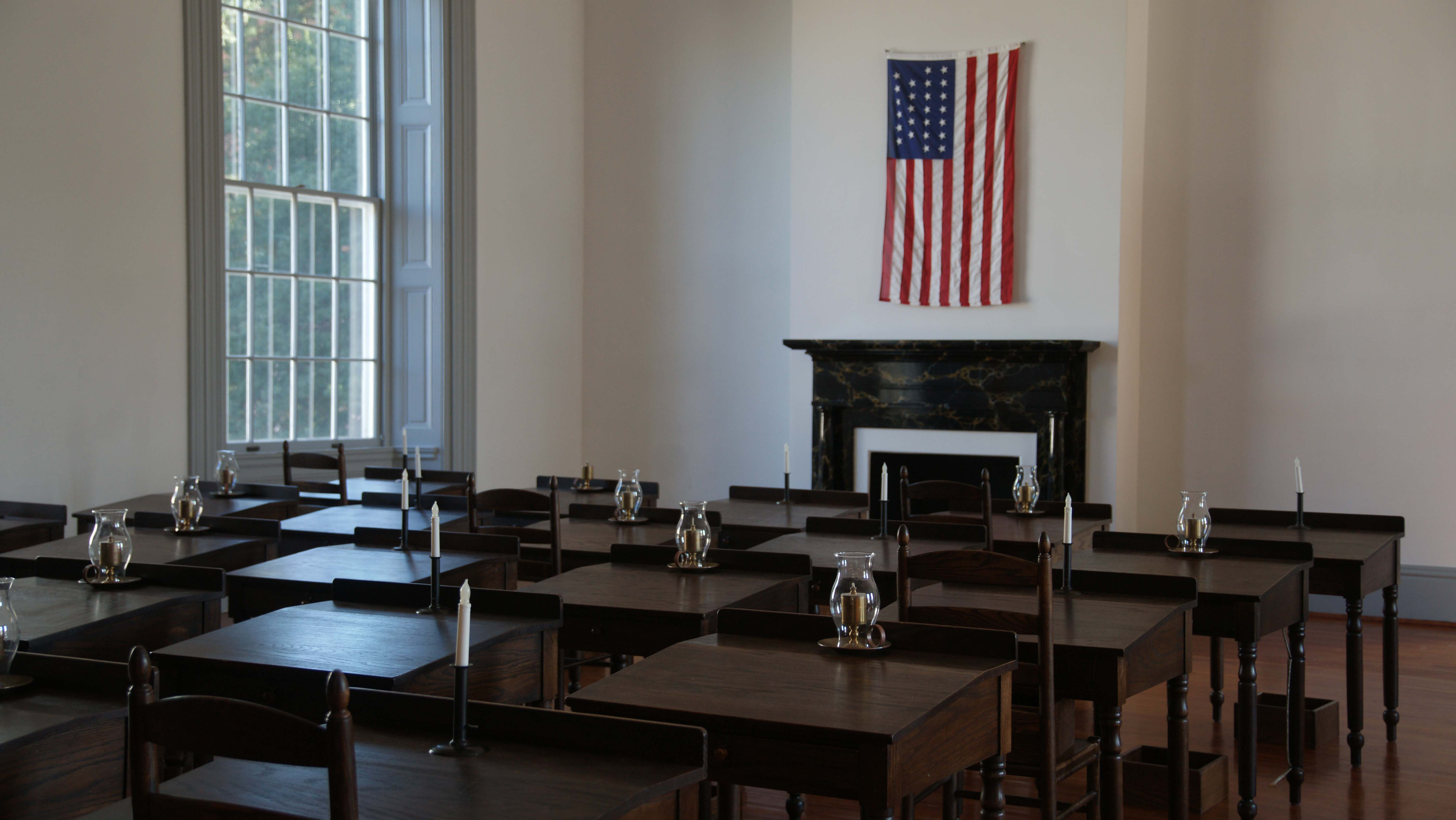
House of Representatives Chamber

Commissioned by Governor John Pope, the State House was constructed between 1833 and 1842. Architect Gideon Shryock, who previously designed the Kentucky State Capitol in Frankfort, chose a Greek Revival style for the building. The original design was too expensive for the territory, so Shryock's assistant George Weigart changed the plans and oversaw construction. The Arkansas General Assembly moved into the building while construction was ongoing. On December 4, 1837, in the first session of the General Assembly, Speaker John Wilson killed Representative Joseph J. Anthony in a knife fight on the floor of the state House of Representatives.

=== American Civil War ===
Unionists prevailed at an initial, March 1861, secession convention after the 1860 election of Abraham Lincoln. However, after South Carolina fired on Fort Sumter and Lincoln called up troops, on the morning of May 6, 1861, a second secession convention assembled at the State House. After intense debate, an ordinance of secession passed with five opposing votes. Four opposing delegates relented after unanimity was urged. Isaac Murphy, a delegate from Madison County, held out despite enormous pressure. After the Union victory at the Battle of Bayou Fourche in September 1863, Federal troops occupied the building for the rest of the war.

=== Reconstruction Era ===
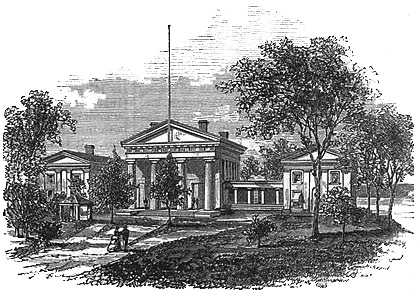
Drawing of the State House in the 1870s, during the William R. Miller administration

After the American Civil War ended, the State House was the site of another constitutional convention to determine whether Arkansas would accept the Fourteenth Amendment to the U.S. Constitution, permit suffrage for black males over 21, and create public schools for both black and white children. After contentious debate, the proposals were approved in a new constitution that emerged in February 1868, and was ratified in March. Also during Reconstruction, the State House was an object of contention in the so-called Brooks–Baxter War, and was fortified during that struggle. The cannon "Lady Baxter" still remains on the State House grounds. As part of the Arkansas exhibit for the 1876 Philadelphia Centennial Exposition, a three-tiered fountain sat in front of the States exhibit building. The following year in 1877 the fountain was placed on the state house grounds. A recast of the original fountain now sits in its place. In 1885, an iron statue of the Three Graces, representing Law, Justice and Mercy, was placed atop of the State House, however it was removed in 1928.

=== Changing use ===
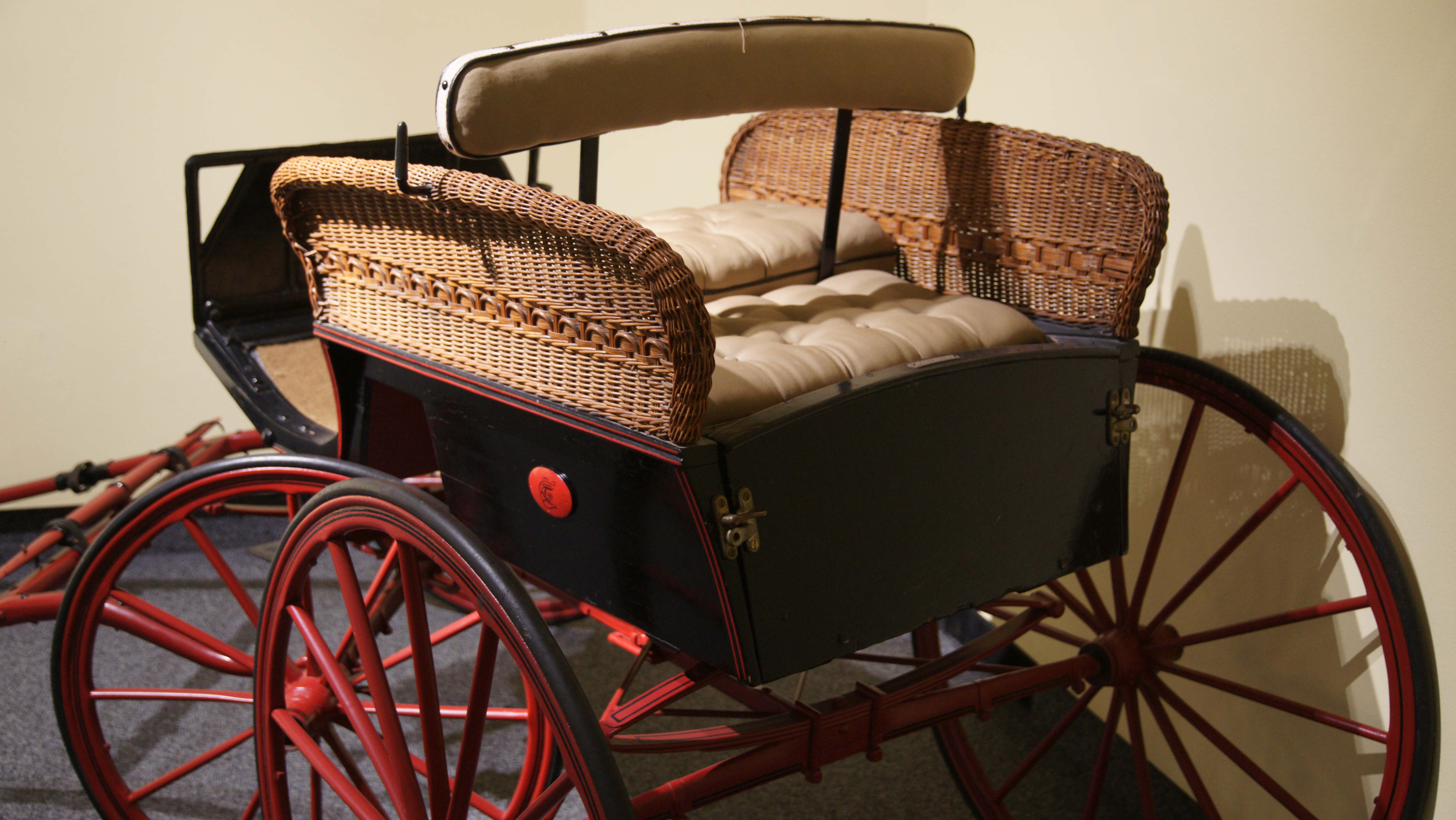
Childs play carriage artifact

The building served as a state capitol until the new capitol building was constructed in 1912. For a time it was used as a medical school. Afterwards, it served as an Arkansas war memorial and was used as an office building for federal and state agencies, as well as a meeting place for patriotic organizations. In 1947 the General Assembly approved acts designating the State House as a museum. The front entrance was the site of President Bill Clinton's presidential campaign announcement on October 3, 1991, and the site of his election night celebrations in both of his campaigns for the presidency on November 3, 1992, and November 5, 1996, respectively. The building underwent major renovation in 1996, and it was designated a National Historic Landmark in 1997. The building continues to serve as a museum with exhibits related to Arkansas history and culture. Permanent collections include battle flags, the inaugural gowns of the First Ladies of Arkansas, art pottery, and African-American quilts. Special exhibits are staged periodically as well.

== Interior ==
=== Floor plans ===
Floor plans of the Old State House

Foundation

First Floor

Second Floor

Layout and room names as of 1933

== See also ==
- David O. Dodd Memorial
- List of National Historic Landmarks in Arkansas
- List of the oldest buildings in Arkansas
- National Register of Historic Places listings in Little Rock, Arkansas
