= August 2016 Gaziantep bombing =

Terror attack of a Kurdish wedding by ISIL in Turkey

- Part of Turkey–ISIL conflict
- Location: 37.039528°N 37.392846°E; Şahinbey, Gaziantep, Turkey
- Date: 20 August 2016; 22:50 EEST (UTC+03)
- Target: Wedding ceremony
- Attack type: Suicide bombing, Mass murder
- Deaths: 57
- Injuries: 66 (14 critically)
- Perpetrator: Islamic State
- Assailant: Suicide bomber

On 20 August 2016, a suicide bomber targeted a Kurdish wedding in Gaziantep, Turkey. 57 people were killed and 66 injured in the attack, 14 critically.

== Attack ==
On 20 August 2016, a suicide bomber targeted a wedding party in Gaziantep, Turkey, at 10:50pm local time. More than 200 people were present at the party. The attack targeted a Kurdish family who had fled the Kurdish town of Siirt due to Turkish-PKK violence, and occurred during the traditional henna night party according to witnesses. The groom was injured in the attack, but the bride escaped unharmed. The groom's injuries were described as non-life-threatening. A witness reported that two suspicious individuals had approached the party and left the scene following the attack. The security forces have been looking for these two suspects. The Kurdish Peoples Democratic Party (HDP) announced that the attack had been carried out against a wedding of their party members. Mahmut Toğrul, an MP of the HDP for Gaziantep, deemed the attack was a retaliation for the losses the Islamic State (IS) had to endure in Syria against the People's Defense Units (YPG). Footage from the scene of the attack was banned by Turkey's broadcast regulator RTUK. The attack came hours after Turkish Prime Minister Binali Yıldırım said that Turkey could play an active role in the Syrian civil war.

A total of 57 people were killed while 66 people were injured in the attack. A high proportion of the fatalities were children, with 34 of the dead being under 18. Thirteen of those killed were women. Among those injured, 66 were reported as remaining in hospital as of 22 August, and the condition of 14 was reported as serious.

== Perpetrator ==
The IS and Kurdistan Workers' Party (PKK) were earlier blamed for the attack by AKP parliamentary officials, though no group has yet claimed responsibility. Turkish President Recep Tayyip Erdoğan said the attacker was believed to be between 12 and 14 years old. He also stated that the attack had probably been carried out by IS.

The Prime Minister, Binali Yıldırım, stated a day later that Turkish authorities were still trying to determine who carried out the attack, and whether the bomber was a child or an adult. As of 22 August 2016, DNA tests were underway to ascertain the identity of the perpetrator.

== Reactions ==
- Azerbaijan: President Ilham Aliyev sent a letter of condolence to the Turkish President.
- Egypt: Foreign Ministry spokesman Ahmed Abu Zeid stressed that "the Egyptian people stand by the Turkish people in these critical moments".
- France: French President François Hollande condemned the attack and offered condolences to authorities and people of Turkey. Foreign minister, Jean-Marc Ayrault, tweeted, France is beside Turkey after this cowardly attack.
- Greece: Foreign Ministry condemned the attack on its Twitter account.
- Iran: Foreign Ministry spokesperson, Bahram Qasemi has strongly condemned a bomb blast targeting a wedding ceremony in Turkey's southeastern province of Gaziantep. "Carrying out such terrorist acts in a wedding ceremony and the killing of defenseless people and civilians once again clearly displayed the ominous and anti-human goals of Takfiri terrorism," Qasemi said.
- Pakistan: Pakistani Foreign Ministry strongly condemning the attack released a statement. "Pakistan condemns this despicable act of terrorism in the strongest possible terms. We extend our profound sympathies and condolences to the brotherly people and Government of Turkey. Our thoughts and prayers are with all those who have lost their loved ones. We also pray for the speediest recovery of the wounded".
- Palestine: President Mahmoud Abbas decried the attack and offered condolences to his Turkish counterpart, Turkish people and families of the victims.
- Qatar: Qatar's Foreign Ministry condemned the attack and expressed Qatar's support for Turkey's effort to maintain stability and security in the region.
- Russia: President Vladimir Putin called President Recep Tayyip Erdoğan to offer condolences following the attack.
- Saudi Arabia: The Ministry of Foreign Affairs strongly denounced the attack, and backed Turkey's measures against terrorism.
- Sweden: Sweden's Foreign Minister Margot Wallström "vehemently condemned" the attack.
- (Northern Cyprus) Turkish Republic of North Cyprus: President Mustafa Akıncı condemned the attack and expressed his country's support and solidarity.
- United Arab Emirates: Ministry of Foreign Affairs and International Cooperation condemned the attack and denounced all forms of terrorism.
- United States: The US embassy in Ankara condemned the attack.
- United Kingdom: On his Twitter account, British Ambassador to Turkey Richard Moore condemned this attack along with previous PKK attacks.
