= Land reform in Ukraine =

This article discusses land reform in Ukraine. (Note: Ukrainian: Земельна реформа в Україні, romanized: Zemeljna reforma v Ukrajini.)

== Land reform in the 1990s ==
The history of land reform in modern Ukraine begins with the announcement of the authorities’ plans to carry out land reform, which were approved by a resolution of the Supreme Soviet of the Ukrainian SSR (predecessor of the current Verkhovna Rada) dated 18 December 1990. The Resolution emphasised that land reform was an integral part of the economic reform being implemented in Ukraine in connection with the economy’s transition to a market-based system. On the same day, the 1990 Land Code of Ukraine was also adopted.

Before the dissolution of the Soviet Union in December 1991, Ukrainian farmers worked on collective farms and a free market had only existed for around a year.

After the Declaration of Independence of Ukraine (24 August 1991), the Ukrainian government inherited the assets of the Soviet state, including the sovhosps (Russian: sovkhozes) and kolhosps (Russian: kolkhozes). The Verkhovna Rada approved the new 1992 Land Code of Ukraine in March 1992, which provided the legal framework for breaking them down into newly formed Collective Agricultural Enterprises. Between 1995 and 1999, the land was distributed, and more than 6 million Ukrainians received plots of arable land, getting between two and three hectares each.

== Land reform 2000–2002 ==
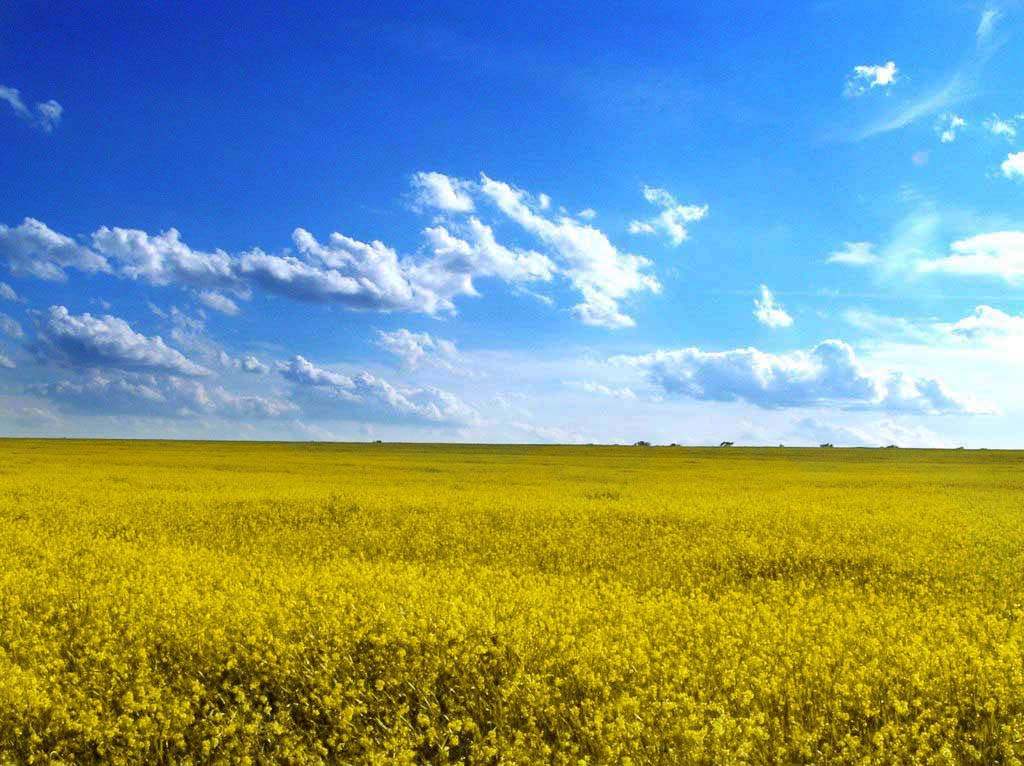
Farmlands in Odesa Oblast (2006)

To prevent speculators and mafia-like businessmen (oligarchs) from snapping up the land at a bargain price – as had happened with heavy industry – a moratorium was adopted (2001, as part of the 2001 Land Code of Ukraine) and imposed (2002): a ban on sales of former kolhosp farmlands. As a result, agricultural lands ended up divided among 7 million Ukrainians, resulting in highly fragmented ownership. The law also prevented the farmers from using farmland as collateral for bank loans. The 2001 law has also prevented the government from selling millions of additional hectares. Only five other countries in the world, among them China and North Korea, had maintained similar restrictions on the sale of private agricultural land.

== 2003–2013 period ==
In Ukraine a debate around the land reform has lasted for more than 20 years and it is still not over.

— Olena Bogdan, 2011

Since at least 2011, farmland was remaining as the only major asset in Ukraine that was not privatised.

An October 2013 report by the Cabinet of Ministers of Ukraine identified the following problems in the agricultural sector, that were to be addressed in the 2013–2020 period:

- uneven development of various forms of economic activity, accompanied by a weakening of the position of medium-sized agricultural producers as a result of the creation of formally identical but unequal economic conditions for agricultural producers of different sizes and social burdens;
- lack of motivation for cooperation and consolidation of small agricultural producers within rural communities, weakening of the economic basis for the development of rural communities;
- instability of the competitive position of domestic agricultural products on foreign markets due to the incomplete process of adaptation to European requirements for quality and food safety;
- slow pace of technical and technological modernisation of production;
- risks of increased production costs due to the growing wear and tear of equipment, the prevalence of outdated technologies, and the increasing cost of non-renewable natural resources in the production cost structure of domestic agricultural products;
- losses of such products due to imperfections in the logistics system for their storage and the infrastructure of the agricultural market as a whole;
- lack of motivation among agricultural producers to comply with agro-ecological requirements;
- limited capacity of the domestic market for agricultural products, due to low purchasing power of the population;

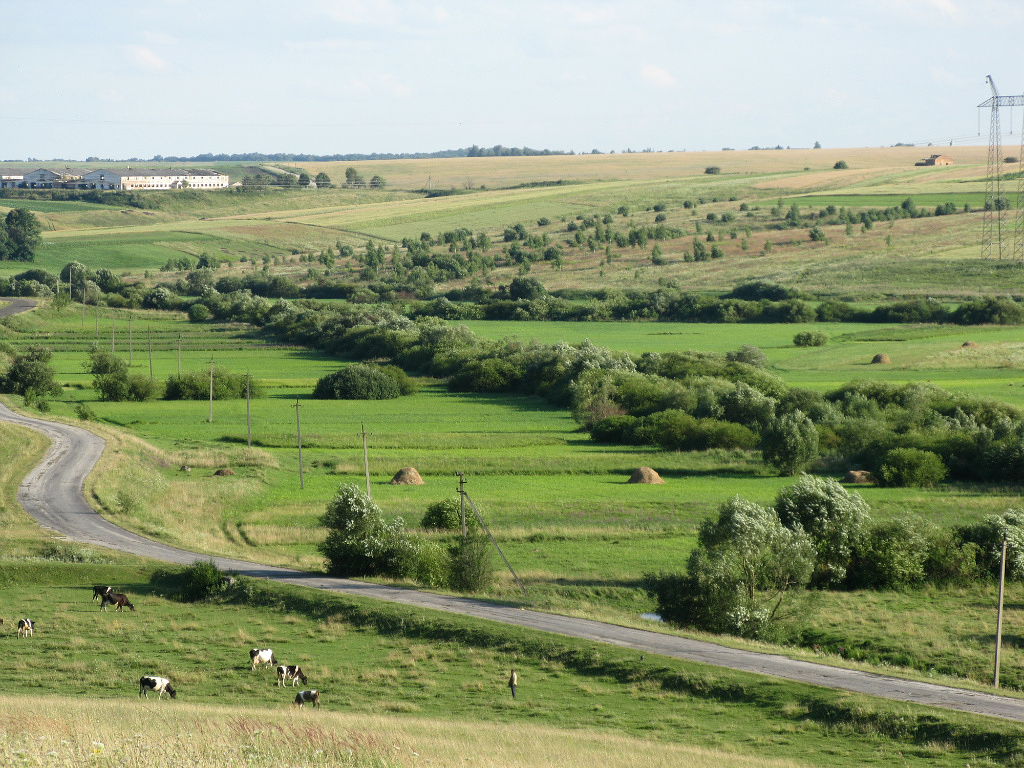
Flood-meadows with grazing cattle and haystacks in Kutyshche, Lviv Oblast (2018)

- insufficient effectiveness of self-organisation and self-regulation of the agricultural products market, difficulty for agricultural producers in developing a consolidated position on the protection of their interests;
- lack of information among a significant proportion of agricultural producers about market conditions and the conditions for doing business in the sector;
- incompleteness of land reform in Ukraine.

== Land reform 2014–2019 ==
A 2026 paper in Land Use Policy concluded that the 2014 Ukrainian land decentralisation reform had been successful, as local agrarian communities were able to achieve better auction outcomes for renting out public farmland than the central government's State Service of Ukraine for Geodesy, Cartography, and Cadastre, increasing their revenues and improving their financial situation.

The European Court for Human Rights ruled in the May 2018 judgement of Zelenchuk and Tsytsyura v. Ukraine that the 2001 ban on selling farmland violated the Ukrainian Constitution by preventing owners from fully exercising their property rights. The Groysman Government pledged in July 2017 to lift the ban on sales of farmland. According to a 2020 estimate of the World Bank a land-reform programme could bring an increase up to 1.5% in GDP. The party Batkivshchyna opposed, and pledged in 2018 to initiate a nationwide referendum to stop the lifting of the ban on sales of farmland.

In July 2019, President Volodymyr Zelenskyy has initiated the reforms of the land laws to pass to lift the ban. A brawl broke out in the Verkhovna Rada (Ukraine's parliament) on 6 February 2020 over the bill. The Verkhovna Rada terminated the Honcharuk Government on 5 March 2020 and pledged the passage of legislation sought by the International Monetary Fund to lift the ban on sales of agricultural land. The Honcharuk Government had appeared to be too weak to pass the necessary reforms through the Verkhovna Rada during several weeks of protest by agriculturalists, even in spite of Zelenskyy's personal appearances. By March 2020, the IMF remained concerned about the pace of land reforms. Ukraine in 2020 needed to repay $17 billion of foreign loans and the International Monetary Fund pressured the government to enact laws which would hasten land reform in exchange for a $5.5 billion loan-package.

== Land reform in the 2020s ==
On 31 March 2020, the Verkhovna Rada adopted a law introducing amendments on the sale of agricultural land. Per the law, the moratorium on the sale of agricultural land was lifted on 1 July 2021. From July 2021 until 1 January 2024, temporarily no more than 100 hectares were allowed to be owned per person and no companies were able to buy land. The land market was fully opened for the first time since independence on 1 July 2021. In 2020, partly under pressure from the IMF, which would only provide funding if agriculture was reformed, it became possible again to sell agricultural land, albeit temporarily (until 1 January 2024) and subject to conditions such as a maximum size of 100 hectares. However, the 2020 reform is controversial. Meanwhile, the production of grains and oilseeds has increasingly come under the control of large agricultural companies established after 2000. The transition to a more market-oriented environment seems to have been relatively successful, but many smaller companies have disappeared or are projected to disappear. Existing smaller companies often face financial problems, which are frequently resolved by attracting an investor with market knowledge and capital. The general effect has been that farmers lost control over their businesses.

As of 2023 the average price per hectare was 40000 hryvnias (apprixamately 1060 USD).

According to some researchers, by 2024 approximately 28% of agricultural land was managed by foreign investors such as NCH Capital, Vanguard Group, Kopernik Global Investors, BNP Asset Management Holding, NN Investment Partners Holdings (subsidiary of Goldman Sachs), and Norges Bank Investment Management.

== See also ==
- Accession of Ukraine to the European Union
- Agriculture in Ukraine
- Land reforms by country
- Privatisation in Ukraine

== Bibliography ==
- Neyter, Roman; Gardebroek, Cornelis; Ihle, Rico; Nivievskyi, Oleg (February 2026). "Effects of the 2014 Ukrainian land decentralization reform on land rental auction performance". Land Use Policy. 161 107852. Elsevier: 13. Bibcode:2026LUPol.16107852N. doi:10.1016/j.landusepol.2025.107852.
