= Holford Bonds =

Series of real estate bonds in Arkansas, US

The Holford Bonds were a series of real estate bonds that have their roots in the founding of the state and created political turmoil in Arkansas as late as 1906.

== History ==
Arkansas joined the union in 1836 right on the eve of the panic of 1837. The original Arkansas State Constitution called for the creation of two banks. The State Bank of Arkansas, meant to loan money to individuals, and the Real Estate Bank of Arkansas, which was a land grant bank typical of those seen in other states such as Florida and Mississippi at the time. The two banks were chartered during the first legislative session and opened for business in 1838, but by 1840 the State bank had failed. Its bonds were then issued to the Real Estate bank.

The Real Estate bank was unable to sell the bonds but was able to use them as collateral for $121,000 loan with the North American Banking and Trust Company of New York. The legality of this was questionable because they were being used below their face value, which was against the original bonds condition. Without waiting for the state to redeem the loan, and in a breach of good faith the bonds were sold to James Holford, a banker in London, England, for $325,000. Then after they were known as "The Holford Bonds". The New York trust company would soon fail having stolen over $200,000 from the state of Arkansas through this deal. Holford then sought to make back the money by suing the state of Arkansas for $250,000, filing in both Arkansas and New York.

Then the Real Estate bank failed and the ownership of the bonds was transferred to the state. The question then became whether or not the state was legally obligated to refund these bonds at face value or even at all since they were now surrounded by legally questionable deals and bad faith. The ordeal turned the state against banking, and an amendment was added to the constitution in 1846 prohibiting the state from chartering another bank.

In the reconstruction era, the issue of refunding the bonds along with the infrastructure bills was the centerpiece of Republican policy. The bonds were tied up in a lot of real estate in the state and the carpetbagger government was looking for ways to fund infrastructure projects, many of which turned out to be phony ways to funnel money into their own pockets. The Arkansas legislature passed laws to refund the bonds on April 6, 1869 with 30 years interest. Afterward they were contested on the grounds of there being fraud and breach of faith in their sale by the trust company. Governor Baxter's veto of a refunding bill that included the Holford bonds would tip off the Brooks-Baxter War in 1874. It wasn't until 1884 that the Fishback Amendment, named for its author William M. Fishback of Fort Smith, Arkansas, was passed prohibiting their payment, and added to the Constitution of Arkansas.
