= Mahmut Toğrul =

Politician from Turkey

Mahmut Toğrul MP
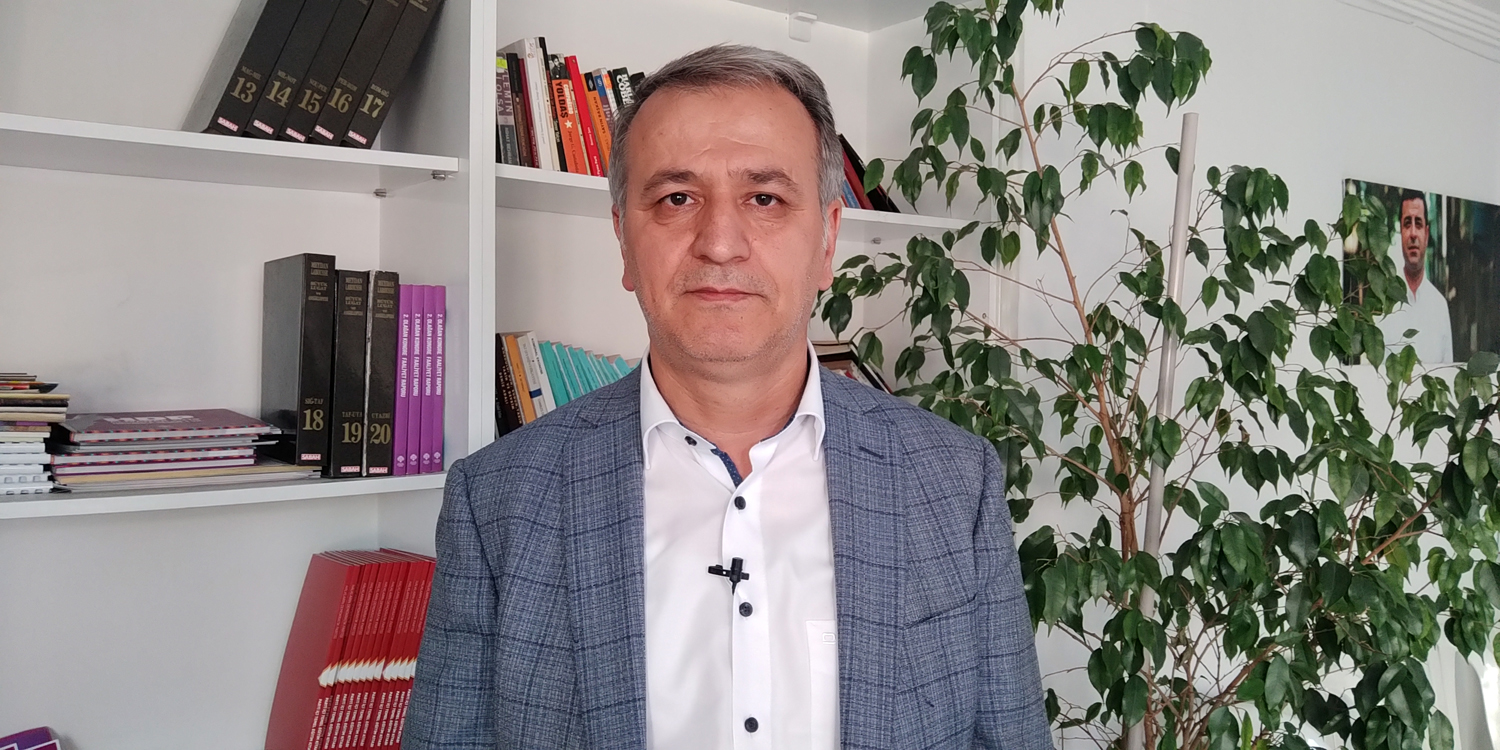

Member of the Grand National Assembly
- In office 2015–2023
- Constituency: Gaziantep (June 2015, Nov 2015, 2018)

Personal details
- Born: 1 January 1967 (age 59) Tilkiler, Pazarcık, Kahramanmaraş, Turkey
- Party: Peoples' Democratic Party

Mahmut Toğrul (born 1967, Pazarcık, Turkey) is a Turkish chemist and politician of the Peoples Democratic Party (HDP). He is a member of the Grand National Assembly of Turkey between 2015 and 2023, representing Gaziantep for the HDP. He is also one of the founders of the Mesopotamia Foundation, which envisions establishing a university where one could be taught in their native language.

== Early life and education ==
Mahmut Toğrul was born to a Kurdish Alevi family in the village Tilkiler, in the district of Pazarcık in the Kahramanmaraş province. He attended primary school in Tilkiler and high school Gaziantep. After his graduation from high school in 1985 he enrolled in the Dicle University where studied chemistry in the faculty of sciences and letters. During his studies at the Dicle University, he became an assistant in the department of chemistry. He graduated with a doctorate in organic chemistry in 2001. He then followed up on his studies at the University of Cambridge where he was a visiting scientist for the term from 2002 and 2003.

== Professional career ==
Mahmut Toğrul lectured at the Dicle University since 2005 and later became an associate professor. He was the representative of the Education and Science Workers' Union (Egitim Sen) of the Dicle University for fifteen years.

He is the general secretary of the Mesopotamia Foundation, which was established in 2013 with the aim to establish a university which provides education in the native language. In 2015 the foundation applied for the establishment for a Kurdistan University.

== Political career ==
Mahmut Toğrul lectured on quantum mechanics at the political academy of the Democratic Regions Party (BDP). In the parliamentary elections of November 2015 he was elected to the Grand National Assembly of Turkey representing Gaziantep for the HDP. He was re-elected in the parliamentary elections in June 2018.

== Political positions ==
=== Academics for Peace ===
In November 2012, Mahmut Toğrul joined dozens of academics to announce their support for the right to defend oneself in the native language, the end of the isolation of Abdullah Öcalan and a new start for the Kurdish-Turkish peace process. After several of the Academics for Peace were detained for signing the declaration "We are not a party to this crime" in which an end to the human rights violations committed in the Kurdish populated regions was demanded he demanded to be detained as well as he did the same crime. In the Grand National Assembly of Turkey, he submitted a bill in September 2019, which demanded the reinstating the dismissed Academics for Peace, as in July the same year the Constitutional Court ruled the Academics rights were violated by sentencing them for terrorist offenses.

=== Ethnic cleansing in Afrin ===
Mahmut Toğrul accused the Turkish military of carrying out an ethnic cleansing program in Afrin, northern Syria, in parliament following which a brawl between him and a fellow HDP lawmaker Müslim Doğan against MPs of the governing Justice and Development Party (AKP) ensued. Both HDP lawmakers were wounded and entered the clinic of the parliament. Togrul was diagnosed with a broken scapula.

== Prosecution ==
In November 2018, Mahmut Toğrul was sentenced to over 1 year and 6 months imprisonment over alleged terror propaganda he made during two speeches he held in 2016. He defended himself claiming that his remarks were within the bounds of freedom of expression.

== Personal life ==
Mahmut Toğrul is married and has one child.
