= John Wilson (Arkansas politician) =

American politician

Colonel John Wilson

Member of the Arkansas House of Representatives from the Pike County district
- In office November 2, 1840 – November 7, 1842
- Preceded by: A. Thompson
- Succeeded by: William Bizzell

Speaker of the Arkansas House of Representatives
- In office October 6, 1828 – October 3, 1831; October 7, 1833 – December 4, 1837
- Succeeded by: Grandison Royston

Member of the Arkansas House of Representatives from the Clark County district
- In office October 3, 1831 – December 4, 1837
- Succeeded by: A.H. Rutherford

Delegate to 1836 Arkansas Constitutional Convention
- In office January 4, 1836 – January 30, 1836
- Constituency: Clark County

Member of the Arkansas House of Representatives from the Hempstead County district
- In office October 6, 1823 – October 3, 1831

Personal details
- Died: 1865 Texas

Colonel John Wilson (died 1865) was an American politician. He served as the Speaker of the House of the Arkansas House of Representatives from 1836 to 1837. He killed fellow representative Joseph J. Anthony in 1837, being acquitted but expelled from the House. He was later reelected in 1840. Wilson died in Texas in 1865.

== Biography ==
John Wilson represented Clark County at the constitutional convention to create the first constitution of Arkansas in 1836. He was elected as the president of the convention. He later represented Clark County in the Arkansas House of Representatives, serving as the Speaker of the House. On December 4, 1837, Wilson entered into a knife fight with fellow representative Joseph J. Anthony after arguing with him about the Arkansas Real Estate Bank, of which Wilson was the president. Wilson stabbed Anthony, killing him. He was arrested for the crime, with the trial occurring in May 1838. He was also expelled from the House on December 5, with Grandison Royston being chosen as the new Speaker.

Before the trial began, Wilson's lawyer, Chester Ashley, was able to argue that he could not have a fair trial in Pulaski County. The trial was moved and became the first murder trial held in Saline County. It concluded with Wilson being found guilty of excusable homicide and released. He was later re-elected to the Arkansas House in 1840 after moving to Pike County. In 1842, during a debate on the Real Estate Bank, Wilson became angry with another representative, this time Whig representative Lorenzo Gibson. However, other House members intervened and stopped a fight from occurring. Later in life, Wilson moved to Texas. He ran for election to the Texas state legislature but was unsuccessful. He died there in 1865.

== See also ==
- Legislative violence
