= Privatisation in Ukraine =

Privatisation process in Ukraine

State Property Fund of Ukraine
- Фонд державного майна України

Agency overview
- Formed: 1991
- Jurisdiction: Government of Ukraine
- Headquarters: Kyiv, Ukraine
- Agency executive: Chairman / Director
- Parent department: Cabinet of Ministers of Ukraine
- Website: www.spfu.gov.ua

Privatisation in Ukraine under the State Property Fund of Ukraine (Ukrainian: Фонд державного майна України) is the process of transferring state-owned assets to private ownership, which began after the dissolution of the Soviet Union in 1991. This economic transformation aimed to shift Ukraine from a centrally planned economy to a market-oriented system, fostering private enterprise and attracting foreign investment.

Privatization process in Ukraine unfolded in multiple waves, shaped by a combination of political, economic, and legal developments. Initially, the government implemented mass privatization programs in the 1990s, distributing state assets through vouchers and auctions. While privatization facilitated the development of a private sector, it also contributed to the concentration of wealth and political influence among a small group of individuals, often referred to as oligarchs.

== History ==
=== Early privatization ===
Following Ukraine's independence in 1991, the government established the State Property Fund of Ukraine (SPFU) to oversee the transfer of state-owned assets to private ownership. The SPFU was tasked with implementing the country's privatization policy and managing the process of converting state property into private hands.

In 1992, the Verkhovna Rada adopted key legislation that laid the legal foundation for privatization. This included the Law on the Privatization of State Property and the Law on the Privatization of the State Housing Fund. These laws defined the categories of property subject to privatization, established procedures for asset valuation and sale, and introduced mechanisms for public participation in the process, such as the distribution of privatization vouchers to citizens.

Early privatization efforts primarily focused on small-scale enterprises and housing stock, with the aim of fostering entrepreneurship and providing citizens with ownership stakes in the newly emerging market economy.

=== Mass privatization ===
The mid-1990s marked the onset of mass privatization, which sought to accelerate the transfer of medium and large enterprises to private ownership. By 1996, the government had largely completed the privatization of small-scale businesses, such as retail outlets and service providers.

In 1998, Ukraine completed the core phase of its mass privatization program, during which hundreds of state enterprises were sold or converted into joint-stock companies. The process often involved voucher auctions, where citizens could exchange their vouchers for shares in former state enterprises. However, the lack of regulatory oversight and transparency during this period led to widespread concerns about insider dealing and the concentration of wealth among a small group of business elites, later referred to as oligarchs.

In 2000, the government adopted the State Privatization Program for 2000–2002, which emphasized the need to privatize strategic industries, including those in natural monopolies, infrastructure, and large technological complexes. The program aimed to attract both domestic and foreign strategic investors, improve corporate governance, and enhance the competitiveness of Ukrainian enterprises in the global market.

=== Privatization in the 2000s ===
During the 2000s, the pace of privatization in Ukraine slowed considerably, influenced by growing political instability, frequent changes in government, and rising public skepticism about the fairness of earlier privatization efforts. Successive administrations had differing priorities regarding state asset sales, resulting in an inconsistent and often delayed privatization agenda. While earlier programs aimed for rapid divestment, the focus in the 2000s shifted toward the sale of strategic enterprises, including those in energy, transport, and heavy industry, many of which remained under state control.

At the same time, international financial institutions such as the International Monetary Fund (IMF) and the World Bank played a significant role in shaping Ukraine's privatization and economic reform policies. As part of structural adjustment programs and loan conditions, these organizations urged the Ukrainian government to improve corporate governance, increase transparency in asset sales, and reduce the influence of oligarchic interests in the economy. Despite these pressures, the implementation of reforms was often uneven, hindered by institutional weaknesses and vested interests.

The period also saw the emergence of reprivatization debates, as some controversial deals from the 1990s were re-examined by the state. However, these efforts remained limited and politically contentious, and are more fully addressed in the next section.

=== Post-2014 Privatization reforms ===
Following the Revolution of Dignity in 2014, Ukraine undertook renewed efforts to reform its economy and reduce the influence of oligarchic structures, with privatization once again becoming a key policy tool. The post-2014 government, supported by international partners such as the International Monetary Fund (IMF), the World Bank, and the European Union, prioritized improving transparency, modernizing state-owned enterprises (SOEs), and attracting foreign investment. A major shift occurred in 2018 with the adoption of a new privatization law, which simplified procedures, introduced electronic auctions via the Prozorro.Sale system, and categorized assets into "small" and "large" privatization to streamline their sale processes.

Despite these reforms, progress was uneven. Political uncertainty, legal challenges, and resistance from vested interests continued to delay the sale of major assets, especially in strategic sectors such as energy and infrastructure. Nevertheless, some notable successes were recorded, particularly in small-scale privatizations, which became more transparent and competitive due to digitalization. The government has continued to frame privatization as part of broader anti-corruption and efficiency reforms, though public skepticism and geopolitical instability — especially after the 2022 Russian invasion of Ukraine — have posed new challenges to sustaining momentum.

== Reprivatization efforts ==
Reprivatization in Ukraine refers to the process of reviewing, annulling, or reversing past privatization deals, particularly those carried out during the 1990s under non-transparent or allegedly corrupt conditions. The most prominent case occurred in 2005, when the government under Prime Minister Yulia Tymoshenko revisited the controversial 2004 privatization of Kryvorizhstal, a major steel producer, which had been sold to a consortium linked to politically connected businessmen for a significantly undervalued price. Following a court ruling that annulled the original sale, Kryvorizhstal was re-auctioned in a highly publicized and competitive tender. It was ultimately sold to Mittal Steel (now part of ArcelorMittal) for $4.8 billion, a sum more than five times higher than the original sale price, and the largest privatization deal in Ukraine's history.

Other reprivatization efforts targeted enterprises such as the Nikopol Ferroalloy Plant (NZF), the Nikopol South Pipe Plant, and the Dnipropetrovsk Pipe Plant, all of which had been transferred to private ownership under disputed circumstances. These attempts to reverse earlier privatizations were often politically charged, generating both domestic and international legal disputes, and raising concerns among investors regarding property rights and the stability of the investment environment. While some reprivatization cases succeeded, most remained mired in legal uncertainty, contributing to broader debates about the rule of law and the legacy of Ukraine's early transition to a market economy.

== Controversies and criticism ==
Ukraine's privatization process has long been a subject of criticism and controversy, particularly due to concerns about lack of transparency, undervaluation of assets, and the emergence of oligarchic power structures. In March 2003, then-Minister of Finance Mykola Azarov remarked that over the course of a decade (1992–2002), the state budget had received only 5.41 billion hryvnias (approximately 1.1 billion USD) from privatization. He stated::

"It turns out that half of the country's economy was valued at one billion US dollars. This already suggests that privatisation was carried out according to schemes far from those according to which it should have been carried out by law. We were unable to make it an instrument of economic development"

Critics argue that during the early years of privatization, state assets were frequently sold below market value, often to insiders or politically connected individuals, through non-competitive tenders, opaque voucher schemes, or rigged auctions. This process facilitated the concentration of wealth and economic power in the hands of a small group of individuals—later known as oligarchs—who gained control over strategic industries such as metallurgy, energy, and telecommunications. Moreover, insufficient legal safeguards and weak institutional oversight allowed for asset stripping, tax evasion, and inefficient management of former state enterprises.

International organizations and Ukrainian civil society repeatedly called for reforming the privatization framework to ensure transparency, fair valuation, and public trust. Although later stages of privatization, particularly after 2014, saw improvements in procedures and the introduction of electronic auctions, skepticism remained due to the legacy of earlier misconduct and persistent issues with rule of law and corporate governance.
