= Land Use Policy =

Peer-reviewed scientific journal

- Discipline: Urban studies and planning
- Language: English
- Edited by: Uchendu Chigbu, Xiaoling Zhang

Publication details
- History: 2004-present
- Publisher: Elsevier
- Frequency: Monthly
- Open access: Hybrid
- Impact factor: 6.0 (2023)

Standard abbreviations
- ISO 4: Land Use Policy

Indexing
- ISSN: 0264-8377 (print); 1873-5754 (web)
- LCCN: 2004233412
- OCLC no.: 781521779

Links
- Journal homepage; Online archive

Land use policy is a monthly peer-reviewed scientific journal covering various aspects of land use research. It is published by Elsevier and was established in 2004. The editors-in-chief are Uchendu Chigbu (Namibia University of Science and Technology) and Xiaoling Zhang (University of Hong Kong).

The journal publishes research articles, reviews, and commentaries related to rural land use, including land use policies, geography, agriculture, and forestry.

== Abstracting and indexing ==
The journal is abstracted and indexed in:

- CAB Abstracts
- EBSCO databases
- ProQuest databases
- Science Citation Index Expanded
- Scopus

According to the Journal Citation Reports, the journal has a 2022 impact factor of 7.1.
