= Joseph J. Anthony =

American politician

Major Joseph J Anthony

Member of the Arkansas House of Representatives from the Randolph County district
- In office November 2, 1836 – December 4, 1837

Personal details
- Died: December 4, 1837 Little Rock, Arkansas

Joseph J. Anthony (1780?–1837) was soldier, Arkansas pioneer, and a member of the Arkansas House of Representatives. He was killed by John Wilson, the speaker of his legislative chamber, during a debate on its floor.

== Early life ==
Major J. J. Anthony was born circa 1780 in Virginia to Reverend Joseph Anthony, a minister of the Baptist faith, and Jane Ferris. The family moved to Tennessee and by 1808, they were living in Smith County. Just before the War of 1812, Anthony was appointed second lieutenant of the United States Twenty-fourth Infantry. He rose to the rank of first lieutenant in 1813, after commanding a company of Tennessee troops at Fort Stephenson on Lake Erie. To avoid being court martialed on charges of cowardice and dereliction of duty, Anthony resigned his commission. He re-enlisted as an assistant adjutant general under Andrew Jackson, which gained him the lifelong distinction of major.

== Life and politics in Arkansas ==
After the conclusion of the war, Anthony returned to Tennessee where he became a businessman and farmer. By 1830 he had moved to Madison County, Missouri; however, he set up a farm in soon-to-be-established Randolph County, Arkansas, in 1835. Anthony was elected to the Arkansas General Assembly in 1836. He immediately caused controversy. An anonymous letter published in the Arkansas Advocate attacked him as a political pawn for Chester Ashley and William E. Woodruff. Anthony was also ridiculed for his short military career.

== Murder ==
On December 4, 1837, the Arkansas General Assembly were gathered to review legislature. An amendment was proposed for a bill that paid citizens for wolf scalps; however, Anthony made remarks about the speaker of the House and newly elected Real Estate Bank of Arkansas, John Wilson. These remarks were not taken well and Wilson attacked Anthony with a bowie knife.

Anthony was buried at Little Rock's then-public graveyard, located where the Little Rock Federal Building is now located on Capitol Avenue. His remains may still be at the location, as he is not listed as being removed to Mount Holly Cemetery in 1860 when others were transferred. Anthony never married and had no immediate heirs.
