= Real Estate Bank of Arkansas =

Bank in 19th-century Arkansas

- Company type: state bank
- Industry: Banking
- Founded: 1836
- Defunct: 1855
- Fate: Liquidated, assets transferred to state
- Headquarters: Little Rock, Arkansas
- Number of locations: 5
- Area served: Arkansas

The Real Estate Bank of Arkansas was a bank in Arkansas during the 1830s through 1850s. Formed in 1836, the bank had a troubled history with accusations of waste and favoritism, as well as violations of the bank's legal charter. The bank suspended specie payments in 1839 to allow it to lend out more money. Paper money issued by the bank lost value, and the bank entered trusteeship in 1842. An act of the Arkansas legislature approved of the transfer to the trustees in 1843, but the trustees did not forward information to the state and personally benefited from the arrangement. In 1853, the Arkansas legislature passed a bill to have the Arkansas Attorney General take the bank to chancery court, but the filing could not be made until 1854 because of lack of cooperation from the trustees. April 1855 saw the bank's assets transferred from the trustees to the state, and in 1856 the first full public accounting of the bank's finances was made. The bonds related to the bank were not fully extinguished until 1894, and a portion of them, known as the Holford Bonds, proved particularly problematic.

== History ==
=== Establishment ===
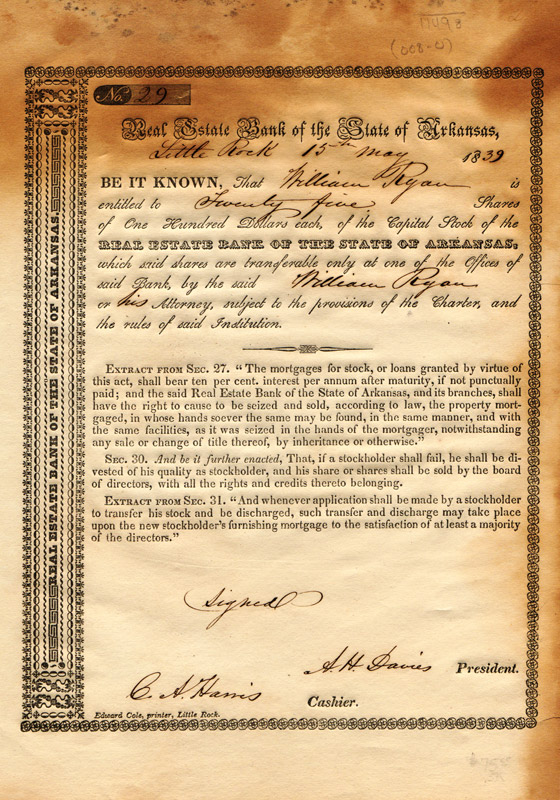
1839 stock certificate from the bank

Support for a state bank in Arkansas began during the time of the Arkansas Territory. This was considered a priority due to a lack of banking west of the Mississippi River, a shortage of coins in the region, and few banks in the area being allowed to issue paper money. After Arkansas became a state, the 1836 establishment of the Real Estate Bank of Arkansas was the first piece of legislation passed by the new government. Politically, the bank was widely supported. Two Whigs, Anthony H. Davies and John Ringgold, produced the charter for the bank, and the legislature that approved its creation was controlled by the Democratic Party. The bank's officials were of a Democrat-to-Whig ratio that was similar to that of the state's population. The enabling legislation required the bank to issue $2,000,000 of bonded indebtedness at five percent, with a maturity in 25 years. The state government appointed a quarter of the bank's board of directors, but took no part in the active management of the organization. Another requirement of the bank was to send reports to the state legislature, and the bank could borrow on the state's credit. The bank was intended to promote the interest of planters, an intention that was stated in the enabling legislation. The banking committee in the state legislature was composed almost entirely of men representing planting areas along rivers, and the voting to establish the bank was only opposed by representatives from northern Arkansas. The interests in the northern portion of the state were somewhat appeased by the establishment of another state bank to have branches in Fayetteville and Batesville.

The 284 or 325 stock subscribers of the bank, most of whom were prominent leaders in Arkansas, appointed the rest of the board of directors. Most of the stockholders lived along either the Mississippi River or the Red River of the South. To become a subscriber, a person could put up to $30,000 of security to the bank, and then borrow up to half of that amount. Stockholders had preferential terms with the bank, as they could borrow money before others, did not have to pay back money until after others, and could borrow for longer periods of time. These securities were intended to be used as surety for the bank with the state, although each stockholder was only liable for the amount borrowed. Many of the lands used as surety were fraudulently overappraised, including those of an author of the bank's charter and a United States senator. While the bank was authorized to issue $2,250,000 of stock, more than this was subscribed to, and a five-man board met to determine who would receive the limited shares of stock. Four of the five members of the board, both United States senators, Arkansas's United States Representative, and the Governor of Arkansas received some of the stock. Of the 22,500 shares available, 6,286 went to residents of a single county.

=== Operation and suspension of specie payment ===
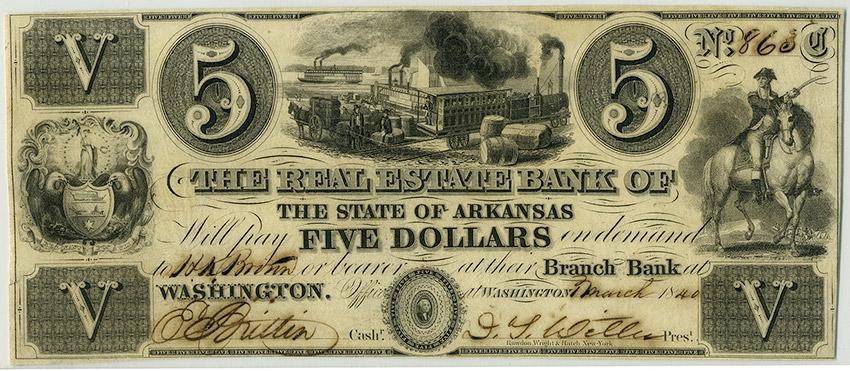
1840 $5 paper currency issued by the bank

In 1837, the bank was debated in the Arkansas legislature, with accusations of waste and favoritism. Resolutions critical of the bank were either heavily edited or ignored. Trouble also occurred with the bonds, which were now difficult to sell due to the Panic of 1837. The state raised the interest rate on the bonds to six percent, but was still unable to find much of a market for them. The president of the bank, John Wilson, who was also Speaker of the Arkansas House of Representatives, killed a congressman critical of the bank in a fight on the floor of the legislature. After the fight, Davies became president, and he sent U.S. Senator Ambrose H. Sevier and T. T. Williamson, who would become president of a branch of the bank, to New York City to sell bank bonds in exchange for specie and paper money. Legally, the bank was permitted to issue paper money, but only in denominations of $5.00 or greater. Sevier and Williamson kept some of these proceeds for themselves, and lent more of it to friends in New York City. The bank opened a head branch in Little Rock in December 1838, with other branches in Columbia, Washington, and Helena opening in early 1839. A fourth branch was later added in Van Buren; it too opened in early 1839. May 1839 saw a challenge to the constitutionality of the bank, with the Arkansas Supreme Court ruling in favor of its legality.

By November, the bank had stopped paying out specie, allowing it to lend more money that it had in reserve, using a fractional reserve policy. Accountants who examined the bank's finances came to the determination that the only apparent reason for suspending specie payments was to lend out more money than would have been possible if specie payments were continuing. Historian Ed Stebbins has described the discontinuation of specie payments as "wholly unnecessary". It was also against the rules set forth in the bank's charter. The bank had $153,910 in paper money in circulation at the time, but a year later, that number was at $759,000, although it fell to $450,000 in 1841. This paper money soon lost its value, and with interest payments due on the bonds, the bank had to borrow $121,000, using 500 unsold bank bonds as collateral. The bank the loan was made to then treated the bonds as having been sold to them, and sold them to a bank in London. This sale was not discovered in Arkansas until 1842, and as the New York bank had gone out of business by then, it could not be determined if the transfer should be considered a sale of bonds or a loan backed by the bonds. These 500 bonds became known as the Holford Bonds, and remained outstanding until an Arkansas constitutional amendment repudiated them in 1884. The state refused to recognize a liability to the London bank. The disputed transfer to the New York bank was itself illegal, and some of the money was possibly used to purchase paper money from the bank to reduce the loss in value. Making matters worse, the bank's debtors often paid back the bank with its own depreciated currency. Specie was generally reserved to pay the bank's officers, and when the officers had to be paid in paper money, they were paid at two- or three-to-one. In May 1841, the bank's directors decided to destroy all notes on hand, as well as all that would be received in the future. The bank was also beset by corruption and mismanagement.

=== Trusteeship ===
While the $121,000 received from the New York bank temporarily created a monetary surplus for the bank, that surplus was soon loaned out to bank officers and stockholders. Money collected from loans was not enough to sustain cash flows, and the bank had to issue more loans and notes payable at a discount. One particular issue only netted the bank 20 cents on the dollar. The bank sued to collect some debts, but netted little after legal fees. When it seized collateral to settle debts, it found that the collateral had been overvalued. By 1840, public opinion was turning strongly against the bank. When an 1841 legislative report found no issues with how the bank was operated, most of the legislators involved in the report were voted out in the next election. There was outcry for a special session of the legislature to deal with the bank problem, but the governor did not order one because he knew that it would not be effective, as more than a third of the legislature owed money to the bank.

Smaller creditors who owed money to the bank also placed pressure on it, as many felt that the bank was favoring larger interests. A court in Phillips County was forced to close in 1841 after its plan to auction lands of defaulted debtors led to an uprising. On April 2, 1842, the bank's board of directors passed the bank into trusteeship, taking power away from the legislature-established boards of the bank. These boards were initially hesitant to pass power to the trustees, who owed the bank over $150,000. It was hoped that the 15 trustees would bring better management to the bank. It was intended for the bank's assets to be liquidated, any paper money to be bought back, the bond interest to be paid, and any remaining loans to be collected within eight years. Effectively, the transfer resulted in the state remaining responsible for the bond debt, but not having control of the bank's assets. The transfer was also challenged in court, with it being upheld by a two-to-one majority of the Arkansas Supreme Court; one of the justices in the majority had outstanding debt to the bank. A January 1843 law approved of the transfer to trustees, with the requirement that 10 be elected by stockholders, but there is no evidence that these elections ever occurred. The legislation had little practical effect on how the bank was run, and the trustees profited materially from their roles. The 1843 legislation also permitted the governor to establish prosecutors to sue the stockholders in order to recover their debts to the bank. In response, the trustees forfeited the bank's charter, which meant that it could no longer issue paper money.

The primarily Democratic trustees avoided scrutiny of the bank, and information requested by the state was never provided. As leaders of both the Democrats and Whigs were involved in the bank's management, neither party pushed for a full investigation. Over time, it became apparent that the bank could not recover, and it had to be determined how to pay back the remaining bonds that the state was liable for. Direct taxation would have been a solution, except that such a tax would have largely affected the planters who controlled the bank and the state government. The 1843 law authorizing the trusteeship had required that the number of trustees would decrease to five in 1844, with the new trustees to be partially appointed by the state and partially elected by the stockholders. Instead, the existing stockholders selected the five holdovers from among themselves; three of the final five trustees remained in their positions until 1855. Over the course of the trusteeship, the bank's assets were dissipated, and the bank was in worse financial shape at the end of the trusteeship than it was at the beginning.

=== State receivership ===
Although committees were formed annually and an 1846 constitutional amendment forbade the state from chartering additional banks, the Arkansas legislature passed no acts concerning the bank until 1853, when one was enacted ordering the Arkansas Attorney General to file in chancery court against the trustees to divest them of the bank's assets. Two attorneys were also hired to support the attorney general. The trustees failed to provide information necessary, and the filing was delayed until 1854; it was also found that the attorney general had not done anything to push for action. Once prepared, the filing accused the trustees of failing to allow the state the right to investigate the bank, that the reports made by the bank to the state were only for show, and that the assignment to trustees had been designed to take the bank's assets out of reach of the state. In January 1855, two laws were passed mandating an accounting of the bank's finances, establishing a designated chancery court to deal with situations related to the bank, and prohibiting lawsuits against the state related to the bank. The trustees of the bank attempted to challenge the constitutionality of the chancery court, but the establishment of the court was upheld by the Arkansas Supreme Court. In April, a chancery court transferred the bank's assets from the trustees to the state. Charles F. M. Noland was appointed as the first receiver for the bank's assets, a position that carried with it a $3,500 salary and the use of the bank's Little Rock office. Noland was removed in November, as it was felt that he was not moving quickly enough to complete instructions given him by the governor, and was replaced by Gordon N. Peay. Despite being a former cashier of the bank, a secretary for the trustees, and a named defendant in a lawsuit related to the bank, Peay as court clerk in Pulaski County signed the order appointing himself as trustee. In 1856, financial records for the bank were publicly released for the first time.

As late as 1859, how to pay off the debts remaining from the bank was still a major political issue. An act by the legislature to reduce tax rates received a pocket veto by the governor, who believed that the tax surplus should be used to pay off some of the remaining debt from the failed bank. One congressional candidate, whose father in-law had been one of the trustees, argued that the debt should be paid off by foreclosing on mortgages held by the bank and suing the bank's stockholders to collect the property used as surety. The bonds themselves became due beginning in 1863, but were not paid off due to the secession of Arkansas and the American Civil War. In 1867, the bonds were renewed for another 25 years. In 1869, Governor Powell Clayton signed a bill into law that would have provided for the payment of the Holford Bonds, but this was controversial as many felt that the Holford debt was not legitimate debt of the state. The controversy related to the bonds continued poor credit for Arkansas. However, the bonds could not be immediately issued due to a lack of money to pay interest on them with. The Holford bonds remained controversial, and were never fully paid off; the 1884 repudiation was accomplished via a congressional amendment. An 1891 property tax bill also appropriated $300,000 of funds to pay back the bonds; those not held by the United States Treasury were paid off using the appropriation and the tax. The bonds held by the Treasury would not be retired until 1894, when an agreement was made to cancel the bonds and extinguish the debt in return for Arkansas dropping claims against the federal government related to 1850 land grants. In the words of historian Ted R. Worley, "a system of special privilege had flourished by using the forms of democracy to further its own ends". Confidence in Arkansas's financial structure was not wholly restored until the beginning of the 20th century.

== Sources ==
- Gitelman, Morton (1996). "The First Chancery Court in Arkansas". Arkansas Historical Quarterly. 55 (4): 357–382. doi:10.2307/40027867. JSTOR 40027867.
- Neal, Diane; Kremm, Thomas W. (1993). Lion of the South: General Thomas C. Hindman. Macon, Georgia: Mercer University Press. ISBN 0-86554-422-0.
- Stebbins, Ed (1954). "Early Banking in Arkansas". Arkansas Historical Quarterly. 13 (4): 409–413. doi:10.2307/40024158. JSTOR 40024158.
- Thompson, George H. (1969). "Reconstruction and the Loss of State Credit". Arkansas Historical Quarterly. 28 (4): 293–308. doi:10.2307/40038064. JSTOR 40038064.
- Worley, Ted R. (1950). "The Control of the Real Estate Bank of Arkansas, 1836–1855". Mississippi Valley Historical Review. 37 (3): 403–426. doi:10.2307/1893319. JSTOR 1893319.
