= List of speakers of the Arkansas House of Representatives =

Speaker of Arkansas House of Representatives
- House of Representatives seal
- Incumbent; Brian S. Evans since January 13, 2025
- Style: The Honorable (diplomatic); Mister Speaker (within the assembly)
- Seat: Arkansas State Capitol
- Appointer: Arkansas House of Representatives
- Term length: Two years
- Constituting instrument: Constitution of Arkansas
- Inaugural holder: John Wilson
- Formation: September 12, 1836
- Succession: 4th
- Website: http://www.arkansashouse.org/

The speaker of the Arkansas House of Representatives is the speaker (presiding officer) of the Arkansas House of Representatives, the lower house of the Arkansas General Assembly. They serve as the leader and head of the Arkansas House, and can control what legislation comes to a vote. The speaker's counterpart in the State Senate is the president of the Senate. There has never been a woman speaker.

== Position legacy ==
Some early speakers went on to prominent political careers or leveraged the position into statewide positions. John Roane, James Berry, James P. Eagle and others became governor in the years after serving as speaker. J. C. Tappan was twice nominated by the Democrats, but declined to run both times. Albert Rust, Edward A. Warren, and Lewis E. Sawyer became US Representatives.

In recent times, the speaker has been a veteran member of the General Assembly.

== Territorial House of Representatives ==
- Ambrose H. Sevier, 1827

== List of speakers ==
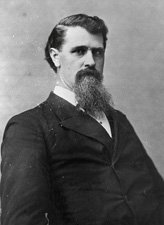
James Berry served as speaker during Elisha Baxter's extraordinary session in 1874.

| # | Speaker | Took office | Left office | Party | Notes | Session |
|---|---|---|---|---|---|---|
| 1 | John Wilson | September 12, 1836 | December 4, 1837 | Democratic | (Note: Expelled from the House for killing J. J. Anthony.) | 1st |
| 2 | Grandison Royston | December 4, 1837 | November 5, 1838 | Democratic | (Note: Special session) | 1st |
| 3 | Gilbert Marshall | November 5, 1838 | November 2, 1840 | Democratic | | 2nd |
| 4 | George Hill | November 2, 1840 | November 7, 1842 | Democratic | | 3rd |
| 5 | W. S. Oldham | November 7, 1842 | November 4, 1844 | Democratic | | 4th |
| 6 | John S. Roane | November 4, 1844 | November 2, 1846 | Democratic | | 5th |
| 7 | Albert Rust | November 2, 1846 | November 4, 1848 | Democratic | | 6th |
| 8 | Edward A. Warren | November 4, 1848 | November 4, 1850 | Democratic | | 7th |
| 9 | T. B. Flournoy | November 4, 1850 | November 1, 1852 | Democratic | | 8th |
| 10 | Benjamin P. Jett | November 1, 1852 | November 6, 1854 | Democratic | | 9th |
| 11 | Samuel Mitchell | November 6, 1854 | November 1, 1858 | Democratic | | 10th, 11th |
| 12 | O. H. Oates | November 1, 1858 | November 5, 1860 | Democratic | | 12th |
| 13 | Bradley Bunch | November 5, 1860 | November 5, 1862 | Democratic | | 13th |
| 14 | John Harrell | November 5, 1862 | April 11, 1864 | Democratic | | 14th |
| 15 | H. B. Allis | April 11, 1864 | September 22, 1864 | Democratic | | 15th |
| — | J. F. Lowry | September 22, 1864 | October 2, 1864 | Democratic | | In exile |
| 16 | Bradley Bunch | November 5, 1866 | April 2, 1868 | Democratic | | 16th |
| 17 | J. G. Price | April 2, 1868 | January 2, 1871 | Democratic | | 17th |
| 18 | C. W. Tankersley | January 2, 1871 | May 11, 1874 | Democratic | | 18th, 19th |
| 19 | James Berry | May 11, 1874 | May 28, 1874 | Democratic | (Note: Extraordinary Session) | 19th |
| 20 | A. A. Pennington | November 10, 1874 | January 8, 1877 | Democratic | | 20th |
| 21 | D. L. Kilgore | January 8, 1877 | January 13, 1879 | Democratic | | 21st |
| 22 | J. T. Bearden | January 13, 1879 | January 8, 1881 | Democratic | | 22nd |
| 23 | George Thornburgh | January 8, 1881 | January 8, 1883 | Democratic | | 23rd |
| 24 | W. C. Braley | January 8, 1883 | January 12, 1885 | Democratic | | 24th |
| 25 | James P. Eagle | January 12, 1885 | January 10, 1887 | Democratic | | 25th |
| 26 | J. M. Hewitt | January 10, 1887 | January 10, 1889 | Democratic | | 26th |
| 27 | B. B. Hudgins | January 10, 1889 | January 12, 1891 | Democratic | | 27th |
| 28 | Elias W. Rector | January 12, 1891 | January 9, 1893 | Democratic | | 28th |
| 29 | T. C. Humphrey | January 9, 1893 | January 14, 1895 | Democratic | | 29th |
| 30 | John C. Colquitt | January 14, 1895 | January 11, 1897 | Democratic | | 30th |
| 31 | J. C. Tappan | January 11, 1897 | January 9, 1899 | Democratic | | 31st |
| 32 | A. F. Vandeventer | January 9, 1899 | January 14, 1901 | Democratic | | 32nd |
| 33 | T. H. Humphreys | January 14, 1901 | January 12, 1903 | Democratic | | 33rd |
| 34 | John I. Moore | January 12, 1903 | January 9, 1905 | Democratic | | 34th |
| 35 | William W. Cate | January 9, 1905 | January 14, 1907 | Democratic | | 35th |
| 36 | Allen Hamiter | January 14, 1907 | January 11, 1909 | Democratic | | 36th |
| 37 | F. E. Brown | January 11, 1909 | January 12, 1911 | Democratic | | 37th |
| 38 | R. F. Milwee | January 12, 1911 | January 13, 1913 | Democratic | | 38th |
| 39 | Joe Hardage | January 13, 1913 | January 11, 1915 | Democratic | | 39th |
| 40 | L. E. Sawyer | January 11, 1915 | January 8, 1917 | Democratic | | 40th |
| 41 | Lee Cazort | January 8, 1917 | January 13, 1919 | Democratic | | 41st |
| 42 | C. P. Newton | January 13, 1919 | | Democratic | (Note: Resigned.) | 42nd |
| 43 | Joe Joiner | January 26, 1920 | January 8, 1923 | Democratic | (Note: Elected Speaker for the Third Extraordinary Session of the 42nd General Assembly.) | 42nd, 43rd |
| 44 | Howard Reed | January 8, 1923 | January 12, 1925 | Democratic | | 44th |
| 45 | Thomas A. Hill | January 12, 1925 | January 10, 1927 | Democratic | | 45th |
| 46 | Reece Caudle | January 10, 1927 | January 14, 1929 | Democratic | | 46th |
| 47 | W. H. Abington | January 14, 1929 | January 12, 1931 | Democratic | | 47th |
| 48 | Irving C. Neale | January 12, 1931 | January 9, 1933 | Democratic | | 48th |
| 49 | Kemp Toney | January 9, 1933 | January 14, 1935 | Democratic | | 49th |
| 50 | Harve B. Thorn | January 14, 1935 | January 11, 1937 | Democratic | | 50th |
| 51 | John M. Bransford | January 11, 1937 | January 13, 1941 | Democratic | | 51st, 52nd |
| 52 | Means Wilkinson | January 13, 1941 | January 11, 1943 | Democratic | | 53rd |
| 53 | R. W. Griffith | January 11, 1943 | January 8, 1945 | Democratic | | 54th |
| 54 | Horace Northcutt | January 8, 1945 | January 13, 1947 | Democratic | | 55th |
| 55 | Roy L. Riales Sr. | January 13, 1947 | January 10, 1949 | Democratic | | 56th |
| 56 | Carl Hendrix | January 10, 1949 | January 8, 1951 | Democratic | | 57th |
| 57 | James R. Campbell | January 8, 1951 | January 12, 1953 | Democratic | | 58th |
| 58 | Carroll Hollensworth | January 12, 1953 | January 10, 1955 | Democratic | | 59th |
| 59 | Charles F. Smith | January 10, 1955 | January 14, 1957 | Democratic | | 60th |
| 60 | Glenn Walther | January 14, 1957 | January 12, 1959 | Democratic | | 61st |
| 61 | E. C. Fleeman | January 12, 1959 | January 9, 1961 | Democratic | | 62nd |
| 62 | John P. Bethell | January 9, 1961 | January 14, 1963 | Democratic | | 63rd |
| 63 | Marion Crank | January 14, 1963 | January 11, 1965 | Democratic | | 64th |
| 64 | J. H. Cottrell Jr. | January 11, 1965 | January 19, 1967 | Democratic | | 65th |
| 65 | Sterling R. Cockrill | January 9, 1967 | January 13, 1969 | Democratic | | 66th |
| 66 | Hayes McClerkin | January 13, 1969 | January 11, 1971 | Democratic | | 67th |
| 67 | Ray S. Smith, Jr. | January 11, 1971 | January 8, 1973 | Democratic | | 68th |
| 68 | Buddy Turner | January 8, 1973 | January 13, 1975 | Democratic | | 69th |
| 69 | Cecil L. Alexander | January 13, 1975 | January 10, 1977 | Democratic | | 70th |
| 70 | James L. Shaver, Jr. | January 10, 1977 | January 8, 1979 | Democratic | | 71st |
| 71 | John E. Miller | January 8, 1979 | January 12, 1981 | Democratic | | 72nd |
| 72 | Lloyd McCuiston | January 12, 1981 | January 10, 1983 | Democratic | | 73rd |
| 73 | John Paul Capps | January 10, 1983 | January 14, 1985 | Democratic | | 74th |
| 74 | Lacy Landers | January 14, 1985 | January 1987 | Democratic | | 75th |
| 75 | Ernest Cunningham | January 1987 | January 1989 | Democratic | | 76th |
| 76 | B. G. Hendrix | January 1989 | January 1991 | Democratic | | 77th |
| 77 | John Lipton | January 1991 | January 1993 | Democratic | | 78th |
| 78 | Doc Bryan | January 1993 | January 1995 | Democratic | | 79th |
| 79 | Bobby Hogue | January 1995 | January 1999 | Democratic | | 80th, 81st |
| 80 | Bob Johnson | January 1999 | January 2001 | Democratic | | 82nd |
| 81 | Shane Broadway | January 2001 | January 2003 | Democratic | | 83rd |
| 82 | Herschel W. Cleveland | January 2003 | January 2005 | Democratic | | 84th |
| 83 | Bill Stovall | January 2005 | January 2007 | Democratic | | 85th |
| 84 | Benny Petrus | January 2007 | January 2009 | Democratic | | 86th |
| 85 | Robbie Wills | January 2009 | January 2011 | Democratic | | 87th |
| 86 | Robert S. Moore Jr. | January 2011 | January 2013 | Democratic | | 88th |
| 87 | Davy Carter | January 2013 | January 2015 | Republican | | 89th |
| 88 | Jeremy Gillam | January 2015 | June 15, 2018 | Republican | (Note: Resigned.) | 90th, 91st |
| 89 | Matthew Shepherd | June 15, 2018 | January 13, 2025 | Republican | | 91st, 92nd, 93rd, 94th |
| 90 | Brian S. Evans | January 13, 2025 | Present | Republican | | 95th |

== See also ==
- Governor of Arkansas
- List of presidents pro tempore of the Arkansas Senate
- List of Arkansas General Assemblies

== Bibliography ==
- Priest, Sharon (1998). Runnells, Jonathan (ed.). Historical Report of the Arkansas Secretary of State. Office of the Arkansas Secretary of State. ISBN 9780313302121. OCLC 40157815.
