= 48th Arkansas General Assembly =

Term of state legislature in Arkansas, US

| ← | 47th | 49th | → |
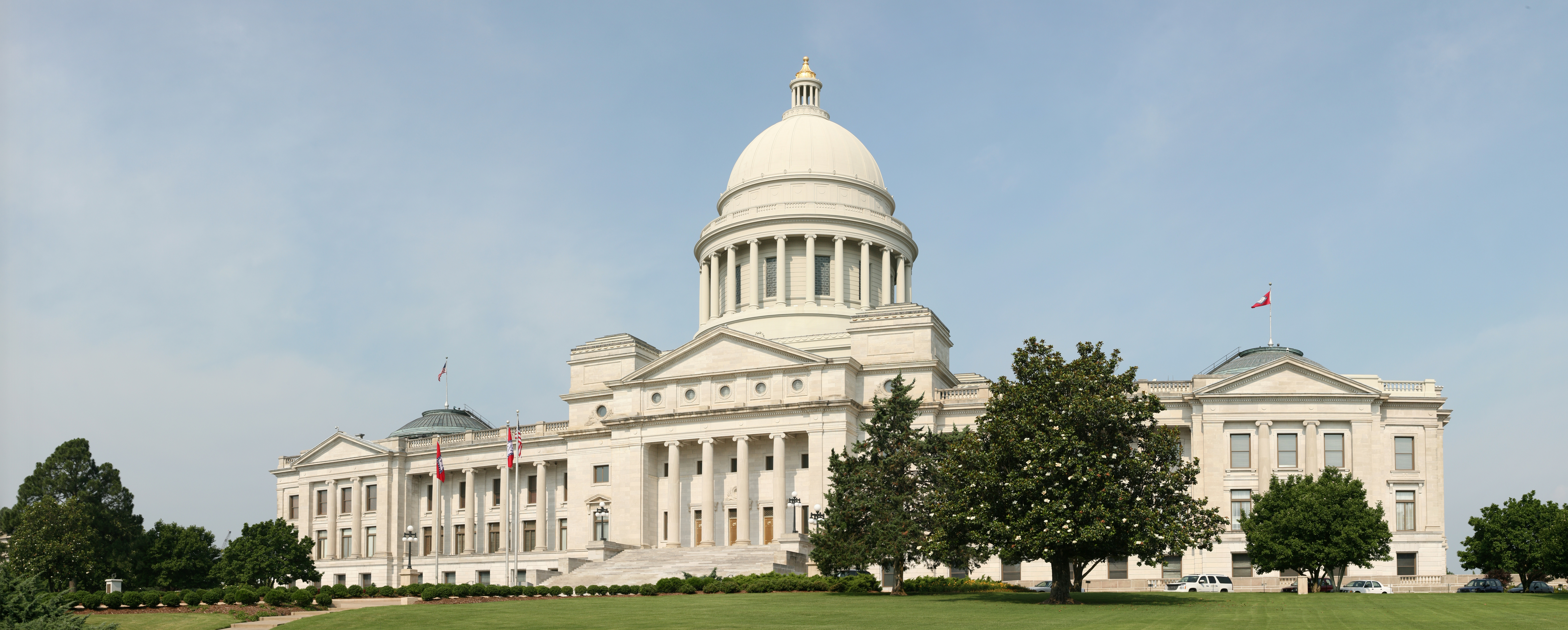
- Arkansas State Capitol (2009)

Overview
- Term: January 12, 1931 – May 12, 1933

Arkansas Senate
- Senate party standings
- Members: 35 (35 Democratic Party)
- President of the Senate: Lawrence Wilson (D)
- Party control: Democratic Party

House of Representatives
- House party standings
- Members: 100 (99 Democratic Party, 1 R)
- House Speaker: Irving Neale (D)
- Party control: Democratic Party

Sessions
- 1st: January 12, 1931 – May 12, 1931
- 2nd: October 7, 1931 –
- 3rd: March 15, 1932 – April 12, 1932

The Forty-Eighth Arkansas General Assembly was the legislative body of the state of Arkansas in 1931 and 1932. In this General Assembly, the Arkansas Senate and Arkansas House of Representatives were both controlled by the Democrats. In the Senate, all 35 senators were Democrats, and in the House, 99 representatives were Democrats, with one Republican. It was the first General Assembly to use redistricted legislative districts from the 1930 United States census.

== Major events ==
=== Vacancies ===
- Senator Granville Jones (D-31st) died, replaced by L. Walter Wheatley by election
- Representative William U. McCabe (D-Baxter County) died, no record of a successor being elected or appointed
- Representative S. A. Turner (D-Cleburne County) died, no record of a successor being elected or appointed

=== Appointments ===
- Senator R. E. Spence is appointed to the 1st Senatorial District due to the resignation of his father, W. E. Spence.

== Legislative summary ==
The 48th General Assembly generally dealt with routine matters. They created the county highway fund and abolished the elected office of Arkansas State Superintendent of Public Instruction, converting the office to the Arkansas Commissioner of Education, which was appointed by the Arkansas Board of Education.

Governor Parnell sought approval from the legislature to send a government reorganization plan to the voters. The plan would have reduced all state elections to once every four years, with only the governor, lieutenant governor, and attorney general remaining as elected officials and reorganizing the executive branch into twelve departments. The plan was viewed as an increase in the governor's power and never gained traction with the legislature.

A special session was called in October 1931 to reduce 1932 acreage in cotton cultivation by 30% from 1931 levels (to reduce overproduction). A second special session was called in March 1932 for a myriad of subjects. The legislature ratified the lame duck amendment to the United States Constitution and dealt with various financial matters in the state, some caused by the Great Depression in the United States. Though the governor's stated matters had been dealt with, the House voted 82-7 against adjourning on April 12. Governor Parnell then declared the session over, overriding the vote. However, a rump group of 69 House members persisted until the Arkansas Supreme Court disbanded the proceedings on April 14.

== Senate ==
The senate was controlled completely the Democratic party. Eighteen senators were lawyers, five were farmers, three were merchants, with one each listing their occupation as: cotton buyer, insurance man, editor, banker, manufacturer, minister, car dealer, and doctor.

=== Leadership ===
- President of the Senate: Lawrence Wilson
- Secretary: M. E. Sherland

=== Senators ===
| District | Senator | Party | First elected | Counties |
|---|---|---|---|---|
| 1 | W. E. Spence | Democratic | 1928 | Clay, Craighead, Greene |
| 2 | Richard C. Waldron | Democratic | 1928 | Lawrence, Randolph, Sharp |
| 3 | Roy Milum | Democratic | 1922 | Boone, Marion, Newton |
| 4 | Robert L. Bailey | Democratic | 1930 | Johnson, Pope |
| 5 | Robert J. Wilson | Democratic | 1920 | Washington |
| 6 | J. P. Ward | Democratic | 1930 | Independence, Stone |
| 7 | J. L. Shaver | Democratic | 1930 | Cross, Woodruff |
| 8 | J. N. George | Democratic | 1928 | Logan, Yell |
| 9 | Joe W. Kimsey | Democratic | 1928 | Grant, Hot Spring, Saline |
| 10 | Ed B. Dillon | Democratic | 1926 | Perry, Pulaski |
| 10 | G. W. Hendricks | Democratic | 1930 | Perry, Pulaski |
| 11 | Creed Caldwell | Democratic | 1916 | Jefferson |
| 12 | T. P. Atkins | Democratic | 1930 | Lonoke, Prairie |
| 13 | Elmo Chaney | Democratic | 1928 | Arkansas, Monroe |
| 14 | John M. Quarles | Democratic | 1928 | Lee, Phillips |
| 15 | J.A. Bennett | Democratic | 1930 | Ashley, Chicot |
| 16 | Tate McGehee | Democratic | 1928 | Cleveland, Dallas, Lincoln |
| 17 | W. F. Norrell | Democratic | 1930 | Desha, Drew |
| 18 | Duvall L. Perkins | Democratic | 1928 | Bradley, Union |
| 19 | Charles L. Poole | Democratic | 1930 | Calhoun, Ouachita |
| 20 | Lawrence L. Mitchell | Democratic | 1930 | Hempstead, Nevada |
| 21 | Ned A. Stewart | Democratic | 1930 | Columbia, Lafayette, Miller |
| 22 | Winfred Lake | Democratic | 1930 | Howard, Little River, Sevier |
| 23 | William H.V. Wahlquist | Democratic | 1928 | Baxter, Fulton, Izard |
| 24 | Mike I. Shuster | Democratic | 1930 | Carroll, Madison |
| 25 | C. R. Counts | Democratic | 1928 | Crawford, Franklin |
| 26 | Guy Walls | Democratic | 1930 | Conway, Cleburne, Searcy, Van Buren |
| 27 | W. H. Abington | Democratic | 1930 | White, Faulkner |
| 28 | J. F. Brewer | Democratic | 1924 | Sebastian |
| 29 | R. A. Nelson | Democratic | 1928 | Jackson, Mississippi, Poinsett |
| 30 | Fletcher McElhannon | Democratic | 1930 | Clark, Pike |
| 31 | Granville Jones | Democratic | 1928 | Garland, Montgomery |
| 32 | Marvin B. Norfleet | Democratic | 1930 | Crittenden, St. Francis |
| 33 | J. A. Thornton | Democratic | 1924 | Polk, Scott |
| 34 | Storm O. Whaley | Democratic | 1930 | Benton |

== House of Representatives ==
The House was controlled by the Democratic party, with only one Republican member. Democratic hegemony was typical in Arkansas and throughout the American South during the Solid South period. Thirty-three members of the House were lawyers, with 21 farmers, 5 insurance men, 4 teachers, 4 doctors, 4 bankers, and three ministers. The remaining members held a variety of occupations, including one homemaker, Ethel Cole Cunningham, the only female member of the 48th General Assembly.

=== Leadership ===
- Speaker of the House: Irving Neal

=== Representatives ===
| County | Representative | Party | First elected |
|---|---|---|---|
| Arkansas | Ballard Deane | Democratic | 1928 |
| Ashley | F. H. Switzer | Democratic | 1930 |
| Baxter | William U. McCabe | Democratic | 1930 |
| Benton | William J. Bullock | Democratic | 1928 |
| Benton | E. S. Graham | Democratic | 1930 |
| Boone | Louis Dowell | Democratic | 1930 |
| Bradley | Carroll Hollensworth | Democratic | 1930 |
| Calhoun | Marcus W. Proctor | Democratic | 1930 |
| Carroll | Ted P. Coxsey | Democratic | 1930 |
| Chicot | Carneal Warfield | Democratic | 1930 |
| Clark | T. N. Wilson | Democratic | 1930 |
| Clark | Joe M. Thomas | Democratic | 1930 |
| Clay | Earl Day | Democratic | 1930 |
| Cleburne | S. A. Turner | Democratic | 1930 |
| Cleveland | George F. Brown | Democratic | 1928 |
| Columbia | Wade Kitchens | Democratic | 1928 |
| Columbia | S. A. Crumpler | Democratic | 1930 |
| Conway | Charlie C. Eddy | Democratic | 1930 |
| Conway | Edward H. Sellers | Democratic | 1929 (App) |
| Craighead | Archer Wheatley | Democratic | 1928 |
| Crawford | J. Arthur Spinks | Democratic | 1930 |
| Crawford | Jim Scott | Democratic | 1930 |
| Crittenden | Robert Eberhart | Democratic | 1930 |
| Cross | Sam A. Gooch | Democratic | 1930 |
| Dallas | L. E. Purdy | Democratic | 1926 |
| Desha | George D. Hester | Democratic | 1928 |
| Drew | John W. Kimbro | Democratic | 1930 |
| Faulkner | Kenneth Coffelt | Democratic | 1930 |
| Franklin | Junius Pugh Clayton | Democratic | 1928 |
| Franklin | John Bollinger | Democratic | 1930 |
| Fulton | H. O. Smith | Democratic | 1928 |
| Garland | Elmer Tackett | Democratic | 1930 |
| Garland | R. L. Gilliam | Democratic | 1930 |
| Grant | Paul Clark | Democratic | 1928 |
| Greene | J. Ed Thompson | Democratic | 1928 |
| Hempstead | I. L. Pilkington | Democratic | 1930 |
| Hempstead | Curtis Cannon | Democratic | 1928 |
| Hot Spring | James T. Morehead | Democratic | 1930 |
| Howard | W. H. Toland | Democratic | 1930 |
| Independence | L. O. Latting | Democratic | 1930 |
| Independence | Virgil James Butler | Democratic | 1930 |
| Izard | Tillman E. Lawrence | Democratic | 1928 |
| Jackson | Oran D. Watson | Democratic | 1930 |
| Jefferson | H. Kemp Toney | Democratic | 1930 |
| Jefferson | Sam M. Levine | Democratic | 1930 |
| Jefferson | H. Ben Feinberg | Democratic | 1930 |
| Johnson | Daniel W. Johnston | Democratic | 1928 |
| Lafayette | Guy G. Boyett | Democratic | 1930 |
| Lawrence | Jay Hamilton Myers | Democratic | 1930 |
| Lee | F. N. Burke | Democratic | 1930 |
| Lee | W. L. Ward | Democratic | 1930 |
| Lincoln | Joe C. Hardin | Democratic | 1930 |
| Little River | W. D. Waldrop | Democratic | 1930 |
| Logan | W. M. Wade | Democratic | 1928 |
| Logan | Henry Stroupe | Democratic | 1930 |
| Lonoke | John M. Bransford | Democratic | 1930 |
| Lonoke | W. B. Graham | Democratic | 1930 |
| Madison | Charles L. McElhaney | Democratic | 1930 |
| Marion | George H. Perry | Democratic | 1930 |
| Miller | B. F. Arnold | Democratic | 1930 |
| Mississippi | E. E. Alexander | Democratic | 1923 |
| Monroe | Ben Hassell | Democratic | 1930 |
| Montgomery | Harold Watkins | Democratic | 1930 |
| Nevada | J. B. Silvey | Democratic | 1930 |
| Newton | William Boyd Pruitt | Democratic | 1928 |
| Ouachita | R. K. Mason | Democratic | 1930 |
| Perry | G. N. Parmenter | Democratic | 1930 |
| Phillips | E. D. Robertson | Democratic | 1930 |
| Phillips | Edwawrd S. Dudley | Democratic | 1930 |
| Pike | Fletcher B. Clement | Democratic | 1930 |
| Poinsett | H. B. Thorn | Democratic | 1930 |
| Polk | John T. Owen | Democratic | 1928 |
| Pope | J. B. Evans | Democratic | 1930 |
| Pope | J. W. Danley | Democratic | 1930 |
| Prairie | V. A. Rogers | Democratic | 1930 |
| Pulaski | H. B. Stubblefield | Democratic | 1930 |
| Pulaski | Tom Newton | Democratic | 1930 |
| Pulaski | Murray O. Reed | Democratic | 1930 |
| Pulaski | Morgan Smith | Democratic | 1928 |
| Randolph | J. E. Smith | Democratic | 1930 |
| St. Francis | Charles Fleming | Democratic | 1930 |
| Saline | Charles D. Ewell | Democratic | 1930 |
| Scott | L. D. Duncan | Democratic | 1930 |
| Searcy | S. E. Hollabaugh | Republican | 1930 |
| Sebastian | Irving Neale | Democratic | 1924 |
| Sebastian | Henry Kaufman | Democratic | 1930 |
| Sebastian | John Clay | Democratic | 1930 |
| Sevier | James R. Campbell | Democratic | 1928 |
| Sharp | Sidney Kelley | Democratic | 1930 |
| Stone | Joe Ward | Democratic | 1930 |
| Union | T. P. Oliver | Democratic | 1930 |
| Van Buren | Joe S. Hall | Democratic | 1930 |
| Washington | Wilson Cardwell | Democratic | 1926 |
| Washington | Irvin R. Rothrock | Democratic | 1928 |
| Washington | Virgil Ramsey | Democratic | 1930 |
| White | J. M. Talkington | Democratic | 1930 |
| White | J. A. Adkins | Democratic | 1930 |
| Woodruff | Walter W. Raney | Democratic | 1930 |
| Yell | W. C. Blackwell | Democratic | 1930 |
| Yell | Ethel Cole Cunningham | Democratic | 1930 |

== See also ==
- List of Arkansas General Assemblies
