= 49th Arkansas General Assembly =

Term of state legislature in Arkansas, US

←	48th	50th	→
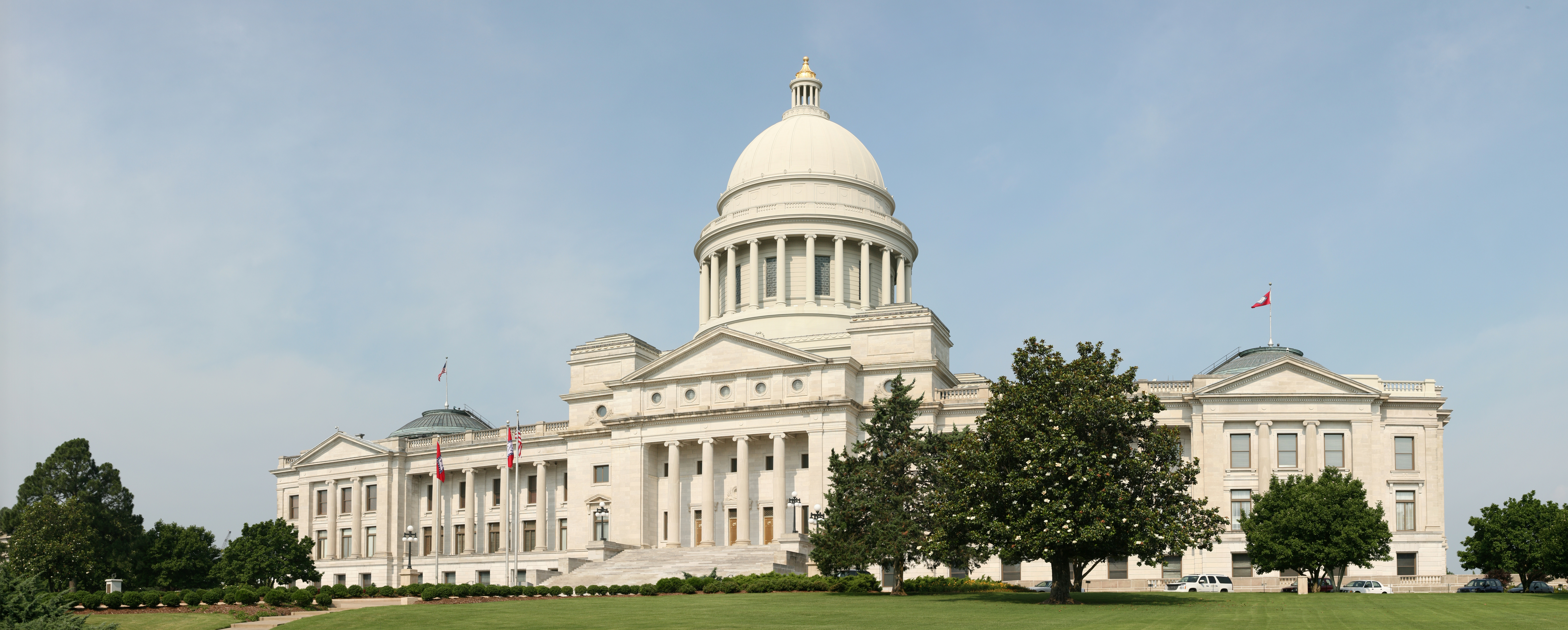
- Arkansas State Capitol (2009)

Overview
- Term: January 9, 1933 – March 9, 1933

Arkansas Senate
- Senate party standings
- Members: 35 (35 Democratic Party)
- President of the Senate: Lee Cazort (D)
- Party control: Democratic Party

House of Representatives
- House party standings
- Members: 100 (100 Democratic Party)
- House Speaker: H. K. Toney (D)
- Party control: Democratic Party

Sessions
- 1st: January 9, 1933 – March 9, 1933

The Forty-Ninth Arkansas General Assembly was the legislative body of the state of Arkansas in 1933 and 1934. In this General Assembly, all 35 positions in the Arkansas Senate and 100 positions in the Arkansas House of Representatives were both controlled by the Democrats.

== Major events ==
Democratic hegemony was typical in Arkansas and throughout the American South during the Solid South period.

=== Vacancies ===
- Senator John Fred Parish (D-29th) was contested, and R. A. Nelson was seated on January 9, 1933
- Representative Ethel Cole Cunningham (D-Yell County) resigned at the end of the regular session but is carried as absent non-voting

== Senate ==
The senate was completely controlled the Democratic party. Fifteen freshman senators took seats in the chamber, including John Fred Parish (D-29th), who successfully contested the reelection of incumbent R. A. Nelson, who was seated at the beginning of the session.

=== Leadership ===
- President of the Senate: Lee Cazort

=== Senators ===
District	Senator	Party	First elected	Counties
1	C. B. Gregg	Democratic	1932	Clay, Craighead, Greene
2	Andrew J. Cole	Democratic	1932	Lawrence, Randolph, Sharp
3	Roy Milum	Democratic	1922	Boone, Marion, Newton
4	Robert L. Bailey	Democratic	1930	Johnson, Pope
5	Wilson Cardwell	Democratic	1932	Washington
6	J. Paul Ward	Democratic	1930	Independence, Stone
7	J. L. Shaver	Democratic	1930	Cross, Woodruff
8	Charles I. Evans	Democratic	1932	Logan, Yell
9	Marvin N. Harris	Democratic	1932	Grant, Hot Spring, Saline
10	Ed B. Dillon	Democratic	1926	Perry, Pulaski
10	G. W. Hendricks	Democratic	1930	Perry, Pulaski
11	Sam Levine	Democratic	1932	Jefferson
12	T. P. Atkins	Democratic	1930	Lonoke, Prairie
13	G. C. Carnes	Democratic	1928	Arkansas, Monroe
14	William L. Ward	Democratic	1932	Lee, Phillips
15	J.A. Bennett	Democratic	1930	Ashley, Chicot
16	A. J. Johnson	Democratic	1932	Cleveland, Dallas, Lincoln
17	W. F. Norrell	Democratic	1930	Desha, Drew
18	Tom Marlin	Democratic	1932	Bradley, Union
19	Charles L. Poole	Democratic	1930	Calhoun, Ouachita
20	Lawrence L. Mitchell	Democratic	1930	Hempstead, Nevada
21	Ned A. Stewart	Democratic	1930	Columbia, Lafayette, Miller
22	Winfred Lake	Democratic	1930	Howard, Little River, Sevier
23	John C. Ashley	Democratic	1932	Baxter, Fulton, Izard
24	Mike I. Shuster	Democratic	1930	Carroll, Madison
25	Ivo W. Gilbert	Democratic	1932	Crawford, Franklin
26	Guy Walls	Democratic	1930	Conway, Cleburne, Searcy, Van Buren
27	W. H. Abington	Democratic	1930	White, Faulkner
28	Fred Armstrong	Democratic	1932	Sebastian
29	R. A. Nelson	Democratic	1928	Jackson, Mississippi, Poinsett
30	Fletcher McElhannon	Democratic	1930	Clark, Pike
31	L. Walter Wheatley	Democratic	1932	Garland, Montgomery
32	Marvin B. Norfleet	Democratic	1930	Crittenden, St. Francis
33	R. L. Crutchfield	Democratic	1932	Polk, Scott
34	Storm O. Whaley	Democratic	1930	Benton

== House of Representatives ==
The House was almost entirely new, with 73 freshmen members. Only three members had first won election to the House in 1928.

=== Leadership ===
- Speaker of the House: H. K. Toney

=== Representatives ===
County	Representative	Party	First elected
Arkansas	Louis K. Burkle	Democratic	1932
Ashley	T. G. Morgan	Democratic	1932
Baxter	M. R. Pryor	Democratic	1932
Benton	John W. Nance	Democratic	1932
Benton	Clyde T. Ellis	Democratic	1932
Boone	Louis Dowell	Democratic	1930
Bradley	Carroll Hollensworth	Democratic	1930
Calhoun	Marcus W. Proctor	Democratic	1930
Carroll	Ted P. Coxsey	Democratic	1930
Chicot	E. B. Cone	Democratic	1932
Clark	C. R. Huie	Democratic	1932
Clark	George H. Wells	Democratic	1932
Clay	C. O. Raley	Democratic	1932
Cleburne	Eddie J. Dunn	Democratic	1932
Cleveland	O. E. Gates	Democratic	1932
Columbia	Joe L. Davis	Democratic	1932
Columbia	S. A. Crumpler	Democratic	1930
Conway	J. H. Reynolds	Democratic	1932
Conway	Steve Combs	Democratic	1932
Craighead	Orris B. Elgin	Democratic	1932
Crawford	James W. Smith	Democratic	1932
Crawford	Jim Scott	Democratic	1930
Crittenden	W. W. Harris	Democratic	1932
Cross	Sam A. Gooch	Democratic	1930
Dallas	W. M. Caraway	Democratic	1932
Desha	Scott McGehee	Democratic	1932
Drew	Charles H. Killian	Democratic	1932
Faulkner	J. C. Dawson	Democratic	1932
Franklin	John Bollinger	Democratic	1930
Franklin	W. R. Bumpers	Democratic	1932
Fulton	H. A. Northcutt	Democratic	1932
Garland	Elmer Tackett	Democratic	1930
Garland	C. A. Stanfield	Democratic	1932
Grant	A. J. Stephens	Democratic	1932
Greene	J. Ed Thompson	Democratic	1928
Hempstead	Luke F. Monroe	Democratic	1932
Hempstead	Ernest G. Steed	Democratic	1932
Hot Spring	H. S. Thomas	Democratic	1932
Howard	Jack Owen	Democratic	1932
Independence	Virgil James Butler	Democratic	1930
Independence	W. P. Detherow	Democratic	1932
Izard	W. W. Copeland	Democratic	1932
Jackson	Henry S. Grant	Democratic	1932
Jefferson	H. Kemp Toney	Democratic	1930
Jefferson	Hendrix Rowell	Democratic	1932
Jefferson	Carleton Harris	Democratic	1932
Johnson	Armil Taylor	Democratic	1932
Lafayette	R. T. Boulware	Democratic	1932
Lawrence	E. E. Kelley	Democratic	1932
Lee	A. L. Wilsford	Democratic	1932
Lee	Eugene Hampton	Democratic	1932
Lincoln	Joe C. Hardin	Democratic	1930
Little River	W. D. Waldrop	Democratic	1930
Logan	John M. Willems	Democratic	1932
Logan	Joseph O. Horton	Democratic	1932
Lonoke	John M. Bransford	Democratic	1930
Lonoke	A. J. Walls	Democratic	1932
Madison	Charles L. McElhaney	Democratic	1930
Marion	Earl Berry	Democratic	1932
Miller	Ben E. Carter	Democratic	1932
Mississippi	Curtis J. Little	Democratic	1932
Monroe	Fred N. McCollum	Democratic	1932
Montgomery	Harold Watkins	Democratic	1930
Nevada	Alfred E. Cross	Democratic	1932
Newton	Ernest Cheatham	Democratic	1932
Ouachita	Richard K. Mason	Democratic	1930
Perry	G. B. Colvin	Democratic	1932
Phillips	Leo Nyberg	Democratic	1932
Phillips	Luther J. Wilkes	Democratic	1932
Pike	Fletcher B. Clement	Democratic	1930
Poinsett	H. B. Thorn	Democratic	1930
Polk	Marcus L. Miller	Democratic	1932
Pope	John G. Rye	Democratic	1932
Pope	Neal King	Democratic	1932
Prairie	J. W. Watson	Democratic	1932
Pulaski	Morgan Smith	Democratic	1928
Pulaski	J. S. Murphy	Democratic	1932
Pulaski	Ellis M. Fagan	Democratic	1932
Pulaski	David D. Terry	Democratic	1932
Randolph	J. E. Smith	Democratic	1930
St. Francis	B. McCollum	Democratic	1932
Saline	B. B. McCall	Democratic	1932
Scott	Lorenzo D. Duncan	Democratic	1930
Searcy	Zeb V. Ferguson	Democratic	1932
Sebastian	Henry Kaufman	Democratic	1930
Sebastian	Earl Dunn	Democratic	1932
Sebastian	Means Wilkinson	Democratic	1932
Sevier	Minor W. Millwee	Democratic	1932
Sharp	James M. Simpson	Democratic	1932
Stone	William O. Edmondson	Democratic	1932
Union	Sam D. Crawford	Democratic	1932
Van Buren	Joe S. Hall	Democratic	1930
Washington	Irvin R. Rothrock	Democratic	1928
Washington	Rufus J. Nelson	Democratic	1932
Washington	W. H. Norton	Democratic	1932
White	J. A. Choate	Democratic	1932
White	Oscar L. Akin	Democratic	1932
Woodruff	Roger Williams	Democratic	1932
Yell	Ethel Cole Cunningham	Democratic	1930
Yell	Neill Bohlinger	Democratic	1932

== See also ==
- List of Arkansas General Assemblies
