= 1940 Arkansas elections =

Arkansas held a general election on November 5, 1940. At the top of the ticket, Franklin D. Roosevelt won the state handily in his reelection bid. For the United States House of Representatives, five of the six Representatives seeking reelection were unopposed in the general election. In the Arkansas 7th, Oren Harris defeated Wade Kitchens in the Democratic primary and was unopposed in the general election.

All of Arkansas's statewide constitutional offices were up for reelection, including governor. During the Solid South, the Democratic Party held firm control of virtually every office in The South, including Arkansas. Winning the Democratic primary was considered tantamount to election, with several different factions of the party battling in the open primaries. Incumbent governor Carl E. Bailey was primaried by Homer Adkins who defeated Republican Harley C. Stump in a landslide election; all other state constitutional offices were held by the Democrats without general election opposition.

== Federal ==
=== Senate ===
No Senate elections were held this year in Arkansas.

== State ==
Arkansas Democrats started the nomination process for a primary to be held on August 13, 1940. The Democratic primary runoff was held on August 27, 1940.

=== Governor ===
County results, gubernatorial County results Adkins: 50–60% 60–70% 70–80% 80–90% >90% Adkins: 50–60% 60–70% 70–80% 80–90% 90%+ Stump: Did not win any countie

=== Lieutenant governor ===
Incumbent Bob Bailey won the nomination for Lieutenant Governor of Arkansas from a five-candidate field in the Democratic primary. Though initially failing to secure a majority, Bailey was given the Democratic nomination when John M. Bransford withdrew before the runoff.

Democratic primary, 1940
Party	Candidate	Votes	%
Democratic	Lieutenant Governor Bob Bailey	109,016	44.0
Democratic	John M. Bransford	58,360	23.5
Democratic	Hal P. Smith	41,002	16.5
Democratic	Harve B. Thorn	21,846	8.8
Democratic	L.E. Coleman	17,807	7.1
Total votes		248,031	100.0

==== Attorney general ====
Incumbent Jack Holt defeated M. M. Martin in the Democratic primary runoff to win nomination for a third term.

Democratic primary runoff, 1940
Party	Candidate	Votes	%
Democratic	Attorney General Jack Holt	107,935	72.8
Democratic	M. M. Martin	40,426	27.2
Total votes		148,361	100.0

==== Secretary of State ====
Incumbent Crip Hall won the nomination for Arkansas Secretary of State from a four-candidate field in the Democratic primary.

==== Auditor ====
Auditor J. Oscar Humphrey was renominated for a sixth term without opposition.

==== Treasurer ====
Incumbent Earl Page sought a third term. He was challenged by Kenneth Satterfield of Dardanelle, an employee of the state revenue department. Former treasurer Roy V. Leonard was also mentioned to have interest in running, but declined.

==== State Land Commissioner ====
Incumbent Otis Page won the nomination for Arkansas Secretary of State from a three-candidate field in the Democratic primary.
