= Shane Broadway =

American politician

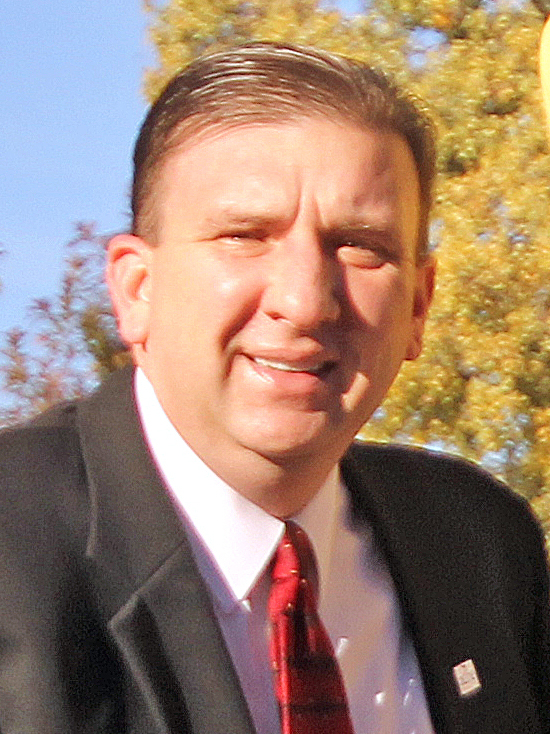
- Broadway in 2013

Member of the Arkansas Senate from the 22nd district
- In office January 13, 2003 – January 10, 2011
- Preceded by: Alvin Simes (redistricted)
- Succeeded by: Jeremy Hutchinson

81st Speaker of the Arkansas House of Representatives
- In office January 8, 2001 – January 13, 2003
- Preceded by: Bob Johnson
- Succeeded by: Herschel W. Cleveland

Member of the Arkansas House of Representatives from the 46th district
- In office January 13, 1997 – January 13, 2003
- Preceded by: Larry Mitchell
- Succeeded by: Marvin Parks

Personal details
- Born: August 30, 1972 (age 54) Benton, Arkansas, U.S.
- Party: Democratic
- Spouse: Debbie Tableriou (m. 1996)
- Education: Arkansas State University
- Occupation: Public servant and university administrator

Shane Broadway (born August 30, 1972) is a former Democratic state legislator, serving in the Arkansas General Assembly from 1997 to 2011 with a focus on education policy. Following an unsuccessful bid for Arkansas Lieutenant Governor in 2010, Broadway served as interim director of the Arkansas Department of Higher Education, and is currently the Vice President for University Relations at the Arkansas State University System in Little Rock.

== Personal life and education ==
Broadway was born in Benton to parents Charles and Bertha Broadway on August 30, 1972. He attended Bryant High School in Central Arkansas, graduating in 1990. He attended Arkansas State University in Jonesboro, graduating with a bachelor's degree in political science in 1994 and receiving the Robert E. Lee Wilson Award and the Distinguished Service Award. Broadway married the former Debbie Tableriou in a ceremony at the Arkansas State Capitol in March 1996.

== Career ==
=== Politics ===
Broadway was elected to the Arkansas House of Representatives in 1996, serving until 2002. He became Speaker of the Arkansas House during his tenure. Broadway was elected to the Arkansas Senate in 2002 and was re-elected in 2006.

In 2010, Broadway ran for Lieutenant Governor of Arkansas, but lost by two points to Mark Darr. Broadway was endorsed by Mike Beebe, who won reelection in the 2010 Arkansas gubernatorial election.

=== Education ===
Beebe appointed Broadway as director of the Arkansas Department of Higher Education a few months later. The Republican legislature objected to Broadway's nomination as he didn't meet the requirement as "an experienced educator in the field of higher education" according to the law. Broadway's successor in the Senate, Jeremy Hutchinson, unsuccessfully sought to change the requirement to allow Broadway to fill the post. Broadway remained interim director until taking a position with the Arkansas State University System in 2013. The requirement was later changed when Asa Hutchinson nominated Johnny Key, who also lacked experience as an educator, in 2015.

Party political offices
Preceded by Bill Halter	Democratic nominee for Lieutenant Governor of Arkansas; 2010	Succeeded by John Burkhalter
Political offices
Preceded by Alvin Simes (became 17th District)	Arkansas Senate; 22nd District; January 2003 – January 10, 2011	Succeeded by Jeremy Hutchinson
Preceded by Bob Johnson	Speaker of the Arkansas House of Representatives; 2001 – January 2003	Succeeded by Herschel W. Cleveland
Preceded by Larry Mitchell	Arkansas House of Representatives; 46th District; 2001 – January 2003	Succeeded by Marvin Parks
