= Senator Capps =

Senator Capps may refer to:

- Gilmer Capps (1932–2019), Oklahoma State Senate
- John Paul Capps (born 1934), Arkansas State Senate
