= Cecil Alexander =

Cecil Alexander may refer to:

- Cecil Alexander (architect) (1918–2013), American architect
- Cecil L. Alexander (1935–2026), American politician in Arkansas
- Cecil Frances Alexander (1818–1895), Anglo-Irish hymn-writer and poet
