= Missouri Blue Lodges =

Missouri Blue Lodges were secret proslavery societies formed in western Missouri during 1854 to thwart Northern anti-slavery plans to make Kansas a free state under the Kansas-Nebraska Act. They not only promoted the migration of proslavery settlers to Kansas but occasionally crossed the border to participate in the election of proslavery members to the territorial government.

== Massachusetts Lodges ==
One formation of the Blue Lodges was due to a man named Eli Thayer. He founded the organization the New England Emigrant Aid company in 1854. The movement proposed to send 20,000 free soldiers into Kansas each year. However, it failed to attract many numbers. Instead, this aroused proslavery advocates to create secret societies known as the Blue Lodges, taking place in Massachusetts. The members of the Blue Lodges were so closely associated with the Watie party that they were known primarily by that name or by the Southern Rights Party. They were referred jokingly by their enemies as “the Knaves of the Godless Communion”. Some think that Stand Watie was also the leader of many Lodges. The society's oath required those who enter to be fully pro-slavery and to protect their country from the ravages of abolitionists or any other combinations of people wishing to disrupt the nation. The members were then organized into encampments or ‘lodges’ that were overlooked by lieutenants and captains who would call upon the members to assist in capturing and punishing any and all abolitionists in the area who were actively interfering with slavery.

== Missouri Blue Lodges ==
There was a man named Joseph O. Shelby and friends who were from Missouri. They were rich slave owners who strongly opposed the Kansas-Nebraska Act, were pro-slavery, and also started the first few Missouri Blue Lodges. The men knew that they could not take on the Kansas-Nebraska Act, so they only had one option: influence the upcoming elections (1854). They were fully reserved to do it. The main men were Jo Shelby, David Atchison, General Benjamin F. Stringfellow, and Claiborne Jackson. They carried their plan into effect with all of the ruthless efficiency they were capable of. They used both natural aptitude for politics and military organization to create the Blue Lodges in Missouri. The lodges were based along Masonic lines. This lodge interested many fellow Missourians who hated the newly established act. Jo Shelby was the leader of this Missouri Blue Lodge.

== Blues Lodges and Cherokee Indians ==
Many people of this group had very close ties with white extremists in surrounding states and that had a strong influence with federal agents and officials of the Bureau of Indian Affairs, as some lodges supported Cherokee slavery strongly. There were a number of Blue Lodges also found in Arkansas, still promoting the one singular idea of slavery in Kansas. These lodges had a part to play when it came to pushing Cherokee Indians into the ranks of pro-slavery southern politics. There were a few possible suspects that could have aided in the formation of these Blue Lodges centered around Cherokees, all well-connected members of the Watie party: E. Cornelius Boudinot, John Rollin Ridge, J. Woodward Washbourne, Elias Rector, and George W. Paschal.

== Keetowah v. Blue Lodges ==
There was Evan Johns and his son John Buttrick Jones who went out to churches and told about what these lodges did, after receiving a copy of the oath taken to get into a Blue Lodge. This was an attempt to unite full-bloods into a cohesive force that could take down these lodges. This led to the formation of their group called the “Keetoowah”. The Keetoowah's sole mission was to create a new secret society that could counteract the actions of the Blue Lodges. Blue Lodges themselves described their enemy, the Keetoowah, as an abolitionist society under radical northern missionary dominations (Jones).

== Sources ==
- Dictionary of American History by James Truslow Adams, New York
- Federal Writers' Project. “The WPA Guide to Kansas.” Google Books, Trinity University Press, 2013, books.google.com/books?id=0VzpCAAAQBAJ.
- McLoughlin, William G. “After the Trail of Tears.” Google Books, UNC Press Books, 2014, books.google.com/books?id=bTxeBAAAQBAJ.
- O'Flahtery, Daniel. “General Jo Shelby.” Google Books, UNC Press Books, 2000, books.google.com/books?id=qQLCdigbP5YC.
