= Lucien Rogers =

Lucien C. Rogers was a state legislator in Arkansas. A Democrat, he represented Crittenden County. He served in the 59th Ariansas General Assembly. Charles F. Smith also represented Crittenden County in the Arkansas House for that term. He also served in the 60th Arkansas General Assembly in which Charles F. Smith served as Speaker.

He introduced several pieces of legislation in support of school segregation after the U.S. Supreme Court's Brown v. Board of Education ruling.
