= B. G. Hendrix =

American politician (1922–2020)

Member of the Arkansas House of Representatives
- In office 1962–1996

Speaker of the Arkansas House of Representatives
- In office 1989–1991
- Preceded by: Ernest Cunningham
- Succeeded by: John Lipton

Personal details
- Born: Bert Garrett Hendrix Jr. December 16, 1922 Jenny Lind, Arkansas, U.S.
- Died: March 21, 2020 (aged 97) Greenwood, Arkansas, U.S.
- Party: Democratic
- Occupation: politician

Bert Garrett Hendrix Jr. (December 16, 1922 – March 21, 2020), known as B. G. "Beagle" Hendrix, was an American politician from Arkansas.

Hendrix was born at Jenny Lind, Arkansas in 1922. He served for 34 years in the Arkansas House of Representatives for the Fort Smith district, and was Speaker of the Arkansas House of Representatives from 1989 to 1991. He was elected initially to the House in 1962. He also served as the Arkansas Attorney General for a brief period of time before retiring from the house in the 1990s. Hendrix died on March 21, 2020.
