= William Cate =

William Cate may refer to:

- William H. Cate (1839–1899), U.S. Representative from Arkansas
- William W. Cate (1870–1927), member of the Arkansas House of Representatives
