= Senator McCabe =

Senator McCabe may refer to:

- Brooks McCabe (born 1949), West Virginia State Senate
- James H. McCabe (1870–1957), New York State Senate
- William U. McCabe (1880–1931), Arkansas State Senate
