= John T. Bearden =

American politician

John Telemachus Bearden

Member of the Arkansas House of Representatives
- In office 1852–1853; 1879–1880

Speaker of the Arkansas House of Representatives
- In office 1879–1881
- Preceded by: Dawson L. Kilgore
- Succeeded by: George Thornburgh

Personal details
- Born: August 18, 1826 Knoxville, Tennessee
- Died: March 9, 1900 (aged 73) Los Angeles, California
- Party: Democratic
- Occupation: lawyer/judge

John Telemachus Bearden (August 18, 1826 – March 9, 1900) was a judge and politician in Arkansas. He was a Democratic member of the Arkansas House of Representatives.

He served as Speaker of the Arkansas House of Representatives in 1879.
