= Mack Thompson (disambiguation) =

Mack Thompson (1922–2003) was an American state legislator from Arkansas.

Mack Thompson may also refer to:

- Mack Thompson (musician), associate of Magic Sam
- Mack Thompson, fictional character in Z Nation
