= Senator Ingram =

Senator Ingram may refer to:

- Catherine Ingram (fl. 2010s–present), Ohio State Senate
- G. Erle Ingram (1883–?), Wisconsin State State Senate
- Keith Ingram (born 1955), Arkansas State Senate
- W. K. Ingram (1910–1981), Arkansas State Senate
