= Hardage =

Hardage is a surname. Notable people with the surname include:

- Joe Hardage (1869–1929), American politician
- Lewie Hardage (1891–1973), American college football player and coach
