= Fleeman =

Fleeman is a surname. Notable people with the surname include:

- Daniel Fleeman (born 1982), English racing cyclist
- E. C. Fleeman (1907–1962), American politician
- Jamie Fleeman (1713–1778), Scottish jester

== See also ==
- Freeman (surname)
