= Dawson L. Kilgore =

American politician

Member of the Arkansas House of Representatives
- In office 1856–1861, 1877–1878, 1889–1890, 1893

Speaker of the Arkansas House of Representatives
- In office 1877–1879
- Preceded by: A. A. Pennington
- Succeeded by: John T. Bearden

Personal details
- Born: October 23, 1823 Robertson County, Tennessee
- Died: April 2, 1893 (aged 69) Magnolia, Arkansas
- Party: Democratic
- Occupation: doctor

Dawson Lea Kilgore (October 23, 1823 – April 2, 1893) was an American politician. He was a Democratic member of the Arkansas House of Representatives.

He served as Speaker of the Arkansas House of Representatives in 1877.

He served in the Arkansas House of Representatives from 1856-1861, 1877-1878, 1889-1890, and 1893.
