= Knox Nelson =

Arkansas politician (1926–1996)

Member of the Arkansas Senate
- In office January 9, 1961 – January 14, 1991 Serving with Morrell Gathright until 1973
- Preceded by: Sam M. Levine
- Succeeded by: Jean Edwards
- Constituency: 20th district (1961–1973); 23rd district (1973–1983); 27th district (1983–1991)

President pro tempore of the Arkansas Senate
- In office January 8, 1979 – January 12, 1981
- Preceded by: W. K. Ingram
- Succeeded by: Ben Allen

Member of the Arkansas House of Representatives from Jefferson County
- In office January 14, 1957 – January 9, 1961 Serving with J. P. Walt and Carl Purnell
- Succeeded by: Buddy Turner

Personal details
- Born: April 3, 1926
- Died: June 4, 1996 (aged 70) Little Rock, Arkansas, U.S.
- Party: Democratic
- Spouse: Nancy Cearley (m. 1949)

Military service
- Branch/service: United States Army
- Rank: Staff sergeant
- Battles/wars: World War II; Pacific theater

Knox Nelson (April 3, 1926 – June 4, 1996) was a politician in Arkansas who served in the Arkansas House of Representatives and Arkansas Senate, including as President of the Arkansas Senate. He was a Democrat.

He served in the South Pacific during World War II. He was elected to the Arkansas House of Representatives in 1956 and served two terms.

He voted to lift rate limits on Arkansas Louisiana Gas Company and was rewarded financially by the company. He was elected to the Arkansas Senate in 1960 and won re-election until he was defeated by Jay Bradford in 1990. He and Max Howell were powerful long-serving state senators in Arkansas. He chaired the Southwest Regional Energy Council.
