= Ray S. Smith Jr. =

American politician

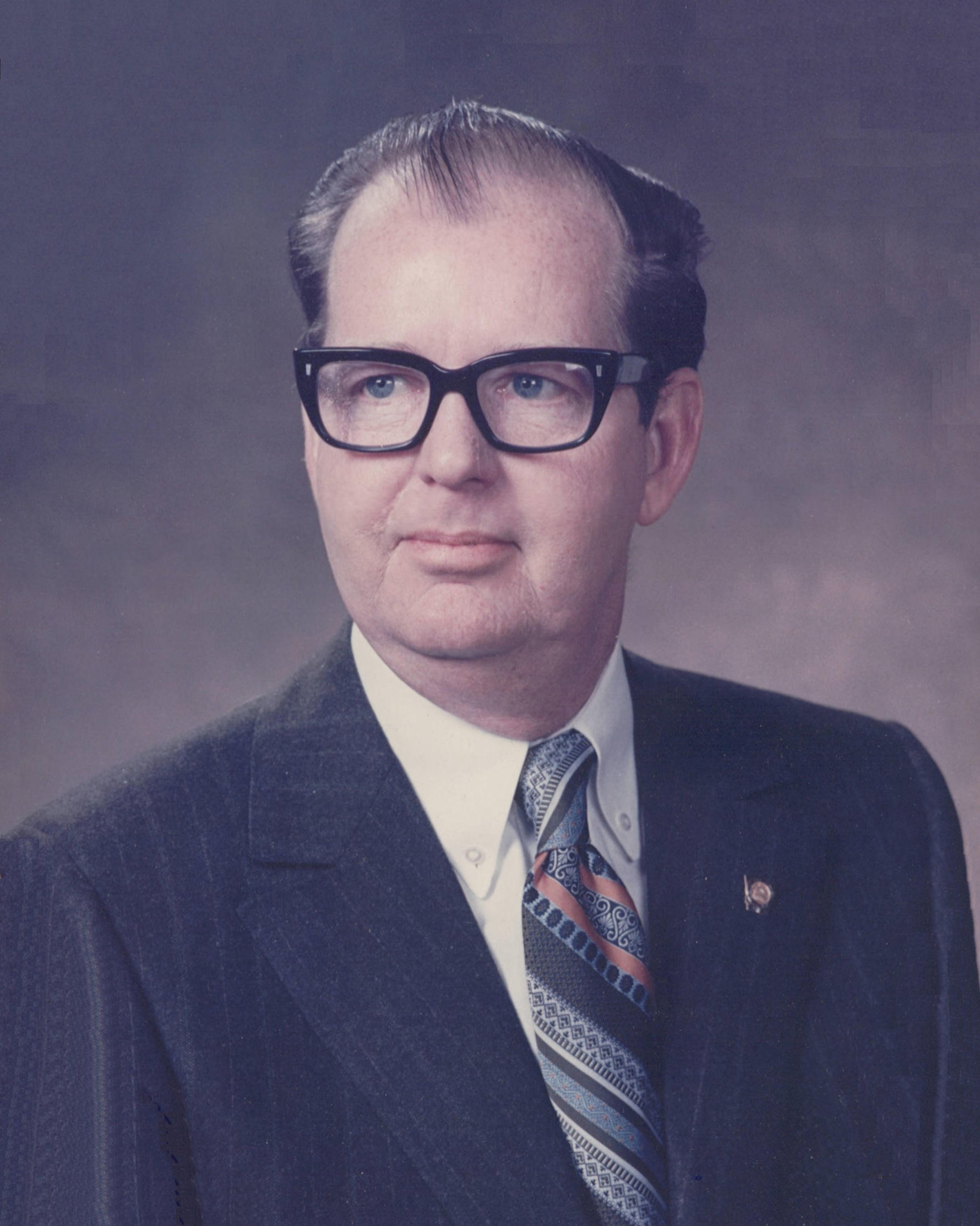
- Official portrait, 1971

67th Speaker of the Arkansas House of Representatives
- In office January 11, 1971 – January 8, 1973
- Preceded by: Hayes McClerkin
- Succeeded by: Buddy Turner

Member of the Arkansas House of Representatives
- In office January 10, 1955 – January 10, 1983
- Preceded by: James R. Campbell
- Succeeded by: John Parkerson
- Constituency: Garland County (1955–1967); 20th district (1967–1973); 35th district (1973–1983)

Personal details
- Born: Ray Sammons Smith Jr. February 4, 1924 Hot Springs, Arkansas, U.S.
- Died: November 1, 2007 (aged 83) Hot Springs, Arkansas, U.S.
- Party: Democratic
- Spouse: Patricia Floyd
- Education: Washington and Lee University (LLB)
- Occupation: Lawyer; politician

Military service
- Branch/service: United States Army; Army Air Forces
- Battles/wars: World War II

Ray Sammons Smith Jr. (February 4, 1924 – November 1, 2007) was an American politician. He was a member of the Arkansas House of Representatives, serving from 1961 to 1992. He was a member of the Democratic party.
