= Doc Bryan =

American politician

78th Speaker of the Arkansas House of Representatives
- In office January 11, 1993 – January 9, 1995
- Preceded by: John Lipton
- Succeeded by: Bobby Hogue

Member of the Arkansas House of Representatives
- In office January 9, 1967 – October 24, 1995
- Preceded by: Jimmy Dale Myatt
- Succeeded by: M. Olin Cook
- Constituency: 4th district (1967‍–‍1973); 28th district (1973‍–‍1983); 32nd district (1983‍–‍1993); 30th district (1993‍–‍1995)

Personal details
- Born: January 31, 1920 Coal Hill, Arkansas, U.S.
- Died: October 25, 1995 (aged 75) Little Rock, Arkansas, U.S.
- Party: Democratic
- Spouse: Martha Evelyn Chronister (m. 1940)
- Education: Arkansas Polytechnic College
- Occupation: Businessman; politician

Military service
- Branch/service: United States Navy
- Battles/wars: World War II

Leon Lloyd "Doc" Bryan (January 31, 1920 – October 24, 1995) was an American politician. He was a member of the Arkansas House of Representatives, serving from 1967 to 1995. He was a member of the Democratic party. He died of hepatitis in 1995. He was also the longtime Executive Director of the Arkansas Poultry Federation.
