= Elias W. Rector =

28th speaker of the Arkansas House of Representatives

28th Speaker of the Arkansas House of Representatives
- In office 1891–1893
- Preceded by: B. B. Hudgins
- Succeeded by: T. C. Humphrey

Member of the Arkansas House of Representatives
- In office 1887–1893

Personal details
- Born: Elias William Rector; June 11, 1849 Little Rock, Arkansas, U.S.
- Died: January 29, 1917 (aged 67) Hot Springs, Arkansas, U.S.
- Resting place: Hollywood Cemetery, Hot Springs, Arkansas, U.S. 34°29′08.3″N 93°02′38.6″W
- Party: Democratic
- Spouse: Rosebud Alcorn
- Parent: Henry M. Rector (father)
- Profession: Politician, lawyer

Elias William Rector (June 11, 1849 – January 29, 1917) was an American politician who served as the 28th speaker of the Arkansas House of Representatives from January 1891 to January 1893.

== Political career ==
Elias William Rector was a member of the Arkansas House of Representatives, serving from 1886 to 1900. A member of the Democratic Party, He was an elector for Grover Cleveland in the presidential election of 1892, and was a candidate for the Democratic nomination for Governor of Arkansas in 1889 and 1902.

== Personal life ==
Rector was the son of former Arkansas governor Henry M. Rector.
