= Hayes McClerkin =

American politician

Speaker of the Arkansas House of Representatives
- In office 1969–1970
- Preceded by: Sterling R. Cockrill
- Succeeded by: Ray S. Smith Jr.

Member of the Arkansas House of Representatives
- In office 1960–1970

Personal details
- Born: December 16, 1931 Texarkana, Arkansas
- Died: January 6, 2016 (aged 84) Texarkana, Arkansas
- Party: Democratic
- Children: 3
- Education: Washington and Lee University (BS); University of Arkansas (LLB)

Military service
- Branch/service: United States Navy

Hayes McClerkin (December 16, 1931 – January 6, 2016) was an American attorney and politician who served as a member of the Arkansas House of Representatives from 1960 to 1970 and Speaker of the House in 1969 and 1970.

== Early life and education ==
McClerkin was born and raised in Texarkana, Arkansas. McClerkin was a close childhood friend of Ross Perot. McClerkin graduated from Arkansas High School, where he played on the football team. He then earned a Bachelor of Science degree in commerce from Washington and Lee University. After graduating, McClerkin served in the United States Navy from 1953 until his discharge in 1956. McClerkin then earned a Bachelor of Laws from the University of Arkansas School of Law.

== Career ==
After graduating from law school, McClerkin was admitted to the Arkansas Bar Association and established a small legal practice with his former law classmates. McClerkin later joined a larger law firm. McClerkin served as a member of the Arkansas House of Representatives from 1960 to 1970 and Speaker of the House in 1969 and 1970. McClerkin was an unsuccessful candidate for the 1970 Arkansas gubernatorial election. In the 1980s, he worked as a law professor at the William H. Bowen School of Law. After serving as a board member of several organizations in Arkansas, McClerkin returned to politics as a Legislative Liaison under then-Governor Jim Guy Tucker from 1993 to 1995.

== Personal life ==
McClerkin had three daughters. In his retirement, he maintained a home in Kiawah Island, South Carolina. He died on January 6, 2016, at the age of 84.
