= Oliver H. Oates =

American politician and judge

Oliver H. Oates was an American lawyer, judge, and state legislator in Arkansas. He served as Speaker of the Arkansas House of Representatives from 1858-1859. From November 1860-November 1862 during the American Civil War, he served as Secretary of State of Arkansas.

Oates was born in South Carolina. In March 1839 he became a First Circuit Court judge. He was succeeded in 1860 by Earl C. Bronough. He represented Monroe County, Arkansas in the Arkansas House of Representatives.

Oates commanded a company during the American Civil War.

Oates' officeholding was the subject of an Arkansas Supreme Court case.
