= Roy L. Riales Sr. =

American politician

Member of the Arkansas Senate from the 6th district
- In office January 10, 1955 – January 14, 1963
- Preceded by: Jim Thornton Jr.
- Succeeded by: Nathan G. Coulter

President pro tempore of the Arkansas Senate
- In office January 12, 1959 – January 9, 1961
- Preceded by: J. Lee Bearden
- Succeeded by: Clifton Wade

55th Speaker of the Arkansas House of Representatives
- In office January 13, 1947 – January 10, 1949
- Preceded by: Horace Northcutt
- Succeeded by: Carl Hendrix

Member of the Arkansas House of Representatives from Polk County
- In office January 9, 1939 – January 10, 1949
- Preceded by: A. E. Wear
- Succeeded by: Floyd N. Eddleman

Personal details
- Born: Roy Lee Riales; December 24, 1909 Nunley, Polk County, Arkansas, U.S.
- Died: November 1, 1985 (aged 75) Mena, Arkansas, U.S.
- Party: Democratic

Roy Lee Riales Sr. (December 24, 1909 – November 1, 1985) was an American politician who served in the Arkansas House of Representatives from 1939 to 1948. He was a member of the Democratic Party.
