= Abraham A. Pennington =

American politician

A. A. Pennington
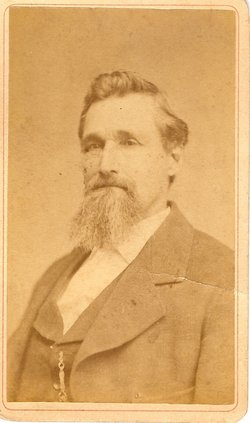
- Pennington in 1874 as Speaker of the Arkansas House of Representatives

Member of the Arkansas House of Representatives
- In office 1859–1861, 1875–1877

Speaker of the Arkansas House of Representatives
- In office 1875–1877
- Preceded by: James H. Berry
- Succeeded by: Dawson L. Kilgore

Member of the Arkansas State Senate
- In office 1877–1881

Personal details
- Born: Abraham Anderson Pennington September 23, 1825 Arkansas, United States
- Died: October 21, 1885 (aged 60) Whelen Springs, Clark County, Arkansas
- Party: Democratic
- Spouse: Elizabeth Tennessee Andrews (1836-1885)
- Occupation: lawyer

Abraham Anderson Pennington (23 September 1825 – 23 October 1885) was an American politician in Arkansas. He was a Democratic Party member of the Arkansas House of Representatives from 1859-1861 and 1875-1877.

He served as Speaker of the Arkansas House of Representatives. He served in the Arkansas Senate from 1877 to 1881. His post office was listed as in Malvern, Arkansas in Hot Spring County.

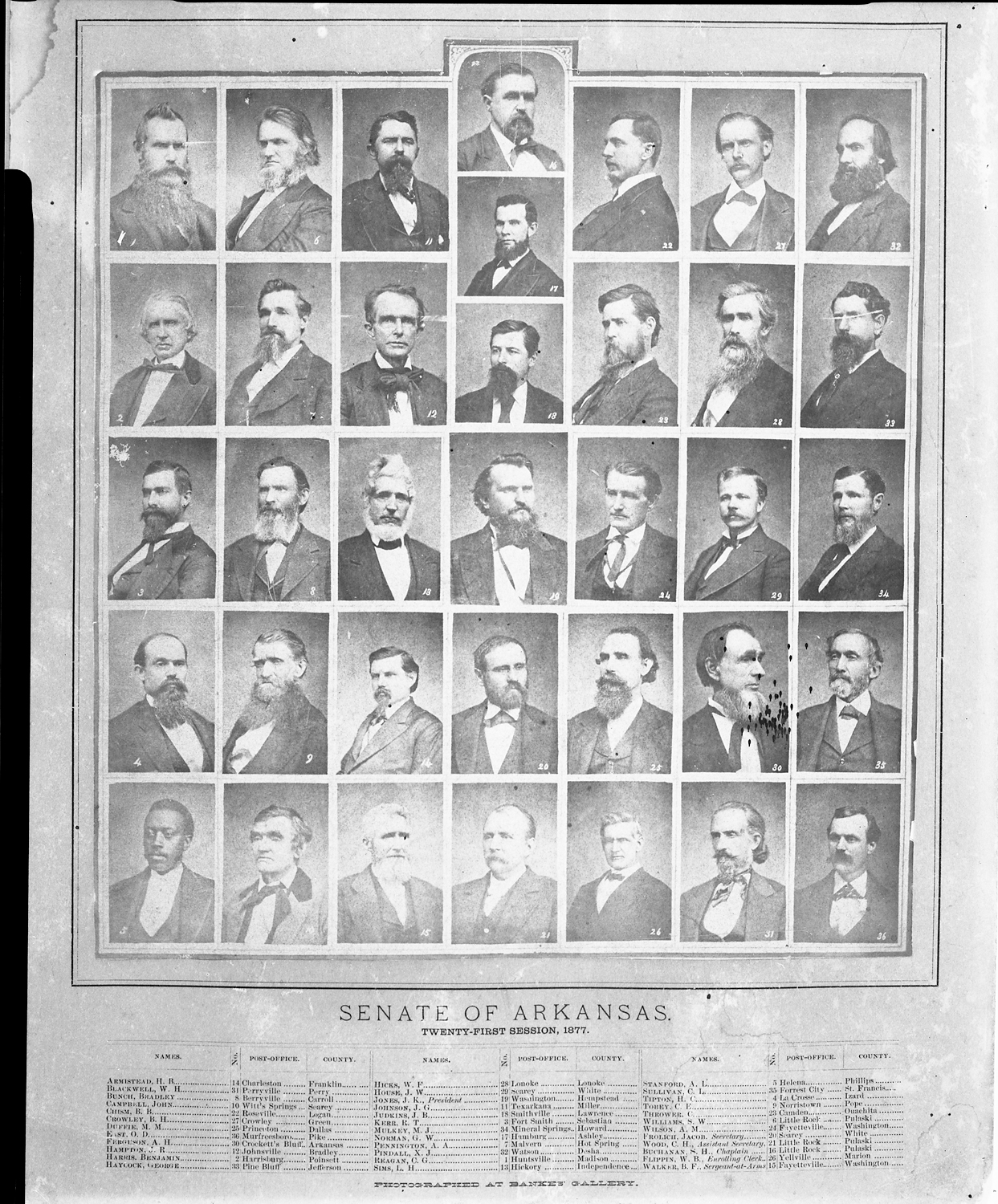
1877 Arkansas Senate composite of photographs
