= Marion H. Crank =

Arkansas businessman, politician, and rural planner

Marion Harland Crank

Arkansas State Representative from Little River and Sevier counties
- In office 1951–1968

Speaker of the Arkansas House of Representatives
- In office 1963–1964
- Preceded by: John P. Bethel
- Succeeded by: J. H. Cottrell, Jr.

Personal details
- Born: February 18, 1915 Bearden, Arkansas, U.S.
- Died: December 18, 1994 (aged 79) Texarkana, Texas, U.S.
- Resting place: Holy Cross Cemetery in Foreman in Little River County, Arkansas
- Party: Democratic
- Spouse(s): Mary Pauline Yauger, or "Polly" Crank (married 1940-1994, his death)
- Children: Marianne C. Maynard Robert A. Crank; Margaret Crank Amps Elisabeth C. Carter
- Occupation: Businessman; Rural planner

Marion Harland Crank (February 18, 1915 – December 19, 1994) was an American Democratic politician from Foreman in Little River County in the U.S. state of Arkansas. He served in the Arkansas House of Representatives from 1951 to 1968. He was the Speaker of the Arkansas House of Representatives from 1963 to 1964 and his party's gubernatorial nominee in 1968, but he was narrowly defeated by the incumbent Republican Winthrop Rockefeller.

== Background ==
Crank was born in Bearden outside Camden in Ouachita County in south Arkansas. He was originally engaged in the mercantile business in Foreman and was particularly active in the St. Barnabas Episcopal Church there. He was the chief of real property control for the Farmers Home Administration regional office in Dallas. He worked to establish the Foreman Industrial Development Corporation. He was sent to China as the chief agricultural officer for the United Nations Relief and Rehabilitation Administration. At the time of his death in Texarkana, Texas, he was the president of Southwest Arkansas Planning & Development District and the chairman of the Little River County Rural Development Authority.

In 1940, Crank married Mary Pauline "Polly" Yauger (1918-2013), a native of Foreman. The couple had a son, Robert A. Crank (born 1945) of Heber Springs in Cleburne County in north Arkansas, and three daughters, Marianne Maynard (born 1943) and Elisabeth Carter (born 1956), both of Stuttgart, Arkansas, and Margaret Crank Amps (born 1949) of Little Rock.

== Political career ==
In 1961, Representative Crank led the successful opposition in the Arkansas House, 59 to 26, to ratification of the Twenty-third Amendment to the United States Constitution, which allows presidential electors to the District of Columbia based on its population as if it were a state. According to Crank, supporters of the amendment, which was approved by the needed thirty-eight states and took effect with the 1964 presidential election really intended "to create another state. Giving them electors is the first step" in that process.

Crank was an ally of Governor Orval Faubus who after twelve years in office did not seek reelection in 1966, when Rockefeller defeated a former Faubus intraparty rival, James D. Johnson of Conway, who resigned his seat on the Arkansas Supreme Court to make the race. Johnson was a staunch segregationist. In 1968, Crank won the Democratic gubernatorial nod in a heated runoff election against Johnson's wife, Virginia Morris Johnson. He received 215,098 votes (63.3%); Johnson, 124,880 ballots (36.7%). Jim Johnson, meanwhile, ran unsuccessfully in the party primary against U.S. Senator J. William Fulbright, who that year won his fifth and final term in the office.

In the general election campaign, Crank accused Rockefeller of fiscal irresponsibility and noted the addition of 1,700 state government employees since January 1967. An eliminated Democratic gubernatorial candidate, attorney Ted Boswell of Bryant produced documentation that several of Crank's family members were on the state payroll during Crank's Speakership. In 1963, the Crank family was paid $6,838 in addition to his annual $1,200 salary for part-time work. His eight-year-old daughter, Elisabeth, was listed as a paid House messenger. Another daughter, 14-year-old Margaret, was on the payroll, as was Crank's 18-year-old son, Robert, a student at the University of Arkansas at Fayetteville, the legislative sergeant-at-arms. In a television address Crank conceded these payments and contrasted his modest personal background with that of his wealthy opponent: "Neither could I afford to send my children to an expensive private school in Switzerland, as Mr. Rockefeller did with his son (later Lieutenant Governor Winthrop Paul Rockefeller)."

Crank questioned why Thomas Murton, Rockefeller's controversial appointee as Arkansas prison superintendent had placed members of the Murton family on the state payroll. He asked why Republican State Representative George E. Nowotny of Fort Smith had his personal secretary on the state payroll. Crank noted that Lieutenant Governor Maurice Britt's brother worked for the Arkansas Department of Revenue. And, a Democrat former legislative colleague, Jerry K. Thomasson of Arkadelphia, who switched parties to run twice for attorney general, had placed his own wife on the state payroll. Prior to the disclosure of the Crank children on the state payroll, a poll had shown Crank leading Rockefeller, three-to-two. And morale in the Rockefeller camp had declined with the organization of a "Republicans-for-Crank" organization, which solicited the support of Henry M. Britt of Hot Springs, the 1960 Republican gubernatorial who had lost every county to Faubus. Britt and former Republican state party chairman William L. Spicer of Fort Smith had formerly quarreled with Rockefeller, but Britt had been reconciled for the 1968 race.

Arkansas voted not for Crank but for Moderate Republican Rockefeller for governor. Rockefeller polled 322,782 votes (52.4%) to Crank's 292,813 (47.6%), but Crank led in forty-six of the seventy-five counties, mostly in south, eastern, and southwestern portions of the state. Fulbright, nationally known for his opposition to the Vietnam War, handily defeated the conservative Republican Charles T. Bernard for the U.S. Senate. George Wallace, nominee of the American Independent Party in the U.S. presidential contest, rather than either of the major party nominees, Richard M. Nixon or Hubert H. Humphrey. Sometimes called the "schizophrenic election", the choices were analyzed by the late political scientist Jim Ranchino of Ouachita Baptist University in Arkadelphia, who attributed the seemingly contradictory results to a streak of political independence found in the state's electorate.

Years after his active political career, Crank in 1991 was a campaign donor to fellow Democrat Bill Clinton, the only Arkansan thus far to become U.S. President.

Crank died in 1994 at the age of seventy-nine at a hospital in Texarkana, Texas. He and his wife are interred at Holy Cross Cemetery in Foreman.

Party political offices
Preceded by Bill Clinton	Democratic nominee for Governor of Arkansas; 1968	Succeeded by Dale Bumpers
Preceded by John P. Bethel	Speaker of the Arkansas House of Representatives from Little River County; 1963–1964	Succeeded by J. H. Cottrell Jr.
