= F. E. Brown =

American politician

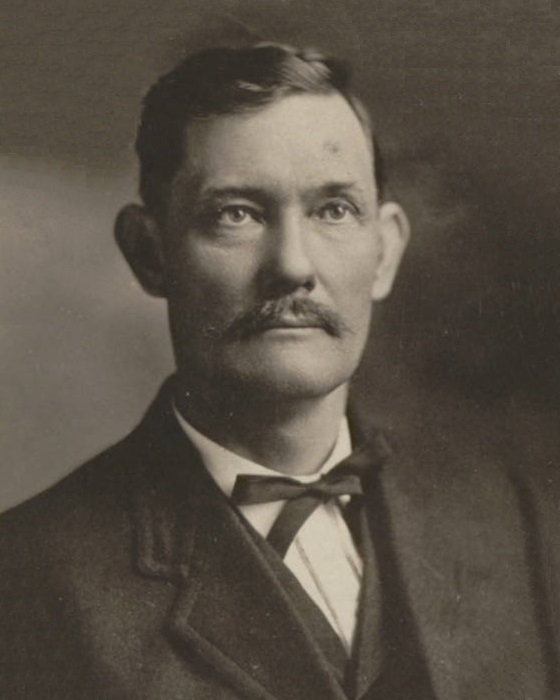
- Official portrait, 1909

37th Speaker of the Arkansas House of Representatives
- In office January 11, 1909 – January 9, 1911
- Preceded by: Allen H. Hamiter
- Succeeded by: R. F. Milwee

Member of the Arkansas House of Representatives from Prairie County
- In office January 11, 1909 – January 9, 1911
- Preceded by: Abel S. Reinhardt
- Succeeded by: Charles B. Thweatt
- In office January 9, 1893 – January 9, 1899
- Preceded by: John R. Johnson
- Succeeded by: Alfred L. Aydelott

Personal details
- Born: Frederick Epps Brown; August 27, 1858 Choctaw County, Mississippi, United States
- Died: July 3, 1928 (aged 69) Des Arc, Arkansas, United States
- Party: Democratic
- Spouse: Addie Morrill (m. 1882; died 1923)
- Occupation: Merchant; lawyer; politician

Frederick Epps Brown (August 27, 1858 – July 3, 1928) was an American politician. He was a member of the Arkansas House of Representatives, serving from 1893 to 1898 and from 1909 to 1911. He was a member of the Democratic Party.
