= John Lipton =

American politician

77th Speaker of the Arkansas House of Representatives
- In office January 14, 1991 – January 11, 1993
- Preceded by: B. G. Hendrix
- Succeeded by: Doc Bryan

Member of the Arkansas House of Representatives
- In office January 13, 1969 – January 11, 1993
- Preceded by: Bill G. Wells
- Succeeded by: Marian Owens
- Constituency: 42nd district (1969‍–‍1973); 60th district (1973‍–‍1983); 90th district (1983‍–‍1993)

Personal details
- Born: John Mitchell Lipton; February 26, 1936 (age 90) Warren, Arkansas, U.S.
- Party: Democratic
- Spouse: JeNelle (m. 1957)
- Education: Arkansas Agricultural and Mechanical College (BBA)
- Occupation: Businessman; politician

John Mitchell Lipton (born February 26, 1936) is an American former politician. He was a member of the Arkansas House of Representatives, serving from 1969 to 1992. He is a member of the Democratic party.

Lipton received a bachelor's degree in business from Arkansas Agricultural and Mechanical College (now the University of Arkansas at Monticello) with a business degree in 1959. He married his wife, JeNelle, on September 27, 1957.
