= Joe A. Thompson =

American politician (1861–1928)

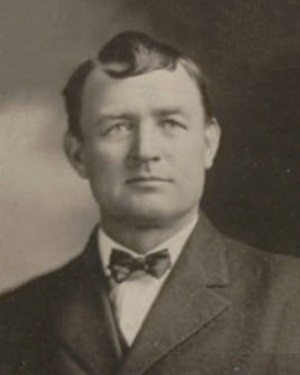
- Official portrait, 1909

Member of the Arkansas House of Representatives from Greene County
- In office January 11, 1909 – January 13, 1913
- Preceded by: James W. Seay
- Succeeded by: Marion F. Dickinson

Personal details
- Born: November 18, 1861; Finch, Arkansas, U.S.
- Died: February 12, 1928 (aged 66); Paragould, Arkansas, U.S.
- Political party: Democratic
- Spouse: Rebecca Wilcockson (m. 1881)
- Children: 7, including J. Ed
- Occupation: Farmer; politician; pastor

Joe Adam Thompson (November 18, 1861 – February 12, 1928) was an American politician, who served in the Arkansas House of Representatives.

Arkansas House of Representatives
Preceded by James W. Seay	Member of the Arkansas House of Representatives; 1909–1913 from Greene County	Succeeded by Marion F. Dickinson
