= Herschel W. Cleveland =

American politician

Member of the Arkansas House of Representatives from the 26th district
- In office 1999–2005

Speaker of the Arkansas House of Representatives
- In office 2003–2005
- Preceded by: Shane Broadway
- Succeeded by: Bill Stovall

Personal details
- Born: April 7, 1946 (age 80) Paris, Arkansas
- Party: Democratic

Herschel W. Cleveland (born April 7, 1946) is an American politician. He was a member of the Arkansas House of Representatives, serving from 1999 to 2005. He is a member of the Democratic party. He is the superintendent of Western Yell School District.

He served as Speaker of the Arkansas House of Representatives.
