= William Thomas Abington House =

Historic house in Arkansas, United States

- U.S. National Register of Historic Places
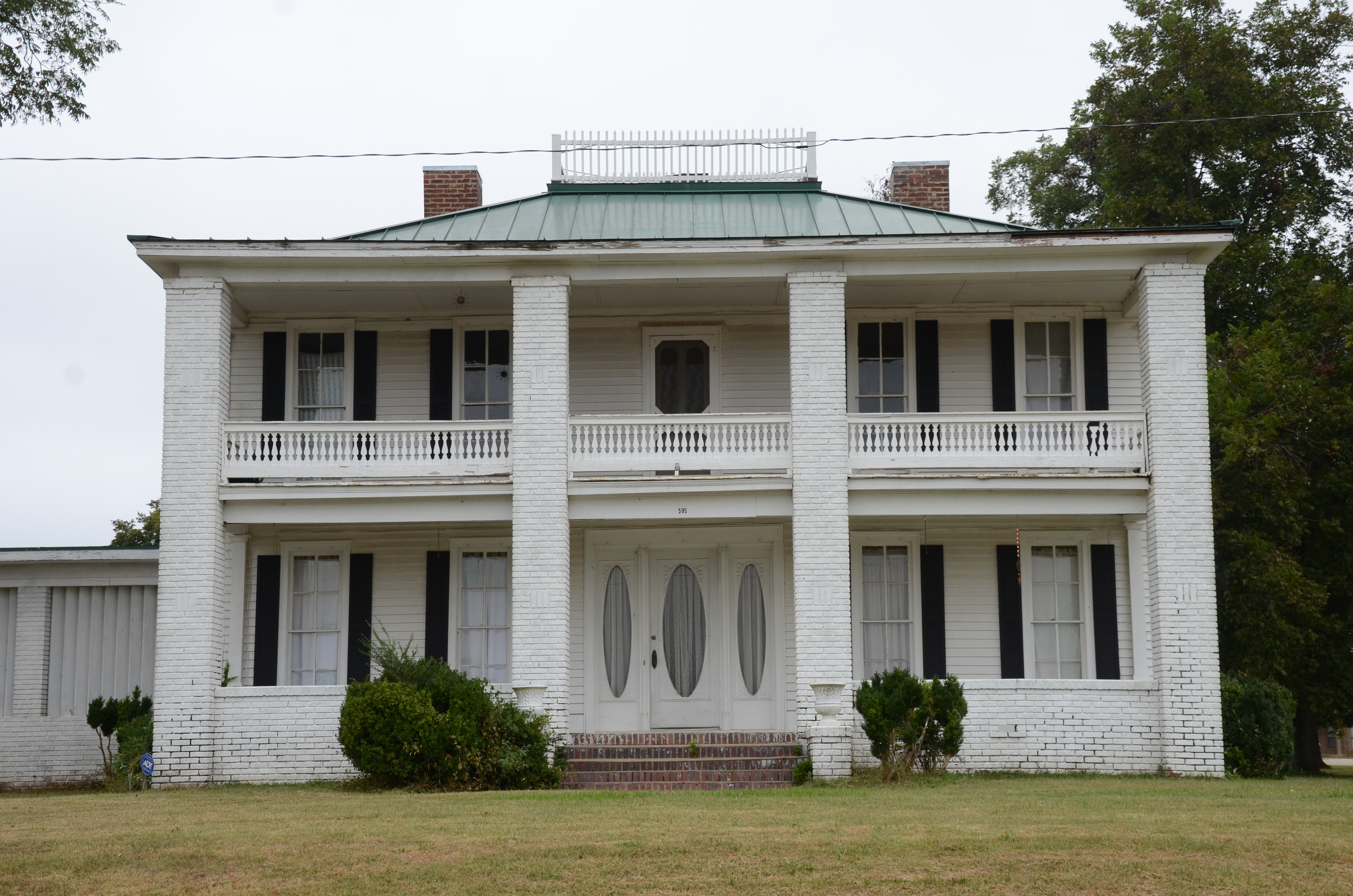

- Location within Arkansas Location within the United States
- Location: Center St, SW of jct. with AR 367, Beebe, Arkansas
- Coordinates: 35°4′28″N 91°52′30″W
- Area: less than one acre
- Built: 1880
- Architect: William Thomas Abington
- Architectural style: Vernacular, Double Pile, Central Hall Plan
- MPS: White County MPS
- NRHP reference No.: 91001350
- Added to NRHP: July 11, 1992

The William Thomas Abington House is a historic house located on Center Street in Beebe, Arkansas, midway between East Mississippi Street and Birch Street.

== Description and history ==
It is a roughly square two-story timber-framed structure, with a hip roof of original metal, and a two-story porch extending across its front facade. Although it is typical of houses built in Beebe in the 1880s, it is one of only a few of the type to survive. It was designed by the first owner, William Thomas Abington, who moved to Beebe with his family in the late 1870s. Abington's son, W. H. Abington, was a prominent local doctor and politician; the Abington Library at Arkansas State University Beebe is named for him.

The house was listed on the National Register of Historic Places on July 11, 1992.

== See also ==
- National Register of Historic Places listings in White County, Arkansas
