= W. K. Ingram =

American politician (1910–1981)

Bill Ingram
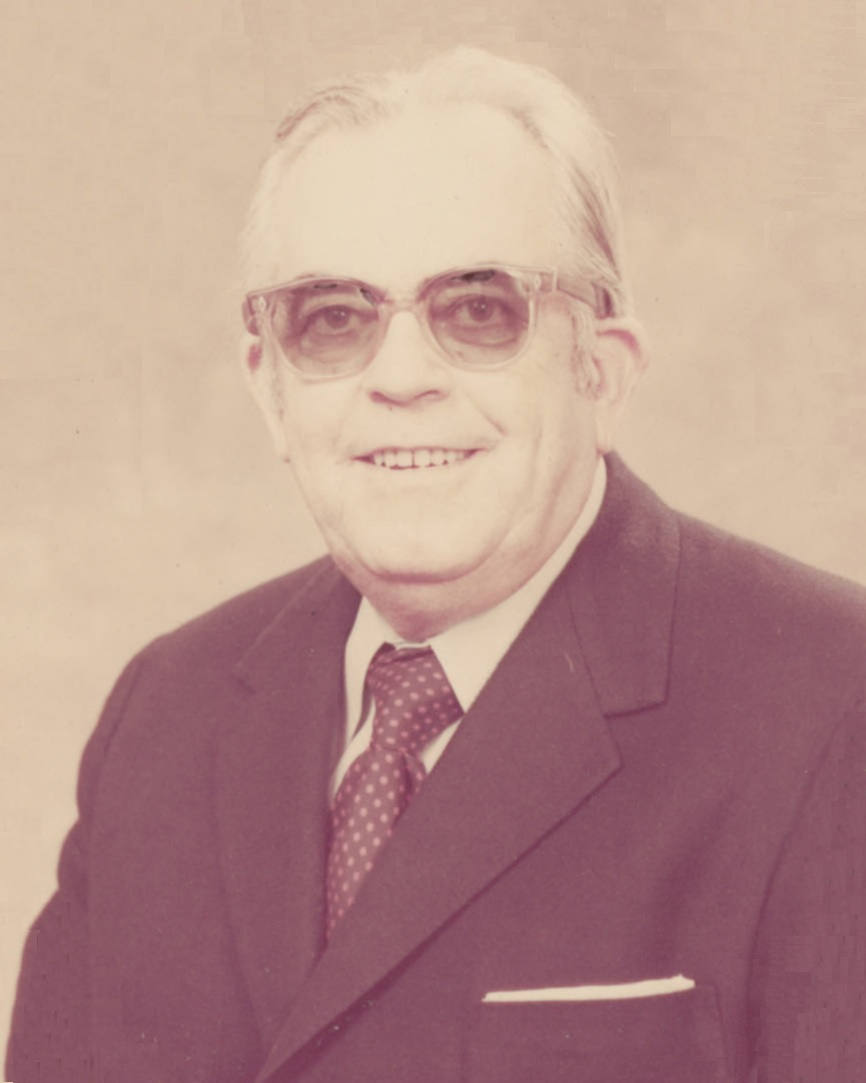
- Official portrait, 1977

Member of the Arkansas Senate
- In office January 14, 1963 – April 17, 1981 Serving with Clarence E. Bell until 1973
- Preceded by: Charles F. Smith
- Succeeded by: Kent Ingram
- Constituency: 25th district (1963–1973); 33rd district (1973–1981)

President pro tempore of the Arkansas Senate
- In office January 10, 1977 – January 8, 1979
- Preceded by: Robert Harvey
- Succeeded by: Knox Nelson

Personal details
- Born: William Kent Ingram; March 15, 1910
- Died: April 17, 1981 (aged 71); Memphis, Tennessee, U.S.
- Political party: Democratic
- Spouse: Magalene McKinnon (m. 1933)

William Kent Ingram (March 15, 1910 – April 17, 1981) was an Arkansas senator from 1963 to 1981. He died in office and was succeeded by his son, W. Kent Ingram.
