= Fred Armstrong (Arkansas politician) =

American politician

Fred Armstrong (January 9, 1903 – December 1938) was an American politician. A member of the Democratic Party, he served in the Arkansas Senate during the 49th Arkansas General Assembly.

== Sources ==
=== Books ===
- Priest, Sharon (1998). Runnells, Jonathan (ed.). Historical Report of the Arkansas Secretary of State. Office of the Arkansas Secretary of State. OCLC 40157815.
