= Benjamin P. Jett =

American officer and state legislator

Dr. Benjamin P. Jett (October 25, 1808 – December 27, 1855) was an American officer and state legislator in Arkansas.

Jett was from Virginia. He married and had numerous children, including a son, Ben, born in 1838. He was an early settler in Washington, Arkansas, where he operated a drugstore. In 1847, he was documented as a Receiver for the Treasury Department.

From November 1, 1852 to January 12, 1853, Jett represented Hempstead County in the Arkansas House of Representatives and served as Speaker of the Arkansas House of Representatives.

In 1996, a Jett family history was published.
