= Charles F. Smith (politician) =

American politician

Member of the Arkansas Senate from the 25th district
- In office January 14, 1957 – August 1, 1962 Serving with Clarence E. Bell
- Preceded by: Lamar Rodgers
- Succeeded by: Bill Ingram

59th Speaker of the Arkansas House of Representatives
- In office January 10, 1955 – January 14, 1957
- Preceded by: Carroll Hollensworth
- Succeeded by: Glenn Walther

Member of the Arkansas House of Representatives from Crittenden County
- In office January 10, 1949 – January 14, 1957
- Succeeded by: Cecil B. Nance Jr.

Personal details
- Born: Charles Franklin Smith Jr. July 6, 1912 Hot Springs, Arkansas, U.S.
- Died: August 1, 1962 (aged 50) Horseshoe Lake, Arkansas, U.S.
- Party: Democratic
- Spouse: Lillian Outzen
- Occupation: Lawyer; politician

Charles Franklin "Rip" Smith Jr. (July 6, 1912 – August 1, 1962) was an American politician. He was a member of the Arkansas House of Representatives from 1949 to 1956. He was a member of the Democratic party. He drowned in a fishing accident in 1962.
