= Buddy Turner =

American politician

68th Speaker of the Arkansas House of Representatives
- In office January 8, 1973 – January 13, 1975
- Preceded by: Ray S. Smith Jr.
- Succeeded by: Cecil L. Alexander

Member of the Arkansas House of Representatives
- In office January 9, 1961 – January 1, 1992
- Preceded by: Knox Nelson
- Succeeded by: Jimmie Don McKissack
- Constituency: Jefferson County (1961–1967); 33rd district (1967–1973); 56th district (1973–1983); 83rd district (1983–1991); 91st district (1991–1992)

Personal details
- Born: Grover White Turner Jr. August 15, 1923 Thornton, Arkansas, U.S.
- Died: August 6, 1998 (aged 74) Hot Springs, Arkansas, U.S.
- Party: Democratic

Military service
- Branch/service: United States Army; Army Air Forces
- Battles/wars: World War II

Grover White "Buddy" Turner Jr. (August 15, 1923 – August 6, 1998) was an American politician. He was a member of the Arkansas House of Representatives, serving from 1961 to 1992. He was a member of the Democratic party.
