= Horace Bull Allis =

American politician (1813–1868)

Horace Bull Allis (1813–1868) served as Speaker of the Arkansas House of Representatives and represented Jefferson County, Arkansas. He was a Unionist Republican.

He was involved in an 1853 Arkansas Supreme Court case.

He sent a letter to U.S. president Abraham Lincoln.

He was one of the preparers of Arkansas' 1864 constitution. He lived in Pine Bluff. He was accused of being a Copperhead while serving as Speaker of the Arkansas House.

He refused to sign William M. Fishback's election certificate.
