= Sterling R. Cockrill =

American politician (1925–2022)

Arkansas State Representative for Pulaski County
- In office January 1, 1957 – December 31, 1970

Speaker of the Arkansas House of Representatives
- In office 1967–1968
- Preceded by: J. H. Cottrell Jr.
- Succeeded by: Hayes McClerkin

Personal details
- Born: April 7, 1925 Little Rock, Arkansas, U.S.
- Died: March 23, 2022 (aged 96) Little Rock, Arkansas, U.S.
- Party: Democratic-turned-Republican (1970)
- Spouse: Adrienne Storey Cockrill
- Relations: Chester Ashley
- Children: Two daughters
- Education: University of Arkansas
- Occupation: Insurance agent, government employee, urban planner artist

Military service
- Branch/service: United States Navy
- Battles/wars: World War II; Korean War

Sterling Robertson Cockrill Jr. (April 7, 1925 – March 23, 2022) was an American politician, civic leader and artist in Little Rock, Arkansas.

== Background ==
Cockrill was a descendant of the 19th century U.S. Senator Chester Ashley, the co-founder of the Rose Law Firm in Little Rock and the namesake of Ashley County in south Arkansas. There are multiple Sterling Robertson Cockrills in Arkansas. One, a native of Nashville, Tennessee, was the youngest chief justice of the Arkansas Supreme Court, who died in 1901 at the age of fifty-three. Chief Justice Cockrill's wife was the granddaughter of Senator Ashley; their son was named Ashley Cockrill.

Cockrill served in the United States Navy during the closing days of World War II and in the Korean War. He received a Bachelor of Business Administration degree from the University of Arkansas at Fayetteville and joined the insurance agency owned by his father in Little Rock. Cockrill and his wife, the former Adrienne Storey, had two daughters.

== Political career ==
Cockrill was elected to the Arkansas House of Representatives as a Democrat in 1956, the same year that Orval Faubus won a second then two-year term as governor of Arkansas. He remained in the state House until December 31, 1970 and was the Speaker for a single term from 1967 to 1968.

In 1968, Speaker Cockrill had criticized Republican Governor Winthrop Rockefeller's proclaimed "Era of Excellence," as having never materialized. In the spring of 1970, however, Cockrill switched affiliation to the Republican Party to run for lieutenant governor on the GOP ticket headed by the two-term Rockefeller, who sought a third-term in office. He explained his party bolt in the pamphlet entitled "The Conscience of an Arkansan". Cockrill criticized the Democratic loyalty oath and accused the Democrats of being willing to "do anything, say anything, tell anything, create anything in order to win." Cockrill won the Republican nomination for lieutenant governor with 88 percent of the vote over the politically unknown Gerald Williams of North Little Rock. Cockrill replaced Lieutenant Governor Maurice Britt on the Republican ticket, who instead served as the Rockefeller campaign manager.

Though they waged vigorous campaigns, Rockefeller and Cockrill were defeated by the united Democratic slate headed by Dale Bumpers and Bob C. Riley. In the Democratic primary, Bumpers triumphed over Faubus and then dislodged Rockefeller with ease. Cockrill lost to Riley, a political science professor at Ouachita Baptist University in Arkadelphia. Riley received 334,379 votes (56.5 percent) to Cockrill's 232,429 (39.3 percent). The remaining 4 percent of the vote was cast for the American Independent Party nominee Hubert Blanton of Hughes in St. Francis County. Cockrill received majorities in Searcy and Washington counties and polled 35,000 more votes than did ticket-mate Rockefeller, as some voters cast split tickets for Bumpers and Cockrill.

Riley attributed his victory to the Democratic "team effort" and accused Cockrill of having engaged in "mudslinging, character assassination, and hate emotions". Riley accused Cockrill supporters of having circulated "vicious statements about me" in African-American neighborhoods. Riley said that he still considered Cockrill a "friend" and hoped that the tactics he found so distasteful had been the work of GOP activists acting without Cockrill's knowledge.

After the 1970 campaign, Cockrill did not again seek public office. From 1971 to 1978, he worked as an urban planner in the Little Rock office of the United States Department of Housing and Urban Development. Cockrill was subsequently the executive director of several organizations dedicated to the revitalization of downtown Little Rock, such as Little Rock Unlimited Progress and the Metrocentre Improvement District.

== Later life ==
After retiring from those positions in 1990, Cockrill became an artist. He created Picasso-like sculptures from oak wood taken from old barns.

Cockrill died on March 23, 2022, at the age of 96.

Preceded by J. H. Cottrell Jr.	Speaker of the Arkansas House of Representatives from Pulaski County; 1967–1968	Succeeded by Hayes McClerkin
