= Robert Harvey (American politician) =

American politician (1914–2001)

Member of the Arkansas House of Representatives
- In office 1947–1957

Member of the Arkansas State Senate
- In office 1957–1979

President pro tempore of the Arkansas Senate
- In office 1975–1975
- Preceded by: Clarence E. Bell
- Succeeded by: W. K. Ingram

Personal details
- Born: May 22, 1914 Swifton, Arkansas, U.S.
- Died: May 19, 2001 (aged 86)
- Education: Vanderbilt University (BA 1937; law degree 1939)
- Occupation: Politician; lawyer; farmer
- Military career
- Allegiance: United States
- Branch: U.S. Army
- Service years: 1942–1945
- Conflicts: World War II

Robert Drennen "Bob" Harvey (May 22, 1914 – May 19, 2001) was an American politician who served as a member of the Arkansas General Assembly for 32 years. He represented Jackson County in the Arkansas House of Representatives for five terms starting in 1947 before being elected to the Arkansas State Senate in 1956, retiring in 1979. He briefly served as president pro tempore of the Arkansas Senate in 1975.

== Early life and education ==
Robert Drennen Harvey was born on May 22, 1914, in Swifton, Arkansas, to William Richard and Lula Belle (née Shaver) Harvey, farmers from Strawberry, Arkansas. His ancestors arrived in the county in 1849. He attended Swifton High School, where he played basketball, before attending a Tennessee military preparatory school.

Harvey graduated with a Bachelor of Arts from Vanderbilt University in 1937, before receiving a law degree from the same school two years later. During his time there, he ran track. After his death, the Robert Harvey Honor Scholarship Fund was established for Vanderbilt students from Arkansas, with preference given to those from Jackson County. Notably, Hallie Shoffner's tuition was paid in full by the scholarship.

== Career ==
Harvey enlisted in the United States Army on October 8, 1942, being discharged May 23, 1945. He served throughout World War II, after which he began his political career, running for, in 1946, the Arkansas House of Representatives, where he served five terms. He was nicknamed the Sage of Swifton.

In 1956, Harvey was elected to the Arkansas State Senate. During his tenure, he advocated for frugal public spending, public libraries and historical preservation. Harvey was involved with the Revenue Stabilization Act. In 1975, Harvey served as president pro tempore of the state Senate. His correspondence papers from 1969 to 1975 are maintained by the Arkansas State Archives. He retired in 1979, returning to his family farm in Swifton.

== Personal life ==
Harvey never married. Bill Clinton biographer Ernest Dumas, writing about Harvey in the Encyclopedia of Arkansas, described him as "soft-spoken".

Harvey died on May 19, 2001, aged 86.

Arkansas Senate
Preceded by Clarence E. Bell	President pro tempore of the Arkansas Senate; 1975	Succeeded by W. K. Ingram
