= Kemp Toney =

American politician

H. Kemp Toney

Member of the Arkansas House of Representatives from the Jefferson County district
- In office January 12, 1931 – January 10, 1949
- Preceded by: Clarance B. Craig
- Succeeded by: Edward W. Brockman Jr

49th Speaker of the Arkansas House of Representatives
- In office January 9, 1933 – January 14, 1935
- Preceded by: Irving C. Neale
- Succeeded by: Harve B. Thorn

Member of the Arkansas Senate from the Eleventh district
- In office January 9, 1905 – January 13, 1913
- Preceded by: Creed Caldwell
- Succeeded by: Thomas C. White

President of the Arkansas Senate
- In office January 12, 1911 – January 13, 1913
- Preceded by: Jesse Martin
- Succeeded by: William K. Oldham

Personal details
- Born: March 2, 1875 near Oxford, Mississippi
- Died: March 9, 1955 (aged 80) White Hall, Arkansas
- Party: Democratic
- Spouse: Florence Musselman (m. 1906; died 1931)
- Children: Elizabeth Toney
- Profession: Lawyer, politician

Hardin Kimbrough "Kemp" Toney (March 2, 1876 – March 9, 1955) was a Democratic politician from Jefferson County, Arkansas. He represented the county in the Arkansas Senate from 1905 to 1913, and the Arkansas House of Representatives from 1931 to 1949.

He served as President of the Senate of the 38th Arkansas General Assembly, and as Speaker of the House of the 49th Arkansas General Assembly.

== Early life ==
Toney was born to William Lunsford Toney and Martha Clarinda (née Kimbrough) near Oxford, Mississippi in 1875. He attended the University of Mississippi. He served as the first president of the Pine Bluff Rotary Club.

== See also ==
- Jeff Davis (Arkansas governor) - Governor of Arkansas while Toney entered politics

Political offices
Preceded by Irving C. Neale	Speaker of the Arkansas House of Representatives; January 9, 1933 – January 14, 1935	Succeeded by Harve B. Thorn
Preceded by Clarance B. Craig	Arkansas House of Representatives; Jefferson County District; January 12, 1931 – January 10, 1949	Succeeded by Edward W. Brockman Jr.
Preceded by Creed Caldwell	Arkansas Senate; Eleventh District; January 9, 1905 – January 13, 1913	Succeeded by Thomas C. White
