= George Thornburgh =

American politician

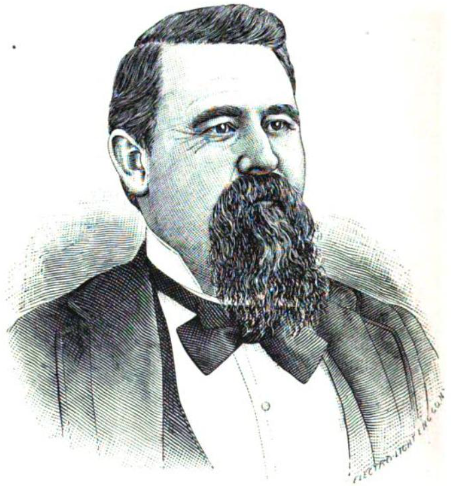

Member of the Arkansas House of Representatives
- In office 1873–1874; 1881–1882; 1885–1886

Speaker of the Arkansas House of Representatives
- In office 1881–1883
- Preceded by: John T. Bearden
- Succeeded by: William Carrick Braly

Personal details
- Born: January 25, 1847 Havana, Illinois
- Died: March 9, 1923 (aged 76) Little Rock, Arkansas
- Party: Democratic

George Thornburgh (January 25, 1847 – March 9, 1923) was an American politician. He was a Democratic member of the Arkansas House of Representatives.
