= Cecil L. Alexander =

American politician (1935–2026)

Cecil Alexander

69th Speaker of the Arkansas House of Representatives

Member of the Arkansas House of Representatives
- In office January 13, 1975 – January 10, 1977
- Preceded by: Buddy Turner
- Succeeded by: James L. Shaver, Jr.

Member of the Arkansas House of Representatives from the Forty-seventh district
- In office January 14, 1963 – January 18, 1979
- Preceded by: Gean P. Houston
- Succeeded by: Pat Ellis

Personal details
- Born: August 2, 1935 Heber Springs, Arkansas, U.S.
- Died: March 5, 2026 (aged 90)
- Party: Democratic
- Spouse: Kathy Alexander (m. 1994)
- Education: Hendrix College
- Profession: Businessman

Cecil Lewis Alexander (August 2, 1935 – March 5, 2026) was an American Democratic politician and lobbyist in Arkansas. He was a member of the Arkansas House of Representatives, serving from 1963 to 1979, including a term as Speaker of the House. Alexander later became a lobbyist followed by a tenure as chair of the Arkansas Racing Commission.

== Early life ==
Alexander was born to Cecil "Slick" Alexander Sr. and Evelyn Alexander in Heber Springs, Arkansas, on August 2, 1935. He graduated from Heber Springs High School before attending Hendrix College, where he played football and studied business. After graduation, Alexander moved back to Heber Springs, where he taught and coached football for three years. He later owned a restaurant until 1971 and part of Heber Springs Realty until 1980.

== Arkansas House of Representatives ==
In the House, Alexander focused on the tourism industry of the Greers Ferry Lake region in the Ozarks. He won his first election in 1963 by four votes to represent Cleburne County and was seated in the 64th Arkansas General Assembly. He was reelected in 1964. The districts were modified in the 1966 elections; Alexander now represented the 14th District, which contained Cleburne, Faulkner, and Van Buren counties alongside J.C. "Bud" Dawson and later A.J. "Arch" Troxell. The districts were modified again for the 69th Arkansas General Assembly, shifting Alexander to represent Cleburne and Van Buren counties alone in the 47th District. Alexander served as the Speaker of the Arkansas House of Representatives in the 70th Arkansas General Assembly, followed by one additional term in the House before retiring.

Alexander unsuccessfully sought to represent Arkansas's 2nd congressional district in 1978, and as Lieutenant Governor of Arkansas in 1980.

== Lobbying and Racing Commission ==
Alexander retired and became a lobbyist, quickly becoming one of the state's most powerful and influential. He began representing Entergy in 1980, who hired him for his relationships with legislators despite no energy experience. He was named top lobbyist in a survey of legislators in 1995 and 1999.

Alexander, who had attended horseraces at Oaklawn Park in Hot Springs, Arkansas in 1965, owned a racehorse in the 1980s. Appointed to the Arkansas Racing Commission by Jim Guy Tucker in 1993, he was later re-appointed by Mike Huckabee and Mike Beebe.

== Death ==
Alexander died on March 5, 2026, at the age of 90.
