= James R. Campbell (Arkansas politician) =

American politician

Member of the Arkansas House of Representatives
- In office January 14, 1935 – January 10, 1955
- Succeeded by: Ray S. Smith Jr.
- Constituency: Garland County
- In office January 14, 1929 – January 9, 1933
- Preceded by: W. M. Cannon
- Succeeded by: Minor W. Millwee
- Constituency: Sevier County

57th Speaker of the Arkansas House of Representatives
- In office January 8, 1951 – January 12, 1953
- Preceded by: Carl Hendrix
- Succeeded by: Carroll Hollensworth

Personal details
- Born: James Reid Campbell Jr. December 4, 1893 Tuskegee, Alabama, U.S.
- Died: November 1981 (aged 87) Hot Springs, Arkansas, U.S.
- Party: Democratic

James Reid Campbell Jr. (December 4, 1893 – November 1981) was an American politician. He was a member of the Arkansas House of Representatives, serving from 1929 to 1932 and from 1935 to 1954. He was a member of the Democratic Party.
