= Ernest Cunningham =

American politician (1936–2024)

Member of the Arkansas House of Representatives
- In office 1969–1998

Speaker of the Arkansas House of Representatives
- In office 1987–1989
- Preceded by: Lacy Landers
- Succeeded by: B. G. Hendrix

Personal details
- Born: July 4, 1936 Helena, Arkansas, U.S.
- Died: June 11, 2024 (aged 87) Little Rock, Arkansas, U.S.
- Party: Democratic

Ernest G. Cunningham (July 4, 1936 – June 11, 2024) was an American politician. He was a member of the Arkansas House of Representatives, serving from 1969 to 1998. He was a member of the Democratic Party.

Cunningham was also the owner of a Gulf Oil Corporation distributorship in Helena. died on June 11, 2024, at the age of 87.
