= Glenn Walther =

American politician

Glenn F. Walther

Member of the Arkansas House of Representatives
- In office 1947–1966

Speaker of the Arkansas House of Representatives
- In office 1957–1959
- Preceded by: Charles F. Smith
- Succeeded by: E. C. Fleeman

Personal details
- Born: August 15, 1908 Little Rock, Arkansas, U.S.
- Died: March 28, 1997 (aged 88) Arkansas, U.S.
- Party: Democratic
- Profession: lawyer

Glenn F. Walther (August 15, 1908 – March 28, 1997) was an American politician. He was a member of the Arkansas House of Representatives, serving from 1947 to 1966. He was a member of the Democratic party.
