= Lacy Landers =

American politician

H. Lacy Landers

Member of the Arkansas House of Representatives
- In office 1963–1994

Speaker of the Arkansas House of Representatives
- In office 1985–1987
- Preceded by: John Paul Capps
- Succeeded by: Ernest Cunningham

Personal details
- Born: June 28, 1927 Benton, Arkansas
- Died: August 20, 2011 (aged 84) Bryant, Arkansas
- Party: Democratic

Harold Lacy Landers (June 28, 1927 – August 20, 2011) was an American politician. He was a member of the Arkansas House of Representatives, serving from 1963 to 1994. He was a member of the Democratic Party.

In 1987 he hosted the Southern Legislative Conference in Little Rock, Arkansas. A 2012 House Resolution commemorated him.
