= C. P. Newton =

American politician

Member of the Arkansas House of Representatives
- In office 1909–1914; 1919–1920

Speaker of the Arkansas House of Representatives
- In office 1919–1920
- Preceded by: Lee Cazort
- Succeeded by: Joe Joiner

Personal details
- Born: Clarence Price Newton; July 31, 1879 Pettus Township, Lonoke County, Arkansas
- Died: December 4, 1958 (aged 79) Little Rock, Arkansas
- Party: Democratic

Clarence Price Newton (July 31, 1879 – December 4, 1958) was an American politician. He was a member of the Arkansas House of Representatives, serving from 1919 to 1925. He was a member of the Democratic party.
