= R. F. Milwee =

American politician

Member of the Arkansas House of Representatives
- In office 1911–1912

Speaker of the Arkansas House of Representatives
- In office 1911–1912
- Preceded by: F. E. Brown
- Succeeded by: Joe Hardage

Personal details
- Born: March 16, 1872 Monroe County, Arkansas
- Died: January 29, 1955 (aged 82) Arkansas, United States
- Party: Democratic

Rufus Frank Milwee (March 16, 1872 – January 29, 1955) was an American politician. He was a member of the Arkansas House of Representatives, serving from 1919 to 1925. He was a member of the Democratic party.
