= John M. Bransford =

American politician

Member of the Arkansas House of Representatives from the Lonoke County district
- In office January 12, 1931 – January 14, 1935
- In office January 11, 1937 – January 13, 1941
- Preceded by: W.E. Fletcher

Speaker of the Arkansas House of Representatives
- In office January 11, 1937 – January 13, 1941
- Preceded by: Harve B. Thorn
- Succeeded by: Means Wilkinson

Personal details
- Born: John McKinnis Bransford; November 29, 1901 Lonoke, Arkansas, U.S.
- Died: September 10, 1967 (aged 65) Little Rock, Arkansas, U.S.
- Party: Democratic

John McKinnis Bransford (November 29, 1901 – September 10, 1967) was an American politician. He was a member of the Arkansas House of Representatives, serving from 1931 to 1935, and 1937 to 1941. He was a member of the Democratic Party.

== Government ==
Bransford won election to the Arkansas House of Representatives in 1930, representing one of Lonoke County's two seats in the chamber alongside W.B. Graham. He was a member of the 48th General Assembly, and upon reelection in 1932, served in the 49th General Assembly, representing Lonoke County alongside A.J. Walls. Bransford did not return for the following term, when Lonoke County sent two different politicians to the House.

Upon winning election 1936, Bransford returned to Little Rock for the 51st General Assembly, representing Lonoke County, this time alongside Joe Foster. Bransford was elected Speaker of the Arkansas House of Representatives by his peers. Following reelection, Bransford returned to the House, remaining as speaker, for the 52nd General Assembly.
