= W. C. Braly =

American politician (1841–1920)

Member of the Arkansas House of Representatives
- In office 1877–1880; 1883–1885

Speaker of the Arkansas House of Representatives
- In office 1883–1885
- Preceded by: George Thornburgh
- Succeeded by: James Philip Eagle

Personal details
- Born: William Carrick Braly; November 15, 1841 Franklin County, Missouri
- Died: December 25, 1920 (aged 79) Lincoln, Arkansas
- Party: Democratic

William Carrick Braly (November 15, 1841 – December 25, 1920) was an American politician. He was a member of the Arkansas House of Representatives, serving from 1877 to 1880 and from 1883 to 1885. He was a member of the Democratic Party.
