= Thomas A. Hill =

American politician

Member of the Arkansas House of Representatives
- In office 1919–1927

Speaker of the Arkansas House of Representatives
- In office 1925–1927
- Preceded by: Howard Reed
- Succeeded by: Reece Caudle

Personal details
- Born: Thomas Austin Hill; June 24, 1889 Pine Bluff, Arkansas
- Died: June 25, 1937 (aged 48) Pine Bluff, Arkansas
- Party: Democratic

Thomas Austin Hill (July 24, 1889 – June 25, 1937) was an American politician. He was a member of the Arkansas House of Representatives, serving from 1919 to 1927. He was a member of the Democratic Party.
