= Jenny Lind, Arkansas =

Unincorporated community in Arkansas, U.S.

Coordinates: 35.25037°N 94.31855°W

Jenny Lind is an unincorporated community in Sebastian County, in the U.S. state of Arkansas.

== History ==
A post office called Jenny Lind was established in 1851, and remained in operation until it was discontinued in 1959. The community was named for Jenny Lind, a Swedish opera singer.

The area was inhabited by the Osage and Quapaw tribes in the first quarter of the 19th century, and white settlement began in the 1840s. Due to destruction of records, the history of the community between 1851 and 1882 is obscure. Coal was discovered in the area in the 1880s, and a mining community known as New Jenny Lind was established adjacent to the former settlement, which became known as Old Jenny Lind (also known as Altus and Old Town). Eventually the name of New Jenny Lind became shortened to just Jenny Lind. The mines, upon which the local economy was dependent, closed in the 1950s. The community's school, which had operated since 1851, was merged into the Greenwood district in the 1940s.
