= Hollywood Cemetery (Hot Springs, Arkansas) =

Historic cemetery in Arkansas, United States

- Hollywood Cemetery, Confederate Section
- U.S. National Register of Historic Places
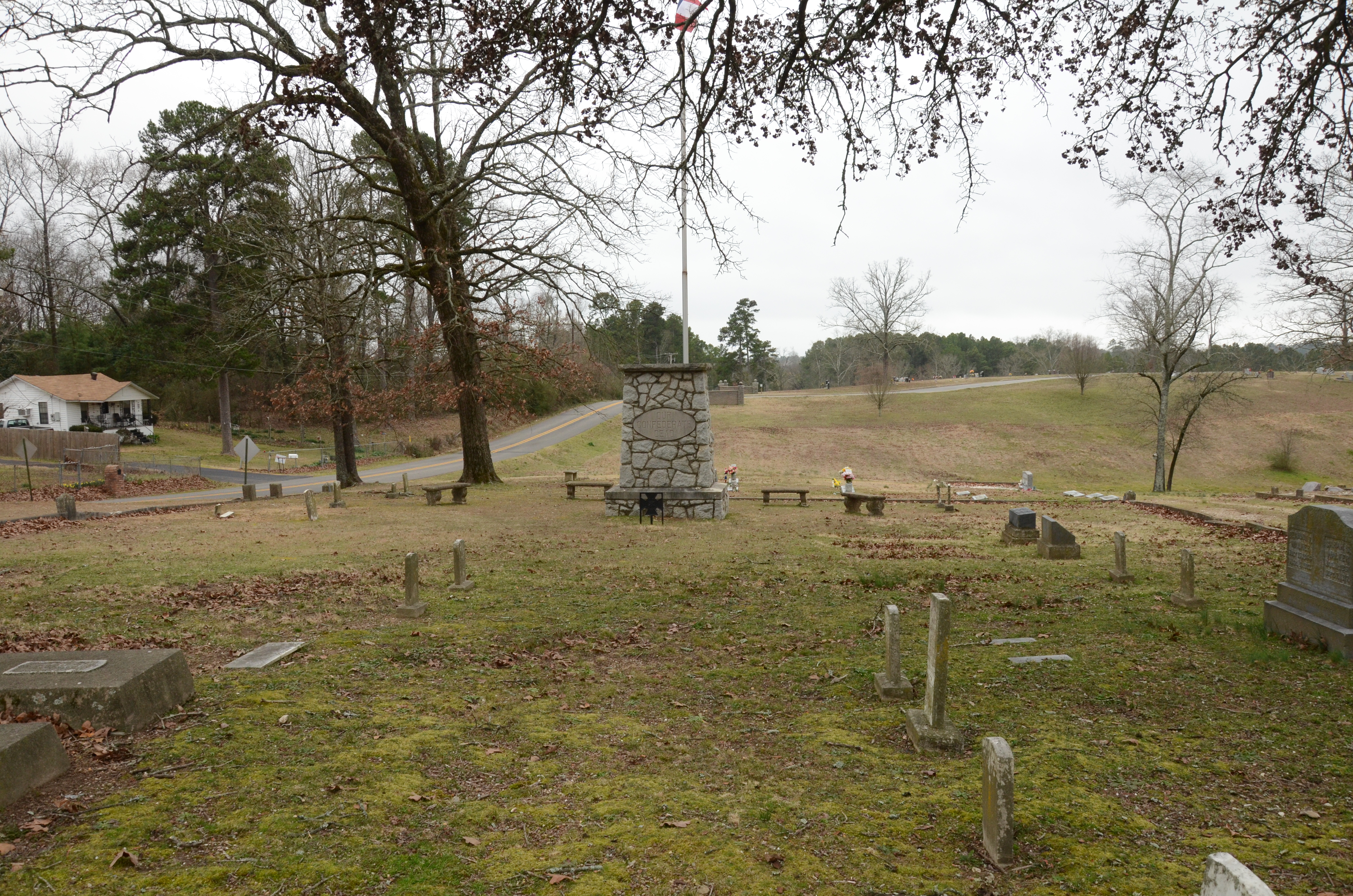

- Location within Arkansas Location within the United States
- Location: Near Jct. of Hollywood Ave. and Mote Rd., Hot Springs, Arkansas
- Coordinates: 34°29′11″N 93°2′33″W
- Area: less than one acre
- Built: 1919
- Architectural style: Rustic
- MPS: Civil War Commemorative Sculpture MPS
- NRHP reference No.: 96001409
- Added to NRHP: December 6, 1996

The Hollywood Cemetery is the oldest cemetery in Hot Springs, Arkansas. The cemetery was established sometime prior to the American Civil War, with its oldest marked grave dating to 1856. It is located southeast of downtown Hot Springs, and is bounded by Hollywood Avenue, Mote Street, and Shady Grove Road. Its Confederate Section, located in the northeastern part of the cemetery, commemorates the city's Civil War Confederate Army soldiers, and contains 34 marked burials. At the center of that area is an 8-foot (2.4 m) granite monument in which is a marble marker inscribed "OUR CONFEDERATE DEAD". The Confederate section of the cemetery was listed on the National Register of Historic Places in 1996.

The cemetery has two notable burials – Indian Wars Medal of Honor recipient Christian Steiner (1843–1880) and US Congressman Lewis E. Sawyer (1867–1923).

== See also ==
- National Register of Historic Places listings in Garland County, Arkansas
