= Benny Petrus =

American politician (1956–2024)

Member of the Arkansas House of Representatives from the 14th district
- In office 2007–2012

Speaker of the Arkansas House of Representatives
- In office 2007–2009
- Preceded by: Bill Stovall
- Succeeded by: Robbie Wills

Personal details
- Born: November 23, 1956
- Died: May 17, 2024 (aged 67) Little Rock, Arkansas, U.S.
- Party: Democratic
- Profession: Farmer and car dealer

Benny C. Petrus (November 23, 1956 – May 17, 2024) was an American politician. He was a member of the Arkansas House of Representatives, serving from 2002 to 2008. He was a member of the Democratic Party. Petrus died in Little Rock, Arkansas, on May 17, 2024, at age 67.
