= Joe Joiner =

American politician

Member of the Arkansas House of Representatives
- In office 1915–1916; 1919–1922

Speaker of the Arkansas House of Representatives
- In office 1920–1921
- Preceded by: C. P. Newton
- Succeeded by: Howard Reed

Personal details
- Born: Joseph William Joiner; August 1, 1888 Magnolia, Arkansas, U.S.
- Died: June 2, 1932 (aged 43) El Dorado, Arkansas, U.S.
- Party: Democratic

Joseph William Joiner (August 1, 1888 – June 2, 1932) was an American politician. He was a member of the Arkansas House of Representatives, serving from 1919 to 1925. He was a member of the Democratic Party.
