= B. B. Hudgins =

American politician

Member of the Arkansas House of Representatives
- In office 1885–1891

Speaker of the Arkansas House of Representatives
- In office 1889–1891
- Preceded by: John Marshall Hewitt
- Succeeded by: Elias W. Rector

Personal details
- Born: August 15, 1854 Taney County, Missouri
- Died: December 1, 1923 (aged 69) Boone County, Arkansas
- Party: Democratic

Brice Benjamin Hudgins (August 15, 1854 – December 1, 1923) was an American politician. He was a member of the Arkansas House of Representatives, serving from 1887 to 1893, and was Speaker of the House in his last term. He was a member of the Democratic party.

He served as a circuit court judge from 1890 to 1898 and from 1908 to 1912. He was also chairman of the Arkansas Railroad Commission from 1903 to 1907.

B. B. Hudgins died in December 1923.
