= Alvin Simes =

Lawyer and state legislator in Arkansas

Alvin Leonard Simes is a lawyer who served in the Arkansas Senate from 2001 to 2002. During his time in the senate, he co-sponsored the bill that created the Mosaic Templars Cultural Center.

He received a BS from Arkansas State University and a JD from the University of Arkansas. He works in Forrest City. Judge L. T. Simes was his brother.
