= J. H. Cottrell Jr. =

American politician

Member of the Arkansas House of Representatives
- In office 1955–1967

Speaker of the Arkansas House of Representatives
- In office 1965–1967
- Preceded by: Marion H. Crank
- Succeeded by: Sterling R. Cockrill

Personal details
- Born: John Hall Cottrell Jr. November 15, 1917 Shirley, Arkansas
- Died: December 14, 2000 (aged 83) Little Rock, Arkansas
- Party: Democratic
- Profession: lawyer

John Hall Cottrell Jr. (November 15, 1917 – December 14, 2000) was an American politician. He was a member of the Arkansas House of Representatives, serving from 1955 to 1966. He was a member of the Democratic party.
