= William U. McCabe =

American politician

William McCabe

Member of the Arkansas House of Representatives from the Baxter County district
- In office January 12, 1931 – May 6, 1931
- Preceded by: Kent K. Jackson
- Succeeded by: M. R. Pryor

Member of the Arkansas Senate from the Twenty-third district
- In office January 10, 1921 – January 12, 1924
- Preceded by: Elbert E. Godwin
- Succeeded by: H.A. Northcutt

Personal details
- Born: 1880
- Died: May 6, 1931 (aged 51) Little Rock, Arkansas
- Party: Democratic
- Children: 7

William U. McCabe (1880 – May 5, 1931) was an attorney and politician from Mountain Home, Arkansas. He served in the Arkansas Senate from 1921 to 1924, and the Arkansas House of Representatives from January 1931 until his assassination on May 6, 1931. McCabe worked to reform the Arkansas Constitution and state highway funding system during a period of good government reforms in the state.

== Career ==
McCabe entered government by serving in the 1918 constitutional convention to replace the 1874 Arkansas Constitution. The proposed constitution included women's suffrage, but was not ratified.

Throughout his political career, McCabe fought to increase highway funding for small, rural counties like Baxter County. He introduced bills in 1924 and 1931.

=== House of Representatives ===
During the 48th Arkansas General Assembly, McCabe authored a bill proposing a constitutional convention to reorganize the state government. Proposed during the peak of the good government movement, McCabe's bill echoed many of the retrenchments proposed by Governor Harvey Parnell.

== Death ==
McCabe was shot in his hotel room early in the morning of March 12, 1931. With a bullet embedded in his heart, McCabe recovered sufficiently to return to Mountain Home, but succumbed to pneumonia at a Little Rock hospital on May 6, 1931. Another hotel guest, H.G. Lansdale, a traveling salesman from Atlanta, Georgia, was charged with murder after a pistol was found in his room. The two men had both complained to a hotel clerk about noise. Lansdale was later acquitted by a jury on June 20.

Political offices
Preceded by Kent K. Jackson	Arkansas House of Representatives; Baxter County; January 12, 1931–May 6, 1931	Succeeded by M. R. Pryor
Preceded by Elbert E. Godwin	Arkansas Senate; District 23; January 10, 1931– January 12, 1933	Succeeded by H.A. Northcutt
