= R. W. Griffith =

American politician

Member of the Arkansas House of Representatives
- In office 1939–1946

Speaker of the Arkansas House of Representatives
- In office 1943–1945
- Preceded by: Means Wilkinson
- Succeeded by: Horace Northcutt

Personal details
- Born: October 7, 1906 North Little Rock, Arkansas
- Died: October 21, 1960 (aged 54) Little Rock, Arkansas
- Party: Democratic

Robert William Griffith (October 7, 1906 – October 21, 1960) was an American politician. He was a member of the Arkansas House of Representatives, serving from 1939 to 1946. He was a member of the Democratic party.
