= Mack Thompson =

American politician (1922–2003)

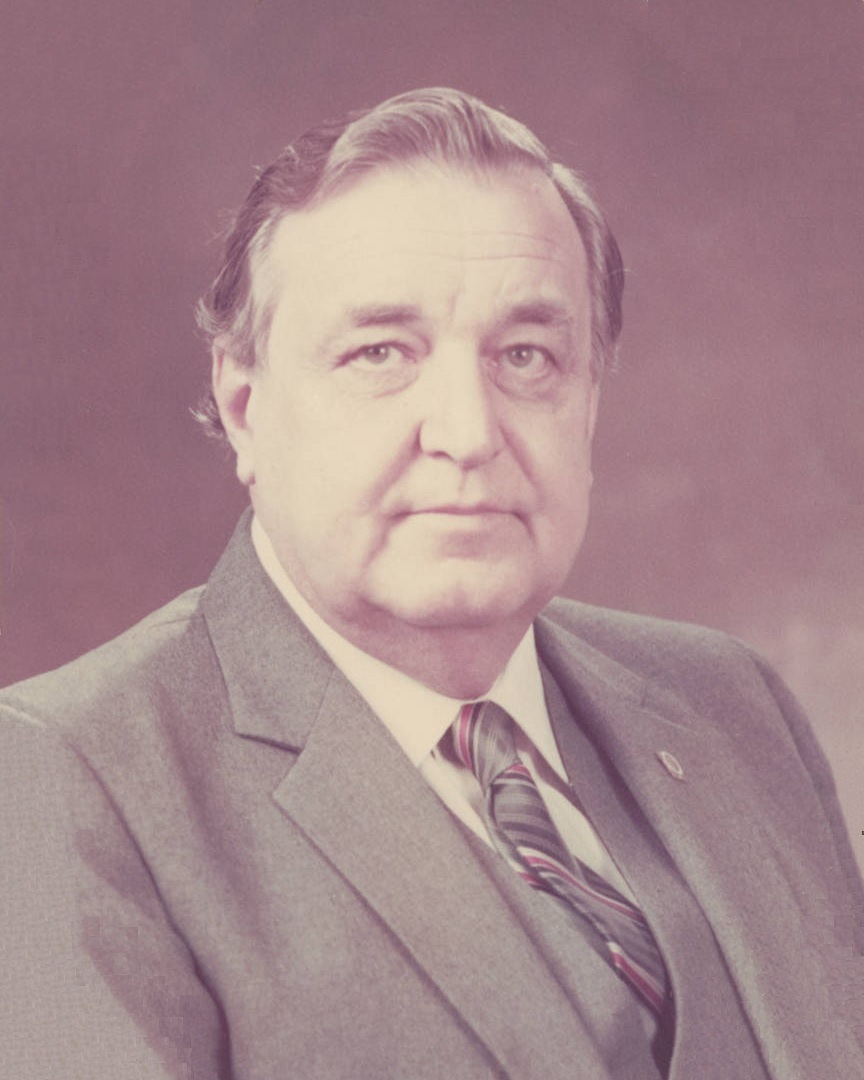
- Official portrait, 1981

Member of the Arkansas House of Representatives
- In office January 8, 1973 – January 12, 1987
- Preceded by: Andrew Schug
- Succeeded by: Mike Todd
- Constituency: 66th district (1973–1983); 20th district (1983–1987)

Personal details
- Born: Mack Autry Thompson; December 16, 1922; Finch, Arkansas, U.S.
- Died: December 16, 2003 (aged 81); Paragould, Arkansas, U.S.
- Political party: Democratic
- Spouse: Allean Lively (m. 1951)
- Children: 2
- Parent: J. Ed Thompson (father)
- Occupation: Business manager; police officer; politician

Military service
- Branch/service: United States Army
- Battles/wars: World War II

Mack Autry Thompson (December 16, 1922 – December 16, 2003) was an American politician, who served in the Arkansas House of Representatives.

Thompson married the former Allean Lively on January 13, 1951. Together they had two sons.

Arkansas House of Representatives
Preceded by Andrew Schug	Member of the Arkansas House of Representatives; 1973–1987 from the 66th district (part of Greene County), 1973–1983 from the 20th district (part of Greene County), 1983–1987	Succeeded by Mike Todd
