= Howard Reed =

American politician (1883-1942)

Member of the Arkansas House of Representatives
- In office 1919–1925

Speaker of the Arkansas House of Representatives
- In office 1921–1925
- Preceded by: Joe Joiner
- Succeeded by: Thomas A. Hill

Personal details
- Born: Howard William Reed; September 29, 1883 Mankato, Kansas
- Died: November 24, 1942 (aged 59) Little Rock, Arkansas
- Party: Democratic

Howard William Reed (September 29, 1883 – November 24, 1942) was an American politician. He was a member of the Arkansas House of Representatives, serving from 1919 to 1925. He was a member of the Democratic Party.
