= Allen Hamiter =

American politician

Allen H. Hamiter

Member of the Arkansas House of Representatives
- In office 1905–1909

Speaker of the Arkansas House of Representatives
- In office 1907–1909
- Preceded by: William W. Cate
- Succeeded by: F. E. Brown

Personal details
- Born: November 27, 1867 Walnut Hill, Lafayette County, Arkansas
- Died: February 9, 1933 (aged 65) Arkansas, United States
- Party: Democratic

Allen H. Hamiter (November 27, 1867 – February 9, 1933) was an American politician. He was a member of the Arkansas House of Representatives, serving from 1905 to 1909. He was a member of the Democratic Party.
