= John P. Bethell =

American politician

Member of the Arkansas House of Representatives
- In office 1949–1972

Speaker of the Arkansas House of Representatives
- In office 1961–1963
- Preceded by: E. C. Fleeman
- Succeeded by: Marion H. Crank

Personal details
- Born: July 4, 1907 Columbia, Tennessee
- Died: January 2, 1981 (aged 73) Des Arc, Arkansas
- Party: Democratic
- Profession: teacher and coach

John Pinckney Bethell, Sr. (July 4, 1907 – January 2, 1981) was an American politician. He was a member of the Arkansas House of Representatives, serving from 1949 to 1972. He was a member of the Democratic party.
