= John Paul Capps =

American politician (born 1934)

Member of the Arkansas Senate from the 29th district
- In office January 13, 2003 – January 10, 2011
- Preceded by: Mike Beebe
- Succeeded by: Jonathan Dismang

Member of the Arkansas House of Representatives
- In office January 14, 1963 – January 11, 1999
- Succeeded by: Russ Hunt
- Constituency: White County (1963–1967); 23rd district (1967–1973); 49th district (1973–1983); 44th district (1983–1993); 68th district (1993–1999)

73rd Speaker of the Arkansas House of Representatives
- In office January 10, 1983 – January 14, 1985
- Preceded by: Lloyd McCuiston
- Succeeded by: Lacy Landers

Personal details
- Born: April 17, 1934 (age 92) Steprock, Arkansas, U.S.
- Party: Democratic

John Paul Capps (born April 17, 1934) is one of the longest-serving members of the state legislature in Arkansas.

Capps began his career in the late 1950s as a news anchor for KTHV, the CBS affiliate in Little Rock, Arkansas. He then moved to radio, working as a news announcer, DJ, and station manager at KWCB in Searcy, Arkansas. He later started his own radio stations, KAPZ and KKSY.

In November 1962, Capps was elected to the Arkansas House of Representatives as a Democrat at the age of 28, making him one of the youngest representatives at that time. In 1982, he was elected Speaker of the House. In 1998, after 36 years of legislative service, he left the House due to term limits, which had recently been enacted by Arkansas voters.

In 2002, Capps re-entered politics, running for the Arkansas State Senate, District 29 (parts of White, Pulaski, and Faulkner counties) and was elected, subsequently winning re-election in 2006. While in the legislature, he served on a number of committees, including the Legislative Council; Rules and Regulations; Joint Audit; and Revenue and Taxation. He also chaired several committees: Transportation, Technology, and Legislative Affairs; Advanced Communications and Information Technology; Economic and Taxation Policy; and the Blue Ribbon Committee on Highway Finance. Capps worked on a number of initiatives, including a reform of the General Improvement Fund, which had previously encouraged legislators to treat the fund as a pork barrel.

In 2005, the Arkansas Sierra Club called Capps a "hero for Arkansas' future" because his environmental voting record was adjudged the best in the Senate. In 2007, Capps sponsored legislation to create a non-profit organization, Connect Arkansas, intended to expand the state's broadband coverage for health, education, and other economic development projects. As in 1998, he left the legislature in 2010 due to term limits; after his retirement, Capps said that he believed one of his most important achievements was sponsoring legislation to fund the expansion of the University of Arkansas Medical Sciences into a world-class medical center.
