= Reece Caudle =

American politician

Member of the Arkansas House of Representatives
- In office 1923–1928

Speaker of the Arkansas House of Representatives
- In office 1927–1929
- Preceded by: Thomas A. Hill
- Succeeded by: W. H. Abington

Personal details
- Born: June 16, 1888 Scottsville, Arkansas
- Died: June 21, 1955 (aged 67) Pope County, Arkansas
- Party: Democratic

Reece A. Caudle (June 16, 1888 – June 21, 1955) was an American politician. He was a member of the Arkansas House of Representatives, serving from 1923 to 1928. He was a member of the Democratic Party.
