= John Marshall Hewitt =

American politician

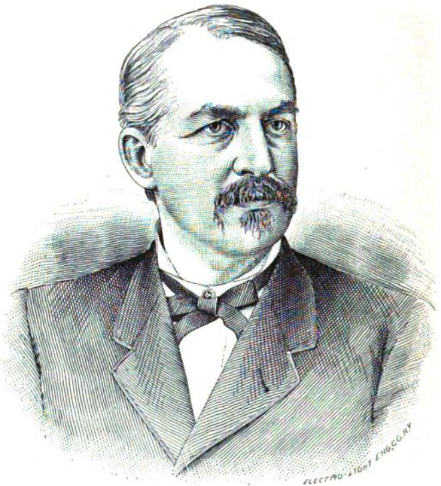
- Hewitt c. 1887

Member of the Arkansas House of Representatives
- In office 1881–1889

Speaker of the Arkansas House of Representatives
- In office 1887–1889
- Preceded by: James Philip Eagle
- Succeeded by: B. B. Hudgins

Personal details
- Born: July 22, 1841 Frankfort, Kentucky
- Died: February 29, 1888 (aged 46) Marianna, Arkansas
- Party: Democratic

John Marshall Hewitt (July 22, 1841 – February 29, 1888) was an American politician. He was a member of the Arkansas House of Representatives, serving from 1881 to 1889. He was a member of the Democratic party. He died of cancer.
