= Bill Stovall =

American politician

Member of the Arkansas House of Representatives from the 42nd district
- In office 2001–2007

Speaker of the Arkansas House of Representatives
- In office 2005–2007
- Preceded by: Herschel W. Cleveland
- Succeeded by: Benny Petrus

Personal details
- Born: February 21, 1960 (age 66) Blytheville, Arkansas
- Party: Democratic

William Harry Stovall III (born February 21, 1960) is an American politician. He was a member of the Arkansas House of Representatives, serving from 2001 to 2007. He is a member of the Democratic party.
