= Horace Northcutt =

American politician

Member of the Arkansas House of Representatives
- In office 1933–1936; 1941–1946

Speaker of the Arkansas House of Representatives
- In office 1945–1947
- Preceded by: R. W. Griffith
- Succeeded by: Roy L. Riales, Sr.

Member of the Arkansas State Senate
- In office 1925–1928; 1937–1938

Personal details
- Born: February 16, 1883 Salem, Arkansas
- Died: March 23, 1950 (aged 67) Little Rock, Arkansas
- Party: Democratic

Horace Allen Northcutt (February 16, 1883 – March 23, 1950) was an American politician. He was a member of the Arkansas House of Representatives, serving from 1933 to 1936 and from 1941 to 1946. He was a member of the Democratic party. Northcutt also served as a State Senator. He served as Speaker of the Arkansas House of Representatives in 1945.
