= Carl Hendrix =

American politician

Member of the Arkansas House of Representatives
- In office 1945–1950

Speaker of the Arkansas House of Representatives
- In office 1949–1950
- Preceded by: Roy L. Riales, Sr.
- Succeeded by: James R. Campbell

Personal details
- Born: Carl Edward Hendrix; August 8, 1906 Sevier County, Arkansas
- Died: January 9, 1977 (aged 70) Sevier County, Arkansas
- Party: Democratic

Carl Edward Hendrix (August 8, 1906 – January 9, 1977) was an American politician. He was a member of the Arkansas House of Representatives, serving from 1945 to 1950. He was a member of the Democratic Party.
