= Carroll Hollensworth =

American politician

Member of the Arkansas House of Representatives
- In office 1941–1942; 1947–1950; 1953–1955

Speaker of the Arkansas House of Representatives
- In office 1953–1955
- Preceded by: James R. Campbell
- Succeeded by: Charles F. Smith

Personal details
- Born: January 6, 1900 Warren, Arkansas
- Died: May 19, 1959 (aged 59) Warren, Arkansas
- Party: Democratic

Carroll Charles Hollensworth (January 6, 1900 – May 19, 1959) was an American politician in Arkansas. He served in the Arkansas House of Representatives from 1941 to 1942, from 1947 to 1950, and from 1953 to 1955. He was a member of the Democratic party. He served as Speaker of the Arkansas House of Representatives from 1953 to 1955.

He was married to the former Mayme Bird Stevens who was born in Arkansas in 1908 and died in Suffolk County, New York in 1994. He is the father of Judith H Hope, who was the Supervisor of the Town of East Hampton and the former Chairperson of the New York State Democratic Party.
