= William W. Cate =

American politician

Member of the Arkansas House of Representatives
- In office 1895–1896; 1903–1907

Speaker of the Arkansas House of Representatives
- In office 1905–1907
- Preceded by: John Isaac Moore
- Succeeded by: Allen H. Hamiter

Personal details
- Born: William Warner Cate; September 1, 1870 Jonesboro, Arkansas
- Died: January 8, 1927 (aged 56) Jonesboro, Arkansas
- Party: Democratic

William Warner Cate (September 1, 1870 – January 8, 1927) was an American politician. He was a member of the Arkansas House of Representatives, serving from 1895 to 1896 and from 1903 to 1907. He was a member of the Democratic Party.
