= Means Wilkinson =

American politician (1908–1991)

Member of the Arkansas House of Representatives
- In office 1933–1942

Speaker of the Arkansas House of Representatives
- In office 1941–1943
- Preceded by: John M. Bransford
- Succeeded by: R. W. Griffith

Personal details
- Born: Norman Means Wilkinson; October 26, 1908 Greenwood, Arkansas, U.S.
- Died: November 11, 1991 (aged 83) Greenwood, Arkansas, U.S.
- Party: Democratic

Norman Means Wilkinson (October 26, 1908 – November 11, 1991) was an American politician. He was a member of the Arkansas House of Representatives, serving from 1933 to 1942. He was a member of the Democratic Party.
