= Clarence E. Bell =

Arkansas Senator (1957-1993)

Member of the Arkansas Senate
- In office 1957–1993

President pro tempore of the Arkansas Senate
- Preceded by: Olen Hendrix
- Succeeded by: Robert Harvey

Personal details
- Born: February 1, 1912 Camden, Arkansas, U.S.
- Died: 1997 (aged 84–85)
- Party: Democratic
- Spouse: Hope Raney (m. 1936)
- Children: 3

Clarence Elmo Bell (February 1, 1912 – 1997) was an educator and politician in Arkansas. A Democrat, he served nine terms in the Arkansas Senate from 1957 to 1993 including as president of the Arkansas Senate. The state archives have various photos of him.

He was born in Camden, Arkansas and graduated from Camden High School. He attended Ouachita Baptist College in Arkadelphia. He received a master's degree from the University of Alabama. He was principal at Parkin High School and became a school superintendent.

He married Hope Raney on August 16, 1936. They had two daughters and a son.
