= E. C. Fleeman =

American politician

Member of the Arkansas House of Representatives
- In office 1945–1962

Speaker of the Arkansas House of Representatives
- In office 1959–1961
- Preceded by: Glenn Walther
- Succeeded by: John P. Bethell

Personal details
- Born: Eugene Cecil Fleeman; July 4, 1907 Harrisburg, Arkansas, U.S.
- Died: February 4, 1962 (aged 54) Palm Beach, Florida, U.S.
- Party: Democratic
- Profession: banker

Eugene Cecil Fleeman (April 13, 1907 – February 4, 1962) was an American politician. He was a member of the Arkansas House of Representatives, serving from 1945 to 1962. He was a member of the Democratic party.
