= Irving Neale =

American politician

Irving C. Neale

Member of the Arkansas House of Representatives
- In office 1925–1932

Speaker of the Arkansas House of Representatives
- In office 1931–1932
- Preceded by: W. H. Abington
- Succeeded by: Kemp Toney

Personal details
- Born: Irving Christopher Neale; March 2, 1876 Fort Smith, Arkansas, U.S.
- Died: October 28, 1932 (aged 38) Fort Smith, Arkansas, U.S.
- Party: Democratic

Irving Christopher Neale (October 10, 1894 – October 28, 1932) was an American politician. He was a member of the Arkansas House of Representatives, serving from 1925 to 1932. He was a member of the Democratic party.
