= J. Ed Thompson =

American politician (1886–1976)

Member of the Arkansas Senate from the 28th district
- In office January 13, 1947 – January 8, 1951
- Preceded by: W. O. Irby
- Succeeded by: W. J. Hurst

Member of the Arkansas House of Representatives from Greene County
- In office January 14, 1929 – January 14, 1935
- Preceded by: Jason L. Light
- Succeeded by: Adrian Coleman

Personal details
- Born: John Edward Thompson; January 20, 1886; Paragould, Arkansas, U.S.
- Died: August 8, 1976 (aged 90); Paragould, Arkansas, U.S.
- Political party: Democratic
- Spouse: Mattie Miller (m. 1909)
- Children: 3, including Mack
- Parent: Joe A. Thompson (father)
- Occupation: Farmer; businessman; politician; judge

John Edward Thompson (January 20, 1886 – August 8, 1976) was an American politician, who served in the Arkansas House of Representatives and Arkansas Senate.

Arkansas House of Representatives
Preceded by Jason L. Light	Member of the Arkansas House of Representatives; 1929–1935 from Greene County	Succeeded by Adrian Coleman
Arkansas Senate
Preceded by W. O. Irby	Member of the Arkansas Senate; 1947–1951 from the 28th district (Clay County and Greene County)	Succeeded by W. J. Hurst
