= W. H. Abington =

American politician

Member of the Arkansas House of Representatives
- In office 1927–1930; 1937–1938; 1945–1946

Speaker of the Arkansas House of Representatives
- In office 1929–1931
- Preceded by: Reece Caudle
- Succeeded by: Irving C. Neale

Member of the Arkansas State Senate
- In office 1923–1926; 1931–1934; 1939–1944; 1949–1951

Personal details
- Born: January 2, 1871 Des Arc, Arkansas, US
- Died: March 19, 1951 (aged 80) Beebe, Arkansas, US
- Party: Democratic

Military service
- Allegiance: United States
- Branch/service: Arkansas National Guard
- Rank: Major
- Unit: 1st Arkansas Infantry (153rd Infantry)
- Battles/wars: Mexican Border War; World War I

William H. Abington (January 2, 1871 – March 19, 1951) was an American politician who was a member of the Arkansas House of Representatives, representing White County, Arkansas, and Arkansas State Senate. He was a member of the Democratic Party. He also represented the 27th District, which comprises White County and Faulkner County, Arkansas.

He was a Major, Commanding Officer and surgeon of the 1st Arkansas Infantry Regiment and reported to Alexandria, Louisiana to go to Camp Beauregard. He was also a member of the National Guard.

He taught at the College of Physicians and Surgeons (now University of Arkansas for Medical Sciences [UAMS]). In 1927, he was involved in the debate over state-funded schools and two new additions to that list. In 1943, he sponsored the Senate Bill No. 65 known as the Anti-Violence Law which received criticism.

He died in 1951. His childhood home is listed on the National Register of Historic Places.

== See also ==
- 48th Arkansas General Assembly
