= Creed Caldwell =

Creed Caldwell Sr. (1864–1934) was an attorney and politician in Arkansas. He served in the Arkansas House of Representatives and the Arkansas Senate, representing the 11th district. He lived in Jefferson County, Arkansas.
