= Joe Hardage =

American politician

Member of the Arkansas House of Representatives
- In office 1911–1914

Speaker of the Arkansas House of Representatives
- In office 1913–1914
- Preceded by: R. F. Milwee
- Succeeded by: Lewis E. Sawyer

Personal details
- Born: November 20, 1869 Deroche, Clark County, Arkansas
- Died: December 29, 1929 (aged 60) Clark County, Arkansas
- Party: Democratic
- Occupation: lawyer

Josiah Hardage (November 20, 1869 – December 29, 1929) was an American politician. He was a member of the Arkansas House of Representatives, serving from 1919 to 1925. He was a member of the Democratic party.
