= Roy Milum =

Arkansas politician

President of the Arkansas Senate
- In office 1939
- Preceded by: F. S. Armstrong
- Succeeded by: W. B. Smith

Member of the Arkansas Senate
- In office 1953–1962
- In office 1923–1945

Personal details
- Born: Roy Wamon Milum; January 16, 1883
- Died: May 19, 1963 (aged 80)
- Party: Democratic
- Spouse: Audra Connerly
- Children: 4
- Education: University of Arkansas
- Profession: Politician, businessman

Roy Wamon Milum Sr. (January 16, 1883 – May 19, 1963) was a businessman and state senator in Arkansas. He served in the Arkansas Senate from 1923 to 1945 and again from 1953 until 1962. He was President of the Arkansas Senate in 1939. He was a Democrat. He was referred to as the dean of the Arkansas Senate, and no one had served in it longer at the time of his death.

He was from Lead Hill and graduated from the University of Arkansas.

He lived in Harrison, Arkansas. He married Audra Connerly and had four children.
