= Harve B. Thorn =

American politician

Member of the Arkansas House of Representatives
- In office 1931–1938

Speaker of the Arkansas House of Representatives
- In office 1935–1938
- Preceded by: Kemp Toney
- Succeeded by: John M. Bransford

Personal details
- Born: August 28, 1885 Harrisburg, Arkansas
- Died: October 1962 (aged 77) Jonesboro, Arkansas
- Party: Democratic

Harvey Bell "Harve" Thorn Sr. (August 28, 1885 – October 1962) was an American politician. He was a member of the Arkansas House of Representatives, serving from 1931 to 1936. He was a member of the Democratic party.
