= 2010 Arkansas Senate election =

- November 2, 2010

17 of 35 seats in the Arkansas Senate 18 seats needed for a majority
	Majority party	Minority party
Leader	Bob Johnson (term-limited)	Kim Hendren
Party	Democratic	Republican
Leader since	January 12, 2009
Leader's seat	18th–Bigelow	9th–Gravette
Seats before	27	8
Seats after	20	15
Seat change	▼7	▲7
Popular vote	72,207 (Note: Vote totals do not include uncontested races, which were not on the ballot)	107,275
Percentage	39.99%	59.42%
Seats up	15	2
Seats won	8	9
- Democratic hold Republican gain Republican hold No election Democrats: Unopposed; Republicans: 50–60% 60–70% Unopposed; No election
President Pro Tempore before election
Bob Johnson
Democratic
Elected President Pro Tempore
Paul Bookout
Democratic

Elections to the Arkansas Senate were held on November 2, 2010, to elect 17 candidates to the chamber. Members of the Arkansas Senate serve staggered four-year terms, with these seat's last elections taking place in 2006. In a national election characterized as a "red wave", Democrats lost seven of their fifteen state senate seats up for election to the Republicans, ending their supermajority status and leaving them with a narrow majority of three seats. Every seat won by a Democrat was not contested by a Republican.

This election took place alongside races for U.S. President, U.S. Senate, U.S. House, governor, state house, and numerous other state and local elections.

== Overview ==
District	Incumbent			Results
District	Senator	Party	Outcome	Results
5th	Hank Wilkins	Democratic	Incumbent term-limited. Democratic hold.	Democratic primary: ▌ ✓ Stephanie Flowers: 4,798 votes, 56.16%; ▌David Rainey: 3,746 votes, 43.84%
6th	Ed Wilkinson	Democratic	Incumbent term-limited. Republican gain.	▌ ✓ Bruce Holland (Republican) 14,838 votes, 60.71%; ▌ John Wells (Democratic) 9,602 votes, 39.29%
10th	Paul Miller	Democratic	Incumbent term-limited. Republican gain.	▌ ✓ Missy Irvin (Republican) 14,865 votes, 59.30%; ▌Curren Everett (Democratic) 10,204 votes, 40.70%; Republican primary: ▌ ✓ Missy Irvin: 1,381 votes, 51.70%; ▌Paul White: 1,290 votes, 48.30%
11th	Robert F. Thompson	Democratic	Incumbent re-elected.	▌ ✓ Robert F. Thompson (Democratic) Unopposed
13th	Denny Altes	Republican	Incumbent term-limited. Republican hold.	Republican runoff: ▌ ✓ Jake Files: 2,463 votes, 57.48%; ▌Frank Glidewell: 1,822 votes, 42.52%; Republican primary: ▌ Jake Files: 2,555 votes, 39.82%; ▌ Frank Glidewell: 2,392 votes, 37.28%; ▌Jim Medley: 1,470 votes, 22.91%
14th	Paul Bookout	Democratic	Incumbent re-elected.	▌ ✓ Paul Bookout (Democratic) Unopposed
15th	Steve Bryles	Democratic	Incumbent term-limited. Democratic hold.	Democratic primary: ▌ ✓ David Burnett: 5,742 votes, 64.79%; ▌Barrett E. Harrison: 3,121 votes, 35.21%
16th	Jack Crumbly	Democratic	Incumbent re-elected.	Democratic primary: ▌ ✓ Jack Crumbly: 7,228 votes, 65.64%; ▌Alvin L. Simes: 3,784 votes, 34.36%
18th	Bob Johnson	Democratic	Incumbent term-limited. Republican gain.	▌ ✓ Jason Rapert (Republican) 15,418 votes, 54.90%; ▌Johnny Hoyt (Democratic) 11,603 votes, 41.32%; ▌Gregory D. Slocum (Green) 1,062 votes, 3.78%
19th	Terry Smith	Democratic	Incumbent term-limited. Republican gain.	▌ ✓ Bill Sample (Republican) 14,071 votes, 57.15%; ▌Gene Shelby (Democratic) 10,550 votes, 42.85%; Democratic primary: ▌Gene Shelby: 5,372 votes, 53.71%; ▌Q. Byrum Hurst: 4,630 votes, 46.29%
21st	Barbara Horn	Democratic	Incumbent term-limited. Democratic hold.	Democratic primary: ▌ ✓ Steve Harrelson: 6,396 votes, 53.35%; ▌Ken Cowling: 5,592 votes, 46.65%
22nd	Shane Broadway	Democratic	Incumbent term-limited. Republican gain.	▌ ✓ Jeremy Hutchinson (Republican) 21,331 votes, 59.45%; ▌Dawn Creekmore (Democratic) 14,551 votes, 40.55%; Democratic primary: ▌ ✓ Dawn Creekmore: 7,007 votes, 73.59%; ▌Todd Witham: 2,515 votes, 26.41%; Republican primary: ▌ ✓ Jeremy Hutchinson: 5,333 votes, 57.80%; ▌Dan Greenberg: 3,893 votes, 42.20%
27th	Steve Faris	Democratic	Incumbent term-limited. Democratic hold.	Democratic primary: ▌ ✓ Mike Fletcher: 6,212 votes, 54.16%; ▌Jack McCoy: 5,257 votes, 45.84%
28th	Bobby Glover	Democratic	Incumbent term-limited. Republican gain.	▌ ✓ Eddie Joe Williams (Republican) 14,328 votes, 63.96%; ▌Lenville Evans (Democratic) 8,072 votes, 36.04%
29th	John Paul Capps	Democratic	Incumbent term-limited. Republican gain.	▌ ✓ Jonathan Dismang (Republican) 12,424 votes, 61.97%; ▌Sandra Prater (Democratic) 7,625 votes, 38.03%
34th	Tracy Steele	Democratic	Incumbent term-limited. Democratic hold.	Democratic primary: ▌ ✓ Linda Chesterfield: 4,588 votes, 62.36%; ▌Jay Barth: 2,769 votes, 37.64%
35th	Bill Pritchard	Republican	Incumbent re-elected.	▌ ✓ Bill Pritchard: (Republican) Unopposed
