= Creekmore =

Creekmore is an American surname. The surname likely emerged as a habitational name for Creekmoor; however, instances of the surname are not found in current English records. Notable people with the surname include:

- Dawn Creekmore (born 1965), American politician
- Frederick H. Creekmore (born 1937), politician and former Democratic member of the Virginia House of Delegates
- Hubert Creekmore (1907–1966), American poet and author from the small Mississippi town, Water Valley
- Marion V. Creekmore Jr. (born 1939), American diplomat
- Mike Creekmore (born 1964), American politician
- Nate Creekmore (born 1982), American cartoonist
- Raymond Creekmore (1905–1984), prolific artist, author and sailboat designer
- Sam Creekmore IV (born 1966), American politician
- Will Creekmore (born 1989), American basketball player

== See also ==
- Cregmore (disambiguation)
- Creekmore 34
- Odessa J. Komer (née Creekmore)
