= Denny Altes =

American politician (born 1948)

Member of the Arkansas House of Representatives from the 76th district
- In office January 10, 2011 – January 2015
- Preceded by: Frank Glidewell
- Succeeded by: Mathew Pitsch

Member of the Arkansas Senate from the 13th district
- In office January 13, 2003 – January 10, 2011
- Preceded by: Gunnar Delay
- Succeeded by: Jake Files

Member of the Arkansas House of Representatives from the 14th district
- In office January 11, 1999 – January 13, 2003
- Preceded by: W.L. “Mac” McGehee
- Succeeded by: Kevin Penix

Personal details
- Born: May 12, 1948 (age 78) Houston, Texas, USA
- Party: Republican
- Spouse: Susan Altes
- Children: Bobby and Ana Altes
- Education: Arkansas Tech University; University of Arkansas; University of Mississippi
- Profession: Businessman

Military service
- Allegiance: United States of America
- Branch/service: United States Army
- Years of service: 1966–1970
- Rank: Military Police
- Unit: Panmunjon

Robert Dennis Altes, known as Denny Altes (born May 12, 1948) is a former state representative for Arkansas House District 76. A Republican, he is also the former Minority Leader of the Arkansas Senate. From 1999 to 2003, he served previously in the state House from District 14.

== Early life and education ==
Altes was the first graduate of Southside High School in Fort Smith, Arkansas before attending Arkansas Tech University in Russellville. In college, he was drafted into the U.S. Army during the Vietnam War and was stationed in Panmunjom, Korea, where he served in the military police. Upon his return he completed a Bachelor of Science in Business Administration and later attended graduate school at the University of Mississippi in Oxford and the University of Arkansas in Fayetteville. He is a member of the American Legion and the Disabled American Veterans.

== Career ==
In 1974, Altes founded Altes Company and Environmental Systems, of which he was the president. From 1982 until 2007, he was president and CEO of Resourect Recycling Inc., which merged with Fibresource, Inc., in 1991.

Before the start of his legislative career, Altes was a justice of the peace for the Sebastian County Quorum Court, equivalent to county commission in other states. In January 1999, he won a special election to serve the remainder of the term of former State Representative W. K. "Mac" McGehee's term in the Arkansas House. In 2000, he sought re-election unopposed for House District 14.

In 2002, Altes ran for the vacated District 13 Senate seat and was re-elected in 2006. In the 86th General Assembly, he served as Senate Minority Leader and Assistant President Pro Tempore.

Altes served on a number of committees in the Arkansas General Assembly. Altes was the chairman of the Joint Performance Review committee and also served on the Arkansas Legislative Council (ALC) – Senate, Joint Budget Committee, Joint Revenue & Tax – Senate Rules committee, Senate Transportation, and Technology committee and the Insurance and Commerce committee during his time in the Senate. The Arkansas Chapter of American Family Association gave him an 80% evaluation in 2005.

== Personal life ==
He and his wife, Susan, have two children, Bobby and Ana, and six grandchildren, Cole, Caroline, Andrew, Madelyn, Gabriel, and Dallas. Representative Altes and his wife are members of First Baptist Church in Fort Smith, where he serves as a deacon.
