= General Assembly of Arkansas Territory =

Legislature of Arkansas Territory

General Assembly of the Territory of Arkansas
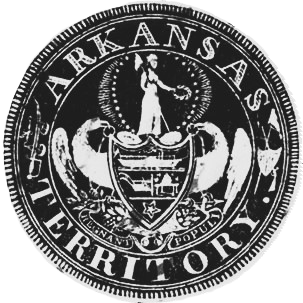
- Seal of the Arkansas Territory

Type
- Type: Bicameral
- Houses: Legislative Council; House of Representatives

History
- Founded: February 7, 1820
- Disbanded: November 16, 1835
- Succeeded by: Arkansas General Assembly

Leadership
- President of the Council: Edward McDonald (first); Charles Caldwell (last)
- Speaker of the House: William Stevenson (first); John Wilson (last)

Elections
- First election: November 20, 1819
- Last election: August 3, 1835

Meeting place
- 1820–1821 Arkansas Post
- 1821–1835 Little Rock

Constitution
- United States Constitution

The General Assembly of the Territory of Arkansas, commonly known as the General Assembly, was the legislature of the U.S. territory of Arkansas, from 1819 to 1835. The General Assembly was directly elected, albeit on a restricted franchise. Its legislative power was subject to veto by the appointed Governor.

== History ==
=== Establishment ===
Upon assuming the duties of the governor's office in July, 1819, Territorial Secretary Robert Crittenden issued a proclamation calling a session of the territorial legislature at Arkansas Post for July 28, 1819. The only other act of any real importance performed by him during the nearly six months that he was acting governor, before Governor James Miller arrived, was the calling of a general election for November 20, 1819. At this first election five members of a legislative council one from each of the five organized counties and nine members of a house of representatives were elected, besides a territorial delegate to Congress.

In authorizing the selection by popular vote of the members of a legislative council, Crittenden overreached his authority. The law which prescribed the mode of government for the Territory, as then constituted, plainly provided that the people should elect by popular choice a house of representatives; the members of this house should then meet, at such time as the governor should appoint, select the names of eighteen persons whom they deemed qualified for the office of councilmen and forward the whole list of those so nominated to the President of the United States. Upon receiving such a list of nominations, it was the duty of the President to appoint nine of the same to be members of the council.

Whether Crittenden's error was due to ignorance or imprudence is uncertain. But, at all events, owing to the good sense and prudent statesmanship of Governor Miller, Congress was induced to pass a special Act, which the President approved April 21, 1820, making the election of the councilmen, in the manner authorized by Crittenden, legal after the fact in April after the election in November. Thus Arkansas was raised from a Territory of the first grade one with a legislative council whose members were to be appointed by the President to a Territory of the second grade, in which members of both branches of the territorial legislature were elected by the people themselves.

=== 1st General Assembly ===
On December 29, 1819, Governor Miller issued his proclamation calling a special session of the General Assembly for the first Monday in February, 1820, to meet at Arkansas Post. Accordingly, the first legislature elected by the people convened February 7, 1820. The Council contained one member from each of the five counties, with Edward McDonald (Lawrence County) elected council president, and Richard Chamberlain clerk. The House of Representatives contained nine members; William Stevenson was chosen speaker of the house and Jason Chamberlain, clerk. Stevenson resigned the day after his election and Joseph Hardin was elected to fill the vacancy. The general assembly created Miller County and Phillips County, and moved the county seat of Pulaski County to Cadron. It also created appropriations to fund the territorial government, and passed minor acts. The two houses continued in session until February 24, when they adjourned to meet again on the first Monday in October, which was October 2.

==== Council ====
District	Name	Party
Arkansas	Sylvanus Phillips	
Clark	Jacob Barkman	
Hempstead	David Clark	
Lawrence	Edward McDonald	
Pulaski	John McElmurry	

==== House of Representatives ====
District	Name	Party
Arkansas	William O. Allen	
Arkansas	William B.R. Horner	
Clark	Thomas Fish	
Hempstead	John English	
Hempstead	William Stevenson	
Lawrence	Joaz Hardin	
Lawrence	Joseph Hardin, Sr.	
Pulaski	Radford Ellis	
Pulaski	Thomas H. Tindall	

Over the summer, Arkansas County's representative (and Brigadier General of the Territorial Militia) William O. Allen was killed in a duel. A special election was held, and Joseph Stilwell was seated in the autumn adjourned session.

This adjourned session lasted until October 25, 1820. At the adjourned session in October, the most notable Act passed was that removing the seat of government to Little Rock, the Act to take effect June 1, 1821. Crawford County and Independence County were also created.

=== 2nd General Assembly ===
Members of the second General Assembly were elected August 6, 1821. They met in regular session October 1, 1821, at Little Rock. Sam C. Roane was elected president of the legislative council; Richard Searcy, secretary. William Trimble was elected speaker of the house of representatives; Ambrose H. Sevier, clerk. The laws passed were, for the most part, measures of local character. The most important Act of the session, perhaps, was that changing the manner of voting at general elections from ballot to Viva voce. On account of the absences of Governor Miller, who had gone to New Hampshire on business, Robert Crittenden was acting governor during the session, which adjourned October 24, 1821.

=== 3rd General Assembly ===
Members of the third General Assembly were elected August 4, 1823. They met in regular session October 6, 1823. Sam C. Roane was elected president of the legislative council; Thomas W. Newton, secretary; Terence Farrelly was speaker of the house of representatives; David E. McKinney, clerk. The session lasted until October 31, 1823.

=== 4th General Assembly ===
Members of the fourth General Assembly were elected August 1, 1825. They met in regular session October 3, 1825. The session lasted until November 3, following. Jacob Barkman was elected president of the legislative council; Thomas W. Newton, secretary. Hobart Bean was speaker of the house; David Barber, clerk.

=== 5th General Assembly ===
Members of the fifth General Assembly were elected August 6, 1827. They met in regular session, October 1, 1827. Daniel T. Witter was elected president of the council; Thomas W. Newton, secretary. Ambrose H. Sevier was speaker of the house; Andrew Roans, clerk. The session adjourned October 31, 1827. The fifth General Assembly held a special session from October 6 until October 22, 1828. At this session, Sevier, who had been elected delegate to Congress in December, 1827, to fill the vacancy caused by the death of Henry W. Conway, was succeeded by Edwin T. Clark, as president of the legislative council. Daniel T. Witter, who had been speaker of the house during regular session, and who had resigned his seat in the house, was succeeded by John Wilson as speaker.

=== 6th General Assembly ===
Members of the sixth General Assembly were elected August 3, 1829. The members met in regular session October 5, 1829. Charles Caldwell was elected president of the council; John Caldwell, secretary. John Wilson was speaker of the house; Daniel Ringo, clerk. The session lasted until November 21, 1829.

=== 7th General Assembly ===
Members of the seventh General Assembly were elected August 1, 1831. They met in regular session October 3, 1833. Charles Caldwell was elected president of the council; Absalom Fowler, secretary. William Trimble was speaker of the house; G. W. Ferebee, clerk. The session lasted until November 7, 1831.

=== 8th General Assembly ===
Members of the eighth General Assembly were elected August 5, 1833. They met in regular session October 7, 1833. John Williamson was elected president of the council; William F. Yeomans, secretary. John Wilson was speaker of the house; James B. Keatts, clerk. The session lasted until November 7, 1833.

=== 9th General Assembly ===
Members of the ninth and last General Assembly of the Territory were elected August 3, 1835. They met in regular session October 5, 1835. Charles Caldwell was elected president of the council; S. T. Sanders, secretary. John Wilson was speaker of the house; L. B. Tully, clerk. The session lasted from October 5 until November 16, 1835. The only really important Act passed during this session was the Act which provided for the election of delegates to, and the holding of, a convention for the purpose of framing a state constitution. Accordingly, the first steps were taken in the process which won Arkansas admission into the Union.

== See also ==
- List of Arkansas General Assemblies

== Sources ==
- Herndon, Dallas T. (1922). Outline of Executive and Legislative History of Arkansas. Special edition printed for distribution by the Arkansas History Commission. Ft. Smith, Ark.: Calvert-McBride Printing. LCCN 23027102. OCLC 1050267138. OL 7084386M – via Internet Archive.
- Herndon, Dallas T. (1947). Annals of Arkansas. Vol. 1–4. Hopkinsville, Kentucky: The Historical Record Association. ISBN 978-1-56546-450-6. LCCN 48002456. OCLC 3920841.
- Hinshaw, Jerry E. Call the Roll: The First One Hundred Fifty Years of the Arkansas Legislature. Little Rock, Arkansas: Arkansas Department of Heritage and Rose Publishing Company. OCLC 1104803799.
- Woodruff, William E., ed. (1821). Laws of the Territory of Arkansas. Arkansas. OCLC 145385617 – via Internet Archive.

First None recognized before	Legislature of Arkansas Territory; February 7, 1820 – November 16, 1835	Succeeded by Arkansas General Assembly
