= John Vines (politician) =

American politician

Member of the Arkansas House of Representatives from the 25th district
- In office January 2011 – January 2017
- Preceded by: Gene Shelby
- Succeeded by: Les Warren

Personal details
- Born: September 14, 1973 (age 52)
- Party: Democratic
- Education: University of Arkansas; University of Arkansas School of Law (JD)
- Profession: Attorney
- Website: vines4staterep.com

John T. Vines (born September 14, 1973) is an American politician and a former Democratic member of the Arkansas House of Representatives from 2011 to 2017.

== Education ==
Vines earned his bachelor's degree from the University of Arkansas and his JD from the University of Arkansas School of Law.

== Elections ==
- 2012 Vines was unopposed for the May 22, 2012 Democratic Primary and won the November 6, 2012 General election with 6,615 votes (62.4%) against Republican nominee Michael Jones.
- 2010 When House District 25 Representative Gene Shelby ran for Arkansas Senate and left the seat open, Vines won the May 18, 2010 Democratic Primary with 1,461 votes (46.1%), and was unopposed for the November 2, 2010 General election.

== Arkansas House Bill 2028 ==
In 2013 Vines introduced House Bill 2028, "An Act To Regulate The Practices Of Credit Card Issuers; And To Establish The Terms To Be Used In Credit Card Transactions." The Bill "established the terms to be used in credit card transactions", including the legal definition for "creditor" to mean "a person, business, financial institution, or commercial enterprise that owns the credit card account." The law was voted in by the Senate on April 18, 2013, and by the House on April 19, 2013. In a Bloomberg Law 2016 article that compared how different states were approaching the "national tidal wave of consumer debt litigation, driven by aggressive junk-debt buyers" Bloomberg reported that H. B. 2028 provided creditors and debt buyers "with a presumption of accuracy in credit card debt cases with a final billing resulting in debt buyers can more frequently "sue the wrong consumer, seek the wrong amount, attempt to collect on debts that have already been paid, file actions on debts barred by the applicable statute of limitation or seek payment on debts previously discharged in bankruptcy."

== Popular culture ==
John Oliver featured a video of Vines introducing the Bill on his twenty-minute segment on Debt Buyers on his June 6, 2016 HBO show, Tonight with John Oliver.
