= Frances Hunt =

American politician

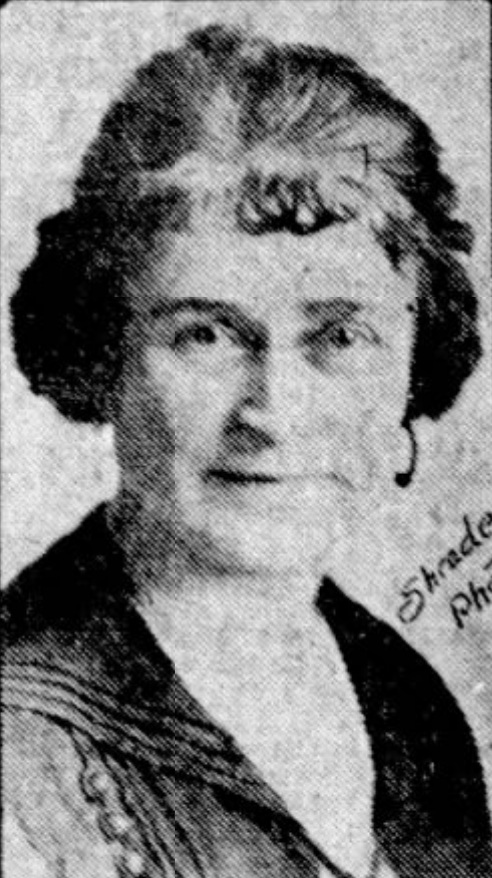
- Hunt, from a 1923 newspaper
- Born: Frances Rowena Mathews; June 6, 1874; Des Arc, Arkansas, U.S.
- Died: August 21, 1958 (aged 84); Pine Bluff, Arkansas, U.S.
- Other name: Frances Jones
- Occupations: Politician, clubwoman, state official
- Spouse(s): Henry Pearce Jones; Sidney Jackson Hunt

Frances Rowena Mathews Jones Hunt (June 6, 1874 – August 21, 1958) was an American Progressive Era politician. She was the first woman to hold to a seat in the Arkansas General Assembly, when she was appointed to fill a vacancy in 1922. Later that year, Hunt was one of the first two women elected to seats in the Arkansas House of Representatives.

== Early life ==
Mathews was born in Des Arc, Arkansas, the daughter of Allen C. Mathews and Julia Ann Wair Mathews. Her father was a newspaper editor and a Confederate States Army veteran of the American Civil War. After he died in 1891, she lived with her widowed mother and siblings in Redfield. She worked as a printer in Benton as a young woman.

== Career ==
Hunt was elected postmistress of the Arkansas House of Representatives in 1905. In 1922, she and another woman (a Mrs. Wilson) were appointed to fill vacant seats in the House; the legislature was out of session at the time, but they were the first two women to be sworn-in members of the Arkansas legislature. Hunt was elected to the seat later that year, when she and Erle Rutherford Chambers became the first two women elected to seats in the Arkansas legislature.

Hunt and Chambers co-sponsored a bill on maternal and infant health. Hunt was re-elected in 1924. She chaired the committee on Confederate soldiers and widows, and successfully sponsored a bill to establish a state board to inspect cosmetology schools. She did not run for a third term, but continued to work in politics at the state level, and was an inspector for the Board of Cosmetic Therapy until 1938.

Hunt was active in church, clubs, women's suffrage, and temperance groups in Pine Bluff, and a member of the United Daughters of the Confederacy and the Daughters of the American Revolution.

== Personal life ==
Mathews married twice. Her first husband was lawyer Henry Pearce Jones. They married in 1899, and he died within a year, while she was pregnant with their son, Henry Jr. She married again in 1905, to Arkansas legislator Sidney Jackson Hunt. They had two children together. She raised her grandson, Henry P. Jones III, after his mother died in childbirth. She died in 1958, at the age of 84, in Pine Bluff. The Frances M. and Sidney J. Hunt Letters are in the Arkansas State Archives.
