= Jack Crumbly =

American politician

Member of the Arkansas Senate from the 16th district
- In office 2007–2012

Personal details
- Born: Widener, Arkansas
- Education: University of Arkansas

Jack Crumbly is an American educator, restaurateur, and politician in Arkansas who served as a Democrat in the Arkansas Senate. His re-election to the Senate in 2006 was by a marginal majority, which caused controversy that resulted in precedent being set should such cases occur again.

== Election Controversies ==
=== 2006 election ===
Crumbly's 68-vote majority for his election victory in 2006 was disputed by his opposition, Representative Arnell Willis of West Helena, who claimed that the votes were not accurately counted. The case moved through the courts to lengthy Senate hearings, until it was unanimously voted that Crumbly should take to his seat, which he served from 2007-2012. The handling of the marginal result established precedence for potential future disputes in Senate election results - the courts have consistently ruled that it is the constitutional duty of legislative bodies to determine the qualifications of their own members, and who should be seated.

Willis' response to the results, whilst unpopular and discounted at the time, have served as a small precursor to the moves replicated by other members of the Republican party a decade on, such as Donald Trump's claims of election fraud before the announcement of his victory in the 2016 Presidential election, and the significant response from the Republican party in 2020 as spread in a disinformation campaign by Trump after Biden's election - resulting most notably in the insurrection on the Capitol building on January 6, 2021 - as well as the general rise of conspiracy theories within the party.

=== 2012 election ===
In May 2012, Crumbly lost the Democratic primary election to Keith Ingram, running for District 24, instead of his incumbent seat for 16, due to district boundaries having been redrawn. Crumbly sued the state Board of Apportionment for racial gerrymandering, accusing them of lowering the Black vote to help Ingram, who is white. A three-judge panel of Republican appointees dismissed the case filed by Crumbly and residents of East Arkansas.

== Personal life ==
Crumbly is married with three children.
