= Barbara Horn =

American politician

Member of the Arkansas Senate from the 21st district
- In office January 13, 2003 – January 10, 2011
- Preceded by: Mike Beebe
- Succeeded by: Steve Harrelson

Member of the Arkansas Senate from the 4th district
- In office January 8, 2001 – January 13, 2003
- Preceded by: Wayne Dowd
- Succeeded by: Sharon Trusty

Member of the Arkansas House of Representatives from the 20th district
- In office January 11, 1993 – January 8, 2001
- Succeeded by: Ken Cowling

Personal details
- Born: October 11, 1936 (age 89) Mountain Pine, Arkansas
- Party: Democratic

Barbara Horn (born October 11, 1936) is an American politician who served in the Arkansas House of Representatives from the 20th district from 1993 to 2001 and in the Arkansas Senate from 2001 to 2011.
