= Arkansas Territorial Militia =

Militia of Arkansas Territory

Militia of the Territory of Arkansas
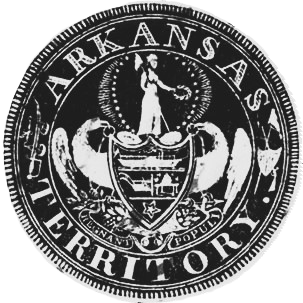
- Seal of Arkansas Territory
- Active: 1804–1836
- Country: United States
- Allegiance: Arkansas Territory
- Type: Militia
- Role: Land warfare

The Militia of the Territory of Arkansas, commonly known as the Arkansas Militia, was the forerunner of today's Arkansas National Guard. The current Arkansas Army National Guard traces its roots to the creation of the territorial militia of the District of Louisiana in 1804. As the District of Louisiana evolved into the Territory of Missouri and the first counties were organized, regiments of the Missouri territorial militia were formed in present-day Arkansas. Territorial governors struggled to form a reliable militia system in the sparsely populated territory. When the Arkansas Territory was formed from the Missouri Territory, the militia was reorganized, gradually evolving from a single brigade composed of nine regiments to an entire division composed of six brigades, each containing four to six regiments. The local militia organization, with its regular musters and hierarchy added structure to the otherwise loosely organized territorial society. The Territorial Militia was utilized to quell problems with the Indian Nations and was held in readiness to deal with trouble along the border with Mexico due to an ambiguous international border and during the prelude to the Texas War of Independence.

== Creation of a territorial militia ==
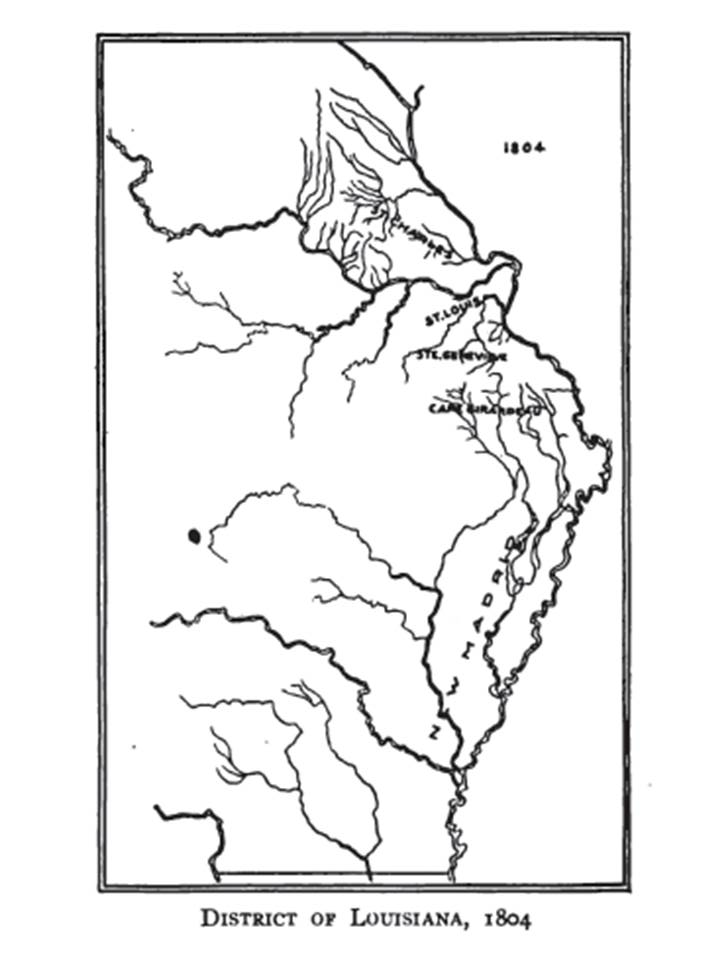

The history of the Arkansas militia begins in 1804, when the United States bought a huge tract of land west of the Mississippi River from France. At the time of the transaction, now known as the "Louisiana Purchase", the area that would eventually enter the Union as the State of Louisiana was referred to as the District of Orleans. The area north of present-day Louisiana was referred to as the District of Louisiana. At first the new "District of Louisiana" was attached to Indiana Territory for administrative purposes. In 1804 the District of Louisiana was designated as the Louisiana Territory and the new territory was subdivided into districts – namely, St. Charles, St. Louis, Ste. Genevieve, Cape Girardeau, and New Madrid – stretching along the Mississippi River with no definite boundaries to the west. The area of the present State of Arkansas lay within the District of New Madrid, which stretched from the present Arkansas-Louisiana state line to the present city of New Madrid, Missouri. The authorities found that there were few people in the new territory, especially the area which was later to become Arkansas, to enroll in the militia. Low and swampy, early Arkansas attracted few settlers, and many of those who did come were itinerant French hunters and trappers who were hardly temperamentally fit for the militia, which required a fairly settled population. The last census conducted under French rule in 1803 "estimated" that the Arkansas Post District had a population of 600 with a militia of 150.

=== Militia law of the District of Louisiana ===
In October 1804, the governor and judges of Indiana Territory met as a legislative body to begin the process of formulating laws for the huge District of Louisiana. It is from this date that the Arkansas National Guard tracks its earliest formation.

The Militia Act of 1804 contained 24 subsections. It made all males between the age of 16 and 50 liable for militia service excepting superior court judges, supreme court judges, the attorney general, the supreme court clerk, all licensed ministers, jail keepers, and those exempted by the laws of the United States. The act laid out the number of officers required for each company, battalion and regiment and required privates and officers to arm themselves "with a good musket, a sufficient bayonet and belt, or a fuse, two spare flints, a knapsack, and a pouch with a box therein to contain not less than twenty-four cartridges, ... knapsack, pouch, and powder horn, with twenty balls suited to the bore of his rifle, and a quarter of a pound of powder". Companies were required to muster every other month, Battalions in April and Regiments in October. Militiamen who failed to attend muster would be fined after being tried by court martial, which the commanders were given authority to convene. The act also created the office of Adjutant General and detailed his responsibilities. for the formation of the formation of "independent troops of horse, and companies of artillery, grenadiers, light infantry, and riflemen." Section 24 of the law allowed for the formation of volunteer companies.

When, in the opinion of the commander in chief, such corps can be conveniently raised, and equipped, independent troops of horse, and companies of artillery, grenadiers, light infantry, and rifle men, may be formed, which shall be officered, armed and wear such uniforms as the commander in chief shall direct.

These independent companies were the only units in the militia that were to be issued standardized uniforms, arms and equipment. Formation of independent of volunteer companies would become an important part of society. While there are very few records of any governor during the territorial or antebellum period turning out an entire militia regiment for service other than the required musters, there are ample examples of volunteer or "independent" companies turning out for service during times of war or conflict.

=== Arkansas District, Territory of Louisiana ===
By 1806, the lower two thirds of the District of New Madrid was re-designated as the District of Arkansas; the area had two militia units: one cavalry company and one infantry company. Despite the small population, it appears that the early Arkansans enrolled in the militia in fairly large numbers.

A roster of militia appointments for the District of Arkansas dated July 14, 1806, demonstrates that the new U.S. Administration attempted to promote continuity and stability in the newly acquired territory by appointing a mixture of existing colonial militia leaders and early settlers:

Major Francois Vaugine
Captain of Cavalry Francois Valier (Valliere)
Lieutenant of Cavalry Jacob Bright
Cornet Pierre (Peter) LeFevre
Captain of Infantry Leonard Kepler
Lieutenant of Infantry Anthony Wolf
Ensign Charles Bougie (Bougy)

Major David Delay, inspector and adjutant general

Major Francois Vaugine, came to Arkansas as the adjutant-major to the Commander of the Post of Arkansas in the late 1780s. Vaugine had previously served in Company 4, 1st Battalion, Standing Regiment of Louisiana, Spanish Army, allied with U.S. Forces during the American Revolution. Vaugine was approximately 19 at the time of this appointment, but as the son of a noble family, appointment to military office at young age was not uncommon. Vaugine's service as an officer did not end there. Records indicated that he served as captain of militia in the Spanish service in the District of Arkansas in 1791, 1792 and as late as 1799. Major Vaugine became a U.S. Citizen after the Louisiana purchase and was appointed as a Judge. Major Vaugine would continue to serve in the Territorial Militia until at least 1814.

Captain of Cavalry Francois Bernard Valliere was the son of Joseph Bernard Valliere, a former commander of the Post of Arkansas during the colonial period. The Valliere and Vaugine families intermarried and remained prominent citizens during the U.S. administration. Don Joseph Valliere was given the Spanish largest land grant in the Colony. Francois Valliere was at the same time appointed to serve as a Justice of the peace and Common Pleas for the District of Arkansaw [sic].

Lieutenant of Cavalry Jacob Bright owned a large trading house at Arkansas Post.

Cornet Pierre (Peter) LeFevre was also a colonial resident of Arkansas. A Pierre LeFevre, Sr, and an un-named son appear in the 1791 census of Arkansas Post, and he received a land grant from the last Commandant of the Post of Arkansas. A Pierre Lefevre, of Arkansas Post, petitioned the last Colonial Commandant, for an extension of his land grant in order to build a sawmill and the petition was granted. Pierre LeFevre, Sr. and Pierre LeFevre, Jr. appear on the 1816 territorial tax list.

Captain of Infantry Leonard Kepler was born in 1770 at Arkansas Post. Leonard Kepler was at the same time appointed to serve as a Justice of the peace and Common Pleas for the District of Arkansaw [sic].

Ensign Charles Bougie (Bougy) had come to Arkansas Post with the Federal Troops who took possession in 1804. He was involved in trade with the Native Americans at Arkansas Post.

=== Militia law of the Territory of Louisiana ===
In 1807, the legislature of the Louisiana Territory passed an updated and expanded Militia Act. The new law had forty-two sections. The maximum age of inhabitants who were required to serve was reduced from 16–50 to 16–45. Militia officers were now required to wear the same uniform as the United States Army. It increased the frequency that companies were to muster up to 12 times per year, battalions six times, and regiments twice. It created the office of brigade inspector and set the pay of the adjutant general at $150 per year. The procedures for courts martial and the collection of fines and other punishments were significantly expanded; fathers were held liable to pay the fines of sons, up to the age of 21, who failed to attend muster; officers were required to attend training sessions to be conducted on the Monday before a scheduled muster in order to receive training regarding their duties and on the proper forms of drill. The legislature indicated that where its laws were not detailed enough, militia leaders were to look to the regulations of Barron Steuben which had been adopted by Congress in 1779.

==== Service in volunteer companies encouraged ====
Section 37 of the Militia act of 1807 again addressed the formation of volunteer or independent troops of horse and companies of artillery, grenadiers, light infantry, and riflemen. Service in these independent companies was by encouraged by exempting members from fines for failure to attend musters of the regular militia and "[e]very trooper who shall enroll himself for this service, having furnished himself with a horse, uniform clothing and other accoutrements, shall hold the same exempted from taxes, and all civil prosecutions, during his continuance in said corps".

==== Louisiana Territory Militia Act of 1810 ====
The legislature of the Louisiana Territory amended the militia law in 1810 to provide for an Inspector General of the Militia with an annual salary of $250. At the same time the legislature did away with the salary of the post of brigade inspector and reduced the number of times that the militia would drill each year to six. The legislature also repealed the requirement for officers to meet on the Monday for training before a muster.

=== Louisiana Territory becomes the Missouri Territory ===
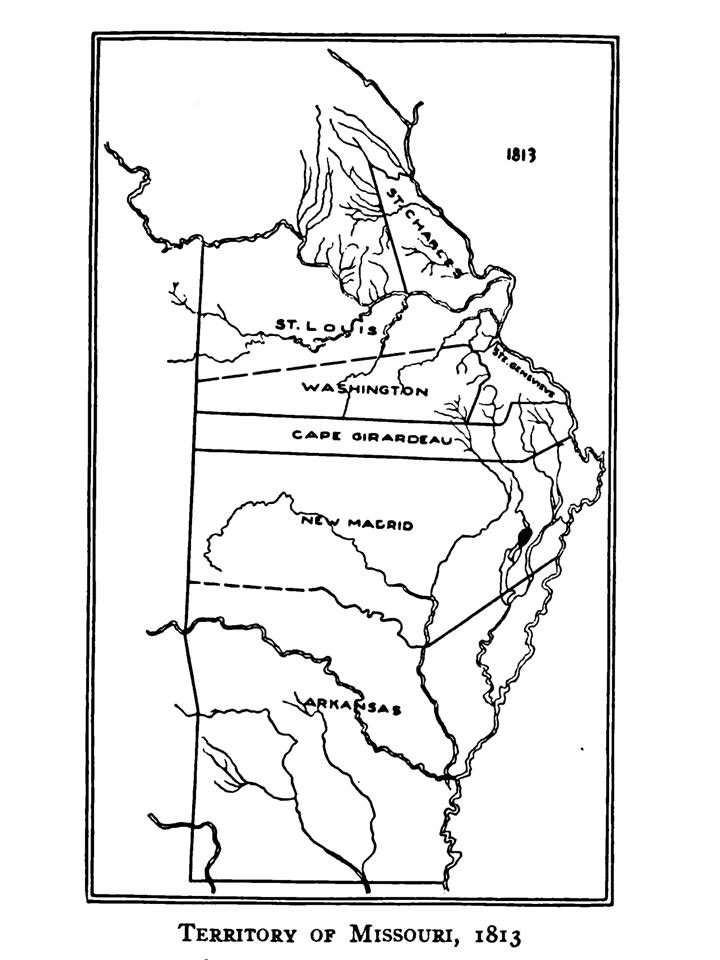
Map showing the Districts (later known as counties) of the Missouri Territory in 1813

On July 7, 1807, the law establishing the District of Arkansas was repealed by the Louisiana Territorial legislature and the authority of the District of New Madrid was extended over the area formerly known as the District of Arkansas. It was further ordered that all papers and records of the District of Arkansas be delivered to the District of New Madrid.

By the summer of 1812, the Territory of Orleans (present-day Louisiana) was prepared to be admitted to the union as a state. It was thought that the first state to be admitted from the Louisiana Purchase should bear the name Louisiana, so on June 4, 1812, Louisiana Territory was renamed Missouri Territory.

=== War of 1812 ===
The first serious test of the new territorial militia came during the War of 1812 which lasted from June 18, 1812, to February 18, 1815. The British provided arms to their Indian allies to conduct attacks on American settlers in Missouri and the Northwest territories for several years prior to the commencement of the war. The British viewed the Indian Nations inhabiting the Mississippi River Valley as valuable allies and a buffer to its Canadian colonies. The Sauk and Fox tribes were key British allies in the war along the western frontier. While no major land battles were fought in the region during the war, the skirmishes with the Indian nations and their British allies in the area north of the Missouri River continued throughout the war and until well after the official conclusion of the war in 1815.

GENERAL ORDER TO THE MILITIA OF THE TERRITORY OF MISSOURI

1 MARCH 1813

... When companies muster, after the Captain has exercise and inspected his company, they will distribute his company into classes, such as the 1st, 2nd and 3rd class. The first class has the honor of being first called into the field.

... No citizen soldier may be ignorant of the manner in which the law requires him to be equipped, he is reminded that is his duty to provide himself with a good musket, with bayonet and belt, or a fusil, two spare flints, a knapsack, powder horn and pouch, with 20 balls, and a quarter of a pound of powder.

... The great boy of the militia will do their duty ... the work is their own – the defense of their own fields and fire sides. They have the character, too, of American to support, and the blessings of a mild system of government to preserve.

Frederick Bates, acting commander in Chief.

c

William Carr, aide de camp.

On April 1, 1813, the Militia of the Territory of Missouri was reorganized, under an Act of Congress of the United States providing for the Government of the Territory of Missouri. Since the District of Arkansas had been dissolved. The militia for the former District of Arkansas was officially designated as the 3rd Battalion (Arkansas) of the 5th Regiment, County of New Madrid. Major Vaugine remained in command and the following officers were announced:

Major Francois Vaugine

1st Company:

Daniel Mooney Capt,
Harrold Stillwell Lt,
Tenace Racine Ensign

2nd Company:

James Scull Capt,
Peter Lefevre Lt,
Charles Bougy Ensign

3rd Company:

Blassingham H. McFarlane Capt,
John Lemmon Lt,
William Dyle Ensign

==== Missouri ranger companies ====
The history of constant British agitation and conflict with the Indian nations lead territorial delegates to the U.S. Congress to urge for the creation of Ranger Companies to assist with patrolling and construction of forts along the Missouri Frontier. In the winter of 1812–13, Congress passed a law authorizing the president to expand the army by raising additional companies of rangers for the protection of the frontiers. In the spring of 1813, three ranger companies were accepted by the Governor of the Missouri Territory.

Among those recruited for service in the Missouri Rangers were members of the Territorial Militia from the District of Arkansas. Thirteen members of the 7th Regiment, Arkansas County, Missouri Territorial Militia eventually filed claims for pay for services rendered during the war. The petition claimed that the militia men were called into service in May, 1813 and that they had served for three months in Ranger Companies organized by Captains Daniel M. Boone, David Musick and Andrew Ramsay. The petition alleged that the militia men had ... not been paid for their services.

PETITION TO CONGRESS BY U. S. MISSOURI RANGERS

December 17, 1814

To the Honorable the Senate and House of Representatives of the United States of America, in Congress assembled.

The petition of the Undersigned inhabitants of the Territory of Missouri Most respectfully sheweth,

That in the Spring of the Year 1813, when the Frontiers of this and the adjacent Territory were in great danger, they with others who were disposed to avenge the wrongs committed upon their Countrymen in this quarter, and as they understood under the authority of the then Secretary at War joined certain companies of Rangers that were then raising in this Territory, under the command of Captains Daniel M Boone. David Musick, and Andrew Ramsay: That the companies were organized each to consist of the same Number as one of the Companies in the Twenty Regiments then authorized to be raised-Towit. one Hundred and Eight Men including officers- non commissioned officers. Musicians and privates.

... That your petitioners entered the said service as privates and were received Mustered and inspected about the Twentieth day of May in the same Year, and continued therein until about three Months thereafter when they were dismissed by Brigadier General Howard, ... ... That since the time of their dismissal, all their efforts to obtain payment for their Services, thus rendered, have been unavailing, and in violation of one of the Maxims of a just Government, that compensation shall be made for all services the public require and receive from individuals-..-.They might with much truth and propriety urge the great sacrifices they made in leaving their families in the Spring, at a time when it was necessary to put in their Crops, to defend their Country. and the losses they have experienced from being put out of employ. the remainder of the Year; but they content themselves in submitting the facts to the National Legislature in the just hope and expectation that they will receive that compensation to which they are justly entitled for their services and that your Honorable bodies will take the circumstances of their case into your wise consideration and grant them relief And they,

St Louis December 17, 1814

John H. Mifflin
John Liousal Lefeve
John H. Madison
Andrew Sumott
Andrew Litle
Thomas Massie
Gorge Simpson
John Gibson
Edmon Hogan
Mishack Walton of Musicks Company
James Cleaver
Joshua Palen
Corpl Henry Haverstick

Brigadier General Howard endorsed the petition and indicated that the militiamen had been received in to the service of the U. S. in the spring of 1813 as Rangers by direction of the Secretary of War, that they were mustered on 20 May 1813 and continued in service for three months, at which time they were dismissed, and that they have not received any pay for their services. Brigadier General Howard indicated that "The situation of these men is hard and in my opinion calls for releif. [sic] I address you on this subject because it may require a Law to meet their case. They were at the same expence, in equipping themselves as those who are continued in service; and have performed the same duties until their discharge." Among the claimants who signed a petition requesting his pay was Edmund Hogan, who was a resident of what would become Pulaski County and who would eventually be appointed as the Brigadier General of the Arkansas Territorial Militia.

==== The additional militia regiments formed in Arkansas ====
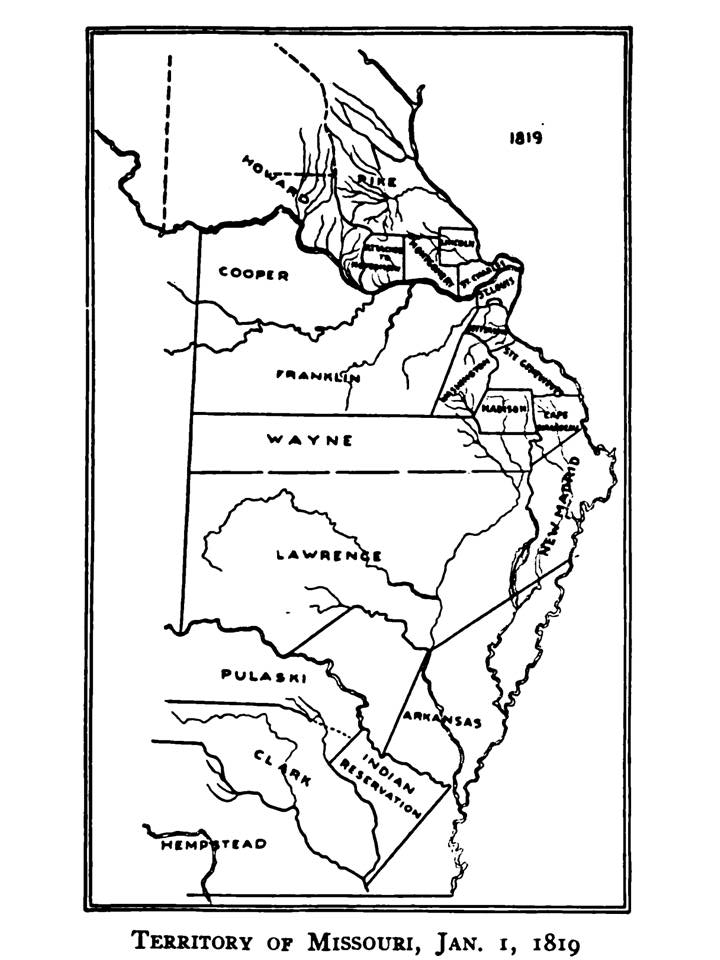

On December 31, 1813, the Missouri Territorial legislature created new counties and at the same time divided the former District New Madrid into the counties of New Madrid and Arkansas. At the same time the militia of Arkansas County was designated as the 7th Regiment, Missouri Territorial Militia. The following regimental officers were appointed:

Lieutenant colonel commandant – Anthony Haden
Major of 1st Battalion – Daniel Mooney

1st Company:

Alexr Kendrick – captain
William Glassen – lieutenant
William Dunn – ensign

2nd Company:

James Scull – captain
Peter Lefevre – lieutenant
Charles Bougy – ensign

3rd Company:

Samuel Moseley – captain
Lemuel Currin – lieutenant

Major of 2nd Battalion – Blassingham H. McFarland (McFarlane)

1st Company:

Edmund Hogan – captain
John Payatte – lieutenant
Joseph Duchassin – ensign

2nd Company:

John C. Newell – captain
Benjamin Murphy – lieutenant
George Rankin – ensign

3rd Company:

William Berney – captain
Isaac Cates – lieutenant
Samuel Gates – ensign

The 7th Regiment apparently included a volunteer company of mounted riflemen; Thomas Reed and Jessie Blackwell are listed as ensign in the company.

The County of New Madrid still included all of what would eventually become Lawrence County, Arkansas. The New Madrid County Militia was renamed the 5th Regiment of the Territorial Militia and the following regimental officers were appointed:

Lieutenant colonel commandant – John M. Hart
Major of 1st Battalion – Stephen Ross

1st Company:

Elisha Winsor – captain
Thomas. Winsor – lieutenant
Joseph Shields – ensign

2nd Company:

Edward Mathews – captain
Jos Smith – lieutenant
James Lucas – ensign

3rd Company:

Benjamin Myers – captain
John Walker – lieutenant
Joseph Westbrook – ensign

4th Company:

Edward Tanner – captain
Andrew. Robertson – lieutenant
Jacob Gibson – ensign

Major of 2nd Battalion – Joseph Hunter
Richard H. Waters – judge advocate
John Walker adjutant.

As was the case in the District of Arkansas, the regimental officers for the County of New Madrid, included men who had served in the French/Spanish colonial militia's prior to the Louisiana Purchase. During the Spanish/French colonial regime there were three companies of militia in New Madrid, two infantry and one company of Dragoons. Captain La Valle, Lieutenant La Forge and Ensign Charpentier were the officers on one company and the other militia company was officered by Captain McCoy, Lieutenant Joseph Hunot, and Ensign John Hart. The company of dragoons was commanded by Captain Richard Jones Waters, with Lieutenant George N. Reagan, and Ensign John Baptiste Barsaloux.

On 15 January 1815, the Missouri Territorial Legislature created Lawrence County from the lower portion of New Madrid County, bounded on the south by Arkansas County. The creation of Lawrence County necessitated the appointment of a separate commander for the county militia. On January 22, 1815, Missouri Governor William Clark commissioned Louis de Mun a lieutenant colonel and commandant of the 8th Regiment Missouri Militia. De Mun, who had command responsibility for all of Lawrence County, was ordered by the governor to "discharge the duty of Lt. Colonel Comdt. by doing and performing all manner of things ..." The Executive Proceedings of Missouri Territory October 1, 1816 – March 31, 1817, contains the following appointments in the 8th Regiment, Missouri Territory (Lawrence County):

Louis De Mun – colonel commandant
John Hines – lieutenant colonel
Robert Bean – major 2nd Battalion

The Treaty of Ghent, ending the War of 1812, was signed on Christmas Day in 1814. By 1816, significant Indian resistance to white settlers in Missouri was at an end.

=== The Militia Law of the Missouri Territory ===
The legislature of the new Missouri Territory enacted a new Militia law in 1815. The Missouri Territory Militia act of 1815 included 47 sections and changed the service requirements. "Every able bodied, free white male inhabitant of this territory, between the ages of eighteen and forty-five years, shall be liable to perform militia duty." This was the first reference to the race or status of militiamen in the territorial militia laws. The act, like the previous militia laws, provided for the formation of volunteer companies in addition to the standard militia regiments and provided for the horse and other equipment of members of these volunteer companies to be tax exempt. The militia law was amended in 1816 to clarify those persons exempt from militia duty, clarify the duties and account responsibility of paymasters, clarify court martial procedures and to provide for the collection of fines levied by courts martial by the sheriff or constable. The Militia law was amended again in 1817 to provide for payment of those members detailed to sit on courts martial, to set the fine for failure to appear at muster at two dollars, and to allow the sheriff a fee of ten percent for collection of fines imposed by the militia courts martial. On December 15, 1818, the Missouri Territorial legislature divided the south western part of Arkansas County into three new Counties named, Pulaski, Clark and Hempstead.

=== Arkansas Territory ===
On March 2, 1819, President James Monroe signed the bill creating Arkansas Territory. The act which created the territory provided that the territorial governor "shall be commander-in-chief of the militia of said territory, shall have power to appoint and commission all officers, required by law, be appointed for said territory ..." The act that created the new territory also specified that all of the existing laws of the Missouri Territory, including its Militia Law, would continue in effect until modified or repealed by the General Assembly of the Territory of Arkansas. The general assembly amended the existing militia law on several occasions, but did not pass a new law of its own until after statehood. At the time of its formation, the territory included the following five counties: Arkansas, Lawrence, Clark, Hempstead, Pulaski.

== First territorial governor, James Miller, 1819–1824 ==
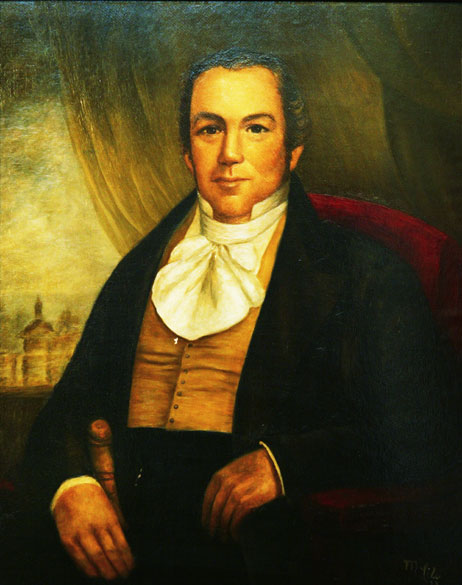
James Miller served as the first governor of the Territory of Arkansas from 1819 to 1824

The first governor of Arkansas Territory, James Miller, seemed at first to be the ideal man to establish a militia in the wild new region. Born in 1776, Miller joined the United States Army at an early age and was commissioned an infantry major in 1808. Soon after the War of 1812 broke out, he was promoted to lieutenant colonel of the Connecticut Volunteers. At the Battle of Lundy's Lane, July 25, 1814, Miller gained fame when he responded "I'll try, sir!" to his commander's question if a British artillery battery on a hilltop could be silenced. The young commander proceeded to take the entire battery, an accomplishment which won for him a promotion to brigadier general as well as a special gold medal from a grateful Congress. Miller distinguished himself in other battles during the War of 1812, including Niagara, Fort Erie, and Chippewa.

The largest hindrance to effectively organizing the militia was the scattered population of only 14,273; and of this number, the majority were scattered around the state on isolated farms. The only real town in Arkansas in 1820 was Arkansas Post, a tiny village of no more than forty houses. To make matters worse, there were few roads in Territorial Arkansas, thereby making communication with the militiamen very difficult. Adjutant General A. P. Spencer noted that some militia units were unable to drill since "the extent of Territory they cover is to [sic] great to muster them at one point ..." As late as 1827, Governor George Izard was complaining of the difficulty of organizing the rural Arkansans into a cohesive militia force: "The scattered state of our Population here and the constant changes of Residence among the Inhabitants make it impractical to organize the Militia in such a manner as may render their Service prompt and efficient".

One of the continual organizational problems from the very start was arms procurement. It was a common misconception that the frontiersmen had plenty of weapons in their own family arsenal to arm the militia. And, indeed, the federal Militia Act of 1792 did provide that militiamen were to provide their own arms and equipment; mounted men were even required to provide their own horse and saddle.

Governor Miller realized that the new Arkansas Militia would need arms, therefore, immediately upon his appointment he went to Washington, D. C. where he received an order of the Army Ordnance Department for weapons. On his way, he obtained 400 stand of arms, 40,000 rounds of ammunition, and fifty pistols from the Army arsenal at Pittsburgh, Pennsylvania. Upon reaching Arkansas, Miller discovered there was no public armory, and was forced to store the weapons in a rented building. Miller worked hard to obtain more arms and accoutrements. A "Return of Militia for 1821", located in the Arkansas History Commission archives, shows that the militia possessed a fairly substantial number of weapons and a diverse variety of related accessories, including: powder horns, pouches, bullet moulds, spare flints, cartridge boxes, and belts.

Army officials sometimes proved to be reluctant to cooperate with Miller in his efforts to arm the militia. The War Department had a policy not to supply arms to any militia where state authorities had not filed reports on its strength. War Department frequently complained of receiving insufficient reports from Arkansas as its adjutants general apparently had difficulty obtaining cooperation from the commanders in the field.

Governor Miller made the first two appointments in the Arkansas Territorial Militia.

=== The first adjutant general ===
The Office of Adjutant General was defined by the Militia Act of 1792 as

Sec. 6. And be it further enacted, That there shall be an adjutant-general appointed in each state, whose duty it shall be to distribute all orders from the commander-in-chief of the state to the several corps; to attend all public reviews when the commander-in-chief of the state shall review the militia, or any part thereof; to obey all orders from him relative to carrying into execution and perfecting the system of military discipline established by this act; to furnish blank forms of different returns that may be required, and to explain the principles on which they should be made; to receive from the several officers of the different corps throughout the state, returns of the militia under their command, reporting the actual situation of their arms, accoutrements, and ammunition, their delinquencies, and every other thing which relates to the general advancement of good order and discipline: all which the several officers of the divisions, brigades, regiments, and battalions,1803, ch. 15 are hereby required to make in the usual manner, so that the said adjutant-general may be duly furnished therewith: from all which returns he shall make proper abstracts, and lay the same annually before the commander-in-chief of the state.

Unlike its modern counterpart, the office adjutant general during the 19th century was not necessarily viewed as a command position. While there are examples of adjutant generals assuming command in the field, as was the case during the Pecan Point Campaign, in general the role of the adjutant general was to act as the military advisor to the governor, conduct inspections and make reports to the commander-in-chief, (the governor) and to the War Department. The governor served as the commander-in-chief and the units were under the day-to-day command of the senior military commander. In the early territorial period, the senior military commander was a brigadier general appointed by the president. After the territorial militia had been divided into multiple brigades, and a division was formed, the senior commanders were major generals. Some adjutant generals during the 19th century did not claim military title, others held the rank of colonel or most usually, brigadier general. This division between the post of adjutant general and brigadier general is confused in certain historical accounts where a brigadier general is referred to as the adjutant general; the brigadier general in fact was in command of the Militia Brigade.

Abner P. Spencer arrived in the Arkansas Territory with Governor Miller in 1820. Spencer had entered the army from New York on April 30, 1813, as a second lieutenant, assigned to the 29th Infantry Regiment. He had been a captain in the War of 1812 and had served in the Niagara campaign along with Governor Miller. Spence served as aide-de-camp to General Jacob Brown during the campaigns of 1813 and 1814. Spencer arrived in Arkansas, along with Governor Miller, by a government boat on Christmas Day, 1819. Spencer was accompanied by his wife and son. Upon reaching Arkansas, it was learned that most of the high ranking posts in the new Territory had been filled, so Governor Miller appointed Spencer Adjutant General of the Territorial Militia. In the early days of the territory, it was common for officials to hold more than one position within the new territory at the same time, so Adjutant General Spencer was also appointed as the sheriff of Phillips County, Arkansas.

General Spencer filed the first known inspection reports of the Arkansas Territorial Militia. The report, dated July 16, 1821, indicates that the adjutant general had inspected three of the five regiments in the territorial militia.

Inspected	1st Regiment, COL J Ross	2nd Regiment, COL John Willis	4th Regiment, MAJ Townsend
Colonels	1	1	
Lieutenant Colonel	1		
Majors			1
Aides	1		
Paymaster	1	1	1
Quartermaster	1	1	1
Surgeon	1	1	1
Surgeon Mate	1	1	1
Captains	4	8	3
1st Lieutenant	4	8	4
2nd Lieutenant	4	8	4
Ensign	2	8	4
Sergeant Major			1
Sergeants	8	24	16
Corporals	6	13	10
Musicians	2		8
Privates	148	385	171
Muskets	15	2	
Cartridge Boxes		2	
Rifles	85	283	131
Powder Horns	73	283	131
Pouches	73	283	131
Bullet Mold	38		131
Fifes	4	2	
Drums	4	2	

The report states that the expenses for the territorial militia for the period ending October 1, 1821, totaled $2,399.79. No reason is given for the fact that the 2nd and 5th Regiments were not included in this inspection report. Spencer served as adjutant general until he resigned in 1823. On June 10, 1823, Terrance Farrelly was appointed to succeed Spencer as adjutant general.

=== The first brigadier general ===
William O. Allen, another veteran of the War of 1812, had secured an appointment as Brigadier General of the Territorial Militia. In the early 19th century the brigadier general had important day-to-day administrative responsibilities similar to those of the modern day adjutant general. President James Monroe accepted the recommendation and nominated Allen for the position. Allen had been elected to the House of Representatives of the Territorial Legislature in November, 1819 and is noted for having asked that the office of adjutant general not be filled until the militia of the territory had been organized into two or more brigades, and for supporting the establishment of the territorial capital at Arkansas Post, rather than Little Rock. On March 10, 1820, while the Senate was in the process of rejecting the nomination of William O. Allen as Brigadier General of the Arkansas Territorial Militia, he was mortally wounded in a duel with Robert C. Oden, a leading Little Rock lawyer. Brigadier General Allen and Oden had apparently quarreled in a tavern at Arkansas Post over a cane which Brigadier General Allen carried. The quarrel resulted in Allen issuing a challenge to Oden and the two met to fight a duel on a sandbar on the south bank of the Arkansas River. Allen's shot apparently struck Oden in the waist, wounding but not killing him. Oden's shot struck Allen in the head. Allen died at a friend's home one week later. Oden would be tried and acquitted of "Receiving a Challenge". This duel resulted in a stiffening of the territorial law against dueling. News of Allen's rejection by the senate apparently arrived in Arkansas after he had died. It appears that Brigadier General Allen had run afoul of the Territorial Secretary, Robert Crittenden and this political difference may have resulted in the rejection of Allen's nomination. General Allen is credited with forming the Arkansas Militia into a brigade and with appointing Alexander S. Walker as the commander of the 1st Regiment, Arkansas Militia.

=== Brigadier General Hogan ===
Governor Miller secured the appointment of Edmund Hogan as brigadier general, in order to replace Brig. Gen. Allen. Edmund Hogan was a wealthy land owner, judge and Speaker of the House of the territorial legislature whose previous military service included 90 days service in the Missouri Ranger Companies during the War of 1812 and an 1814 appointment as Captain of the 1st Company of the 2nd Battalion of the 7th Missouri Territorial Militia Regiment (Arkansas County). Hogan was probably born in Anson County, North Carolina, in 1780 and grew up in Georgia. Early biographer, Josiah Shinn indicated that Hogan had lived in Pulaski County Georgia, he served as a tax collector, sheriff, state legislator, and a lieutenant colonel in the Georgia militia, however there is reason to question these alleged early accomplishments. The date of his settlement in the Missouri Territory is somewhat unclear, as is the nature of his service during the War of 1812. Many early sources give his arrival in the area that would become Little Rock as about 1814, which seems to correspond with his appointment as a captain in the Territorial Militia of Arkansas County, however it appears that he was at least present in the Missouri Territory, if not the District of Arkansas prior to this appointment. There is evidence that Hogan may have originally settled in the District of Cape Girardeau in what is now southeast Missouri, before moving south to the area that would become Arkansas County. In 1798, Hogan owned a farm in the District of Cape Girardeau, across the Mississippi River, from Thebes, Illinois. In 1803, Edmund Hogan is listed among the heads of households in the Cape Girardeau District of the Louisiana Territory, at the time of the Louisiana Purchase by the United States from France. In 1806, he was appointed as a commissioner to help establish the city of Cape Girardeau. He was appointed as a Justice of the Peace for Cape Girardeau on July 8, 1806. His name appears on a September 9, 1811, petition signed by inhabitants of the Territory of Louisiana, asking that Congress pass a Law to admit the area to the Second grade of Territorial Government, which will entitle them to a delegate in Congress. Some of the names on the petition are annotated as residing in the District of Arkansas, but Hogan's is not. Noted Arkansas Historian Margaret Smith Ross, in a 1956 study of squatters rights in early Pulaski County, Arkansas, concluded that Edmund Hogan was present in Pulaski County as early as 1812.

Whatever the date of his settlement near present day Little Rock, Hogan was one of the first to operate a ferry directly across from la petite roche, or "the little rock", a strategic spot on the Arkansas River. Edmund Hogan was the first justice of the peace appointed by the authorities of the Territory of Missouri in Pulaski County upon the formation of the county in 1818. Arkansas County in the third Territorial General Assembly of Missouri in 1816 and 1818 and he served as the Speaker of the House of the Territorial legislature in 1818. On December 18, 1818, Fedrick Bates, Secretary and Acting Governor of Missouri appointed Hogan as Justice of the Peace for several townships in the newly created Pulaski County. In 1821, he was elected as a representative to the Arkansas Legislature from Pulaski County and served until his death in 1828.

By 1820, Hogan had sold the ferry and established his home in Crystal Hill, in Pulaski County. He brought with him several slaves and a large amount of money. He was reputed in the earlier days of the territory to be one of its richest men, but due to numerous lawsuits arising from land transactions, he lost a large amount of his wealth. His residence at Crystal Hill was described as "the center of fashion and intelligence" of Pulaski County. Naturalist Thomas Nuttall visited Hogan on trips through Arkansas Territory in 1819 and 1820 and wrote of Hogan's place as the "settlement of Little Rock." Governor Miller to make Crystal Hill his personal residence and urged that it become the location for the capital of the State.

President Monroe appointed Hogan as the brigadier general of the Arkansas militia on March 24, 1821. General Hogan apparently took great interest in his military position, and in conjunction with Governor Miller tried to improve the readiness of the militia of the Territory. He was most successful in towns like Arkansas Post and Little Rock. He is said to have made a fine appearance in his "regimentals", as did the subordinate officers. During General Hogan's time in office, there were many veterans of the War of 1812 in the territory. The territory contained several men who had risen to the rank of colonel in that war, and hundreds who had been majors, captains or lieutenants. They have been described author Josiah Shinn as "the Western type, free and easy in their manners, very outspoken in their conversation and therefore very hard to control. They were not bad men, but men of independence of character and very tenacious of their opinions."

In addition to an aggressive military reputation, Hogan was also aggressive in business. Hogan had been involved in the rampant land speculation that accompanied the movement of the territorial capital from Arkansas Post to Little Rock. This land speculation led to Hogan's involvement in numerous lawsuits. The result of one of these lawsuits may have led to Acting Governor Crittenden writing to Secretary of War Calhoun on January 30, 1823, regarding the procedures for ordering the arrest of Brigadier General Hogan. Secretary Calhoun responded to Acting Governor Crittenden in a letter dated February 18, 1823, in which he stated that the governor, as the commander-in-chief of the militia, had the authority to arrest any officer of the militia and to order a court martial. The only caveat was that the court martial of a general officer would have to be reviewed and approved by the Secretary of War.

General Edmund Hogan was also a veteran of several heated political campaigns for seats in the council of the Territorial Legislature. Hogan represented Arkansas in the Territorial General Assembly of Missouri in 1816 and 1818, when Arkansas was part of the Missouri Territory. In the election of 1827, there were three candidates, Colonel Walker, General Hogan and Judge Scott. The election was apparently very heated. After the election was over, tensions appeared to calm and everything appeared quiet. On May 31, 1828, a public hanging occurred in Little Rock, which drew spectators from far and near. When the hanging was over Judge Scott made his way to the store of McLane & Badgett on the west side of Main street. He was discussing the circumstances of the hanging, when General Hogan entered the store. General Hogan was a man weighing nearly three hundred pounds, and stood over six feet tall. Judge Scott was a small man, not weighing more than one hundred and thirty pounds. The conversation went on, with both Scott and Hogan taking part, neither showing any animosity to the other. The conversation soon diverged from the hanging to politics, and before the men knew it they were discussing the old Walker and Hogan political race. This seemed to revive in the mind of General Hogan something that occurred in the triangular race between himself, Walker and Scott. He turned to Scott and accused him of writing a letter which was derogatory to Hogan. Scott at once informed the general that he had been misinformed. Hogan reiterated the statement and said that he believed that it was true. Scott denied it again, and apparently accused Hogan of lying. Both men were standing up and as soon as Scott made the last remark, Hogan struck him, knocking him to the floor. Scott remained on the floor for a moment, apparently knocked senseless. As Scott revived, he struggled to his feet, and Hogan prepared to strike another blow. As Scott arose he unsheathed a dirk from a sword cane which he carried and plunged the dirk several times into the body of General Hogan. Hogan fell and expired within an hour. Judge Scott was arrested by his brother, United States Marshal George Scott, and taken before an officer for trial. The facts as stated above were there proven, and the court held Hogan to have been the aggressor and released Judge Scott.

According to Goodspeed's Biographical and Historical Memoirs of Central Arkansas, Hogan's original burial site was on the ground overlooking the Arkansas River where the Old State House now stands. Goodspeed's reported that when an excavation was made in 1885 for improvements to the Old State House, three or four graves were found, containing the remains of Gen. Hogan, his wife Frances, and possibly their children Nancy and James. The bones were then said to have been disinterred and placed in the cornerstone of the new addition. Brigadier Hogan served as brigadier general until he resigned in a letter dated October 14, 1823. William Bradford was appointed by President James Monroe to serve as the Brigadier General of the Arkansas Militia following Brigadier General Hogan's resignation.

=== Terrance Farrelly ===
Terrence Farrelly was born in County Tyrone, Ireland, about 1795, but was brought to Meadville, Pennsylvania, by his parents about the year 1800. He arrived at Arkansas Post in November, 1819, and rented a store from General William O. Allen, where he carried on business until the latter part of 1820. Terrence had not been at his new home long before he became acquainted with the rich young widow, Mrs. Mary Mosely. Mrs. Mosely was described as the richest widow in the territory. He was adjutant-general of the Arkansas militia under Generals W. O. Allen, Edmund Hogan and William Bradford. More than that, famed 19th century Arkansas historian Josiah Hazen Shinn described Adjutant General Farrelly thus:

he was the chief adviser of ... Bradford, and to this advice the territory was indebted for the nine regiments of splendid troops the territory afforded in 1825. We have had adjutant generals since Farrelly's day, but none that could muster an army like he had under his charge. The regiments were real live flesh and blood soldiers, commanded by the following colonels: First Regiment, Jack Wells; Second Regiment, James Lemons; Third, Joseph Hardin; Fourth, James Scull; Fifth, Thomas Dooley; Sixth, Pearson Brierly; Seventh, Hartwell Boswell; Eighth, Daniel Mooney; Ninth, Jacob Pennington. General Terrence Farrelly was not afraid of any of these colonels, nor of all of them combined. He could make and unmake them at pleasure.

=== Election of militia officers ===
The dueling deaths of Brigadier Generals Allen and Hogan demonstrate the difficulty Governor Miller had in recruiting a good officer corps. Mr. Shinn wrote that the Territorial Militia officers were often "of the Western type, free and easy in their manners, very outspoken in their conversation and therefore very hard to control". Indeed, Shinn concludes, the militia was composed of "combustible elements". The method of selecting militia officers contributed to their poor quality. By both law and custom company-level officers, and some at higher levels, were elected by the enlisted men. This frequently resulted in two bad side-effects: (1) popularity, rather than intelligence or ability, became the basis upon which officers were elected; and (2) the militia became deeply immersed in politics. Actually, the militia had long been a stepping stone to political office: George Washington himself had been a Virginia militiaman. Even the backwoodsman Davy Crockett commented on the political nature of the frontier militia when called upon to give his formula for political success: "Intrigue until you are elected an officer of the militia; this is the second step toward promotion, and can be accomplished with ease".

=== First regimental commanders ===
The Militia Act of 1792 had specified the officers which were allotted to the state militias as:

That the said militia shall be officered by the respective states, as follows: To each division, one major-general and two aids-de-camp, with the rank of major; to each brigade, one brigadier-general, with one brigade inspector, to serve also as brigade-major, with the rank of a major; to each regiment, one lieutenant-colonel commandant; and to each battalion one major; to each company one captain, one lieutenant, one ensign, four sergeants, four corporals, one drummer and one fifer or bugler. That there shall be a regimental staff, to consist of one adjutant and one quartermaster, to rank as lieutenants; one paymaster; one surgeon, and one surgeon's mate; one sergeant-major; one drum-major, and one fife-major.

The first regimental commanders after Arkansas became a separate territory were:

Brigade	Regiment	Colonel	County
1st Brigade Arkansas Militia Brigadier General William O. Allen, 1819 Brigadier General Edmund Hogan, 1820–1823 Brigadier General William Bradford, 1823–1826 Brigadier General John Nicks, 1826–1831	1st Regiment of Arkansas Militia	James Mops, February 19, 1820 Samuel W. Rutherford Jacob Wells, February 2, 1824 Allen A. Johnson, October 20, 1826	Clark,
1st Brigade Arkansas Militia Brigadier General William O. Allen, 1819 Brigadier General Edmund Hogan, 1820–1823 Brigadier General William Bradford, 1823–1826 Brigadier General John Nicks, 1826–1831	2nd Regiment of Arkansas Militia	Edmund Hogan, (later BG) February 17, 1829 James Lemmons, July 29, 1820 Robert C. Oden (who earlier killed BG Allen) 1826. Christian Brumback, 1830	Pulaski
1st Brigade Arkansas Militia Brigadier General William O. Allen, 1819 Brigadier General Edmund Hogan, 1820–1823 Brigadier General William Bradford, 1823–1826 Brigadier General John Nicks, 1826–1831	3rd Regiment of Arkansas Militia	John Miller, February 2, 1820 Joseph Hardin, December 3, 1825	Lawrence
1st Brigade Arkansas Militia Brigadier General William O. Allen, 1819 Brigadier General Edmund Hogan, 1820–1823 Brigadier General William Bradford, 1823–1826 Brigadier General John Nicks, 1826–1831	4th Regiment of Arkansas Militia	James Scull, April 17, 1822	Arkansas
1st Brigade Arkansas Militia Brigadier General William O. Allen, 1819 Brigadier General Edmund Hogan, 1820–1823 Brigadier General William Bradford, 1823–1826 Brigadier General John Nicks, 1826–1831	5th Regiment of Arkansas Militia	Alexander Walker, February 18, 1820 Thomas Dooley, December 5, 1823 Edward Crop, October 19, 1828 George Hill, January 23, 1830	Hempstead
1st Brigade Arkansas Militia Brigadier General William O. Allen, 1819 Brigadier General Edmund Hogan, 1820–1823 Brigadier General William Bradford, 1823–1826 Brigadier General John Nicks, 1826–1831	6th Regiment of Arkansas Militia	Pierson Brearly, January 13, 1820 Allen Johnson, October 20, 1828 Oliver Langford Gilbert Marshall, February 6, 1829 Bennett H. Martin, February 9, 1830	Crawford
1st Brigade Arkansas Militia Brigadier General William O. Allen, 1819 Brigadier General Edmund Hogan, 1820–1823 Brigadier General William Bradford, 1823–1826 Brigadier General John Nicks, 1826–1831	7th Regiment of Arkansas Militia	Robert Bean, Hartwell Boswell, September 21, 1824 Townsend Dickson, May 12, 1827	Independence
1st Brigade Arkansas Militia Brigadier General William O. Allen, 1819 Brigadier General Edmund Hogan, 1820–1823 Brigadier General William Bradford, 1823–1826 Brigadier General John Nicks, 1826–1831	8th Regiment of Arkansas Militia	Daniel Mooney, September 14, 1821 Wright W. Elliot, October 20, 1828 William R. Horner, January 16, 1829	Phillips

== Governor George Izard 1824–1828 ==
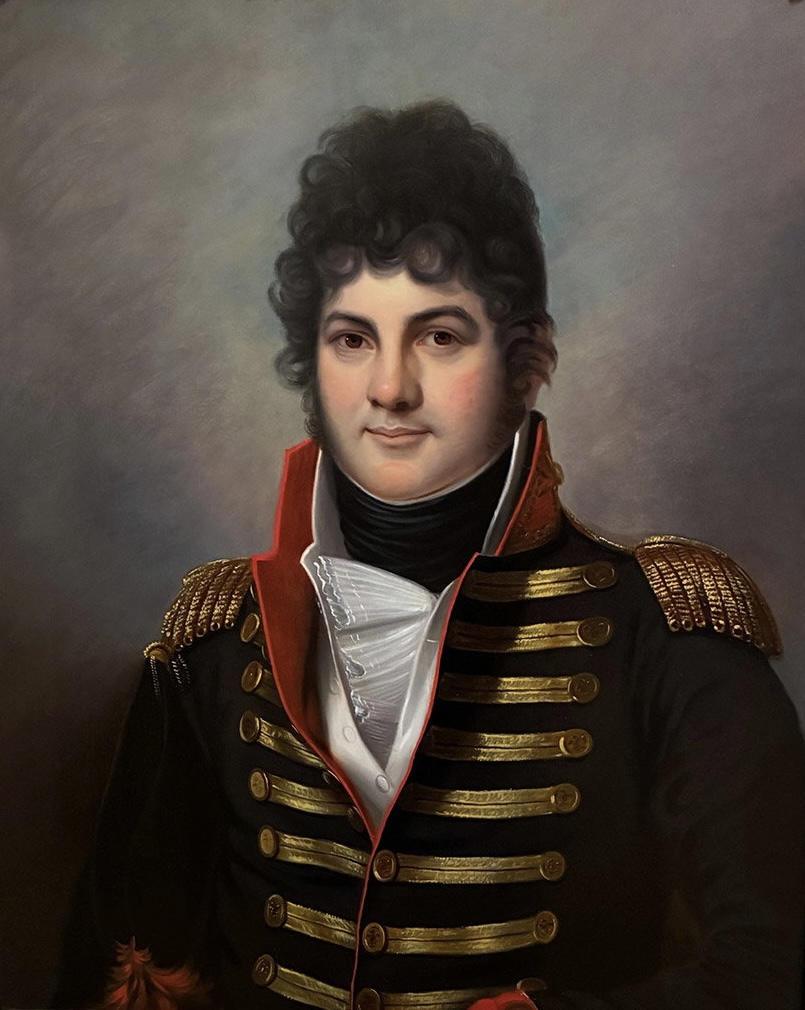
George Izard served as the second governor of the Territory of Arkansas, 1824–1828

When newly appointed governor George Izard arrived in Arkansas on May 31, 1825, he found that his predecessor had been unsuccessful in doing more than a bare minimum of militia organization. He found that the senior leadership of the Arkansas Militia were occupied with other duties. Holding multiple offices had been a common practice under Governor Miller. William Bradford, the Brigadier General of the Arkansas Militia, was living at Fort Towson and serving as the sutler to the 7th Infantry Regiment. Terrance Farrelly, who had been appointed as adjutant general in 1823, was living in Arkansas County and serving as the Sheriff of that county. Izard was the ideal man to bring professional military standards to the rough and tumble Arkansas militia. On June 10, 1825, Izard issued a stern general order to all commanding officers telling them to report immediately to either Brigadier General William Bradford at Fort Towsen or to the Adjutant General's office in Little Rock. "The organization of the Territorial Militia will engage the full attention of the Commander-in-Chief" Izard wrote, "and will be proceeded on without delay." In a direct warning to recalcitrant officers, Izard promised that "the laws for the government of the Militia, will be rigidly enforced ..." Izard's interest in the militia attracted widespread attention and support in the state. However, some Arkansans evidently believed that Izard was fighting a losing battle. The editor of the Arkansas Gazette endorsed Izard's efforts by urging "the ready and hearty cooperation of every class of our citizens ..." But the writer also expressed the belief that the new governor "will find it an arduous task to perform ..." Terrance Farrelly reacted to Izard's efforts by resigning the office of adjutant general in a letter dated June 18, 1825.

=== Code duello and early militia officers ===
Governor Izard appointed Benjamin Desha to succeed Farrelly as adjutant general. Desha was a veteran of the War of 1812 and a close political ally of powerful Territorial Secretary Robert C. Crittenden. To assist in organizing the forces, Izard appointed two aides, Lieutenants Colonel Henry W. Conway and Ambrose H. Sevier, two of the most powerful political leaders in the Territory. Benjamin Desha held the office of adjutant general from 1826 to 1828 before resigning in a scandal following a duel between Robert Crittenden and Colonel/Representative Henry Conway. Crittenden and Conway had argued over a political contest between Colonel Conway and Colonel Robert C. Ogden. Crittenden mortally wounded Conway in the duel which occurred October 29, 1827, on an island in the Mississippi River, opposite the mouth of the White river. Governor Izard next appointed Wharton Rector, Jr. to serve as the adjutant general. Ironically, Rector had served as the "Second" to Henry Conway in his ill fated duel with Crittenden.

=== Arming the Territorial Militia ===
Izard found that the state militia had few arms, and he immediately wrote to the War Department for weapons and ammunition to supplement "some boxes of both deposited in a Merchant's Warehouse" in Little Rock. The Secretary of War refused Izard's request since he had not received "returns" of the militia strength in the Territory. The failure to file complete records with the War Department was a common problem throughout the nation, and Federal legislation had been adopted to prohibit a state or territory from receiving its quota of armaments until all records had been provided. The Arkansas quota had been held up as early as 1821. By 1825, Governor Izard reported that the state armaments still amounted to only 400 muskets, 40 pistols, 200 "cavalry sabers", twelve drums, twelve fifes, 4000 flints, 40,000 musket ball cartridges, and three "wall tents".

=== First militia regulations published ===
Izard worked to whip the militia into shape. He and Brigadier General Bradford pleaded with local commanders to take their responsibilities seriously. Noting that Arkansas lay directly in the path to be used in the removal of the Eastern Indians, the governor spoke frequently of the need "to place the Militia in a condition to afford immediate protection to our settlements, should any disorder attend the passage of those people." Governor Izard's agitation slowly began to get results. In 1825 the legislature authorized the printing of the militia laws of the territory, with a copy of each to go to every officer in the militia. Izard issued three militia reorganization plans in his three years as governor. He worked to regularize musters, established a regimental organization, and tried to improve the officer corps by forcing the resignation of officers who failed to attend musters, left the territory for more than three months, or who failed to send their strength reports. Finally, in November 1827, a bill passed providing for the first complete overhauling of the militia. The act organized the forces into two separate brigades, provided that battalions were to muster annually and companies were to assemble twice yearly, and established an administrative framework to oversee the organization. Izard's periodic reorganization orders, combined with legislation, resulted in the formation of a much more effective militia system for Arkansas Territory.

=== General John Nicks ===
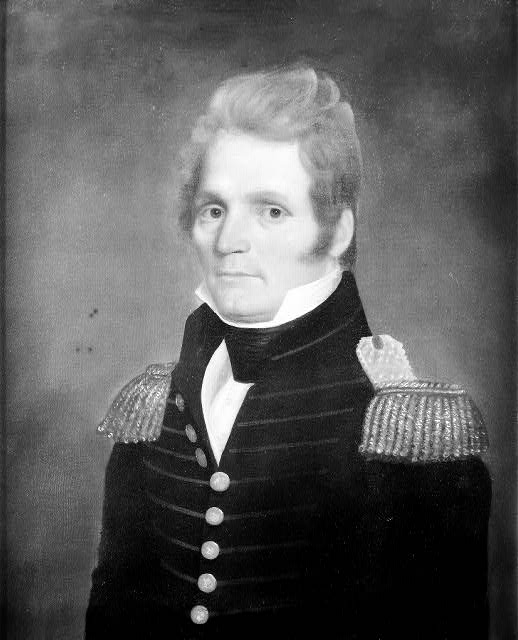
On March 27, 1827, President John Quincy Adams appointed former Lieutenant Colonel Nicks as Brigadier General of the Arkansas Territorial Militia. General Nicks was a veteran of the War of 1812.

General Bradford had continued in service as both the sutler to the 7th Infantry Regiment at Fort Townsen and the Brigadier General of the Militia Brigade of the Territory of Arkansas until his death at Fort Townsen on October 20, 1826. The president nominated former Lieutenant Colonel John Nicks to become the next Brigadier General of the Arkansas Militia. Like his predecessor, General Nicks served as the post sutler to Fort Gibson until his own death at that location on December 31, 1831.

John Nicks was born in North Carolina during the Revolution and entered the United States Army as a captain in the Third Infantry July 1, 1808. He served with distinction through the War of 1812 and was commissioned a major of the Seventh Infantry October 9, 1813. He was honorably discharged from the army on June 15, 1815, and on December 2 following was reinstated as a captain in the Eighth Infantry with the brevet of major. On June 1, 1816, he was promoted to his majority and transferred to the Seventh Infantry. In 1818 he was in charge of the recruiting station at Philadelphia securing recruits for the Seminole War in Florida. During that war he was actively engaged in assembling and furnishing rations and equipment to the soldiers in Florida and commanded troops in Florida and Georgia. He was later in command of the Seventh Military Department with headquarters at Fort Scott, Georgia.

On June 1, 1819, Nicks was commissioned lieutenant colonel and exactly two years later, after thirteen years of service in the army, he received his honorable discharge. On September 28, 1821, he was appointed sutler to the Seventh Regiment then at Fort Jesup, Louisiana, and accompanied that part of his old regiment under Colonel Arbuckle that went to Fort Smith by water and reached there early in the year 1822. After Lieutenant Colonel Nicks took up his residence at Fort Smith he was elected to the Third Territorial Legislature of Arkansas and represented Crawford County in the House of Representatives from October 1823, and was re-elected to the Fourth Legislature serving from October 3, to November 3, 1825.

Upon the establishment of Fort Gibson in April 1824, Colonel Nicks moved with the Seventh Infantry as sutler at the new post. Colonel Nicks led a busy life at Fort Gibson in discharging the duties of sutler and representing eastern Oklahoma in the Arkansas Legislature. After the death at Fort Towson October 20, 1826, of Major William Bradford who was serving there as sutler and was also brigadier-general of the militia of Arkansas, President John Quincy Adams appointed Nicks (March 27, 1827) as brigadier-general to fill the vacancy. General Nicks was appointed postmaster at Fort Gibson February 21, 1827, a station he held to the time of his death. General Nicks became ill at Fort Gibson with pneumonia and after ten days he died on December 31, 1831. His funeral was held the next day at which the Protestant Episcopal service was read, after which he was interred with the full military honors due his rank and service.

=== Militia divided into two brigades ===
The Militia Act of 1792 had specified how the state militia units were to be organized:

the militia of the respective states shall be arranged into divisions, brigades, regiments, battalions and companies, as the legislature of each state shall direct; and each division, brigade and regiment, shall be numbered at the formation thereof; and a record made of such numbers in the adjutant-general's office in the state; and when in the field, or in service in the state, each division, brigade and regiment shall respectively take rank according to their numbers, reckoning the first or lowest number highest in rank. That if the same be convenient, each brigade shall consist of four regiments; each regiment of two battalions; each battalion of five companies; each company of sixty-four privates.

On November 21, 1829, the Arkansas Territorial Legislature passed an act dividing the Arkansas Territorial Militia into two brigades. In April 1830, the United States Congress authorized the Arkansas Territory a second brigadier general to command the second brigade of Arkansas Territorial Militia.

On April 23, 1830, President Andrew Jackson nominated George Hill to command the 1st Brigade of Arkansas Militia and William Montgomery to command the 2nd Brigade of Arkansas Militia. Brig. Gen. William Montgomery's appointment was to replace Brigadier General Nicks. Brigadier General Nicks office as Brigadier General of the 2nd Brigade had been vacated as a result of his residence being outside the boundaries of the Territory of Arkansas due to the establishment of the western boundary of Arkansas Territory in 1828. The county militia regiments were assigned to brigades in the following fashion:

Brigade	Colonel	Date of election	County
1st Brigade Arkansas Militia Brigadier General George Hill, 1830–1836	William B. Woody	February 9, 1830	Washington
1st Brigade Arkansas Militia Brigadier General George Hill, 1830–1836	Charles H. Pelham	Feb 5, 1830	Crawford
1st Brigade Arkansas Militia Brigadier General George Hill, 1830–1836	F. N. Clark	February 9, 1830	Pope
1st Brigade Arkansas Militia Brigadier General George Hill, 1830–1836	Thomas White Stephen Lewis	February 9, 1830 September 9, 1830	Conway
1st Brigade Arkansas Militia Brigadier General George Hill, 1830–1836	Christian Brumbach	July 14, 1833	Pulaski
1st Brigade Arkansas Militia Brigadier General George Hill, 1830–1836	William Baily	February 15, 1830	Jefferson
1st Brigade Arkansas Militia Brigadier General George Hill, 1830–1836	J. Cox	February 9, 1830	Hot Spring
1st Brigade Arkansas Militia Brigadier General George Hill, 1830–1836	Jacob Wells	February 9, 1830	Clark
1st Brigade Arkansas Militia Brigadier General George Hill, 1830–1836	Thomas Franklin Jacob Pennington	June 16, 1820 January 16, 1832	Union
1st Brigade Arkansas Militia Brigadier General George Hill, 1830–1836	William McDonald	February 7, 1831	Hempstead
1st Brigade Arkansas Militia Brigadier General George Hill, 1830–1836	James Conway	October 3, 1825	Lafayette
1st Brigade Arkansas Militia Brigadier General George Hill, 1830–1836	John Clark	February 15, 1830	Sevier
1st Brigade Arkansas Militia Brigadier General George Hill, 1830–1836	John Goodloe Warren Pierson	1825	Miller
2nd Brigade Arkansas Militia Brigadier General William Montgomery			
2nd Brigade Arkansas Militia Brigadier General William Montgomery	William Jarrett	February 5, 1830	Lawrence
2nd Brigade Arkansas Militia Brigadier General William Montgomery	Thomas Culp	May 19, 1830	Izard
2nd Brigade Arkansas Militia Brigadier General William Montgomery			Independence
2nd Brigade Arkansas Militia Brigadier General William Montgomery	Alfred G. W. Davis John Saylor	February 9, 1830 November 11, 1830	Jackson
2nd Brigade Arkansas Militia Brigadier General William Montgomery	Mark W. J. Zando	January 23, 1830	St. Francis
2nd Brigade Arkansas Militia Brigadier General William Montgomery	Mathew Spurlock Elijah F. Floyd	January 4, 1831 August 26, 1832	Crittenden
2nd Brigade Arkansas Militia Brigadier General William Montgomery	James Martin	February 5, 1830	Phillips
2nd Brigade Arkansas Militia Brigadier General William Montgomery	Christopher H. Price	February 5, 1830	Monroe
2nd Brigade Arkansas Militia Brigadier General William Montgomery	Louis Bobby William H. Dye	February 15, 1830 June 6, 1830	Arkansas
2nd Brigade Arkansas Militia Brigadier General William Montgomery	Andrew Carson Horace F. Woldworth	February 9, 1830 February 8, 1830	Chicot

=== Conflict with Native Americans ===
When Arkansas became a territory in 1819 there were several thousand Indians living in the area. Early Arkansas settlers perceived these Indians as dangerous savages. Most of the tribes, the Quapaw, Caddo, and Cherokee, were in actuality quiet and peaceful. Problems also ensued along the Territorial boundary with the Indian nation, with whites and Indians each wandering across the ill defined border. The first recorded clash between the Territorial Militia and Native Americans apparently occurred in 1820. Captain George Gray, Indian Agent for the Cherokee Nation at Sulphur Fork, wrote to Secretary of War John C. Calhoun regarding a claim by the Cherokee Nation that they had been driven from a village along the Red River by two companies of the Arkansas Militia. No records exist indicating whether this action was directed by the territorial governor or was done under the control of local authorities. Calhoun responded to the claim and stated that he lacked sufficient evidence to approve the Cherokee claim for damages resulting from the loss of their villages but pointed out that he could not protect Cherokees if they established villages in areas assigned to whites by treaty.

==== The Pecan Point Campaign ====
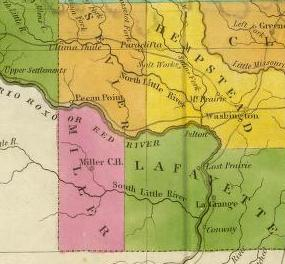
1835 map of Miller County, Territory of Arkansas, including Pecan Point

The Osage tribe, who ranged over much of northwest Arkansas, were a fierce and warlike plains tribe. Mounted on their ponies, the Osage frequently attacked villages of neighboring Indian tribes. Occasionally white settlers would fall victim to the Osage. In March 1820 Reuben Easton, a practically illiterate Arkansas settler, wrote to the War Department complaining of the Osage menace: "There has been a number of murders committed on this river by the Osage indians and a vast number of Robbearys for which the people heir has never Received any Satisfaction ..." The Cherokee, who were given a reservation on lands claimed by the Osage, were a more constant target of their warlike neighbors.

Governor George Izard, who succeeded Miller in 1825, attempted to deal calmly with the Indians. But he was still an old military man, and when trouble between Indians and whites broke out in Miller County in 1828, Izard sent his adjutant general, Wharton Rector, to investigate. Forty-four Pecan Point citizens petitioned Governor Izard on March 20, 1828, asking for protection from hostile Indians. The petition stated that Shawnee and Delaware Indians near the little Miller County settlement of Pecan Point were "pilfering farm houses and Corn-cribs [,] killing Hogs, Driving their Stocks and Horses and Cattle among us ..." If the Indians were not removed, the settlers protested, there was "no prospect but of being oblidged [sic] to abandon our homes and fields."

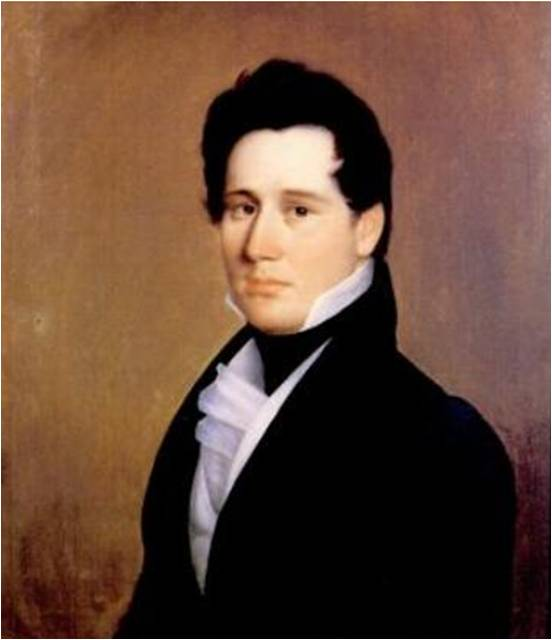
Adjutant General Wharton Rector, 1800–1842

Major John Goodloe Warren Pierson, commander of the Miller County militia, asked the governor for permission to call out his company to move against the Indians. The governor, instead, sent Adjutant General Rector to investigate and if necessary "to remove immediately [the Indians], and should they disobey or resist your authority you will call out such a party of the militia as you may consider adequate to compel obedience".

When Rector reached Pecan Point he found the settlers greatly agitated. The Indians were reported to be stealing and killing livestock and threatening war. Rector immediately ordered the Indians to leave the area, but the Shawnees refused. Calling out sixty-three militiamen under Major Pierson, Rector marched on the main Shawnee village. Just when a battle seemed imminent, the major Shawnee chief announced he would move. The entire Pecan Point foray, about a week in duration, cost the Arkansas militia a total of $503. Governor Izard, in requisitioning reimbursement from the Secretary of War, detailed costs as follows: Adjutant general's salary (for a full month) and expenses, $231; pay for one major for four days, $12; pay for five company officers for three days, $30, pay for 56 privates for three days, $168, rations for all men were a total of $24.

While there were no real battles between the Indians and the Arkansas Territorial militia, the militia did send units on several different occasions to perform patrol duty along the state's western border.

=== Social status ===
One of the primary roles performed by the militia during the territorial period was social. The prominent military historian, Russell F. Weigley has gone so far as to write that "... the volunteer [militia] companies were at least as much a social as a military phenomenon." Residents of Territorial Arkansas spent much of their lives in virtual isolation. Farms were scattered over a huge expanse; roads were few and far between, and towns were small in both number and size. In essence, people were lonely and militia service gave them an opportunity to do something out of the ordinary. Early Arkansans, especially the elite, also had a great affection for military titles. "Colonel" Robert Crittenden was a mere ensign during his military career, and "General" John Harrington had not served in the regular Army at all! John Harrington used the title "Major" which was given to him in the Georgia Militia when he was appointed on 26 Sep 1792 to replace Major Middleton Woods. (Georgia Governors' Journals 1789–1798, Franklin County Page 86). The militia gave status-conscious early Arkansans an easy opportunity to win a military title at very little expense in effort.

The death on December 30, 1828, of a French veteran of the American Revolution, Monsier Le Noir De Servhae serves as a good example of the pageantry of the territorial militia:

This gentleman ... was one of the foreign contingent that lent its assistance to the cause of American Independence. He came to the United States as a French marine with the fleet commanded by Count de Grasse, and was wounded at Yorktown in attacking and carrying one of the British redoubts on the evening of October 14, 1781. Being honorably discharged he returned to France, but in after years came back to the United States and in time found a home in Arkansas near the plantation of Monsieur A. Barraque in Richland township. He was accidentally killed by the falling of a tree and was buried with all the honors of war. It was a grand sight to see the blending of nationalities at this military interment of a foreign hero. Adjutant General Terrence Farrelly, Colonels A. S. Walker, Francis Notrebe, and several companies of the First and Second regiments, Acting-Governor Robert Crittenden and his dashing aide-de-camp, Colonel Yell, made up the military cortege, while the French families from far and near and the American contingent of wealth, prowess and achievement made the occasion a memorable one in early days.

== Governor John Pope, 1829–1835 ==
President Andrew Jackson appointed John Pope to become the third Governor of the Arkansas Territory on March 9, 1829. Pope was a Kentuckian who, due to the loss of an arm as a youth had no prior military experience. On 12 June 1833, Governor Pope appointed William Field to serve as adjutant general.

=== Tensions with Mexico ===
Next to the Indians, the Arkansans were most fearful of their Mexican neighbors in Texas. Much of this trouble was caused by an ill-defined boundary between Arkansas and Texas. The International Boundary between the Arkansas Territory of the United States and the Mexican state of Coahuila and Texas had been defined in the treaty of 1819 between the United States and Spain, but remained unsurveyed in 1827. Because the location of the border was uncertain, the ownership of a considerable area southwest of Red River was in question. Arkansas Territory had, since 1820, exercised jurisdiction over the settlements immediately south of the river, holding them to be a part of Miller County. In 1827 the easternmost portion of the disputed area, approximating the present corner of Arkansas southwest of the river, was assigned by the territorial legislature to the new county of Lafayette. In 1828 Miller County north of the river was abolished and a new Miller County constituted south of the river in what is now northeastern Texas. Miller County, as defined by the Arkansas territorial legislature in 1831, comprised all the present northeastern Texas counties of Bowie, Red River, Lamar, Fannin, and Delta plus parts of eight counties south and west of these.

The Mexicans, naturally, were fearful of the ever-encroaching Americans, and on several occasions feelings ran high between the suspicious neighbors. In 1828, for example, when the Miller County militia was called out to remove the Shawnees from Pecan Point, Mexican officials reminded the Arkansans that the area was claimed by Mexico. Arkansas Adjutant General Rector warned the Mexicans not to interfere. Rector threatened to hang the Mexicans officials "on a tree by the neck like a dog." Two years later the Mexicans rubbed salt in the wounded pride of the Arkansans by threatening to move Mexicans settlers into the disputed Miller County area.

On February 20, 1830, Colonel John Clark, Commandant of the Counties of Miller and Sevier Militia, wrote to Acting Governor William S. Fulton regarding the situation on the south western frontier of the territory.

the inhabitants should have immediate protection; and unless the Executive authority does immediately interpose, Miller County must be depopulated. The settlers are in continual alarm from the Pawnee Indians. There now remains no doubt but that they on the settlements is daily expected. The people here, only want an order from, or the sanction of the Executive to revenge the murder already committed. And, if an order was immediately issued, to raise from 150. to 200 volunteers, (they would be amply sufficient) it would require but a few days, and would perhaps be the means of saving the lives of many families; who, unless they are immediately protected, must fall by the unrestrained hands of those merciless savages.

Colonel Clark also shared his concerns with Colonel Arbuckle of the 7th U.S. infantry in Indian Territory who recommended to Governor Fulton that he employ spys to watch the frontier and to hold the militia of the frontier in readiness.

On April 19, 1830, Acting Territorial Governor Fulton wrote to the Secretary of War to report that he had authorized Colonel John Clark:

to order into service, four persons ..., to act as spies, for the purpose of communicating the earliest information possible, of the approach of Indians upon our settlements in an hostile and threatening attitude ... As it will be impossible to afford timely aid to the inhabitants upon the frontier, in defending themselves against Hostile Indian incur- sions, it is hoped the Citizen soldiers of Miller and Sevier Counties, will make immediate preparations, and hold themselves in constant readiness, promptly to meet and defend themselves against any attack, which may be made upon their settlements. You will order all soldiers under your command to hold themselves in readiness— prepared to take the field at a moments warning: and you are hereby commanded to repel force with force, whenever an attack is made within the bounds of this Territory.

Governor Pope reported to President Jackson on October 4, 1830, that "20 or 30 of our people" had taken the oath of allegiance to Mexico, "& received certificates of right to land with the territory here fore [sic] occupied by this government------" He also reported that the Mexicans had dispatched a small force to establish a fort on Red River and to prevent American from entering Texas. As a precautionary measure Pope had ordered regimental musters of the territorial militia "& warned our citizens ... against taking title or protection" from the Mexican government. The Arkansas Gazette reported October 13, 1830, that Pope had recently made a two weeks excursion to the southern countries and reviewed the militia "at some of the Regimental Musters." Governor Pope thought that the Mexicans were "pressing their claim beyond the line intended & contemplated by the negotiators of old Spain & the United States---"

The Gazette stated on November 3, 1830, that certain Mexican officials had commenced surveying Mexican claims in the disputed border area on October 11 and that they intended to continue until stopped by force of arms. On November 1, 1830, Brigadier General George Hill, commandant of the 3rd Brigade of Arkansas Territorial Militia, reported to Pope that Curtiss Morriss, a citizen of Lost Prairie, had informed him that Mexican surveyor's were surveying the tracts granted to persons who had taken the oath of allegiance to Mexico, and that the Mexican claimants had threatened to dispossess loyal Arkansas citizens who refused to take the oath and whose land lay within the tracts of persons who had taken the oath. These loyal territorial citizens claimed the protection of the United States.

Governor Pope immediately forwarded General Hill's communication to the President. President Andrew Jackson formally protested Mexican actions in the disputed area and was successful in getting Mexican Government authorities to stop actions in the disputed area until the boundary could be settled. The border area enjoyed a brief period of quite until just before the Texas War of Independence.

=== A Militia Muster ===
A muster of the militia during the 1820s or 30s was often an impressive occasion. In more populous areas of the eastern states the local militia company sometimes drilled as often as once a month. But where travel was difficult, as in most of early Arkansas, musters usually took place once or twice a year. The legislature of 1827 specified that battalion drills were to be held annually in October, and company drills were to be held at least twice a year, the first Saturday in April and October. Through the years the date of July 4 evolved as an important mustering time in Arkansas. That was a convenient date to drill since the crops were generally planted by that time, and besides, everyone wanted to have an excuse for a get-together on Independence Day. The muster might begin with the firing of a volley, as was the case in 1837 when Captain Albert Pike's artillery company put on quite a show for the residents of Arkansas' capital city. It is difficult to reconstruct the precise manner in which muster training was carried out for few sources exist on the subject. However, it is likely that training was informal, with a good deal of marching and some practice in the manual of arms. Target shooting frequently was included in the day's activities. It is also likely that the muster ended with a large dinner or party, including a liberal mount of whiskey drinking. Sometimes the heavy whiskey drinking began before the muster actually got under way.

In 1830, the Pulaski County regiment was ordered into a special muster for the purpose of being inspected by the governor. The regimental commander was a German immigrant by the name of Christian Brumbach. Brumbach, though conscientious, was given to ostentatious military display. His uniform was augmented with heavy gold lace and gilt bullet buttons topped off with a cocked hat and large plume. As the men formed for inspection, the commander discovered some were armed with hickory sticks while others shouldered umbrellas. As the governor's party passed in review, a thunderstorm erupted and, much to Commander Brumbach's dismay, many of the militiamen scurried for cover. Those armed with umbrellas remained in formation. The furious Brumbach, his plume drooping in the rain, ordered a court martial to try the runaways. They were each fined five dollars, and soon thereafter Christian Brumbach resigned his command and left Arkansas.

=== Militia re-organized into six brigades ===
On November 16, 1833, Governor Pope signed a bill from the Territorial Legislature which divided the territorial militia into six brigades and formed them into a new division. Each new brigade was authorized a brigadier general to command. The new brigadiers were required to renumber the regiments within their respective brigades and report this number to the major general commanding the division. On December 18, 1835, President Andrew Jackson nominated Stephen V. R. Ryan to command the 2nd Brigade of the Arkansas Militia. The existing county regiments were divided into their new brigades as follows:

Division	Brigade	Colonel	County
1st Division Arkansas Militia	1st Brigade Arkansas Militia	Colonel Thomas J. Mills, February 8, 1836	Mississippi
1st Division Arkansas Militia	1st Brigade Arkansas Militia	Colonel Alphs Madden, September 17, 1833	Phillips
1st Division Arkansas Militia	1st Brigade Arkansas Militia	Colonel Elijah Floyd, August 26, 1833	Crittenden
1st Division Arkansas Militia	1st Brigade Arkansas Militia	Major Alpheus Maddox, September 17, 1833	Monroe
1st Division Arkansas Militia	1st Brigade Arkansas Militia		Green
1st Division Arkansas Militia	1st Brigade Arkansas Militia	Colonel George Birdwell, September 17, 1833	St. Francis
1st Division Arkansas Militia	2nd Brigade Arkansas Militia Brigadier General Stephen V. R. Ryan		
1st Division Arkansas Militia	2nd Brigade Arkansas Militia Brigadier General Stephen V. R. Ryan	Major William Bailey February 15, 1830	Jefferson
1st Division Arkansas Militia	2nd Brigade Arkansas Militia Brigadier General Stephen V. R. Ryan	Colonel William Dye, 6 January 1836	Arkansas
1st Division Arkansas Militia	2nd Brigade Arkansas Militia Brigadier General Stephen V. R. Ryan	Colonel Horace F. Walworth, February 8, 1832	Chicot
1st Division Arkansas Militia	2nd Brigade Arkansas Militia Brigadier General Stephen V. R. Ryan	Major Jacob G. Pennington, January 30, 1832	Union
1st Division Arkansas Militia	2nd Brigade Arkansas Militia Brigadier General Stephen V. R. Ryan	Colonel William McDonald, February 7, 1831	Hempstead
1st Division Arkansas Militia	3rd Brigade Arkansas Militia Brigadier General George Hill		
1st Division Arkansas Militia	3rd Brigade Arkansas Militia Brigadier General George Hill	Colonel James S. Conway, October 23, 1828	Lafayette
1st Division Arkansas Militia	3rd Brigade Arkansas Militia Brigadier General George Hill	Colonel William L. McMillin, April 26, 1832	Sevier and Miller
1st Division Arkansas Militia	3rd Brigade Arkansas Militia Brigadier General George Hill	Colonel A. J. Rutherford, August 7, 1833	Clark
1st Division Arkansas Militia	3rd Brigade Arkansas Militia Brigadier General George Hill		Pike
1st Division Arkansas Militia	4th Brigade Arkansas Militia		
1st Division Arkansas Militia	4th Brigade Arkansas Militia	Colonel William S Lockhardt, August 1835	Pulaski
1st Division Arkansas Militia	4th Brigade Arkansas Militia	Colonel Bennett B. Ball, August 21, 1833	Conway
1st Division Arkansas Militia	4th Brigade Arkansas Militia	Major Alfred G. W. Davis, February 15, 1830	Jackson
1st Division Arkansas Militia	4th Brigade Arkansas Militia	Colonel Hartwell Boswell, March 12, 1827	Independence
1st Division Arkansas Militia	5th Brigade Arkansas Militia		
1st Division Arkansas Militia	5th Brigade Arkansas Militia		Scott
1st Division Arkansas Militia	5th Brigade Arkansas Militia	Colonel Bennel H. Martin February 9, 1830	Crawford
1st Division Arkansas Militia	5th Brigade Arkansas Militia	Colonel William G. W. Tewault, July 9, 1835	Pope
1st Division Arkansas Militia	5th Brigade Arkansas Militia		Johnson
1st Division Arkansas Militia	5th Brigade Arkansas Militia	Colonel Jepee Barlett, August 26, 1833	Hot Springs
1st Division Arkansas Militia	5th Brigade Arkansas Militia		Van Buren
1st Division Arkansas Militia	6th Brigade Arkansas Militia		
1st Division Arkansas Militia	6th Brigade Arkansas Militia	Colonel Daniel Thomason, 3 November 1832	Washington
1st Division Arkansas Militia	6th Brigade Arkansas Militia	Colonel John M. Campbell, February 5, 1834 Colonel John D. Pison, November 23, 1835	Carroll
1st Division Arkansas Militia	6th Brigade Arkansas Militia	Major Thomas Culp, May 19, 1830	Izard
1st Division Arkansas Militia	6th Brigade Arkansas Militia	Colonel William Jarrell, February 5, 1830	Lawrence

== Governor William S. Fulton, 1835–1836 ==
William S. Fulton was appointed by President Andrew Jackson to become the fourth and final territorial governor of Arkansas on March 9, 1835. He served until he was replaced by the first elected governor of the new state of Arkansas in 1836.

=== Renewed tensions with Mexico ===
Troubles along the border with Mexico flared again during the Texas War of Independence Brigadier General George Hill was informed on May 4, 1836, that information had been received indicating that Mexican emissaries were trying to incite the Indian Nations to attack in retaliation for United States support of Texas War of Independence. Governor Futon directed Brigadier General Hill to place organize his brigade and place it in readiness to take the field at once. On June 28, 1836, General Edmund P. Gains (U.S. Army) called upon Governor Fulton one regiment for the defense of the western frontier. Twelve companies would eventually answer this call.

Still, as with the Indians, there was no open military conflict between the Arkansas Territorial militia and the Mexican Government before the Arkansas Territory achieved statehood on June 15, 1836.

== Sources ==
- Heidler, David S.; Heidler, Jeanne T., eds. (1997). Encyclopedia of the War of 1812. Naval Institute Press. ISBN 1-59114-362-4.
- Hitsman, J. Mackay (1965). The Incredible War of 1812. Toronto: University of Toronto Press. p. 27.
- Zuehlke, Mark (2007). For Honour's Sake: The War of 1812 and the Brokering of an Uneasy Peace. Random House. ISBN 978-0-676-97706-6.
