= David Hausam =

Member of the Arkansas House of Representatives from the 2nd district
- In office January 13, 1997 – January 13, 2003
- Succeeded by: Ken Cowling

Personal details
- Born: March 19, 1947 Yakima, Washington, US
- Died: April 25, 2009 (aged 62) Bentonville, Arkansas, US
- Party: Republican

David Hausam (March 19, 1947 – April 25, 2009) was an American politician who served in the Arkansas House of Representatives from the 2nd district from 1997 to 2003.
