= Arnell Willis =

Arkansas politician

Arnell Willis is an American professor, administrator, businessman, and politician in Arkansas. He lost a close Arkansas Senate primary election to Jack Crumbly that was litigated. He served as an alderman in Helena, Arkansas for four years. He served in the Arkansas House of Representatives. He is Baptist.

He was mayor of Helena-West Helena. He endowed a scholarship fund at Shorter College.
