= Redistricting in Arkansas =

Process of drawing electoral district boundaries in state of Arkansas, US

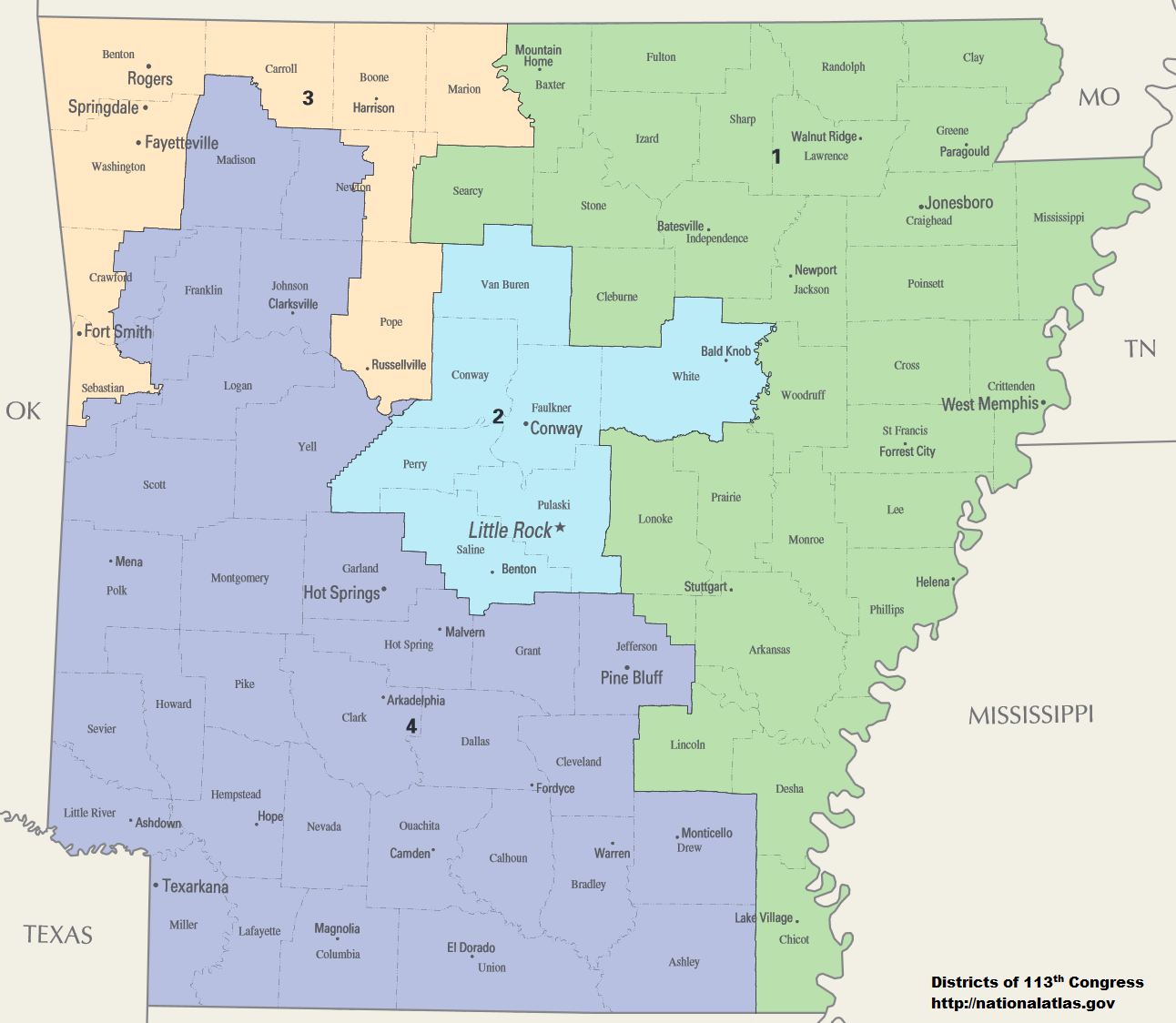
A map of congressional districts of Arkansas, since 2013

The U.S. state of Arkansas, in common with the other U.S. states, must redraw its congressional and legislative districts every ten years to reflect changes in the state and national populations. Redistricting follows the completion of the United States census, which is carried out by the federal government in years that end in 0; the most recent census took place in 2020.

Redistricting for congressional districts is controlled by the Arkansas General Assembly. Districts for the two bodies constituting the General Assembly, the Arkansas House of Representatives (100 members) and the Arkansas Senate (35 senators), is controlled by the three-member Arkansas Board of Apportionment, consisting of the Governor of Arkansas, the Attorney General of Arkansas, and the Arkansas Secretary of State, since 1936.

== Background ==
Reapportionment of representatives between the states every ten years based on new census figures is required by Article I, Section 2 of the U.S. Constitution and Section 2 of the Fourteenth Amendment. The Constitution, Supreme Court jurisprudence and federal law allow significant latitude to the individual states to draw their congressional and legislative districts as they see fit, as long as each district contains roughly equivalent numbers of people (see Baker v. Carr, Wesberry v. Sanders, and Reynolds v. Sims) and provides for minority representation pursuant to the Voting Rights Act. While control over redrawing district lines has been in the hands of state legislators for most of American history, a number of states, though not Arkansas, have adopted independent or bipartisan commissions for redistricting purposes in the last twenty years.

== Arkansas Board of Apportionment ==
The Arkansas Board of Apportionment was created by Amendment 1 of 1936, an initiated constitutional amendment.

== See also ==
- Elections in Arkansas
- 2020 United States census
- 2020 United States redistricting cycle
