= Kevin Penix =

American politician

Member of the Arkansas House of Representatives for the 63rd district
- In office 2003–2004
- Preceded by: David Rackley
- Succeeded by: Frank Glidewell

Personal details
- Born: May 5, 1962 Crossett, Arkansas, U.S.
- Died: April 24, 2012 (aged 49) Fort Smith, Arkansas, U.S.
- Party: Republican

Kevin Penix (May 5, 1962 – April 24, 2012) was an American politician who served in the Arkansas House of Representatives from 2003 until 2004 as a Republican. Born in Crossett, Penix lived in Fort Smith and represented Sebastian County in the House of Representatives.

In April 2003, Penix sponsored a bill which would increase the penalty for driving under the influence with a child under 16 in the car to a range of one week to one year in jail for a first offense. During his tenure, he was a member of the Arkansas Legislative Black Caucus, and he sat on the House Public Education Committee.

Penix owned and operated an Allstate Insurance agency in Little Rock. Penix was married and had two sons with his wife. He was a Southern Baptist.
