= Cregmore =

Cregmore may refer to:

- Cregmore (Lackagh parish), County Galway
- Cregmore (Ardrahan parish), County Galway
