= Ken Cowling =

American politician

Member of the Arkansas House of Representatives from the 2nd district
- In office January 13, 2003 – January 8, 2007
- Preceded by: David Hausam
- Succeeded by: Larry Cowling

Member of the Arkansas House of Representatives from the 20th district
- In office January 8, 2001 – January 13, 2003
- Preceded by: Barbara Horn
- Succeeded by: Tommy Roebuck

Personal details
- Born: September 13, 1947 Foreman, Arkansas
- Died: March 2, 2020 (aged 72) Texarkana, Arkansas
- Party: Democratic

Ken Cowling (September 13, 1947 – March 2, 2020) was an American politician who served in the Arkansas House of Representatives from 2001 to 2007.

He died on March 2, 2020, in Texarkana, Arkansas at age 72.
