= Mike Creekmore =

American politician

Member of the Arkansas House of Representatives from the 27th district
- In office January 13, 2003 – January 10, 2005
- Preceded by: Jeff Gillespie
- Succeeded by: Dawn Creekmore

Member of the Arkansas House of Representatives from the 51st district
- In office January 11, 1999 – January 13, 2003
- Preceded by: E. Ray Stalnaker
- Succeeded by: Danny Ferguson

Personal details
- Born: January 7, 1964 (age 62) East End, Arkansas
- Party: Democratic
- Spouse: Dawn Creekmore

Mike Creekmore (born January 7, 1964) is an American politician who served in the Arkansas House of Representatives from 1999 to 2005.
