= Raymond Creekmore =

American painter

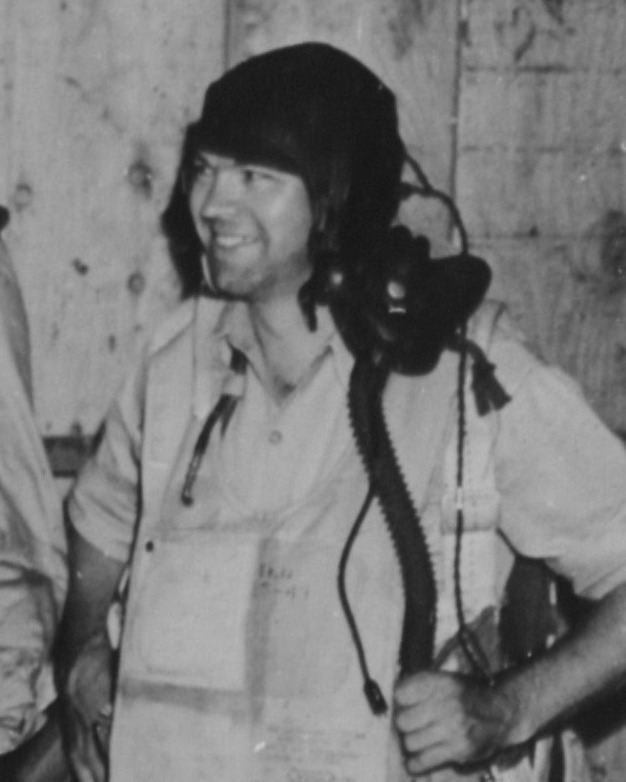
- Creekmore as a war correspondent in 1944
- Born: May 5, 1905
- Died: May 1984 (aged 78–79)
- Military career
- Branch: United States Army
- Rank: Captain

Raymond Creekmore (May 5, 1905 – May 1984) was a prolific artist, writer and sailboat designer.

Creekmore was an American artist who, in the beginning of his career, "wandered" extensively, using his experiences in observation and his direct and expressive draftsmanship as vehicles to bring the sensitivity and ways of life in foreign lands to America's local shores.

Creekmore was born in Portsmouth, Virginia. He moved to Baltimore, Maryland, graduating from the Maryland Institute School of Mechanical Arts (now "MICA") in 1930. During his days as an art student, he became friends with another student artist, Leonard Bahr and they shared a studio for a while as well as a love of sailing, and remained lifelong friends. Creekmore was an easy-going student with a great sense of humor. After graduation in 1930, he worked his way through Europe with a sketch pad, and in 1933, spent five months in Mexico. By 1936, he set out again "on a shoestring" with his sketch pad as means of support. He stayed in villages in Japan, India, Mongolia, and China, and kept illustrated journals.

Between trips, he worked as a Baltimore Evening Sun staff illustrator, with sketches of his travels and of local news reports published regularly. One such local report told of his rides in a garbage truck on their late night run through the City streets—a bit of humor on what was normally encountered in that type of business. He also won prizes for his sketches of Baltimore neighborhoods in the Evening Sun sponsored b&w sketch contests. His drawings of the Orient comprised the first one-man show at the Baltimore Museum of Art that they had displayed in 6 years. In 1937, he published in Art Instruction (a national art journal), "A Baltimore Hiker in Nippon, Becoming Acquainted With The Japanese Alps," including sketches and photographs of his trip from the previous year. And in 1938, he participated in a Courbet Symposium and illustrated a booklet for the Peabody Conservatory of Music.

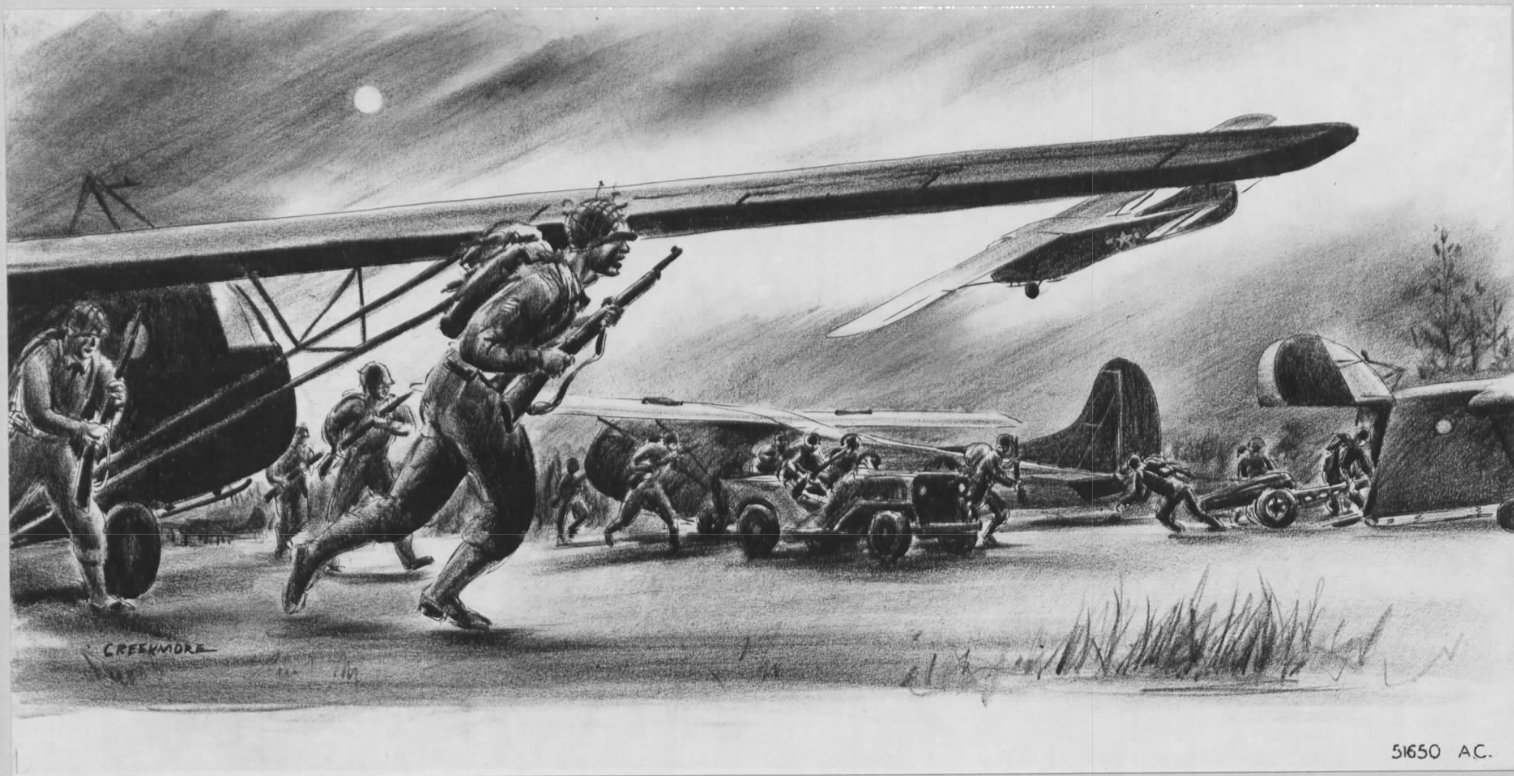
Captain Creekmore was part of the D-day invasion of France. He sketched these gliders after landing in Normandy.

Creekmore joined the Army Air Force during World War II and became a Captain. He was assigned to draw Army pilots in their varied duties including the Tokyo Superfortress raids and sketches of the Army in Guam, Puerto Rico, Greenland, the Baffin Islands, and in Newfoundland—where he slept in an igloo. He still kept a writing journal of his experiences during the war. Meanwhile, he had married and had a son. The family, at that time, lived in Mamaroneck, New York, and after the war, taught at Brooklyn's Pratt Institute.

During this time too, he also started to write and illustrate children's books, and in 1944, he co-authored a book with actor Joe E. Brown entitled "Your Kids and Mine." That was followed by his own "Lokoshi" in 1946, "Ali's Elephant" in 1949, and in 1950, the "Little Skipper" (about his family's true adventures of building their first sailboat). More books followed in 1951, when he illustrated "Rusty," by another author, and in 1954, he wrote and illustrated "Fujio," and "Little Fu" in 1947.

In 1950, Creekmore designed and built his own unique sloop on his father-in-law's property near the Magothy River in Anne Arundel Co., Maryland, after reading how to build one in a book. On a low budget and with innovative techniques, he built a 5-layered mahogany hull over a handmade mold. Eventually, that became his business producing "Creekmore" sailboats. He moved from New York to Miami and was in that business in 1959, when the Bahrs went to visit him.

Publications include the "American Artist" (1944), and the Baltimore "Evening Sun (1938, 1939, 1942, 1945, 1946)". Creekmore exhibited widely and reproductions of his drawings, books, and boat designs can be found online. The Enoch Pratt Library in Baltimore, the Peabody Conservatory, and the Maryland Historical Society hold some of the records, publicity, letters and photos of his life. Public collections of his work include: The Smithsonian American Art Museum, Univ. of Michigan Mus. of Art, Univ. of Missouri, the Mobile Mus. of Art, the Michael C. Carlos Mus. in Atlanta, and the E.L. Andersen Library at the Univ. of Minnesota.
