= Frank Glidewell =

American politician

Member of the Arkansas Senate from the 8th district
- In office August 27, 2018 – January 14, 2019
- Preceded by: Jake Files
- Succeeded by: Mathew Pitsch

Member of the Arkansas House of Representatives from the 63rd district
- In office January 10, 2005 – January 10, 2011
- Preceded by: Kevin Penix
- Succeeded by: Denny Altes

Personal details
- Born: October 8, 1944 (age 81) Lavaca, Arkansas
- Party: Republican

Frank Glidewell (born October 8, 1944) is an American politician who served in the Arkansas House of Representatives from the 63rd district from 2005 to 2011 and in the Arkansas Senate from the 8th district from 2018 to 2019. He is a Republican.
