= Bobby Glover =

Bobby L. Glover

Member of the Arkansas Senate from District 28
- In office 2003–2011

Member of the Arkansas House of Representatives
- In office 1973–2002

Mayor of Carlisle, Arkansas
- In office 1963–1972

Personal details
- Born: July 5, 1936 Carlisle, Arkansas, U.S.
- Died: October 27, 2021 (aged 85) Arkansas, U.S.
- Party: Democratic

Bobby L. Glover (July 5, 1936 – October 27, 2021) was an American politician who served as a Democratic member of the Arkansas Senate, representing District 28 from 2003 to 2011. He previously served ten terms in the Arkansas House of Representatives over fourteen years, representing parts of White, Lonoke and Prairie counties.

Glover was born in Carlisle, Arkansas, and studied accounting at LaSalle University. Before his legislative career, he served as mayor of Carlisle from 1963 to 1972. Following his Senate tenure he was appointed to the Arkansas Board of Corrections by Governor Mike Beebe in 2011, a position he held until his death.
