= Sandra Prater =

American politician

Sandra Prater (born February 6, 1955) is an American former Justice of the Peace and state legislator. She served in the Arkansas House of Representatives from 2003 to 2008. She was living in Jacksonville, Arkansas. She is the owner of Prater Auto Sales.
