= Gene Shelby =

American politician

Member of the Arkansas House of Representatives from the 25th district
- In office January 8, 2007 – January 10, 2011
- Preceded by: Bob Mathis
- Succeeded by: John Vines

Personal details
- Born: January 8, 1951 (age 75) Muskogee, Oklahoma
- Party: Democratic

Gene Shelby (born January 8, 1951) is an American politician who served in the Arkansas House of Representatives from the 25th district from 2007 to 2011.
