= Curren Everett =

American politician

Member of the Arkansas House of Representatives from the 82nd district
- In office January 10, 2005 – January 10, 2011
- Preceded by: Boyd Hickinbotham
- Succeeded by: Lori Benedict

Personal details
- Party: Democratic

Curren Everett is an American politician who served in the Arkansas House of Representatives from the 82nd district from 2005 to 2011.
