= Steve Harrelson =

American politician

Steve Harrelson (born March 3, 1974) is an American politician living in Little Rock, Arkansas. He was first elected to the Arkansas House of Representatives in 2004 and served as House Majority Leader for two terms from 2006 to 2010. He also served as chairman of the House Judiciary Committee under Speaker Robbie Wills. Harrelson was elected to the Arkansas Senate in 2010 and was defeated in 2012 by Jimmy Hickey.
