= Dawn Creekmore =

American politician

Member of the Arkansas House of Representatives from the 27th district
- In office January 10, 2005 – January 10, 2011
- Preceded by: Mike Creekmore
- Succeeded by: Andy Mayberry

Personal details
- Born: February 28, 1965 (age 61) Hensley, Arkansas
- Party: Democratic
- Spouse: Mike Creekmore

Dawn Creekmore (born February 28, 1965) is an American politician who served in the Arkansas House of Representatives from the 27th district from 2005 to 2011. She lives in Hensley, Arkansas.
