= Jake Files =

American politician

Jake C. Files

Member of the Arkansas Senate from the 8th district
- In office January 2013 – February 9, 2018
- Preceded by: Cecile Bledsoe
- Succeeded by: Frank Glidewell

Member of the Arkansas Senate from the 13th district
- In office 2011–2013
- Succeeded by: Alan Clark

Member of the Arkansas House of Representatives from the 12th district
- In office January 1999 – January 2003

Personal details
- Born: March 27, 1972 (age 54) Norman, Oklahoma, U.S.
- Party: Republican
- Spouse: Michaela Mitchell Files
- Children: Kate, Liz, and Bella Files
- Education: Ouachita Baptist University; Arkansas State University
- Occupation: Businessman

Jake C. Files (born March 27, 1972) is a Republican politician from Fort Smith, Arkansas. Files represented portions of the Arkansas River Valley in the Arkansas House of Representatives from 1999 to 2003, and in the Arkansas Senate from 2011 to 2018.

He pleaded guilty in 2018 to wire fraud, bank fraud and money laundering relating to misuse of the state's surplus money and was sentenced to 18 months in prison.

== Background ==
A native of Norman, Oklahoma, Files graduated cum laude with a bachelor's degree in accounting from Arkansas State University in Jonesboro. Previously, he attended Ouachita Baptist University in Arkadelphia. He owns FFH Construction, a general construction firm. From 1997 to 2004, he was the president and superintendent of the Fort Smith Christian School. Prior to that, he was hired to help start operations of the Baldor Electric Company plant in Ozark, Arkansas, as the accountant and materials manager. He and his wife, the former Michaela K. Mitchell (born 1977), have four children. The senator coaches Little League baseball and basketball.

== Political life ==
From 1999 to 2003, he represented District 12 in the Arkansas House of Representatives. Files was first elected to the State Senate in 2010 in District 13. His district number was switched through redistricting from District 13 to District 8, effective January 2013. His district boundaries changed to include most of the cities of Greenwood and Hackett. He served on Senate committees for Revenue & Taxation, Transportation, Technology, Legislative Affairs, Joint Budget, and Senate Efficiency. He was also a member of the Joint (House and Senate) Legislative Committee on Auditing. He was chairman of the Revenue and Taxation Committee.

== Fraud scandal ==
In early 2017, Files was accused of submitting false bids for the River Valley Sports Complex, a planned park of softball fields at Chaffee Crossing in Fort Smith. Though initially denying the charges, Files pleaded guilty to wire fraud, bank fraud and money laundering in the United States District Court for the Western District of Arkansas in January 2018. He resigned his senate seat in February.

=== Plea ===
The plea agreement says Files and Lee Webb, a member of the Sebastian County Election Commission, convinced the City of Fort Smith to appropriate $1.6 million for the project in 2014. Files then created three fictitious companies to bid for the project. He later proposed steering $150,000 of public funds from the state's General Improvement Fund (GIF) to the project. Files had control over the funds, and was chairman of the Senate Revenue and Taxation Committee. He pleaded guilty, and was sentenced to 18 months in prison and ordered to pay $83,900 in restitution.

Preceded by Cecile Bledsoe	Arkansas State Senator for District 8 (Sebastian County); 2013 – February 9, 2018	Succeeded by Frank Glidewell
Preceded by Missing	Arkansas State Senator for District 13; 2011–2013	Succeeded by Alan Clark
Preceded by Missing	Arkansas State Representative for District 12 (Fort Smith); 1999–2003	Succeeded by Missing
