= 2008 Arkansas Senate election =

18 of 35 seats in the Arkansas Senate 18 seats needed for a majority
	Majority party	Minority party
Leader	Jack Critcher (retired)	Denny Altes
Party	Democratic	Republican
Leader since	January 8, 2007
Leader's seat	17th–Batesville	13th–Fort Smith
Seats before	27	8
Seats after	27	8
Popular vote	16,561 (Note: Vote totals do not include uncontested races, which were not on the ballot)	20,253
Percentage	44.99%	55.01%
Seats up	12	6
Seats won	12	6
- Democratic hold Republican hold No election Democrats: Unopposed; Republicans: 50–60% Unopposed; No election
President Pro Tempore before election
Jack Critcher
Democratic
Elected President Pro Tempore
Bob Johnson
Democratic

Elections to the Arkansas Senate were held on November 4, 2008, to elect 18 candidates to the chamber. Members of the Arkansas Senate serve staggered four-year terms, with these seat's last elections taking place in 2004. Despite a twenty-point loss in the concurrent presidential election for Democratic nominee Barack Obama in the state, Democrats maintained their control of the state government, retaining their supermajority status in the Senate. Of the 18 seats up for election, Democrats won twelve and the Republicans six.

The vast majority of state senate seats were uncompetitive: only three had primary elections, and only the 30th district had a general election.

This election took place alongside races for U.S. President, U.S. Senate, U.S. House, state house, and numerous other state and local elections.

== Overview ==
District	Incumbent			Results
District	Senator	Party	Outcome	Results
1st	Johnny Key	Republican	Incumbent re-elected.	▌ ✓ Johnny Key (Republican) Unopposed
2nd	Randy Laverty	Democratic	Incumbent re-elected.	▌ ✓ Randy Laverty (Democratic) Unopposed
3rd	Ruth Whitaker	Republican	Incumbent re-elected.	▌ ✓ Ruth Whitaker (Republican) Unopposed
4th	Sharon Trusty	Republican	Incumbent re-elected.	▌ ✓ Sharon Trusty (Republican) Unopposed
7th	Sue Madison	Democratic	Incumbent re-elected.	▌ ✓ Sue Madison (Democratic) Unopposed
8th	Dave Bisbee	Republican	Incumbent retired. Republican hold.	▌ ✓ Cecile Bledsoe (Republican) Unopposed
9th	Kim Hendren	Republican	Incumbent re-elected.	▌ ✓ Kim Hendren (Republican) Unopposed
12th	Jack Critcher	Democratic	Incumbent retired. Democratic hold.	▌ ✓ David Wyatt (Democratic) Unopposed
17th	James Luker	Democratic	Incumbent re-elected.	Democratic primary: ▌ ✓ James Luker: 7,075 votes, 62.95%; ▌Denny Sumpter: 4,164 votes, 37.05%
20th	Jim Hill	Democratic	Incumbent retired. Democratic hold.	Democratic primary: ▌ ✓ Larry Teague: 5,496 votes, 56.75%; ▌Scott Sullivan: 4,189 votes, 43.25%
23rd	Jerry Taylor	Democratic	Incumbent re-elected.	▌ ✓ Jerry Taylor (Democratic) Unopposed
24th	Jimmy Jeffress	Democratic	Incumbent re-elected.	▌ ✓ Jimmy Jeffress (Democratic) Unopposed
25th	Gene Jeffress	Democratic	Incumbent re-elected.	▌ ✓ Gene Jeffress (Democratic) Unopposed
26th	Percy Malone	Democratic	Incumbent re-elected.	▌ ✓ Percy Malone (Democratic) Unopposed
30th	Gilbert Baker	Republican	Incumbent re-elected.	▌ ✓ Gilbert Baker (Republican) 20,253 votes, 55.01%; ▌Joe White (Democratic) 16,561 votes, 44.99%
31st	Mary Anne Salmon	Democratic	Incumbent re-elected.	▌ ✓ Mary Anne Salmon (Democratic) Unopposed
32nd	Jim Argue	Democratic	Incumbent retired. Democratic hold.	▌ ✓ David Johnson (Democratic) Unopposed
33rd	Irma Hunter Brown	Democratic	Incumbent lost renomination. Democratic hold.	Democratic primary: ▌ ✓ Joyce Elliott: 3,084 votes, 58.51%; ▌Irma Hunter Brown: 2,187 votes, 41.49%
