= Bookout =

Bookout is a surname, and may refer to:

- Billy Bookout (1932–2008), American football player and coach
- Jerry Bookout (1933–2006), American politician
- Kevin Bookout (born 1983), American basketball player
- Paul Bookout (born 1962), American politician
- Phyllis Bookout, (1935–1964), All-American Girls Professional Baseball League player

== See also ==
- Maci Bookout, fictional character in the Teen Mom reality series
