= Arkansas's 1st Senate district =

Arkansas's 1st State Senate district
- District boundaries effective January 9, 2023
Senator
Ben Gilmore; R–Crossett
- Demographics: 67.10% White; 24.43% Black; 5.57% Hispanic
- Population (2020): 83,996 −2,048 (−2.38%) deviation from target pop.

Arkansas's 1st Senate district is one of 35 districts in the Arkansas Senate. It has been represented by Republican Ben Gilmore since 2023. Prior to redistricting the district was represented by Republican Bart Hester.

== Federal and statewide office results ==
Year	Office	Results
2020	President	Trump 67.7 – 30.0%
2020	U.S. Senate	Cotton 73.2 – 26.8%
2018	Governor	Hutchinson 69.1 – 28.7%
2016	President	Trump 63.9 – 32.2%
2012	President	Romney 62.4 – 37.6%
2008	President	McCain 60.6 – 36.3%

== 2022–present ==
=== Redistricting ===
Prior to the 2020 redistricting cycle, the first Senate district was located in Northwest Arkansas. After the 2020 Census, Senate districts were renumbered, with incumbent Republican Bart Hester being redistricted to the new 33rd district. Ben Gilmore of the old 26th district was moved to the new 1st district. Since January 9, 2023, the district has contained the entirety of the counties of Ashley, Bradley, Chicot, and Cleveland, as well as portions of Drew, Grant, Jefferson, and Lincoln.

=== Election results ===
==== 2024 ====
2024 Arkansas Senate election, 1st district
Primary election
Party	Candidate	Votes	%
Republican	Ben Gilmore (incumbent)	Unopposed	
General election
Republican	Ben Gilmore (incumbent)	22,933	77.36%
Libertarian	Asher Williams	6,713	22.64%
Total votes		29,646	100.00%
Republican hold			

==== 2022 ====
2022 Arkansas Senate election, 1st district
Primary election
Party	Candidate	Votes	%
Republican	Ben Gilmore (incumbent)	Unopposed	
General election
Republican	Ben Gilmore (incumbent)	21,580	100.00%
Total votes		21,580	100.00%
Republican hold			

== 2012–2022 ==
=== Redistricting ===
Prior to the 2010 redistricting cycle, the first Senate district was located in northern Arkansas. After the 2010 Census, Senate districts were renumbered, with incumbent Republican Johnny Key being redistricted to the new 17th district. James Luker of the old 17th district was moved to the 1st district, but was term-limited. From January 2013 to January 9, 2023, the district contained portions of the counties of Benton and Washington.

=== Election results ===
==== 2020 ====
2020 Arkansas Senate election, 1st district
Primary election
Party	Candidate	Votes	%
Republican	Bart Hester (incumbent)	Unopposed	
General election
Republican	Bart Hester (incumbent)	36,778	64.94%
Democratic	Ronetta J. Francis	19,855	35.06%
Total votes		56,633	100.00%
Republican hold			

==== 2016 ====
2016 Arkansas Senate election, 1st district
Primary election
Party	Candidate	Votes	%
Republican	Bart Hester (incumbent)	Unopposed	
General election
Republican	Bart Hester (incumbent)	Unopposed	
Republican hold			

==== 2012 ====
2012 Arkansas Senate election, 1st district
Primary election
Party	Candidate	Votes	%
Republican	Bart Hester	4,506	53.80%
Republican	Tim Summers	3,869	46.20%
Total votes		8,375	100.00%
General election
Republican	Bart Hester	Unopposed	
Republican gain from Democratic			

== 2002–2012 ==
=== Redistricting ===
From January 2003 to January 2013, the district contained the entirety of the counties of Baxter and Marion in addition to portions of Boone.

=== Election results ===
==== 2008 ====
2008 Arkansas Senate election, 1st district
Primary election
Party	Candidate	Votes	%
Republican	Johnny Key	Unopposed	
General election
Republican	Johnny Key	Unopposed	
Republican hold			

==== 2004 ====
2004 Arkansas Senate election, 1st district
Primary election
Party	Candidate	Votes	%
Republican	Shawn Womack (incumbent)	Unopposed	
General election
Republican	Shawn Womack (incumbent)	Unopposed	
Republican hold			

==== 2002 ====
2002 Arkansas Senate election, 1st district
Primary election
Party	Candidate	Votes	%
Democratic	Joe Dillard	Unopposed	
Republican	Shawn Womack	Unopposed	
General election
Republican	Shawn Womack	14,396	53.39%
Democratic	Joe Dillard	12,567	46.61%
Total votes		26,963	100.00%
