= Jay Bradford =

American insurance businessman and politician

Member of the Arkansas House of Representatives
- In office January 8, 2001 – January 8, 2007
- Preceded by: Pat Pappas
- Succeeded by: Toni Bradford
- Constituency: 71st district (2001–2003); 18th district (2003–2007)

President pro tempore of the Arkansas Senate
- In office January 11, 1999 – January 8, 2001
- Preceded by: Wayne Dowd
- Succeeded by: Mike Beebe

Member of the Arkansas Senate
- In office January 10, 1983 – January 8, 2001
- Preceded by: Morrell Gathright
- Succeeded by: Brenda Gullett
- Constituency: 28th district (1983–1993); 9th district (1993–2001)

Personal details
- Born: Jacobs Turner Bradford; April 30, 1940 (age 86) Little Rock, Arkansas, U.S.
- Resting place: Pine Bluff, Arkansas, U.S.
- Party: Democratic
- Spouse: Anne T. Bradford
- Children: 1
- Education: Subiaco Academy; Henderson State University
- Profession: Politician, insurance businessman

Jacobs Turner "Jay" Bradford (born April 30, 1940) is an insurance businessman and politician in Arkansas. He served in the Arkansas Senate 1983-2000 serving as President of the Arkansas Senate 1999-2000 and then served in the Arkansas House of Representatives from 2000 until 2007.

== Biography ==
Bradford was born April 30, 1940 Little Rock, Arkansas to J. Turner Bradford and Chrystal Jacobs Bradford and was one of four children. When he was eight he and his siblings moved to live with relatives in Paris, Arkansas after his mother died. He was educated in the Subiaco Academy followed by Henderson State University where obtained a bachelor's degree in economics and psychology in 1963.

He worked in insurance and was the founder and chairman of the First Arkansas Insurance Group as well as being president of the Independent Insurance Agents of Arkansas.

Bradford started his political career as an alderman in Pine Bluff, Arkansas. Then he ran for a seat in the Arkansas Senate as a Democrat in 1982 and won, a position he would serve from 1983 to 2000 before being term limited out. Bill Clinton nominated Bradford as chairman of the Democratic Party in 1889 when Skip Rutherford resigned but in February the next year Bradford resigned to avoid a lawsuit for serving a dual role. In his final years in the senate he served as President of the Arkansas Senate in 1999/2000. He then served in the Arkansas House after running unopposed serving from 2000 until 2007. He has also been appointed as a state official and served as a state commissioner of insurance.

After his political career he returned to the insurance business. He is married to Anne T. Bradford, they have a child, and live in Pine Bluff.
