= Senator Bookout =

Senator Bookout may refer to:

- Jerry Bookout (1933–2006), Arkansas State Senate
- Paul Bookout (born 1962), Arkansas State Senate
