= Senator Cash =

Senator Cash may refer to:

- Claud Cash (1935–2004), Arkansas State Senate
- Wilbur J. Cash (politician) (1887–1956), Illinois State Senate
- William Thomas Cash (1878–1951), Florida State Senate
