= Morrell Gathright =

American politician (1919–2014)

Member of the Arkansas Senate
- In office January 12, 1953 – January 10, 1983
- Preceded by: James T. Wimberly
- Succeeded by: Jay Bradford
- Constituency: 20th district (1953–1973); 24th district (1973–1983)

President pro tempore of the Arkansas Senate
- In office January 13, 1969 – January 11, 1971
- Preceded by: Q. Byrum Hurst Sr.
- Succeeded by: Olen Hendrix

Member of the Arkansas House of Representatives from Jefferson County
- In office January 10, 1949 – January 12, 1953
- Succeeded by: Sam M. Levine

Personal details
- Born: Murphy Morrell Gathright; March 14, 1919 Pine Bluff, Arkansas, U.S.
- Died: October 7, 2014 (aged 95) Pine Bluff, Arkansas, U.S.
- Party: Democratic
- Spouse: Alice Purnell
- Children: 2
- Education: University of Arkansas (MBA, LLB)

Military service
- Branch/service: United States Army
- Battles/wars: World War II

Murphy Morrell Gathright (March 14, 1919 – October 7, 2014) was a state legislator, businessman, and lawyer in Arkansas. He served in the Arkansas House of Representatives and the Arkansas Senate, including as President of the Arkansas Senate. The Arkansas Senate has a collection of photographs including several of him.

He graduated from the University of Arkansas at Fayetteville with an MBA and from The University of Arkansas Law School. He served in World War II.

Gathright first served in the Arkansas House of Representatives from 1949 until 1951 he then served in the Arkansas Senate from 1952 until 1982, including his term as president 1969 until 1970.

He owned Gathright Van & Storage Co., which his father P. D. Gathright Sr. founded in 1927. He died October 7, 2014, aged 95 and was survived by his wife Alice Purnell Gathright. They had a son and daughter as well as numerous grandchildren.
