= 2004 United States House of Representatives elections in Arkansas =

- November 2, 2004

All 4 Arkansas seats to the United States House of Representatives
	Majority party	Minority party
Party	Democratic	Republican
Last election	3	1
Seats won	3	1
Seat change	Steady	Steady

Democratic
50–60%
60–70%
70–80%
80–90%
90–100%
Republican
40–50%
50–60%
60–70%

The United States House of Representatives elections of 2004 in Arkansas occurred on November 2, 2004 to elect the members of the State of Arkansas's delegation to the United States House of Representatives. Arkansas had four seats in the House, apportioned according to the 2000 United States census.

These elections were held concurrently with the United States presidential election of 2004, United States Senate elections of 2004 (including one in Arkansas), the United States House elections in other states, and various state and local elections.

== Overview ==
United States House of Representatives elections in Arkansas, 2004
Party	Votes	Percentage	Seats before	Seats after	+/–
Democratic	426,380*	65.7%*	3	3	±0
Republican	357,840	33.7%	1	1	±0
Independents	7,020	0.7%	0	0	
Totals	791,240*	100.00%	4	4	-

(*Given Representative Mike Ross ran unopposed [earning 100% by default] the Secretary of State of Arkansas's election division recorded no voting data for the Fourth Congressional District election. Thus vote totals for Democratic candidates and all candidates do not account for Ross's votes earned.)

== Results ==
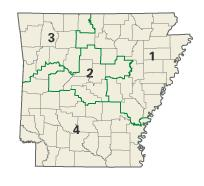
Arkansas congressional districts in the 2004 elections

District	Incumbent	Party	First elected	Result	Candidates
Arkansas 1	Marion Berry	Democratic	1996	Re-elected	Marion Berry (D) 66.6% Vernon Humphrey (R) 33.4%
Arkansas 2	Vic Snyder	Democratic	1996	Re-elected	Vic Snyder (D) 58.2% Marvin Parks (R) 41.8%
Arkansas 3	John Boozman	Republican	2001	Re-elected	John Boozman (R) 59.3% Jan Judy (D) 38.1% Dale Morfey (I) 2.6%
Arkansas 4	Mike Ross	Democratic	2000	Re-elected	Mike Ross (D) unopposed (100%)

== District 1 ==
2004 Arkansas's 1st congressional district election
- November 2, 2004
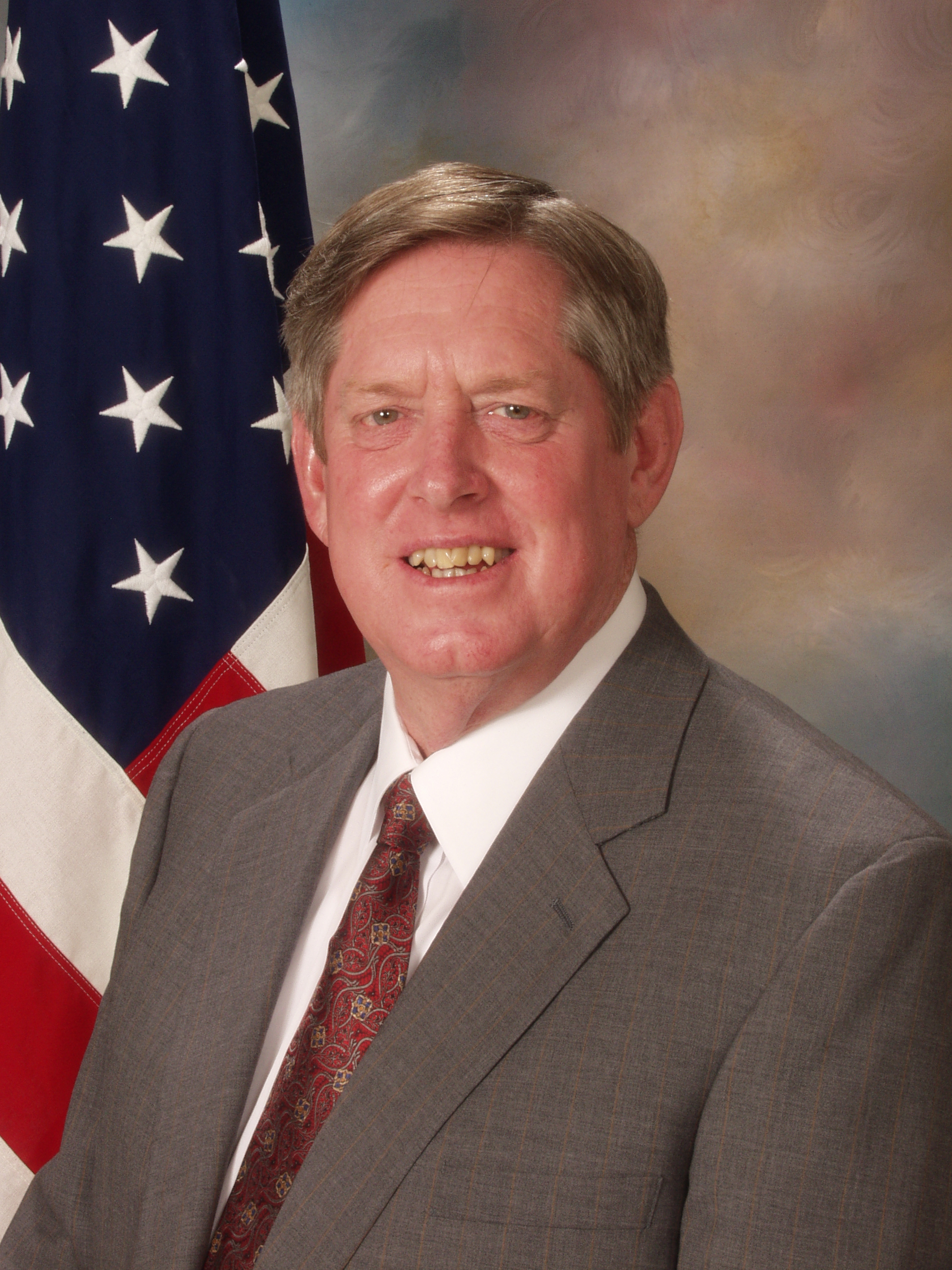

Nominee	Marion Berry	Vernon Humphrey
Party	Democratic	Republican
Popular vote	162,388	81,556
Percentage	66.6%	33.4%
U.S. Representative before election
Marion Berry
Democratic
Elected U.S. Representative
Marion Berry
Democratic

Incumbent Democrat Marion Berry, who was first elected in 1996, ran for re-election. Berry was re-elected with 66.6% of the vote.

=== General election ===
==== Results ====
Arkansas's 1st congressional district election, 2004
Party	Candidate	Votes	%
Democratic	Marion Berry (incumbent)	162,388	66.6
Republican	Vernon Humphrey	81,556	33.4
Total votes		243,944	100.0
Democratic hold			

== District 2 ==
2004 Arkansas's 2nd congressional district election
- November 2, 2004
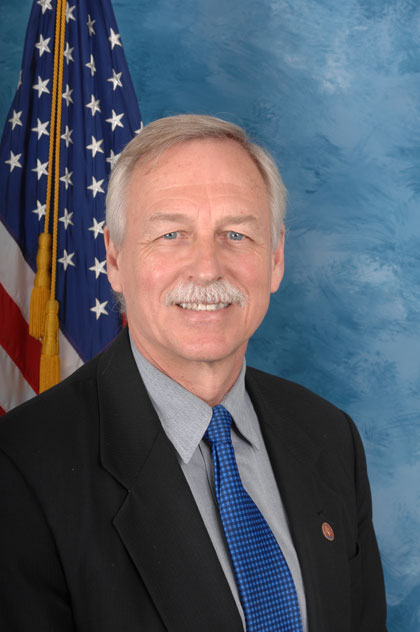

Nominee	Vic Snyder	Marvin Parks
Party	Democratic	Republican
Popular vote	160,834	115,655
Percentage	58.2%	41.8%
U.S. Representative before election
Vic Snyder
Democratic
Elected U.S. Representative
Vic Snyder
Democratic

Incumbent Democrat Vic Snyder, who was first elected in 1996, ran for re-election. Snyder was re-elected with 58.2% of the vote.

=== General election ===
==== Results ====
Arkansas's 2nd congressional district election, 2004
Party	Candidate	Votes	%
Democratic	Vic Snyder (incumbent)	160,834	58.2
Republican	Marvin Parks	115,655	41.8
Write-In	William Gabriel	4	0.0
Total votes		276,493	100.0
Democratic hold			

== District 3 ==
2004 Arkansas's 3rd congressional district election
- November 2, 2004
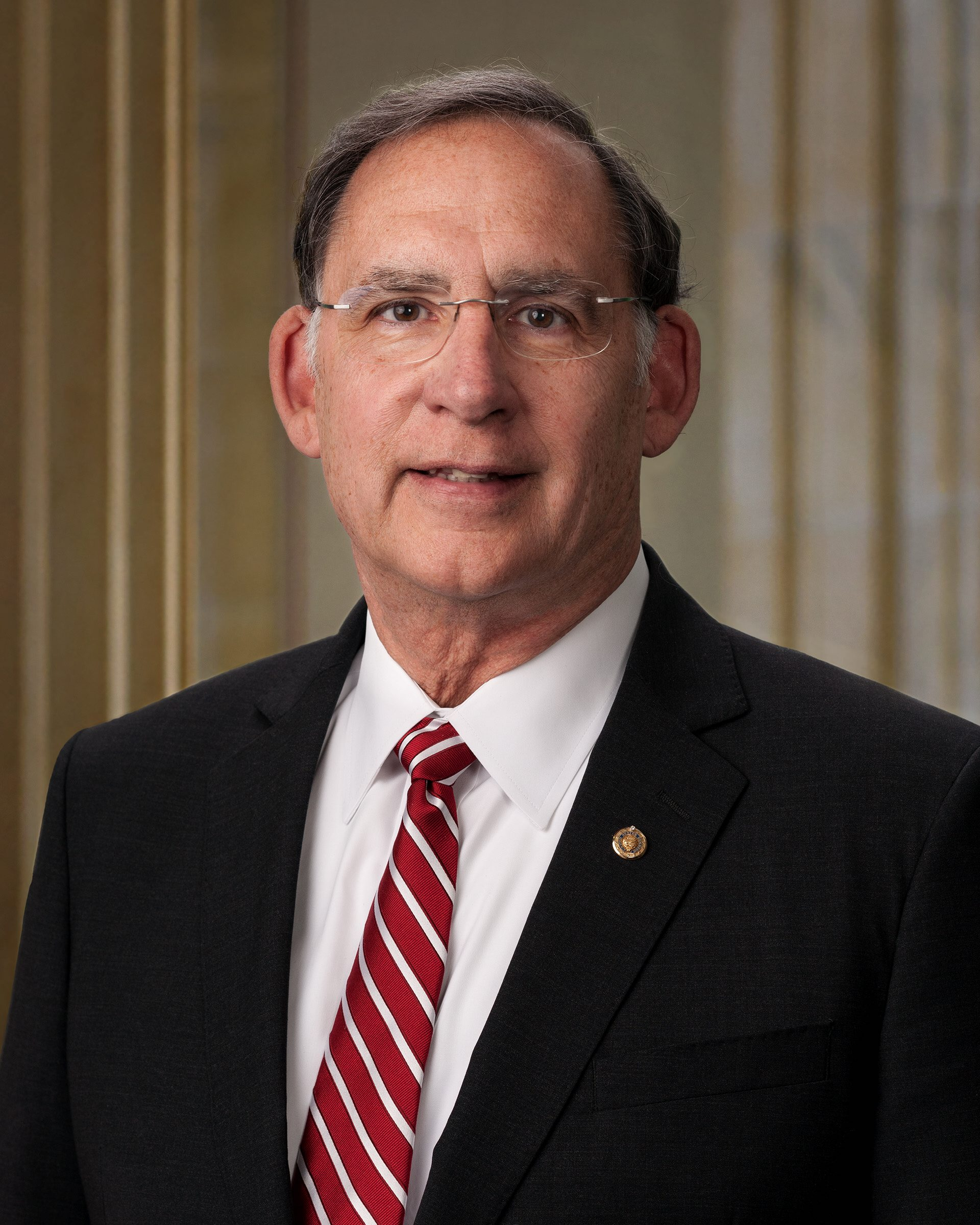

Nominee	John Boozman	Jan Judy
Party	Republican	Democratic
Popular vote	160,629	103,158
Percentage	59.3%	38.1%
U.S. Representative before election
John Boozman
Republican
Elected U.S. Representative
John Boozman
Republican

Incumbent Republican John Boozman, who was first elected in 2001, ran for re-election. Boozman was re-elected with 59.3% of the vote.

=== General election ===
==== Results ====
Arkansas's 3rd congressional district election, 2004
Party	Candidate	Votes	%
Republican	John Boozman (incumbent)	160,629	59.3
Democratic	Jan Judy	103,158	38.1
Independent	Dale Morfey	7,016	2.6
Total votes		270,803	100.0
Republican hold			
