= Julian Bailey =

Julian Bailey may refer to:

- Julian T. Bailey (born 1859), American lawyer, writer and educator
- Julian Bailey (racing driver) (born 1961), British racing driver
- Julian Bailey (actor) (born 1977), Canadian actor
- Julian Bailey (rugby league) (born 1978), Australian rugby player
