= Senator Bledsoe (disambiguation) =

Jesse Bledsoe (1776–1836) was a U.S. Senator from Kentucky from 1813 to 1814, and also served in the Kentucky State Senate; Senator Bledsoe may also refer to:

- Amanda Mays Bledsoe (born 1978), Kentucky State Senate
- Anthony Bledsoe (1733–1788), North Carolina State Senate and Tennessee State Senate
- Cecile Bledsoe (born 1944), Arkansas State Senate
- William H. Bledsoe (1869–1936), Texas State Senate
