= Shorter College =

Shorter College may refer to:

- Shorter College (Arkansas), a junior college in Little Rock, Arkansas
- Shorter University, formerly known as Shorter College, a liberal arts college in Rome, Georgia
