= Paul Benham =

Arkansas state legislator

Paul Burrus Benham Jr. (February 27, 1921 - November 22, 1991) was a state legislator from Arkansas. He was born in Memphis, Tennessee and studied at Vanderbilt University. He served as president of the Mississippi River Railway Commission.

He lived in Marianna, Arkansas. He was elected October 2, 1973 to fill a vacancy and served several terms in the Arkansas Senate. He was a Democrat. He also served as President of the Arkansas Senate in 1986.

Paul Benham III is a lawyer in Arkansas.
