= Senator Salmon =

Senator Salmon may refer to:

- Mary Anne Salmon (born 1939), Arkansas State Senate
- Matt Salmon (born 1958), Arizona State Senate

== See also ==
- Jesse Salomon (born 1976), Washington State Senate
