= Morriss Henry =

American politician (1931–2024)

Member of the Arkansas Senate
- In office January 11, 1971 – January 14, 1985
- Preceded by: Clifton Wade
- Succeeded by: David R. Malone
- Constituency: 2nd district (1971–1973); 7th district (1973–1983); 6th district (1983–1985)

Member of the Arkansas House of Representatives from the 7th district
- In office January 9, 1967 – January 11, 1971 Serving with Charles Stewart, Charles Davis
- Succeeded by: Hugh Kincaid

Personal details
- Born: Morriss Murphey Henry; December 13, 1931 Cincinnati, Ohio, U.S.
- Died: September 8, 2024 (aged 92)
- Party: Democratic
- Occupation: ophthalmologist

Military service
- Branch/service: United States Air Force
- Years of service: 1959–1961
- Rank: Captain

Morriss Murphey Henry (December 13, 1931 – September 8, 2024) was an American politician who served in the Arkansas House of Representatives and Arkansas Senate from 1967 to 1984. Educated at Hendrix College, the University of Tennessee, and Harvard University, he became an ophthalmologist. He was a Democrat.

Henry died on September 8, 2024, at the age of 92.
