= J. B. Judkins =

J. B. Judkins may refer to:

- J. B. Judkins (politician), lawyer and state senator in Arkansas
- John B. Judkins Company, carriage and automobile body manufacturing company
