= Laverty =

Laverty is an Irish surname that may refer to

- Bernard MacLaverty (born 1942), Northern Irish writer of fiction
- Colin Laverty (1937–2013), Australian medical practitioner
- Conor Laverty, Irish Gaelic footballer
- Eugene Laverty (born 1986), Irish motorcycle road racer
- Jan Laverty Jones (born 1949), American businesswoman and politician
- John Laverty (born 1982), Irish motorcycle road racer, brother of Eugene and Michael
- Maura Laverty (1907–1966), Irish author, journalist and broadcaster
- Michael Laverty (born 1981), Irish motorcycle road racer, brother of Eugene and John
- Michael McLaverty (1904–1992), Irish writer of novels and short stories
- Paul Laverty (born 1957), Scottish lawyer and scriptwriter
- Peter Laverty (1926–2013), British-Australian painter, print maker, art educator and gallery director
- Randy Laverty (born 1953), American politician

== See also ==
- Lafferty
