= Clifton Wade =

American lawyer and politician (1910–1974)

Member of the Arkansas Senate from the 2nd district
- In office January 10, 1955 – January 11, 1971
- Preceded by: John W. Cloer
- Succeeded by: Morriss Henry

President pro tempore of the Arkansas Senate
- In office January 9, 1961 – January 14, 1963
- Preceded by: Roy L. Riales Sr.
- Succeeded by: Max Howell

Member of the Arkansas House of Representatives from Washington County
- In office January 13, 1947 – January 10, 1955
- Succeeded by: Charles Stewart

Personal details
- Born: George Clifton Wade; January 25, 1910 Arkansas City, Arkansas, U.S.
- Died: November 1, 1974 (aged 64) Fayetteville, Arkansas, U.S.
- Resting place: Fairview Garden
- Party: Democratic
- Occupation: Lawyer; politician

Military service
- Branch/service: United States Army; Army Air Forces
- Rank: Major
- Battles/wars: World War II

George Clifton Wade (January 25, 1910 – November 1, 1974) was a lawyer and politician who served in the Arkansas House of Representatives and the Arkansas Senate.

He was born January 25, 1910 in Arkansas City and obtained BA and LLB degrees from the University of Arkansas. Wade worked as a lawyer for over 40 years in Fayetteville and was a senior partner in the firm Wade, McAllister, Wade and Burke.

He served in the United States Air Force during World War II with the rank of major.

Wade served in the Arkansas House of Representatives from 1947 to 1954, and the Arkansas Senate from 1955 until 1970 as a Democrat. He served as President of the Arkansas Senate in the 1961 to 1962 session.

He was engaged with the Fayetteville community being involved with civic, church and school matters. For over fifty years he was a member of the Central United Methodist Church. He was referred to as Clifton "Deacon" Wade both in records of the Arkansas Senate such as in a photo from 1965 as well as in the newspapers.

Wade died November 1, 1974 at the Washington Regional Hospital in Fayetteville aged 64, and was survived by wife Vera and two children. He was buried in Fairview Garden in Fayetteville.
