= Senator Mahoney =

Senator Mahoney may refer to:

- Eugene T. Mahoney (1928–2004), Nebraska State Senate
- Francis J. Mahoney (1897–1956), New York State Senate
- John Mahoney (Ohio politician) (1949–2011), Ohio State Senate
- Margaret A. Mahoney (1893–1981), Ohio State Senate
- Walter J. Mahoney (1908–1982), New York State Senate
- W. P. Mahoney (1882–1967), Arizona State Senate

== See also ==
- William Mahone (1826–1895), U.S. Senator from Virginia from 1881 to 1887
- Jodie Mahony (1939–2009), Arkansas State Senate
- Joseph C. O'Mahoney (1884–1962), U.S. Senator from Wyoming from 1934 to 1953 and from 1954 to 1961
