= Senator Dowd =

Senator Dowd may refer to:

- David W. Dowd (1921–1975), New Jersey State Senate
- Wayne Dowd (1941–2016), Arkansas State Senate
