= Senator Canada =

Senator Canada may refer to:

- A. Joe Canada Jr. (born 1939), Virginia State Senate
- Bud Canada (1925–2009), Arkansas State Senate
