= President of the Arkansas Senate =

Arkansas head of senate

The president pro tempore of the Arkansas Senate is the state senator in the Arkansas Senate elected by their fellow senators as the body's leader. They preside over the senate and lead negotiations with the Arkansas House of Representatives. Presidents of the Arkansas Senate typically serve for one term.

Republicans went more than a century without a president pro tempore in the Arkansas Senate.

== List ==
Senator	Term		Notes	Ref.
Senator	Start	End	Notes	Ref.
Sam C. Roane	1837	1838	(Note: Served as president of the Second Territorial Legislature's Council, October 1–24, 1821, in Little Rock. He also served as a judge in Jefferson County.)	
Mark W. Izard	1838	1838		
Mark W. Izard	1840	1840		
Samuel Adams	1842	1843		
John Williamson	1844	1845		
William K. Sebastian	1846	1846		
R. C. Byrd	1848	1849		
John R. Hampton	1850	1851		
Thomas B. Hanly	November 1, 1852	January 12, 1853		
B. C. Hanley	November 6, 1854	January 22, 1855		
J. R. Hampton	November 3, 1856	January 15, 1857		
Thomas Fletcher	November 1, 1858	February 21, 1859		
Thomas Fletcher	November 5, 1860	January 21, 1861		
Thomas Fletcher; J. R. Hampton	November 5, 1862	December 1, 1862	(Note: Hampton took over when Fletcher became governor after H. M. Rector resigned.)	
Thomas Fletcher	September 22, 1864	October 2, 1864	(Note: Confederate General Assembly in Washington, D.C.)	
C. C. Bliss	April 11, 1864	June 2, 1864	(Note: Also served during special sessions November 7, 1864 – January 2, 1865 and April 3, 1865 – April 22, 1865.)	
Andrew Hunter	November 5, 1866	March 23, 1867		
J. M. Johnson	April 2, 1868	July 23, 1868	(Note: Also served during special session November 17, 1868 – April 10, 1869.)	
J. M. Johnson	January 2, 1871	March 25, 1871		
V. V. Smith	January 6, 1873	April 25, 1873	(Note: Also served during extraordinary session May 11, 1874 – May 28, 1874.)	
Bradley Bunch	November 10, 1874	December 10, 1875	(Note: Served November 10, 1874 – March 5, 1875 and November 1, 1875 – December 10, 1875.)	
James K. Jones	January 8, 1877	March 8, 1877		
Matthew McClintock Duffie	January 13, 1879	March 13, 1879		
H. C. Tipton	January 8, 1881	March 19, 1881		
J. B. Judkins	January 8, 1883	March 28, 1883		
R. B. Weaver	January 12, 1885	March 18, 1885		
D. E. Barker	January 10, 1887	March 31, 1887		
W. S. Hanna	January 10, 1889	March 31, 1889		
James P. Clarke	January 12, 1891	April 3, 1891		
E. B. Kinsworthy	January 9, 1893	April 8, 1893		
Gibson Witt	January 14, 1895	April 10, 1895		
William L. Moose	January 11, 1897	June 16, 1897	(Note: Served January 11 – March 11, 1897 and during special session April 26 – June 16, 1897.)	
M. J. Manning	January 9, 1899	April 19, 1899		
Robert J. Wilson	January 14, 1901	May 4, 1901		
Joseph L. Short	January 12, 1903	April 30, 1903		
Alonzo W. Covington	January 9, 1905	May 4, 1905		
John I Moore	January 14, 1907	May 14, 1907		
Jesse M. Martin	January 11, 1909	May 12, 1909		
Kemp Toney	1911	1911	(Note: Also served as a Speaker of the Arkansas House of Representatives.)	
J. M. Futrell	1913	1913		
L. B. Kendall	1915	1915		
John Moncrief	1917	1917		
Ben E. McFarrin	1919	1919		
G. Otis Bogle	1921	1921		
R. K. Mason	1923	1923		
S. B. McCall	1925	1925		
Freed Hutto	1927	1927		
Claude A. Rankin	1929	1929		
Ned A. Stewart	1931	1931		
William F. Norrell	1933	1935		
F. S. Armstrong	1937	1937		
Roy Milum	1939	1939		
W. B. Smith	1941	1941		
General Washington Lookadoo	1943	1943		
L. T. Barnett	1945	1945		
Clyde E. Byrd	1947	1947		
James Orville Cheney	1949	1949		
Ellis M. Fagan	1951	1951		
Russell Elrod	1953	1953		
Lawrence Blackwell	1955	1955		
J. Lee Bearden	1957	1957		
Roy L. Riales Sr.	1959	1959		
George Clifton Wade	1961	1961		
Max Howell	1963	1963		
Fred H. Stafford	1965	1965		
Q. Byrum Hurst Sr.	1967	1967		
Morrell Gathright	1969	1970		
Olen Hendrix	1971	1971		
Clarence E. Bell	1973	1973		
Robert Harvey	1975	1975		
W. K. Ingram	1977	1977		
Knox Nelson	1979	1979		
Ben Allen	1981	1981		
W. D. Moore	1983	1983		
John Bearden	1985	1985		
Paul Benham Jr.	1986	1986		
Nick Wilson	1987	1987		
Bud Canada	1989	1989		
Jerry Bookout	1991	1991		
Jerry D. Jewell	1993	1993		
Stanley Russ	1995	1995		
Wayne Dowd	1997	1997		
Jay Bradford	1999	2000		
Mike Beebe	2001	2001		
Jim Hill	2003	2003		
Jim Argue	2005	2005		
Jack Critcher	2007	2007		
Bob Johnson	2009	2009		
Paul Bookout	2011	2011		
Michael Lamoureux	2013	2014		
Jonathan Dismang	2015	2018		
Jim Hendren	2019	2020		
Jimmy Hickey Jr.	2021	2021		
Bart Hester	2023	2023		
Bart Hester	2025	2025		
Source: Arkansas Senate

== See also ==
- List of Arkansas General Assemblies
