= Jon Hubbard =

American politician

Member of the Arkansas House of Representatives from the 75th district
- In office January 10, 2011 – January 2013
- Preceded by: Joan Cash
- Succeeded by: Harold Copenhaver

Personal details
- Born: December 12, 1946 (age 79) Camden, Arkansas
- Party: Republican
- Education: Ouachita Baptist University
- Profession: Educator and insurance agent

Jon Michael Hubbard (born December 12, 1946) is a Republican former member of the Arkansas House of Representatives for District 75 in Jonesboro in Craighead County in eastern Arkansas.

== Early life ==
Hubbard was raised in North Little Rock and graduated from North Little Rock High School in 1964. He attended Arkansas State Teachers College (now University of Central Arkansas) in Conway, Arkansas and served in the United States Air Force for two years. He received his bachelor's degree from Ouachita Baptist University in 1968.

== Career ==
Hubbard defeated incumbent Joan Cash, a Democrat, in the 2010 elections.

In 2009, Hubbard published a book titled Letters to the Editor: Confessions of a Frustrated Conservative, in which he said "the institution of slavery that the black race has long believed to be an abomination upon its people may actually have been a blessing in disguise," that black people don't "appreciate the value of a good education", and that in the future immigration, both legal and illegal, must lead to "planned wars or extermination" which would be "as necessary as eating and breathing".

In 2012, Hubbard won the Republican primary in District 58, rather than District 75. However, he was defeated in the general election by Democrat Harold Copenhaver.

== Personal life ==
Hubbard was a coach at Forest Heights Junior High School in Little Rock, Arkansas for two years and Greenbrier High School in Tennessee for two years. Afterwards, he started in the insurance business in 1974 at American Fidelity Insurance Company and then Prudential Insurance Company. From 1991 to 1995, he was a teacher and coach at Walnut Ridge High School in Walnut Ridge, Arkansas. He then worked as owner/agent of Arkansas First Stop Insurance, Inc., from 1995 to 2006. Since 2006, he has been a marketing representative for Equity Insurance Company. He worked as an insurance agent until 1991.

Hubbard survived a heart attack in 2011.

Preceded by Joan Cash	Arkansas State Representative for District 75 (Craighead County); 2011–2013	Succeeded by Harold Copenhaver (in revised District 58)
