= Q. Byrum Hurst Sr. =

American politician (1918–2006)

Q. Byrum Hurst

Member of the Arkansas Senate
- In office January 8, 1951 – January 8, 1973
- Preceded by: Ernest Maner
- Succeeded by: Bud Canada
- Constituency: 14th district (1951–1953); 11th district (1953–1967); 7th district (1967–1973)

President pro tempore of the Arkansas Senate
- In office January 9, 1967 – January 13, 1969
- Preceded by: Fred H. Stafford
- Succeeded by: Morrell Gathright

Personal details
- Born: Quincy Byrum Hurst; September 21, 1918; Hot Springs, Arkansas, U.S.
- Died: December 4, 2006 (aged 88); Hot Springs, Arkansas, U.S.
- Political party: Democratic
- Spouse: Hazel Earline Barham
- Children: 4, including Q. Byrum Jr.
- Occupation: Lawyer; banker; politician

Military service
- Branch/service: United States Army
- Battles/wars: World War II

Quincy Byrum Hurst (September 21, 1918 – December 4, 2006) was an American lawyer, judge, banker, and state legislator in Arkansas. He served in the Arkansas Senate for 22 years, including a term as president pro tempore of that body. He joined the Army in 1943 and later served as judge in Garland County. He ran for Governor of Arkansas in 1972. He was a member of the Democratic Party. He advocated for the legalization of gambling in Hot Springs, Arkansas. Lawyer and politician Q. Byrum Hurst Jr. is his son.

Hurst was convicted of misusing bank funds in Missouri and Arkansas in 1974 and was sentenced to one year in prison. He was friends with Owney Madden who helped him get out of a tax evasion charge. He died in Hot Springs on December 4, 2006.
