= Marvin Parks =

American politician

Member of the Arkansas House of Representatives from the 46th district
- In office January 13, 2003 – January 10, 2005
- Preceded by: Shane Broadway
- Succeeded by: Robbie Wills

Member of the Arkansas House of Representatives from the 44th district
- In office January 11, 1999 – January 13, 2003
- Preceded by: Greg Wren
- Succeeded by: Will Bond

Personal details
- Born: November 3, 1960 (age 64)
- Political party: Republican

Marvin Parks (born November 3, 1960) is an American politician who served in the Arkansas House of Representatives from 1999 to 2005.
