= Fred H. Stafford =

Arkansas politician (1896–1978)

Member of the Arkansas Senate from the 24th district
- In office January 12, 1953 – January 11, 1971
- Preceded by: Walter N. Killough
- Succeeded by: Bill Bishop

President pro tempore of the Arkansas Senate
- In office January 11, 1965 – January 9, 1967
- Preceded by: Max Howell
- Succeeded by: Q. Byrum Hurst Sr.

Personal details
- Born: November 28, 1896 Detroit, Michigan, U.S.
- Died: February 23, 1978 (aged 81) Marked Tree, Arkansas, U.S.
- Resting place: Memorial Park Cemetery
- Party: Democratic
- Spouse: Eunice Pace
- Occupation: Lawyer; politician

Military service
- Branch/service: United States Army
- Battles/wars: World War I

Fred Hugh Stafford (November 28, 1896 – February 23, 1978) was a state legislator in Arkansas. He served as President of the Arkansas Senate.

Stafford lived in Marked Tree. He served in the Arkansas Senate.

Stafford died on February 23, 1978.
