= Jan Judy =

American politician (born 1946)

Member of the Arkansas House of Representatives
- In office January 11, 1999 – January 10, 2005
- Preceded by: Charles Stewart
- Succeeded by: Lindsley Smith
- Constituency: 7th district (1999‍–‍2003); 92nd district (2003‍–‍2005)

Personal details
- Born: Janice Ann Watts; December 11, 1946 (age 78); Fayetteville, Arkansas, U.S.
- Political party: Democratic
- Spouse: Darrell Judy (died 2000)
- Education: University of Arkansas (BSW)
- Occupation: Restaurateur; social worker; activist; politician

Janice Ann Judy (née Watts; born December 11, 1946) is an American former politician. A member of the Democratic Party, she served three terms in the Arkansas House of Representatives, representing a Fayetteville-based district that included the University of Arkansas. In 2004, rather than seek reelection, she entered the race for Arkansas's 3rd congressional district seat in the United States House of Representatives. In the November general election, she finished a distant second to the Republican incumbent, John Boozman.

Arkansas House of Representatives
| Preceded by Charles Stewart | Member of the Arkansas House of Representatives; 1999–2005 from the 7th district (part of Washington County), 1999–2003 from the 92nd district (part of Washington County), 2003–2005 | Succeeded by Lindsley Smith |
Party political offices
| Preceded by Mike Hathorn (2001 special) | Democratic nominee for the U.S. House of Representatives from Arkansas's 3rd congressional district 2004 | Succeeded by Woodrow Anderson |
