= Joan Cash =

American politician

Member of the Arkansas House of Representatives from the 75th district
- In office January 8, 2007 – January 10, 2011
- Preceded by: Dustin McDaniel
- Succeeded by: Jon Hubbard

Personal details
- Party: Democratic
- Spouse: Claud Cash (died 2004)
- Children: 2

Joan Sugg Cash is an American former politician, who served two terms in the Arkansas House of Representatives. The widow of former state representative and senator Claud Cash, she was defeated for reelection by Jon Hubbard in 2010.
