= Lawrence Blackwell =

American politician (died 1987)

Lawrence Blackwell (died February 23, 1987) was an American politician from Pine Bluff, Arkansas, who served in the Arkansas Senate from 1947 to 1955. He was president pro tempore of the Arkansas Senate in 1955. Blackwell helped legislate oversight of the Arkansas Highway Commission.
