= Magnolia Manor (Arkadelphia, Arkansas) =

Historic house in Arkansas, United States

- U.S. National Register of Historic Places
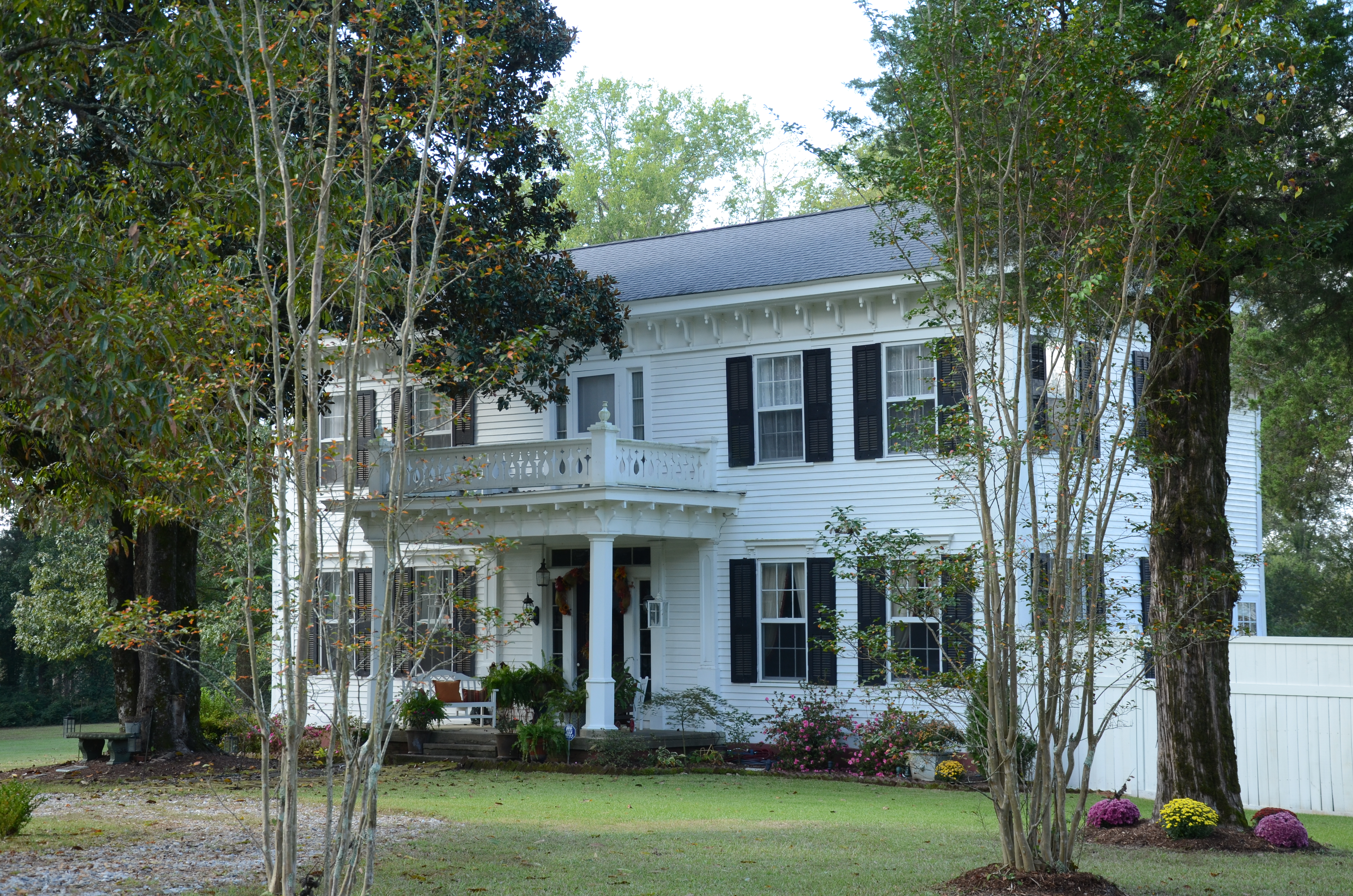

- Location within Arkansas Location within the United States
- Location: 0.6 mi. SW of jct. of I-30 and AR 51, Arkadelphia, Arkansas
- Area: 0 acres (0 ha)
- Built: 1854
- Architect: Madison Griffin
- Architectural style: Greek Revival
- NRHP reference No.: 72000200
- Added to NRHP: September 27, 1972

Magnolia Manor is a historic house on Apple Blossom Drive in Arkadelphia, Arkansas. The two story wood-frame house was built in 1854–57, and is a fine local example of Greek Revival and some Italianate styling. The house features corner pilasters, a broad eave with brackets, and a main entry on its eastern facade sheltered by a single-story porch with deck above. A secondary entry on the south side is similarly styled. The house was built by a South Carolina plantation owner, and has been owned by two state senators, Fletcher McElhannon and Olen Hendrix. The manor's lands once extended all the way to Arkansas Highway 51.

== See also ==
- National Register of Historic Places listings in Clark County, Arkansas
