= Bobby Hogue (politician) =

American politician (1939–2023)

79th Speaker of the Arkansas House of Representatives
- In office January 9, 1995 – January 11, 1999
- Preceded by: Doc Bryan
- Succeeded by: Bob Johnson

Member of the Arkansas House of Representatives
- In office January 8, 1979 – January 11, 1999
- Preceded by: Kenneth R. Camp
- Succeeded by: Paul Bookout
- Constituency: 68th district (1979‍–‍1983); 22nd district (1983‍–‍1993); 87th district (1993‍–‍1999)

Personal details
- Born: Boyce LaByra Hogue; March 26, 1939 New Albany, Mississippi, U.S.
- Died: January 2, 2023 (aged 83) Jonesboro, Arkansas, U.S.
- Party: Democratic
- Education: Arkansas State University (BSA, MSE, EdS)
- Occupation: Educator; businessperson; politician; lobbyist

Boyce LaByra "Bobby" Hogue (March 26, 1939 – January 2, 2023) was an American politician. He was a member of the Arkansas House of Representatives, serving from 1979 to 1998. Hogue was a member of the Democratic Party. Hogue was the first Speaker in modern times to serve more than the traditional single two-year term.

Hogue died on January 2, 2023, at the age of 83.
