= Mark Perry (politician) =

American politician

Member of the Arkansas House of Representatives from the 42nd district
- In office January 14, 2013 – January 2015
- Preceded by: Jane English
- Succeeded by: Robert Johnson

Member of the Arkansas House of Representatives from the 44th district
- In office January 2009 – January 14, 2013
- Preceded by: Will Bond
- Succeeded by: Joe Farrer

Personal details
- Party: Democratic
- Education: University of Central Arkansas

Mark Wilson Perry is an American politician and a Democratic former member of the Arkansas House of Representatives representing District 42 since from January 14, 2013, to January 12, 2015. Perry served consecutively from January 2009 until January 2013 in the District 44 seat.

== Education ==
Perry earned his bachelor's degree in marketing from the University of Central Arkansas.

== Elections ==
- 2012 Redistricted to District 42, with Representative Jane English running for Arkansas Senate, Perry was unopposed for both the May 22, 2012 Democratic Primary and the November 6, 2012 General election.
- 2008 Initially in District 44, when Will Bond left the Legislature and left the seat open, Perry was unopposed for both the May 20, 2008 Democratic Primary and the November 4, 2008 General election.
- 2010 Perry was unopposed for both the May 18, 2010 Democratic Primary and the November 2, 2010 General election.
