= Gerald Hendrix =

American politician, farmer (1932–1996)

Gerald Clayton Hendrix (September 18, 1932 – April 24, 1996) was a farmer and banker who served in the U.S. military and the Arkansas House of Representatives. He was a Democrat.

Olen Hendrix was his father and Carmen Hendrix his mother. He lived in Antoine, Arkansas, and served on its city council. He was married to Bobbie Lou Hendrix.

Bobbie L. Hendrix was his wife.

In 1997, a memorial resolution honoring him and his family was passed in the legislature.
