= John Robinson Hampton =

American politician

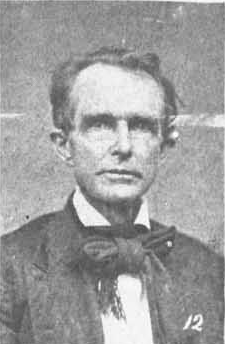
John Robinson Hampton (circa 1877)

John Robinson Hampton (April 1, 1807 – February 9, 1880) was a state legislator in Arkansas. He served in the Arkansas Senate including as President of the Arkansas Senate.

== Biography ==
He was born April 1, 1807 in Charlotte, North Carolina and was orphaned early in his life. He had little formal education before starting as a printer apprentice and going on to publish a paper in Mississippi. He moved to Tuscaloosa, Alabama where he met and married Francess Ann Webb. In 1843 he moved to Arkansas settling in Union County. Francess died shortly after and he was left caring for their two children Susan and Henry Hampton.

He served in the state senate before the American Civil War, during the Confederacy, and after Reconstruction. In the governor's absence, he served as acting governor of Arkansas. He was a delegate to the 1874 Arkansas Constitutional Convention. He was a Democrat.

He represented Bradley County, Arkansas in the Arkansas Senate from 1846 to 1851. In 1852 he was elected from Union County. He was an incorporator of the Cairo and Fulton Railroad. Hampton, Arkansas is named for him.

His last terms in the Arkansas Senate were in 1877-78 and 1879-80. He died while still serving his final session. He is buried at the Bradley County Cemetery.
