= Dave Bisbee =

American judge and politician

Member of the Arkansas Senate
- In office January 11, 1999 – January 12, 2009
- Preceded by: Fay Boozman
- Succeeded by: Cecile Bledsoe
- Constituency: 33rd district (1999–2003); 8th district (2003–2009)

Member of the Arkansas House of Representatives from the 3rd district
- In office January 11, 1993 – January 11, 1999
- Succeeded by: Cecile Bledsoe

Personal details
- Born: September 22, 1946 (age 79) Fort Dodge, Iowa, U.S.
- Party: Republican

Military service
- Branch/service: United States Marine Corps
- Battles/wars: Vietnam War

David A. Bisbee (born September 22, 1946) is an American judge and politician in the state of Arkansas. He served in the state legislature. He owned the construction company Valley Homes.

Bisbee has lived in Rogers, Arkansas and served in the Arkansas House of Representatives from 1992 to 1998 and then the Arkansas Senate from 1999 to 2008.
