= Charles L. Ormond =

American politician (1932–2017)

Member of the Arkansas House of Representatives
- In office January 8, 2001 – January 8, 2007
- Preceded by: Bob Johnson
- Succeeded by: Johnny Hoyt
- Constituency: 31st district (2001–2003); 60th district (2003–2007)
- In office January 12, 1981 – January 10, 1983
- Preceded by: Bunk Allison
- Succeeded by: Carolyn Pollan
- Constituency: 27th district

Personal details
- Born: Charles Louis Ormond; December 30, 1932 Morrilton, Arkansas, U.S.
- Died: November 24, 2017 (aged 84)
- Party: Democratic
- Spouse: Shirley Jackson
- Education: University of Arkansas

Military service
- Branch/service: United States Air Force
- Battles/wars: Korean War

Charles Louis Ormond (December 30, 1932 – November 24, 2017) was an American politician who was a member for four terms in the Arkansas House of Representatives.
