= Bud Canada =

American politician (1925–2009)

Member of the Arkansas Senate
- In office January 8, 1973 – January 8, 2001
- Preceded by: Q. Byrum Hurst
- Succeeded by: Terry Smith
- Constituency: 15th district (1973–1993); 13th district (1993–2001)

President pro tempore of the Arkansas Senate
- In office January 9, 1989 – January 14, 1991
- Preceded by: Nick Wilson
- Succeeded by: Jerry Bookout

Member of the Arkansas House of Representatives from Garland County
- In office January 12, 1959 – January 14, 1963 Serving with Ray S. Smith Jr.
- Preceded by: Dan Wolf
- Succeeded by: Nathan L. Schoenfeld

Personal details
- Born: Eugene Thomas Canada; June 6, 1925 Hartshorne, Oklahoma, U.S.
- Died: December 21, 2009 (aged 84) Hot Springs, Arkansas, U.S.
- Party: Democratic
- Spouses: Sandy Leigh Baxter (divorced); Patty Glazner Stovall (m. 2001)
- Education: University of Arkansas

Military service
- Branch/service: United States Army
- Battles/wars: Korean War
- Awards: Bronze Star Medal

Eugene Thomas "Bud" Canada (June 6, 1925 – December 21, 2009) was an American politician who served in the Arkansas House of Representatives from 1959 to 1962 and in the Arkansas Senate from 1973 to 2001.

He died on December 21, 2009, in Hot Springs, Arkansas at age 84.
