= Bradley Bunch =

Arkansas politician (1818–1894)

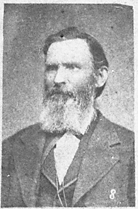
Bradley Bunch (circa 1877)

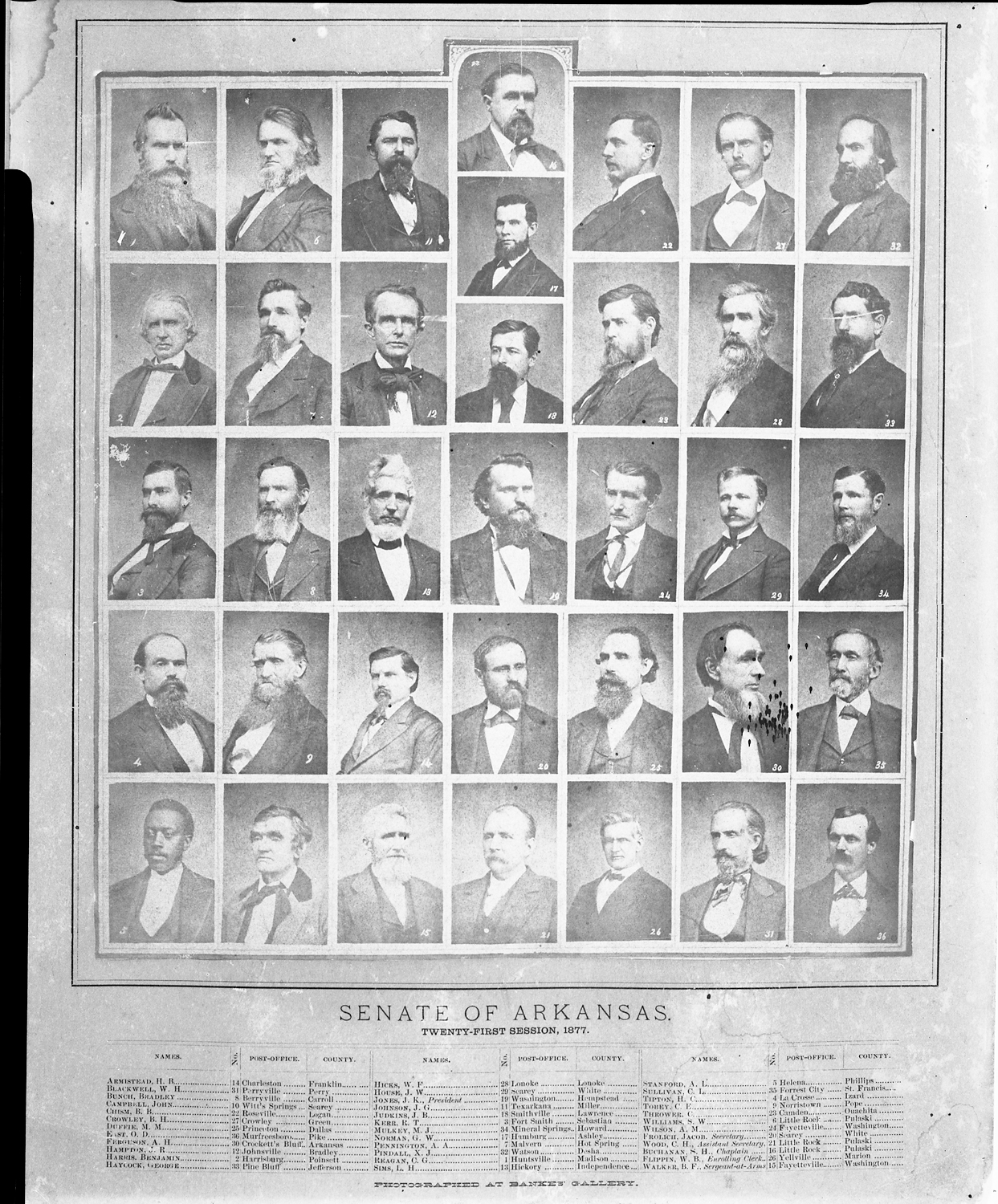
"Photograohed at Bankes' Gallery", composite photo captioned with names, county, and post-office. Bradley Bunch is 3rd from the top in the second row

Bradley Bunch (December 9, 1818 – 1894) was a state legislator, judge, and historian in Arkansas. He served in the Arkansas House of Representatives (twice as Speaker of the Arkansas House of Representatives) and in the Arkansas Senate. He represented Carroll County, Arkansas in the 1885 Arkansas Senate. His post office was in Berryville, Arkansas. He was a Democrat.

He was born in Overton County, Tennessee to Captain Nathaniel Bunch and Sally Wade Ray Bunch. He married and had numerous children.

He was a delegate to the 1874 Constitutional Convention in Arkansas. He wrote a sketch of the history of Carroll County.

In 1870 he received $7 per day for his services as Speaker of the Arkansas House.

== See also ==
- President of the Arkansas Senate
