= Q. Byrum Hurst Jr. =

American lawyer

- Born: March 14, 1949 (age 77); Hot Springs, Arkansas
- Education: Hot Springs High School University of Arkansas at Fayetteville University of Arkansas School of Law
- Occupations: Attorney; Former president of the Arkansas Trial Lawyers Association; Attorney at Hurst, Morrissey, Hurst, PLLC
- Political party: Democrat
- Spouse: Rita Marie Hurst
- Children: Harmony, Josh, Justin, Rachel, Quincy
- Father: Q. Byrum Hurst Sr.
- Website: hurst4congress.com

Quincy Byrum Hurst Jr. (born March 14, 1949), is the principal attorney in a Hot Springs, Arkansas law firm, Hurst, Morrissey, Hurst, PLLC and has been involved in Democratic Party politics throughout much of his life. On June 12, 2012, Hurst lost a race for the United States Congress in Arkansas's 4th congressional district, the seat being vacated by Representative Mike Ross. Hurst lost to State Senator Gene Jeffress, who was subsequently defeated by the Republican Tom Cotton in the 2012 general election.

== Early life and education ==
Hurst was born in Hot Springs, a resort city in central Arkansas, to Q. Byrum Hurst Sr., and the former and Hazel Earline Barham. Hurst Sr. was elected administrative judge in Garland County in 1947 and then elected to the Arkansas State Senate, in which he served for twenty-two consecutive years until he ran unsuccessfully in the 1972 Democratic gubernatorial primary against the incumbent Dale L. Bumpers.

Hurst graduated from Hot Springs High School and earned "All-State" honors as a Trojan quarterback and defensive back. He then attended the University of Arkansas and worked as a store clerk and maintained an on-campus laundry route to pay for his education expenses. Hurst was in the Army ROTC program and earned his Bachelor of Business Administration degree. He then went on to receive his Juris Doctor degree from the University of Arkansas School of Law in 1974.

== Family ==
Hurst and his wife, Rita, married c. 1980. They have reared five children and have eight grandchildren. Hurst's five children include: Harmony Morrissey, Josh Hurst, Justin Hurst, Rachel Kemp and Quincy Hurst Rachel Kemp is an attorney with the Arkansas Attorney General's office Quincy Hurst is a Vice President at Superior Senior Care. Harmony Hurst Morrissey, Josh Quincy Hurst and Justin Byrum Hurst are all licensed attorneys in Hot Springs, Arkansas.

== Career ==
Hurst has served on various boards and committees throughout his career. In 2003, he was elected president of the interest group, the Arkansas Trial Lawyers Association. In 2006, he was named a "Mid-South Super Lawyer", recognizing top lawyers in the South. He has been active in the Boys and Girls Club, the YMCA, served on the board of directors for the Arkansas Special Olympics, served on local volunteer fire departments and has been active in Oaklawn First Church of God in Hot Springs. He has taught a Sunday school class at his church since the late 1980s.
