= Lafferty =

Lafferty (Irish: Ó Laithbheartaigh) is a sept of Irish Gaels in County Donegal and County Tyrone, belonging to the Cenél nEógain of the Northern Uí Néill. They are a branch of the O'Neill family and are named after one of the earlier Kings of Ailech called Flaithbertach mac Muirchertaig meic Néil. They are not to be confused with the O'Flaherty family of Connacht. Other anglicised versions of the name are O'Laverty, O'Lafferty and Laverty.

Notable bearers of the name include:

- Daniel Lafferty (born 1989), Northern Irish Footballer
- Don Lafferty (1933–1998), Checkers Player
- Jackson Lafferty (born 1969), Canadian Politician
- James Lafferty (born 1985), American Actor
- James Delamere Lafferty (1849–1920) Canadian Politician/Doctor
- James Michael Lafferty (born 1963), American Businessman
- John Lafferty (1842–1903), American soldier and Medal of Honor recipient
- Justin Lafferty (born 1971), American politician
- Kyle Lafferty (born 1987), Northern Irish footballer
- Mike Lafferty (motorcycle racer) (born 1975), American Enduro racer
- Mike Lafferty (alpine skier) (born 1948), American alpine skier
- Mur Lafferty (born 1973), American writer and podcaster
- R. A. Lafferty (1914–2002), American science fiction and fantasy writer
- Sam Lafferty (born 1995), American ice hockey player
- Stephen W. Lafferty (born 1949), American politician
- Walter Lafferty (1875–1964), American politician

== See also ==
- Branches of the Cenél nEógain
