= Bob Johnson (Arkansas state representative) =

American accountant and politician

Robert "Bob" Johnson

Member of the Arkansas House of Representatives from the 42nd district
- Incumbent
- Assumed office January 2015
- Preceded by: Mark Perry
- Succeeded by: Mark Perry (elect)

Personal details
- Born: August 1, 1953 (age 73) Jacksonville, Arkansas, U.S.
- Party: Democratic (2013–present); Republican (until 2013)
- Spouse: Laurie Anne Johnson
- Children: 5
- Education: University of Central Arkansas; University of Arkansas at Fayetteville
- Occupation: Certified Public Accountant; Former Pulaski County Justice of the peace

Robert Johnson (born August 1, 1953) is an Arkansas accountant and politician serving in the Arkansas House of Representatives. Previously a Republican, Johnson switched parties to run for a seat in the state house, which he won without opposition in both the primary and general elections.

Preceded by Mark W. Perry	Arkansas State Representative for District 42 (Pulaski County); 2015–	Succeeded by Incumbent
