= J. B. Judkins (politician) =

American lawyer and politician from Arkansas

President of the Senate of Arkansas
- In office January 8, 1883 – March 28, 1883
- Preceded by: James P. Eagle
- Succeeded by: R. B. Weaver

Arkansas State Senator from Lawrence County
- In office 1877–1883

Arkansas State Representative
- In office 1893–1893

Sheriff of Lawrence County, Arkansas
- In office 1868–1872

Personal details
- Born: Not recognized as a date. Years must have 4 digits (use leading zeros for years < 1000). Lawrence County, Arkansas, U.S.
- Died: Not recognized as a date. Years must have 4 digits (use leading zeros for years < 1000). Black Rock, Arkansas, U.S.
- Party: Democratic
- Profession: Attorney

J. B. Judkins (fl. 1860s–1910s) was an American attorney and politician from Arkansas. A prominent figure in Lawrence County politics during the Reconstruction era and the late 19th century, Judkins held multiple public offices across three decades. He served as Sheriff of Lawrence County from 1868 to 1872, was elected to the Arkansas Senate in 1877 and again in 1880, and was chosen as President of the Arkansas Senate in 1883. He later served in the Arkansas House of Representatives during the 1893 legislative session. Outside of government, Judkins maintained a legal practice in both Smithville and Black Rock.

== Early life and Civil War service ==
Little is known about Judkins's early life, including his full given name—he is consistently recorded in official documents and historical sources as "J. B. Judkins." He was born in the early-to-mid 19th century in the Lawrence County area of northeastern Arkansas, a region established in 1815 and often called the "Mother of Counties" because it originally encompassed parts of twenty-nine Arkansas counties.

During the American Civil War, Judkins served in the Confederate States Army. He enlisted as an orderly sergeant and served under Captain William Comfort Sloan in the 30th Arkansas Infantry Regiment, which was later redesignated as the 25th Arkansas Infantry Regiment. The 30th Arkansas Infantry completed its organization at Little Rock during the late summer of 1861 and saw action in several major campaigns in the Western Theater, including operations in Arkansas and across the Trans-Mississippi Department. The regiment was reorganized and redesignated as the 25th Arkansas Infantry in 1862. After the war, Judkins returned to Lawrence County and resumed civilian life.

== Political career ==
=== Sheriff of Lawrence County (1868–1872) ===
In the turbulent political environment of the Reconstruction era, Judkins entered public service as Sheriff of Lawrence County, Arkansas, serving from 1868 to 1872. His tenure coincided with the implementation of Arkansas's Constitution of 1868, which had been adopted under the framework of the Reconstruction Acts passed by the U.S. Congress. During this period, county sheriffs were responsible for tax collection, maintaining public order, enforcing court orders, and overseeing local elections—responsibilities that took on heightened significance in a state still grappling with the social and political upheaval of the post-Civil War years.

=== Arkansas State Senate (1877–1883) ===
Judkins was elected to the Arkansas Senate, representing Lawrence County, and took his seat during the Twenty-First General Assembly of Arkansas in 1877. He was subsequently re-elected and continued to serve in the Senate, representing the senatorial district that included Lawrence County and surrounding northeastern Arkansas counties.

==== President of the Senate (1883) ====
When the Twenty-Fourth General Assembly of Arkansas convened on January 8, 1883, Judkins's colleagues in the Senate elected him as their presiding officer, serving as President of the Arkansas Senate for the duration of the legislative session, which concluded on March 28, 1883. As president, Judkins presided over Senate deliberations, appointed committee members, and maintained parliamentary order during a session that addressed issues critical to the state's post-war recovery and development. The 1883 session's Senate roster listed the following districts and representatives under Judkins's leadership: the First District (Greene, Craighead, and Clay Counties), represented by J. C. Hawthorne; the Second District (Randolph and Lawrence Counties); and other districts representing counties across the state.

Judkins served alongside John G. Holland, who was elected Secretary of the Senate for the same session. The President of the Arkansas Senate at that time was a position elected by the members of the Senate body itself, distinct from the later creation of the office of the president pro tempore, and carried with it the responsibility of shaping the legislative agenda and maintaining decorum during floor debates.

=== Arkansas House of Representatives (1893) ===
Later in his political career, Judkins transitioned to the Arkansas House of Representatives, where he served during the Twenty-Ninth General Assembly of Arkansas in 1893. His presence in the official composite photograph of the 1893 House session confirms his membership in that legislative body. Among the other members of the 1893 House were H. N. Hutton and James Robertson, who also represented northeastern Arkansas constituencies. The Twenty-Ninth General Assembly, which convened in January 1893, addressed matters including the creation of the Francis Levee District on March 21, 1893, reflecting the legislature's ongoing concern with infrastructure and flood control in the state's river regions.

== Legal career ==
Judkins was admitted to the bar and practiced law in northeastern Arkansas for many years. An entry in The Arkansas Year Book lists him as "J. B. Judkins, lawyer, Smithville," placing his legal practice in Smithville, Arkansas, an unincorporated community in Lawrence County that had once served as the county seat before its removal in 1868. Smithville was situated at an important intersection on the Military Road and had been a center of legal and commercial activity in the county's early history.

By the early 20th century, Judkins had relocated his practice to Black Rock, Arkansas, a city along the Black River in Lawrence County. A 1913 listing in The Central Law Journal, published by Soule, Thomas & Wentworth, identifies him as a practicing attorney in Black Rock, confirming his continued engagement in the legal profession well into the 20th century.

== Later life and correspondence ==
Documents in the Sloan Family Papers, archived at the University of Memphis Special Collections, include letters written by Judkins from Black Rock, Arkansas, to Mrs. H. F. Sloan of Imboden, Arkansas, dated October 7 and 14, 1911. In these letters, Judkins—described as a former orderly sergeant who had served with Captain William Comfort Sloan—furnished information about Sloan's Civil War service, including details from his enlistment onward. These letters demonstrate that Judkins was still alive and mentally sharp in 1911, and that he maintained a detailed recollection of his wartime experiences more than fifty years after the conflict had ended.

The exact date of Judkins's death is not definitively recorded in readily available sources. His absence from later Arkansas bar directories and political records, combined with the chronological gaps in documentary evidence, suggests he died sometime after 1913.

== Historical significance ==
Judkins's political career spanned a transformative period in Arkansas history, from the turbulence of Reconstruction through the Gilded Age and into the Progressive Era. His service as sheriff, state senator, senate president, and state representative makes him one of the more extensively documented local political figures of 19th-century Lawrence County. As president of the Arkansas Senate in 1883, he occupied the second-highest political office in the state government during that legislative session, a distinction shared by only a handful of individuals in Arkansas's antebellum and postbellum political history.
