= H. C. Tipton =

American politician

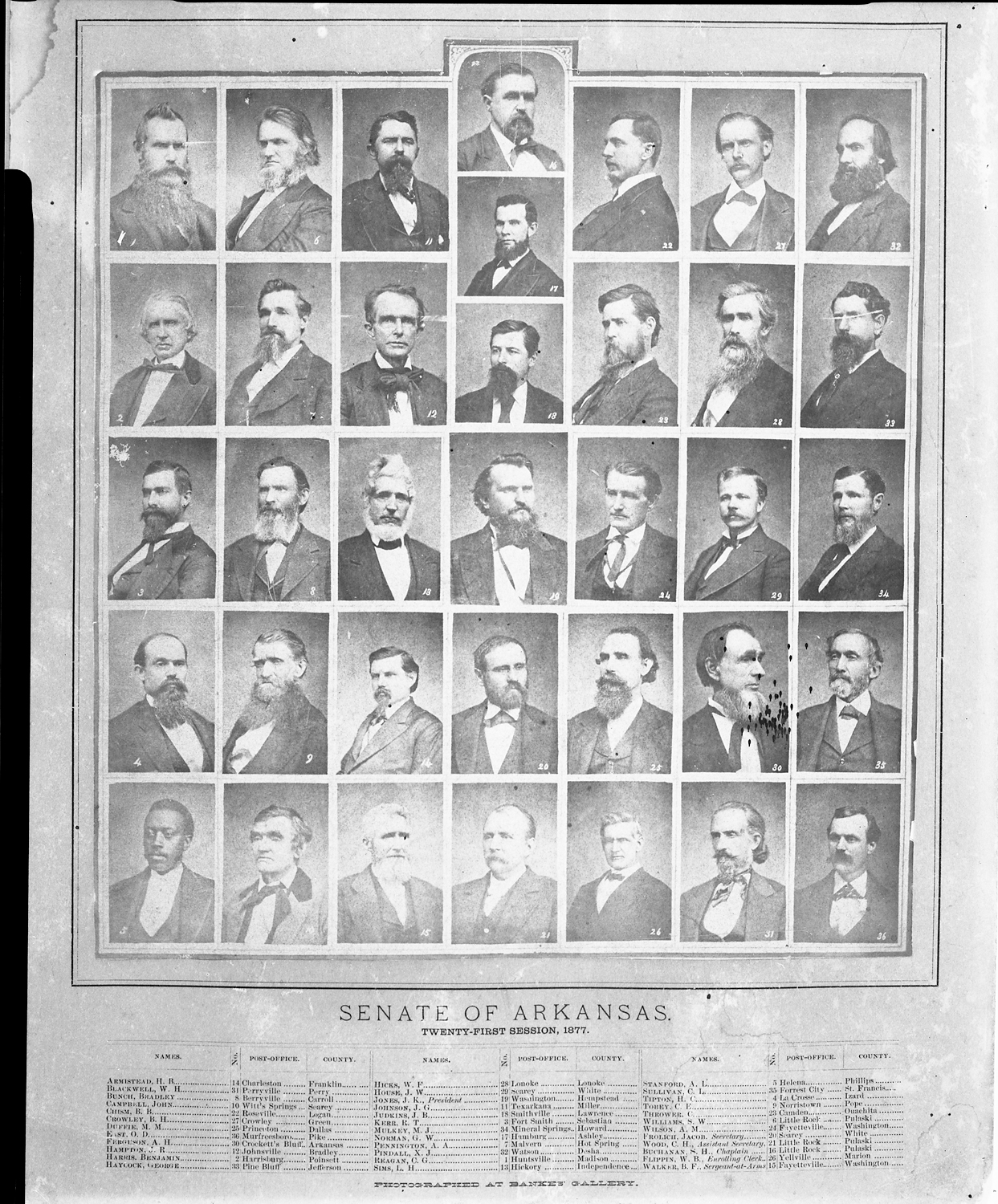
1877 Arkansas Senate composite of photographs

Henry Clay Tipton was a state legislator in Arkansas. He served in the Arkansas Senate in 1877 and again in 1881 when he became President of the Arkansas Senate. A Democrat, he represented Izard County. In 1877, his post office was identified as being in La Crosse, Arkansas. He served in the Civil War. He held an appointed federal office and became state treasurer.

He was born in Fayette County, Tennessee, to Isaac Tipton and Elizabeth Anderson Tipton. He graduated from Synodical College in LaGrange, Tennessee in 1859. He served in the Civil War and then became a farmer in De Soto County, Mississippi before relocating to Arkansas in 1871.

He established a law practice in Harrison, Arkansas and was elected mayor. He held federal office during the Grover Cleveland's presidency. He served as Treasurer of Arkansas from 1901 to 1907. succeeding Thomas E. Little after his death.

He had ten brothers and sisters. He was Presbyterian. He and his first wife Alice Lawrason had 11 children. After she died in 1905 he remarried to Mildred Hinkle.

He was a member of Phi Kappa Psi.

He served as Register of the land office in Harrison, Arkansas.

In an account describing Linnie Hutchison of Tennessee as a Confederate heroine, it is stated that she was well known to Tipton.
