= Toni Bradford =

American politician

Member of the Arkansas House of Representatives from the 18th district
- In office January 8, 2007 – January 14, 2013
- Preceded by: Jay Bradford
- Succeeded by: Richard Womack

Personal details
- Born: October 31, 1942 (age 83) Hot Springs, Arkansas
- Party: Democratic

Toni Bradford (born October 31, 1942) is an American politician who served in the Arkansas House of Representatives from the 18th district from 2007 to 2013.
