= Shorter College (Arkansas) =

Black college in Little Rock, Arkansas

Coordinates: 34°45′34″N 92°15′38″W

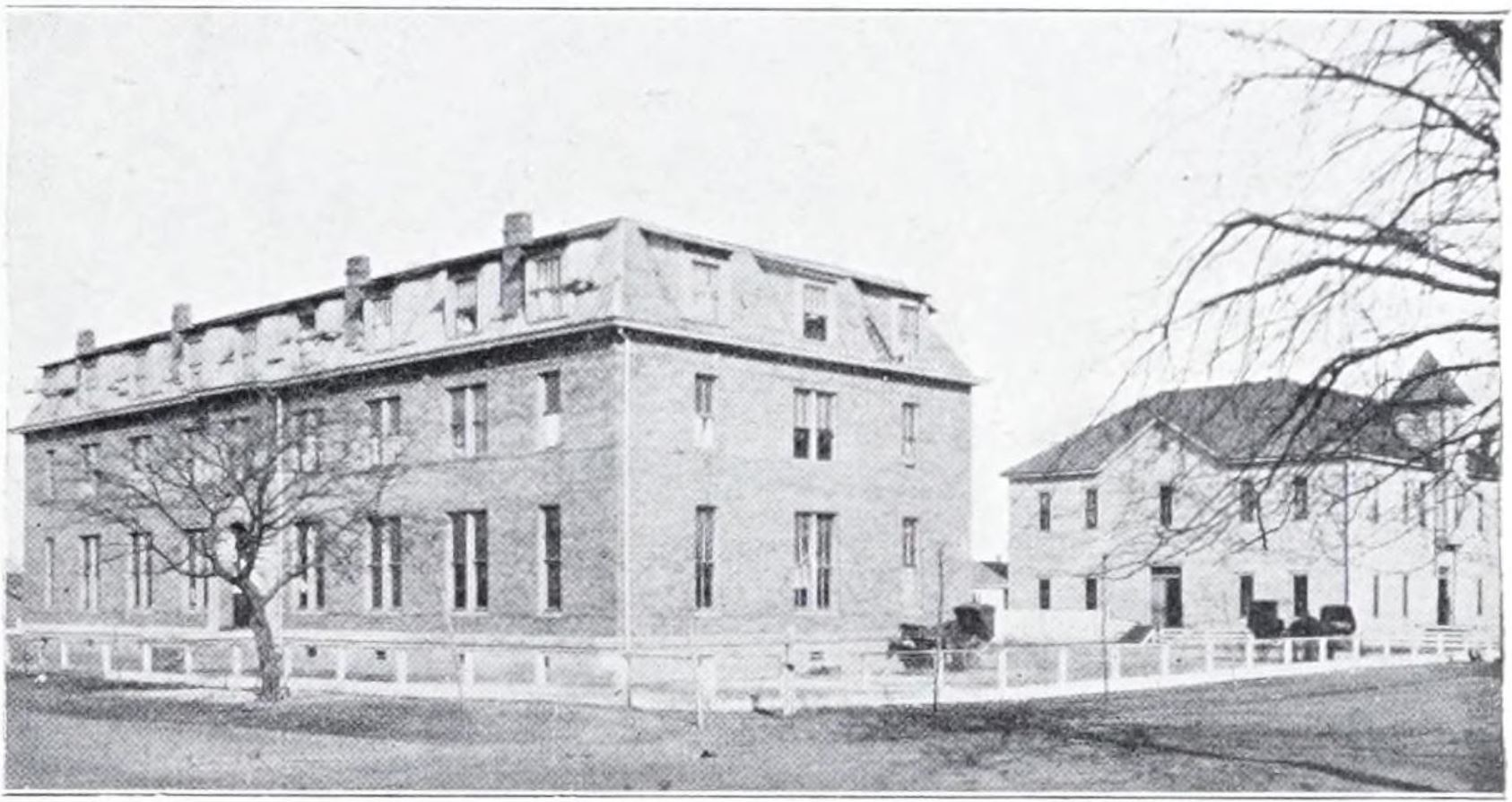
- The school c. 1910
- Former names: Bethel University (1886–1888); Bethel Institute (1888–1892); Shorter University (1892–1903)
- Motto: "Cogito Ergo Sum"
- Motto in English: "I think, therefore I am"
- Type: Private historically black liberal arts junior college
- Established: 1886
- Accreditation: TRACS
- Affiliations: African Methodist Episcopal Church
- President: Dr. Jeffery Norfleet II
- Students: 290
- Location: North Little Rock, Arkansas, United States
- Colors: Dark blue, light blue and gold
- Nickname: Bulldogs
- Website: www.shortercollege.edu

Shorter College is a private, historically black, liberal arts junior college in North Little Rock, Arkansas. It is one of the few private historically black junior college in the United States. Shorter College was founded in 1886 as Bethel University by the Twelfth Episcopal District of the African Methodist Episcopal (A.M.E.) Church. The college is accredited by the Transnational Association of Christian Colleges and Schools and offers associate degrees through its six programs.

== History ==
Shorter College began as a means to increase literacy among Arkansas's African-American population and foster their civic engagement by offering them access to education and spiritual direction once the Civil War and slavery had ended. In 1885, under presiding Bishop T. M. D Ward, the A.M.E. Church approved the establishment of a joint commission on church schools during its annual conference in Arkansas. In May 1886, five commissioners from regional state conferences were appointed to found the college as Bethel University, which would fall under the jurisdiction of the Bethel A.M.E. Church in Little Rock.

Classes commenced in September 1886 in the basement of the church with 109 students enrolled. The school's first-elected principal and assistant teacher were A.D. Delaney and Mary Jane Murphy, respectively. Initial course offerings included teacher training.

In 1888, the school was renamed Bethel Institute. In September 1891, classes recommenced at the school's new location in Arkadelphia, which was purchased with a $3,000 pledge fund.

In 1892, it was renamed Shorter University, to honor Bishop James Alexander Shorter, who is credited with establishing Arkansas as nationally recognized southern hub for the A.M.E. Church. The college received a charter two years later.

Between 1895 and 1898, the school operated campuses in Arkadelphia and North Little Rock (formerly Argenta). Its North Little Rock campus began in Bethel Church and had transitioned to its own property in the city by 1896.

In 1903, the two campuses were merged at the 604 Locust Street location in North Little Rock, and the school was renamed Shorter College.

Shorter College was offering courses from grades three through college by 1917, and was North Little Rock's only high school for black students until 1928. For a time, the college operated as a four-year institution until 1955, when it reverted back to its status as a two-year institution due to financial constraints.

In 1981, Shorter College attained full accreditation, which was required to establish transfer agreements with four-year institutions in Arkansas. The agreements would allow students to transfer their Shorter College credits to a four-year institution after earning an associate degree at Shorter College.

After a period of decline caused by internal political division and debt throughout the 1980s and 1990s, Shorter College lost accreditation and federal funding in 1998. By 2000, after enrollment had significantly decreased and its buildings were shuttered, Shorter College had entered into an agreement with the University of Arkansas at Pine Bluff that offered accredited courses to Shorter College students. By 2011, after years of fundraising and debt cancellations, Shorter College reopened its facilities and earned accreditation candidacy through the Transnational Association of Christian Colleges and Schools.

In 2013, the college attained full accreditation.

== Campus ==
Shorter College is located at 604 Locust Street in North Little Rock, Arkansas, and covers three and one-half square blocks. The campus houses Sherman-Tyree Hall, the F.C. James Human Resources Center, S. S. Morris Student Center, Henry A. Belin Health-Plex, Alexander-Turner Child Development Center, Health and Wellness Center and A.W. Young Library.

Tyree Hall was the first permanent building on campus. Completed in 1903, it was a three-story brick structure for classrooms, offices, a library, and boys’ dormitories. After undergoing a full demolition in 1957, the rebuilt two-story facility was dedicated as Sherman-Tyree Hall in 1961. It currently serves as the main administrative and instructional facility for Shorter College.

The F.C. James Human Resources Center took two years to build and was completed in 1979. It was named after Bishop Frederick C. James, a civil rights leader and one of the people credited with achieving initial accreditation for Shorter College. It includes a 148-seat auditorium that was fully-renovated in 2015. A weekly College Assembly/Chapel service has been held in the facility.

The S.S. Morris Student Center was fully constructed in 1974 and underwent renovations in 2014. It was designed to be the hub of student activity and houses a banquet hall, kitchen, student lounge and activity spaces and the Division of Student Affairs.

The Henry A. Belin Health-Plex is home to the college's gymnasium, which was completed in 1992. The health-plex serves as the venue for physical education classes and sports, career fair and commencement events. A weekly College Assembly/Chapel service has been also been held at the health-plex.

The Alexander-Turner Child Development Center offers child care services to college students and the greater Shorter College community. Completed in 1995, the facility partnered with Headstart to attain funding for facility renovations. The center contains observation rooms for Child Development students.

The Health and Wellness Center offers health screening and health information to the Shorter College community. The building was donated to the school in 2014 and renovated the following year. In 2015, Shorter College purchased property near the Health and Wellness Center and partnered with the Arkansas Minority Health Commission to open the property as a free medical clinic for the greater Shorter College community.

The A.W. Young Library is a 6,818 square foot (633.4 m^{2}) facility that contains a classroom, student seating and computer area, office space and 3,215 square feet (298.7 m^{2}) of bookstacks.

== Administration and organization ==
Shorter College's parent organization is the Twelfth Episcopal District of the African Methodist Episcopal (A.M.E.) Church. The college is organized under a board of trustees, with the presiding bishop of the Twelfth Episcopal District of the A.M.E. Church as chairman. The majority of the board members, who are clergy or lay members, are elected through the four annual Arkansas A.M.E. Church conferences. The president of Shorter College is an ex-officio member who reports to the board through the Twelfth Episcopal District of the A.M.E. Church.

Shorter College offers six degree programs: Child Development, Christian Leadership, Criminal Justice, General Studies, Entrepreneurial Studies and Computer Science.

A typical academic year contains two 15-week terms during the fall (August–December) and spring (January–April). There are two accelerated four-week summer sessions that run from May to June and June to July. An academic year begins on the first day of the fall term and ends on the last day of the second summer term.

== Academics and programs ==
Shorter College has an open admissions policy.

The college offers early entry and dual enrollment programs to local high school students.

Since 2016, Shorter College has participated in the Second Chance Pell program, an initiative that offers Pell Grants to students who are incarcerated.

== Student life ==
Demographics of student body in fall 2020
	Full and Part Time Students	U.S. Census (Note: People who identify as Hispanic/Latino are included in applicable race categories.)
International	0%	N/A
Multiracial American	0%	2.8%
Black/African American	85%	13.4%
American Indian and Alaska Native	0%	1.3%
Asian	0%	5.9%
Non-Hispanic White American	13%	60.1%
Hispanic/Latino American	1%	18.5%
Native Hawaiian and Other Pacific Islander	0%	0.2%
Other/Unknown	0%	N/A

=== Student body ===
As of fall 2020, Shorter College's student body consists of 223 students. There are 89 percent full time and 11 percent part time students.

=== Organizations ===
The following student groups operate at Shorter College: Black Male Initiative, Health and Wellness Club, National Association of Black Men United, Phi Beta Lambda and Student Government Association.

== List of principals and presidents ==
Everyone listed prior to 1893 served as a principal only.

- Julian T. Bailey, 1886-1887
- Professor A. D. Delaney, 1887–1890
- Professor John R. Rector, 1890–1890 (Note: Rector resigned after three days to become a government clerk. Assistant Mary Jane Murphy served as the interim principal.)
- Professor S. T. Boyd, 1891–1893
- B. W. Arnett Jr., 1893–1894
- T. H. Jackson, 1895–1897
- F. T. Vinegar, 1897–1898
- J. A. McGivary Jones, 1898–1900
- T. H. Jackson, 1900–1904
- P. W. Walls, 1904–1904 (Note: Walls resigned.)
- Rev. A. H. Hill, 1904–1912
- Rev. O. L. Moody, 1912–1914
- William Byrd, 1914–1917
- Rev. J. N. Campbell, 1917–1919
- Rev. S. L. Green, 1919–?
- Theophilus D. Alexander
- A. O. Wilson, 1958–1960
- H. Solomon Hill, 1960–1968
- Lonnie L. Johnson, 1970–1971
- Oley L. Griffin, 1972–1977
- R.J. Hampton, 1977–1980
- John L. Phillips Sr., 1980–1987
- H. Benjamin Williams, 1987–1988
- W. Dean Goldsby, 1988–1989
- Katherine P. Mitchell, 1989–1997
- Irma Hunter Brown, 1998–2001
- Cora D. McHenry, 2002–?
- Lillie Alexis
- Katherine P. Mitchell, ?–2012

== Notable alumni ==
- Daisy Bates, civil rights activist, newspaper publisher, mentor of the Little Rock Nine
- Irma Hunter Brown, former president of Shorter College, first African-American female legislator in Arkansas
- James H. Cone, theologian, founder black liberation theology
- Alex Hill, jazz pianist and music arranger
- Scipio Africanus Jones, educator, defense attorney for the Elaine Twelve in Arkansas, politician
- E. Melvin Porter, civil rights leader, first African-American Senator of Oklahoma
- Robert Stanton, dentist and state politician, one of the first two African-Americans elected to the Indiana lower house in the 20th century (Note: Stanton was elected as Democratic Party candidate in 1932 and 1934. He helped organize African-American support for the Democratic Party in Lake County, Indiana.)
- Alphonse Trent, jazz pianist and territory band leader
