= Max Howell (politician) =

American politician (1915–1999)

Member of the Arkansas Senate
- In office January 8, 1951 – January 11, 1993
- Preceded by: Ed Dillion
- Succeeded by: Bill Gwatney
- Constituency: 13th district (1951–1953); 15th district (1953–1967); 18th district (1967–1973); 1st district (1973–1983); 26th district (1983–1993)

President pro tempore of the Arkansas Senate
- In office January 14, 1963 – January 11, 1965
- Preceded by: Clifton Wade
- Succeeded by: Fred H. Stafford

Member of the Arkansas House of Representatives from Pulaski County
- In office January 13, 1947 – January 8, 1951
- Preceded by: Price Shofner

Personal details
- Born: William Max Howell; December 22, 1915 Lonoke, Arkansas, U.S.
- Died: October 15, 1999 (aged 83) Little Rock, Arkansas, U.S.
- Party: Democratic
- Spouses: Lula Agnes Gray (divorced); Inez Donham (m. 1967)
- Occupation: Lawyer; farmer; politician

Military service
- Branch/service: United States Army; Arkansas Army National Guard
- Years of service: 1942–1946 (active); 1948–1975 (ARARNG)
- Rank: Brigadier general
- Battles/wars: World War II

William Max Howell (December 22, 1915 – October 15, 1999) was an American lawyer and politician who served as a longtime member of the Arkansas Senate.

He was born in Lonoke County. He moved with his family to Little Rock.
