= Lindsley Smith =

American politician

Member of the Arkansas House of Representatives from the 92nd district
- In office January 10, 2005 – January 10, 2011
- Preceded by: Jan Judy
- Succeeded by: Greg Leding

Personal details
- Born: Lindsley Farrar Armstrong; September 8, 1963 (age 63) Birmingham, Alabama, U.S.
- Party: Democratic
- Spouse: Stephen Smith (m. 1994)
- Education: Jefferson State Community College (AA); University of West Florida (BA, MA); University of Arkansas (JD)
- Occupation: Educator; politician

Lindsley Farrar Armstrong Smith (born September 8, 1963) is an American educator and former state legislator in Arkansas. She served in the Arkansas House of Representatives from 2005 to 2010.

Born in Birmingham, Alabama, she received an associate degree from Jefferson State Community College. She received her BA and MA from University of West Florida. She taught. She married communications professor Stephen Smith in 1994. She earned a J.D. from the University of Arkansas.

She served in the Arkansas House from 2005 to 2010. She represented the 92nd state house district, based in Fayetteville. She recorded interviews with some of her female colleagues in the legislature.
