= Russell Elrod =

Arkansas lawyer and state legislator

Arkansas Senate
- In office 1945–1968

President Pro Tempore of the Arkansas Senate
- In office 1953–1954

Personal details
- Born: November 30, 1904 Mosley Prairie, Oklahoma
- Died: December 3, 1985 (aged 81)
- Party: Democratic

Russell Elrod (November 30, 1904 - December 3, 1985) was a lawyer and long-serving state legislator in Arkansas. He served in the Arkansas Senate including as President Pro Tempore of the Arkansas Senate in 1953.

He was born at Moseley Prairie in Delaware County, Oklahoma and schooled in Siloam Springs, Arkansas. He worked as a lawyer in Siloam Springs. He gained the nickname the "Little Fox" of Benton County. Elrod served from 1945 until 1968, when he was succeeded by Jim Caldwell. Elrod also served as Siloam Springs city attorney for 12 years. He is pictured in composite photographs of the Arkansas Senate in 1951 and 1965.

Elrod died December 3, 1985 aged 81.
