= Will Bond =

American politician (born 1970)

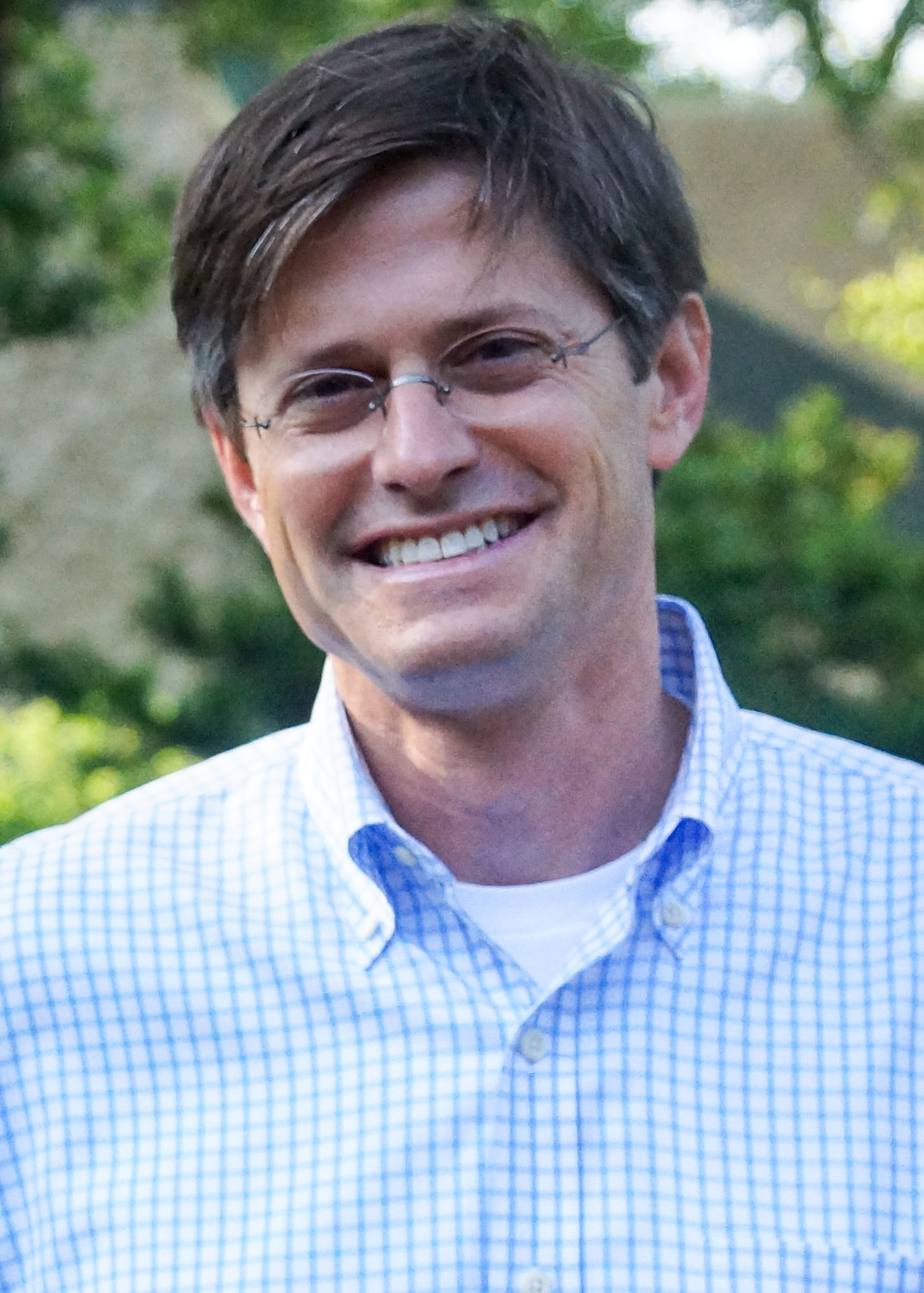

Member of the Arkansas Senate from the 32nd district
- In office January 2017 – January 11, 2021
- Preceded by: David Johnson
- Succeeded by: Clarke Tucker

Chair of the Arkansas Democratic Party
- In office February 12, 2011 – July 31, 2013
- Preceded by: Todd Turner
- Succeeded by: Vincent Insalaco

Member of the Arkansas House of Representatives from the 44th district
- In office January 2003 – January 2008
- Preceded by: Pat Bond
- Succeeded by: Mark Perry

Personal details
- Born: April 8, 1970 (age 56) Jacksonville, Arkansas, U.S.
- Party: Democratic
- Spouse: Gabriel Bond
- Children: Cy, Marlee, Elliot
- Parent(s): Tommy Bond, Pat Bond
- Education: Vanderbilt University (BA '92); University of Arkansas (JD '95)
- Occupation: Attorney
- Website: Official website

Will Bond (born April 8, 1970) is an American attorney and Democratic politician from Little Rock, Arkansas. Born in Jacksonville, Bond studied political science at Vanderbilt University before earning a Juris Doctor at the University of Arkansas School of Law in 1995. Working as an attorney in Central Arkansas, Bond represented the Jacksonville area in the Arkansas House of Representatives from 2003 to 2008. He was elected chair of the Democratic Party of Arkansas in 2011, serving until 2013. Bond served in the Arkansas Senate from 2017 to 2021. He lives in Little Rock with his wife Gabriel and their three children.

== Background ==
Born April 8, 1970, in Jacksonville, Bond is the son of former State Representative Pat Bond and Tommy Bond. He has two sisters, Melissa Bond and Kelly Bond Emerson. Will Bond graduated from Jacksonville High School. He attended Vanderbilt University in Nashville, Tennessee, receiving a Bachelor of Arts in political science in 1992, and graduating from the University of Arkansas School of Law in Fayetteville in 1995.

He worked as an associate at Friday, Eldredge & Clark in Little Rock until 1996. Bond joined Pulaski County Clerk Pat O'Brien in creating the Bond & O'Brien law firm, which would change to Bond & Chamberlin when Neil Chamberlin joined the firm in 2002. Bond succeeded his mother, Pat, in representing the 44th District of the Arkansas House of Representatives from 2003 to 2008. Representative Bond's service in the House earned him recognition in Arkansas Business's "40 under 40" list in 2005.

Arkansas's state house and senate offices are part-time positions, and Bond continued legal work during his service in the Arkansas House. Bond joined McMath Woods, P.A., a plaintiff's firm specializing in injury law, as a partner in 2006. He is admitted to practice law in all state and federal courts in Arkansas, the Eighth Circuit Court of Appeals, and the Supreme Court of the United States.

Bond and his wife Gabriel live in Little Rock, Arkansas with their three children.

=== Democratic Party of Arkansas ===
On February 12, 2011, Bond was elected to serve as the chair of the Democratic Party of Arkansas. Bond remained in the position until resigning on July 31, 2013. It was speculated Bond was resigning to pursue elected office, including the Arkansas 2nd or Arkansas Attorney General, but he chose not to run. Bond was replaced at the DPA by Vincent Insalaco.

== Political career ==
=== State House ===
During his time in the Arkansas House of Representatives (2003-2008), Bond held numerous positions including Chairman of the city, County and Local Affairs Committee and served on the Joint Budget Committee, including being Chair of the Special Language subcommittee. Arkansas Business awarded Bond with the Top 40 Under 40 Award for his legislative work on school consolidation, health savings accounts, efforts to reduce recidivism in the state's Department of Correction and identity theft prevention.

=== State Senate ===
On June 18, 2015, Bond announced he would run for the Arkansas State Senate. The 32nd District is a strong Democratic district, located in an affluent section of Little Rock including the Arkansas State Capitol, Colony West, Leawood, Cammack Village, Pleasant Valley, and parts of Chenal Valley. The incumbent, David Johnson, chose to run for Jacksonville/Maumelle District Judge. Initially believed to be a crowded Democratic field, Bond won the Democratic nomination unopposed. Bond defeated Jacob Mosier of the Libertarian Party, 75% to 25%, on November 8, 2016, to win the seat (the Republican Party did not field a candidate).

He was assigned to the city, County and Local Affairs and Judiciary committees. Bond was the primary sponsor of 21 bills in the 91st General Assembly, with four minor bills becoming law. He co-sponsored the Teacher's Classroom Investment Deduction, an up-to $250 tax credit for teachers who buy school supplies out-of-pocket.

Preceded by David Johnson	Arkansas Senate (District 32); January 2017–January 11, 2021	Succeeded by Clarke Tucker
Preceded by Dave Bisbee	Chair of the Arkansas Democratic Party; February 12, 2011–July 31, 2013	Succeeded by Vincent Insalaco
Preceded by Pat Bond	Arkansas House; District 44; 2003–2008	Succeeded by Mark Perry
