= Jodie Mahony =

American politician

Member of the Arkansas House of Representatives
- In office 2003–2007
- Preceded by: Jim Bob Duggar
- Succeeded by: John Lowery
- Constituency: 6th district
- In office 1971–1995
- Preceded by: Worth Camp Jr.
- Succeeded by: Courtney Sheppard
- Constituency: 41st district (1971–1973); 42nd district (1973–1983); 98th district (1983–1993); 50th district (1993–1995)

Member of the Arkansas Senate from the 2nd district
- In office 1995–2003
- Preceded by: William D. Moore Jr.
- Succeeded by: Randy Laverty

Personal details
- Born: Joseph Kirby Mahony II; September 12, 1939 El Dorado, Arkansas, U.S.
- Died: December 6, 2009 (aged 70) El Dorado, Arkansas, U.S.
- Party: Democratic
- Spouse: Bettie Anne Humphreys
- Education: Southern State College (BA); University of Arkansas (JD)

Military service
- Allegiance: United States
- Branch/service: United States Marine Corps
- Years of service: 1959–1965

Joseph Kirby "Jodie" Mahony II (September 12, 1939 – December 6, 2009) was an American lawyer and politician. A Democrat, Mahony served continuously as a member of the Arkansas General Assembly from 1971 to 2007.
