= Claud Cash =

American politician (1935–2004)

Member of the Arkansas Senate from the 29th district
- In office January 8, 2001 – January 13, 2003
- Preceded by: Gene Roebuck
- Succeeded by: Jerry Bookout

Member of the Arkansas House of Representatives from the 88th district
- In office January 11, 1993 – January 13, 1997
- Succeeded by: Bobby Lee Trammell

Personal details
- Born: Claud Vernon Cash; February 24, 1935
- Died: March 8, 2004 (aged 69); Jonesboro, Arkansas, U.S.
- Political party: Democratic
- Spouse: Joan Sugg
- Children: 2
- Education: Arkansas State University

Claud Vernon Cash (February 24, 1935 – March 8, 2004) was an American politician, who served in the Arkansas House of Representatives and Arkansas Senate. His wife, Joan, later served in the state house from 2007 to 2011.
