= Jerry Bookout =

American politician and funeral director

Member of the Arkansas Senate
- In office January 13, 2003 – February 22, 2006
- Preceded by: Claud Cash
- Succeeded by: Paul Bookout
- Constituency: 14th district
- In office January 8, 1973 – January 13, 1997
- Preceded by: Bill Bishop
- Succeeded by: Gene Roebuck
- Constituency: 30th district (1973–1983); 11th district (1983–1993); 29th district (1993–1997)

President pro tempore of the Arkansas Senate
- In office January 14, 1991 – January 11, 1993
- Preceded by: Bud Canada
- Succeeded by: Jerry D. Jewell

Member of the Arkansas House of Representatives from the 11th district
- In office January 9, 1967 – January 8, 1973
- Preceded by: Norman Wimpy

Personal details
- Born: Paul Jerry Bookout; November 2, 1933 Rector, Arkansas, U.S.
- Died: February 22, 2006 (aged 72)
- Party: Democratic
- Children: 2, including Paul
- Education: Arkansas State College (BA)

Military service
- Branch/service: United States Army
- Years of service: 1955–1957 (active)

Paul Jerry Bookout (November 2, 1933 – February 22, 2006), known as Jerry Bookout, was an American politician and funeral director in Arkansas. He served in the Arkansas House of Representatives and Arkansas Senate, including as President of the Arkansas Senate.

Born in Rector, Arkansas, Bookout went to the Rector public schools. In 1955, Bookout graduated with a bachelor's degree in history and political science, from Arkansas State University. From 1955 to 1957, Bookout served in the United States Army and then Arkansas National Guard. Bookout served as a funeral director in Jonesboro, Arkansas. From 1966 to 1972, Bookout served in the Arkansas House of Representatives from the 11th District and was a Democrat. Then, from 1973 to 1995 and from 2003 until his death, Bookout served in the Arkansas Senate.

Bookout died from cancer in Jonesboro, Arkansas. His son, Paul Bookout, also served in the Arkansas General Assembly.
