= George Nicholas Wilson =

Arkansas Politician

George Nicholas Wilson (born March 12, 1942) was a former state legislator in Arkansas. Wilson served in the Arkansas Senate from 1971 to 2000 including as President of the Arkansas Senate from 1987 to 1988.

He was convicted of racketeering and tax fraud. After his conviction he and his wife deducted the restitution from their taxes before being forced to repay the money with interest. He was a delegate at Arkansas' 1969 Constitutional Convention.

His post office was list as in Pocohantas. He was part of a corrupt ring of Arkansas lawmakers.
