= David Johnson (Arkansas politician) =

American politician

Member of the Arkansas Senate from the 32nd district
- In office 2009–2017
- Preceded by: Jim Argue
- Succeeded by: Will Bond

Member of the Arkansas House of Representatives from the 38th district
- In office 2005–2009
- Preceded by: Steve Napper
- Succeeded by: John C. Edwards

Personal details
- Party: Democratic
- Education: Georgetown University; University of Arkansas School of Law
- Occupation: Attorney

David Edward Johnson is an American politician and lawyer. He served as an Arkansas state senator from 2009 to 2017 and as an Arkansas state representative from 2005 until 2009. He is a member of the Democratic Party.

== Personal life and education ==
Johnson earned a BA from Georgetown University in 1991 and a JD from the University of Arkansas School of Law in 1997. Johnson is the father of three daughters: Sydney, Emery, and Ansley Johnson.

== Career ==
Prior to serving in public office, Johnson served as a legislative aide to U.S. Senator Dale Bumpers, and was also a deputy prosecutor in Pulaski County. Johnson was elected to the Arkansas House of Representatives in 2004, and served there until he was elected to the Arkansas Senate in 2008. As a state senator, Johnson championed legislation to promote children's dental health. Johnson also authored legislation that created new energy savings programs for the State of Arkansas and municipalities and counties in the state.

In 2016, Johnson joined Central Arkansas Water as general counsel.
