= Gene Roebuck (politician) =

American politician

Member of the Arkansas Senate from the 29th district
- In office January 13, 1997 – January 8, 2001
- Succeeded by: Claud Cash

Personal details
- Born: May 13, 1935 Gould, Arkansas
- Died: March 8, 2021 (aged 85) Jonesboro, Arkansas
- Party: Democratic

Gene Roebuck (May 13, 1935 – March 8, 2021) was an American politician who served in the Arkansas Senate from the 29th district from 1997 to 2001.

He died on March 8, 2021, in Jonesboro, Arkansas at age 85.
