= Brenda Gullett =

Arkansas politician

Brenda Gullett owns a corporate training company and served in the Arkansas House of Representatives and Arkansas Senate. She lives in Fayetteville, Arkansas. She lived in Pine Bluff, Arkansas.

A native of Houston, Texas, she graduated from the University of Houston.

She married Dr. Robert R. Gullett Jr. and they have two sons.
