= Charles Stewart (Arkansas politician) =

American lawyer and politician (1927–2021)

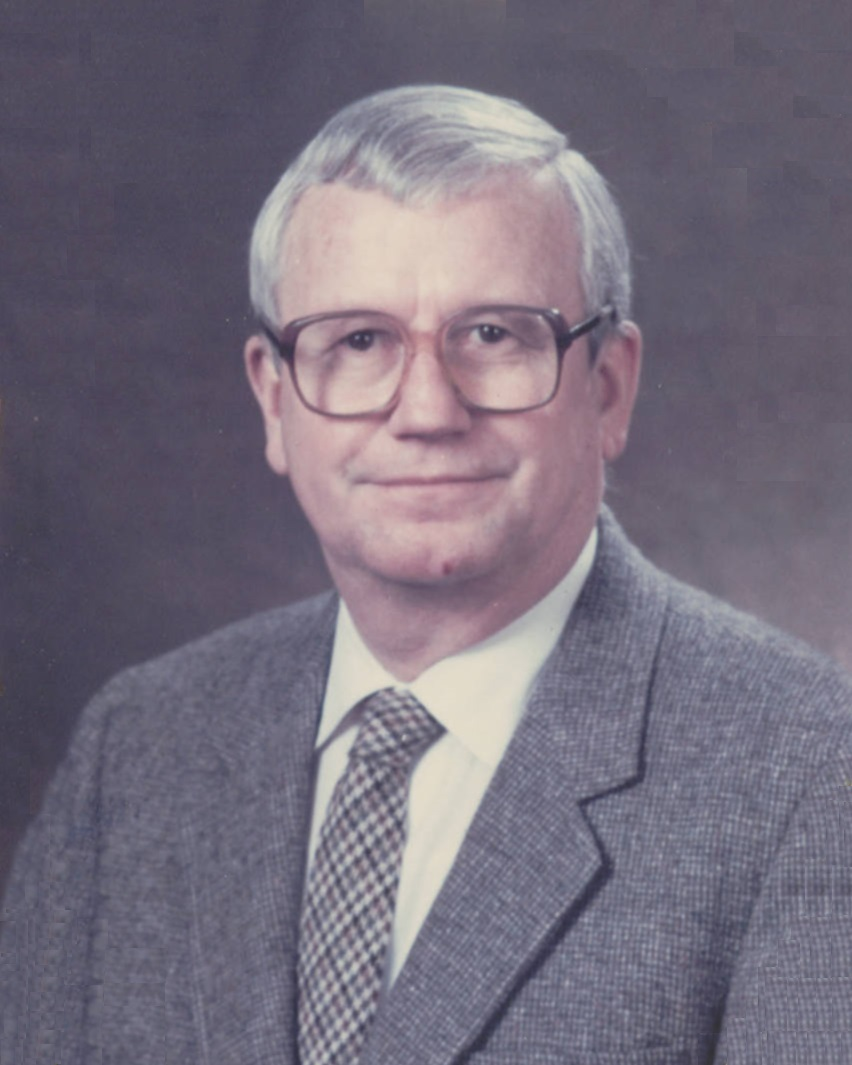
- Official portrait, 1985

Member of the Arkansas House of Representatives
- In office January 10, 1955 – January 11, 1999
- Preceded by: Clifton Wade
- Succeeded by: Jan Judy
- Constituency: Washington County (1955‍–‍1967); 7th district (1967‍–‍1973); 10th district (1973‍–‍1983); 16th district (1983‍–‍1993); 7th district (1993‍–‍1999)

Personal details
- Born: Charles Wesley Stewart III; September 25, 1927; El Dorado, Arkansas, U.S.
- Died: February 1, 2021 (aged 93); Fayetteville, Arkansas, U.S.
- Political party: Democratic
- Spouse: Joanne Dee Rogers (m. 1955; died 2015)
- Education: University of Arkansas
- Occupation: Businessman; lawyer; politician

Military service
- Branch/service: United States Navy
- Battles/wars: World War II

Charles Wesley Stewart III (September 25, 1927 – February 1, 2021), sometimes referred to as Charles W. Stewart Jr., was an American businessman, lawyer, and politician. A member of the Democratic Party, he served 22 consecutive two-year terms in the Arkansas House of Representatives, representing all or parts of Washington County, Arkansas, making him the longest-serving member in the history of that body. He was required to forgo reelection in 1998, due to the state legislature's adoption of term limits.
