= Olen Hendrix =

State legislator from Arkansas

Olen Hendrix (July 12, 1909 – August 5, 1998) was a businessman, banker, and state legislator in Arkansas. He served in the Arkansas Senate from 1959–1982. He served as President of the Arkansas Senate in 1971.

He was born in Pike County, Arkansas. He was one of two owners of Magnolia Manor in Arkadelphia, Arkansas. He was educated up to the 8th grade.

He served on the Harding University Board of Trustees. He received an honorary degree from the university. A building at the university is named for him.

He married Carmen Cornish in 1929 and they had four children including Gerald Hendrix, who served in the Arkansas House of Representatives.

He is buried at the Antoine Cemetery.

== See also ==
- Antoine, Arkansas
