= Irma Hunter Brown =

American politician

Personal details
- Education: Memphis State University

Irma Hunter Brown is an American educator, college president, and former politician in Arkansas. She was a member of the Arkansas House of Representatives from 1981 to 1998 and a member of the Arkansas Senate from 2003 to 2008. She was the first African American woman to be an Arkansas legislator. Her photograph was included in a composite with other House members.

She is a native of Tampa, Florida. She attended Shorter Junior College and graduated magna cum laude from Arkansas AM&N (now the University of Arkansas at Pine Bluff). She also attended Memphis State University and D.C. Teachers College. She served in the Arkansas House from 1980-1998. She was elected to the Arkansas Senate in 2002 and served in it for six years.
