= Matthew McClintock Duffie =

Arkansas politician (1833–1906)

Matthew McClintock Duffie (March 11, 1833 – September 12, 1906) was a teacher, lawyer, officer in the Confederate Army, state legislator, and diplomat from Arkansas. A Democrat, he served as president of the Arkansas Senate.

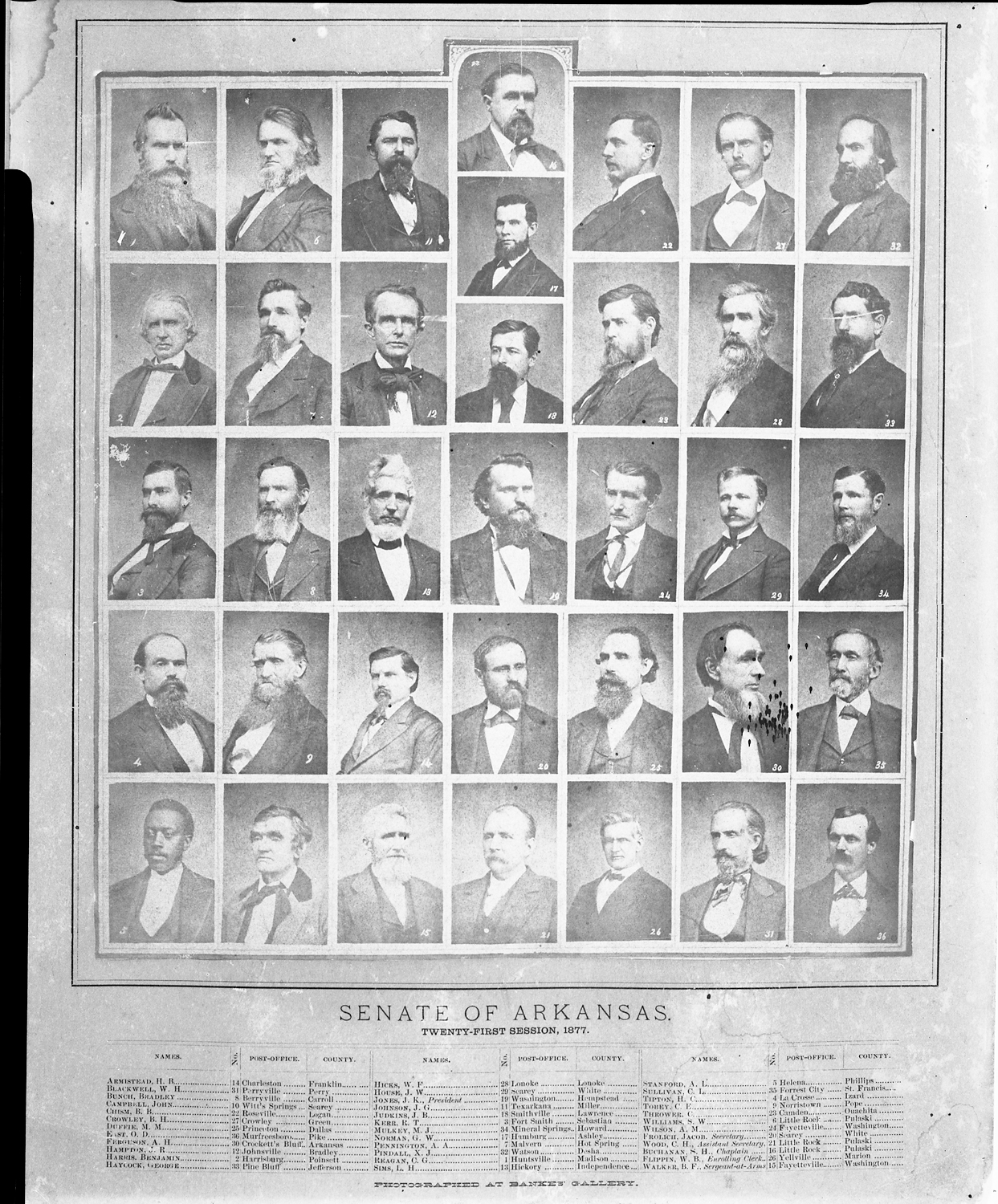
Composite photograph of 1877 Arkansas Senate "Photograohed at Bankes' Gallery" (#25, fifth row fourth from the top)

He was born in Blackstock, South Carolina and graduated from Erskine College.

In the 1877 composite photo of the Arkansas Senate his post office is listed as Princeton, Arkansas and his county as Dallas County, Arkansas.
