= Ripley B. Weaver =

American politician (1829–1900)

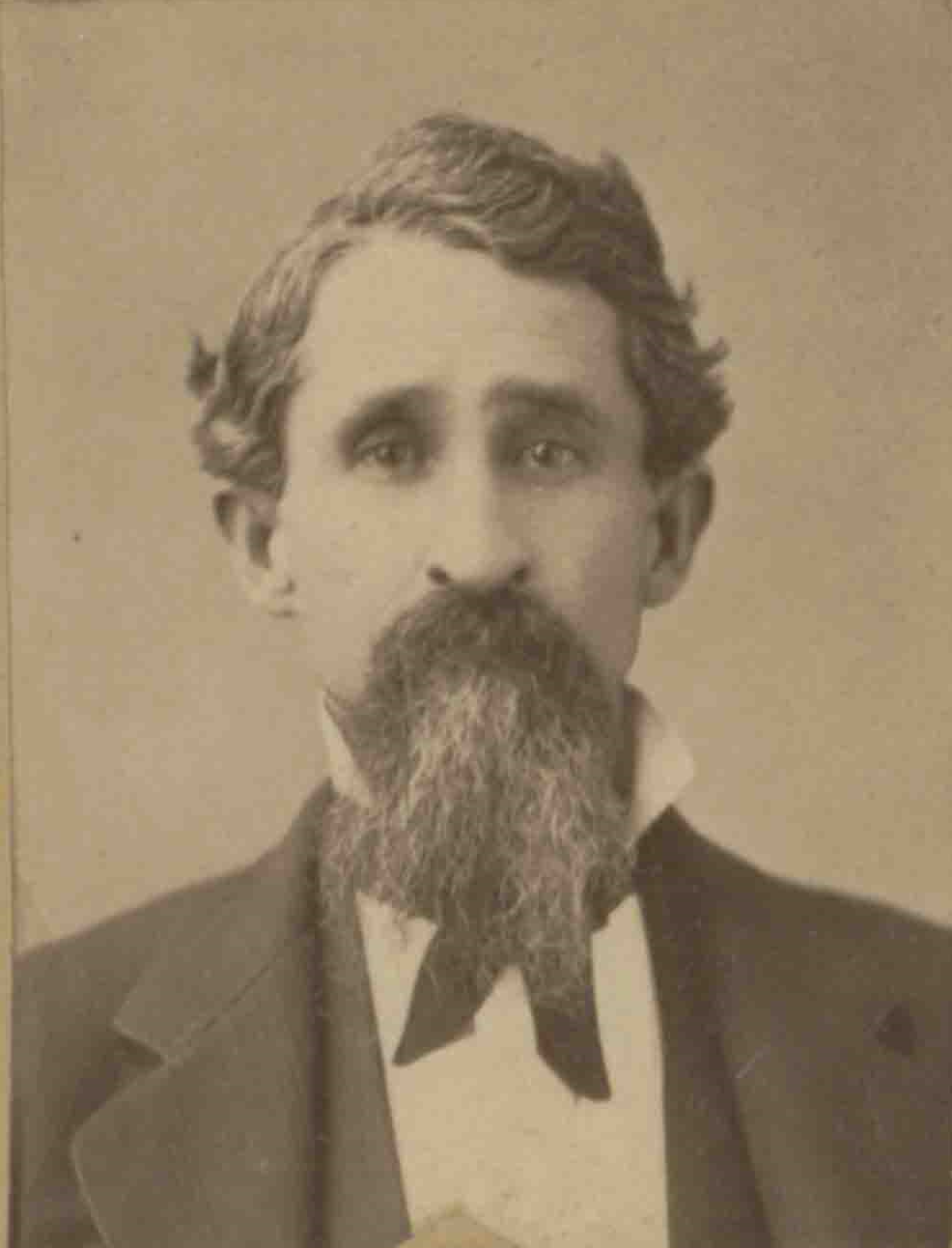

Ripley "Rip" B. Weaver (October 9, 1829 – December 1900) was a soldier, raiser of stock animals, state legislator, and government official from Arkansas. He served in the Arkansas House of Representatives and the Arkansas Senate, including as President of the Arkansas Senate. He was a Democrat.

== Biography ==
Weaver was a director for Arkansas participation in a world's fair and was appointed a negotiator with the Utes in Colorado He was listed as of Rally Hill when reported to have been appointed a commissioner for Arkansas' participation in the Trans-Mississippi Exposition in 1898. His photograph is included in a composite of Arkansas state senators in 1881 and 1885. He chaired the Arkansas Senate committee on counties and county lines. Members of the Arkansas Senate elected him president of the body in 1885. He was a federal official in 1889 involved in producing a treaty with the Utes of Colorado.
