= Pledge fund =

Collective investment scheme

A pledge fund is a collective investment scheme that allows investors to make investment decisions on deal-to-deal basis. It emerged after the dotcom bubble when many investors abandoned the conventional private equity fund format in favour of angel investor clubs that allowed members to decide on whether to take part in a certain investment opportunity. The model itself is not limited to venture financing and can be applied across a multitude of business sectors wherein investments are made on per-deal basis.

Unlike the traditional private equity fund, the pledge fund allows investors to opt-in or opt-out of each investment opportunity the manager presents. The capital is contributed to a special purpose entity that purchases the shares. The fund may be organized within one SPV or establish separate SPVs for every portfolio investment. The investors' right to opt-in and opt-out of deals makes pledge fund management, administration and documentation more complicated compared to a traditional private equity fund. Pledge fund models minimize investing partners' capital risks but there are certain drawbacks. For example, the extra time required to assess and screen investment opportunities, and deal execution uncertainty as investors decide whether they want to invest or not, may be disadvantageous in a competitive acquisition process.

== See also ==
- Private equity
- Private equity fund
- Search fund
