= Jimmy Jeffress =

American politician

Jimmy Jeffress is a retired school teacher and former politician in Arkansas. He served in the Arkansas House of Representatives and Arkansas Senate. He served in the Arkansas House in 1997 and 1999 and in the Arkansas Senate from 2001 to 2009. During his time in congress, he was one of the only Democrats to be a member of the right-wing lobbying group American Legislative Exchange Council (A.L.E.C.). The Arkansas Senate has a collection of photographs of him. The Center for Arkansas History and Culture has a collection of his papers.
