= Julian T. Bailey =

American lawyer, professor, and publisher

Julian Talbot Bailey (born March 22, 1859 – unknown) was an African-American lawyer, educator, journalist, newspaper editor, publisher, and civil rights advocate in Arkansas.

Bailey was born in Warren County, Georgia. He graduated from Howard University and became a teacher. He served as president of Bethel University from 1886 to 1887.

In 1891, he was admitted to the bar and established The Sun newspaper in Little Rock.

He was quoted as saying, "Since the negro and the southern white man were reared together, by voting alike I thought the objectionable race prejudice would readily come to a close. We are all here and what is one's interest is the others."

An engraving was made of him that is held in the collection of the New York Public Library.
