= Denny Sumpter =

American lawyer

Denny Sumpter is a lawyer and former state legislator in Arkansas. He lived in West Memphis. He represented Crittenden County.

He was part of a delegation that visited Tanzania.
