= Randy Laverty =

American politician

Member of the Arkansas Senate from the 2nd district
- In office January 13, 2003 – January 2013
- Preceded by: Jodie Mahony

Member of the Arkansas House of Representatives from the 23rd district
- In office January 9, 1995 – January 8, 2001
- Preceded by: Wayne Wagner
- Succeeded by: Phillip Jackson

Personal details
- Born: March 8, 1953 (age 73) Pittsburgh, Pennsylvania, U.S.
- Party: Democratic
- Spouse: Virginia Lee
- Children: 3
- Education: Arkansas Tech University (BA)
- Profession: Insurance

Randy Laverty (born March 8, 1953) is a former Democratic member of the Arkansas Senate, who represented the 2nd District from 2003 through 2013. Previously he was a member of the Arkansas House of Representatives from 1995 through 2001.

== Education ==
Laverty obtained his BA from Arkansas Tech University.

== Organizations ==
Laverty is a member of Kiwanis Club.

== Political experience ==
Before Laverty was an Arkansas state senator he was a representative in the Arkansas House of Representatives from 1995 to 2000. Prior to his membership Laverty was a member of Jasper School Board from 1982 to 2000.

== Family ==
Randy Laverty is married to his wife Virginia Lee and together the two have 3 children.

== Religion ==
Laverty is a Baptist.
