= Paul Bookout =

American politician

President pro tempore of the Arkansas Senate
- In office January 10, 2011 – January 29, 2013
- Preceded by: Bob Johnson
- Succeeded by: Michael Lamoureux

Member of the Arkansas Senate
- In office April 14, 2006 – January 29, 2013
- Preceded by: Jerry Bookout
- Succeeded by: John Cooper
- Constituency: 14th district (2006–2013); 21st district (2013)

Member of the Arkansas House of Representatives
- In office January 11, 1999 – January 11, 2005
- Preceded by: Bobby Hogue
- Succeeded by: Dustin McDaniel
- Constituency: 87th district (1999–2003); 75th district (2003–2005)

Personal details
- Born: Paul Jerry Bookout; June 30, 1962 (age 64) El Dorado, Arkansas, U.S.
- Party: Democratic
- Spouse: Sherry Flanigan
- Children: 2
- Parent: Jerry Bookout (father)
- Education: Arkansas State University (BA)
- Occupation: Politician; hospital administrator; funeral director

Paul Jerry Bookout (born June 30, 1962) is an American politician who served as the President pro tempore of the Arkansas Senate from 2011 to 2013, when he resigned from office. A member of the Democratic Party, Bookout served as an Arkansas Representative from 1999 until 2004 and as an Arkansas Senator from 2006 to 2013. Bookout was convicted of wire fraud in 2014.

== Early life and education ==
Paul Bookout was born on June 30, 1962, in El Dorado, Arkansas, to Jerry and Loretta (née Langford) Bookout. He graduated from Arkansas State University.

== Political career ==
Bookout served in the Arkansas House of Representatives from 1999 to 2004, when he was elected to fill the seat of his father, Jerry, who had held the seat from 1973 to 1997, and again from 2003 until his death. Paul Bookout then served in the Arkansas Senate from 2006 until 2013 during which time he also served as the President pro tempore of the Senate from 2011 to 2013.

== Criminal investigation and resignation ==
Bookout resigned as the President pro tempore and as an Arkansas Senator in 2013 after it was discovered he spent campaign funds on personal expenses.

On March 11, 2015, Bookout entered a negotiated plea in federal court to a felony mail fraud count for using interstate communications to file a false report in the scheme. On March 2, 2016, he was sentenced to 18 months in federal prison. U.S. District Judge Brian Miller also ordered Bookout to pay $150,048 in restitution, according to court records. He reported to prison on May 2, 2016. Under the agreement Bookout was ordered to pay about $150,158, though it is not certain who will get the money, the state or contributors.

The crime could have carried a sentence up to 20 years. Judge Brian Miller noted he could depart from guidelines, in either direction. The amount he owes is the amount from two campaign cycles studied by prosecutors within the three-year period under which charges could be filed. But he spent far more over the years in a similar manner. Bookout was released from prison on July 17, 2017.

== See also ==
- List of 2010s American state and local politicians convicted of crimes

Arkansas House of Representatives
Preceded by Bobby Hogue	Member of the Arkansas House of Representatives from the 87th district 1999–2002	Succeeded by Sarah Agee
Preceded by Jerry Taylor	Member of the Arkansas House of Representatives from the 75th district 2003–2004	Succeeded by Dustin McDaniel
Arkansas Senate
Preceded by Jerry Bookout	Member of the Arkansas Senate from the 14th district 2006–2012	Succeeded by Bill Sample
Preceded by Steve Harrelson	Member of the Arkansas Senate from the 21st district 2013–2013	Succeeded by John Cooper
