= Bob Johnson (Arkansas state senator) =

American politician

President pro tempore of the Arkansas Senate
- In office January 12, 2009 – January 10, 2011
- Preceded by: Jack Critcher
- Succeeded by: Paul Bookout

Member of the Arkansas Senate
- In office January 8, 2001 – January 10, 2011
- Preceded by: Allen Gordon
- Succeeded by: Jason Rapert
- Constituency: 25th district (2001–2003); 18th district (2003–2011)

80th Speaker of the Arkansas House of Representatives
- In office January 11, 1999 – January 8, 2001
- Preceded by: Bobby Hogue
- Succeeded by: Shane Broadway

Member of the Arkansas House of Representatives from the 31st district
- In office January 9, 1995 – January 8, 2001
- Preceded by: Armil O. Curran
- Succeeded by: Charles L. Ormond

Personal details
- Born: October 23, 1962 (age 63) Little Rock, Arkansas, U.S.
- Party: Democratic
- Education: Bigelow High School; University of Arkansas at Little Rock

Bob Johnson (born October 23, 1962) is a Democratic former member of the Arkansas Senate and of the Arkansas House of Representatives. He was President Pro Tempore of the Senate for the 87th General Assembly session from 2009 to 2011.

== Background ==
Johnson was born in the state capital, Little Rock. He is a graduate of Bigelow High School and has a bachelor's degree in political science from the University of Arkansas at Little Rock.

He resides in Bigelow in Perry County with his wife and three children. He is a partner with his two brothers in several family businesses, including construction. His church affiliation is Baptist.

== Political career ==
He served three terms in the Arkansas House of Representatives from 1995 through 2000. He was House Speaker in 1999 and 2000. Thirty-five at the time he became Speaker, he was then youngest man in Arkansas history to hold that position. Johnson is one of a handful of Arkansas legislators who have served both as Speaker of the House and as President Pro Tem of the Senate.

Johnson served in the Senate from 2001 to 2011, when he retired because of term limits. He represented Senate District 18, which comprises Conway, Perry, and Van Buren counties and portions of Cleburne, Faulkner, Pope, and Saline counties. As Senate President Pro Tem, he was in line to be acting governor when both the governor and the lieutenant governor are out of the state at the same time. He was a member of the Senate Committee on Insurance and Commerce and the Senate Committee on Transportation, Technology and Legislative Affairs, as well as the Joint Budget Committee, the Joint Performance Review Committee and the Senate Efficiency Committee.
