= James Luker =

American politician and lawyer

James Charles Luker (born February 4, 1942) is an American politician and lawyer.

Born in Little Rock, Arkansas, Luker received his Juris Doctor degree from the University of Arkansas School of Law. He practiced law in Wynne, Arkansas and served as city attorney and mayor of Wynne, Arkansas. From 1995 to 2001, Luker served in the Arkansas House of Representatives. Then, from 2001 to 2011, Luker served in the Arkansas State Senate. Luker was a Democrat. Luker also served as a U.S. Bankruptcy Court referee for the Eastern District of Arkansas.
