= Mary Anne Salmon =

American politician

Member of the Arkansas Senate from the 31st district
- In office January 13, 2003 – January 14, 2013
- Preceded by: Paul Miller
- Succeeded by: Joyce Elliott

Member of the Arkansas House of Representatives from the 61st district
- In office January 11, 1999 – January 13, 2003
- Preceded by: James Dietz
- Succeeded by: Jeff Gillespie

Personal details
- Born: April 9, 1939 (age 87) Fort Smith, Arkansas, U.S.
- Party: Democratic

Mary Anne Salmon (born April 9, 1939) is an American politician who served in the Arkansas House of Representatives from the 61st district from 1999 to 2003 and in the Arkansas Senate from the 31st district from 2003 to 2013.

She is a native of Fort Smith, Arkansas. She attended Arkansas Tech University. She taught music. She and her husband Don are the parents of two daughters. She represented North Little Rock, Arkansas.
