= Jim Argue =

American politician (1951–2018)

Member of the Arkansas Senate
- In office January 13, 1997 – January 2009
- Preceded by: Jim Keet
- Succeeded by: David Johnson
- Constituency: 15th district (1997–2003); 32nd district (2003–2009)

Member of the Arkansas House of Representatives
- In office January 1991 – January 13, 1997
- Preceded by: Ron Fuller
- Succeeded by: Jim Magnus
- Constituency: 56th district (1991–1993); 55th district (1993–1997)

Personal details
- Born: James Buckingham Argue Jr. August 19, 1951 Carthage, Texas, U.S.
- Died: May 3, 2018 (aged 66) Little Rock, Arkansas, U.S.
- Party: Democratic
- Spouse: Elise Carey
- Education: Hendrix College (BA)
- Occupation: Administration

James Buckingham Argue Jr. (August 19, 1951 – May 3, 2018) was the President Pro Tempore of the Arkansas State Senate, United States. He was a Democratic member of the Arkansas Senate, representing the 32nd District from 1996 to 2008. Previously he was a member of the Arkansas House of Representatives from 1991 through 1996

Argue attended Little Rock Public Schools, graduated from Little Rock Hall High School, and earned a bachelor's degree in history and political science from Hendrix College in 1973.

Jim served in the Arkansas House of Representatives for six years prior to being elected to the State Senate in 1996. He was re-elected to the Senate in 2000 and 2002. He was Chairman of the Senate Education Committee. He served on the State Agencies and Governmental Affairs Committee, the Joint Budget Committee, the Joint Energy Committee, the Legislative Joint Audit Committee, the Legislative Council and the Senate Efficiency Committee. His colleagues designated him to serve as President Pro Tempore of the Senate for the 85th General Assembly.

Argue was named a Flemming Fellow in 1997 by the Center For Policy Alternatives in Washington, D.C. and completed a year-long course of study focused on creative solutions to state problems. He has served two terms as a director of the Southwest Educational Development Laboratory in Austin, Texas, and is a member of the Advisory Board of the Southern Regional Education Board in Atlanta, Georgia.

In 1981 Jim became President of the United Methodist Foundation of Arkansas. Under his leadership, foundation assets have grown from $67,000 to over $76,000,000. The foundation develops and administers charitable endowment funds to support United Methodist ministries in Arkansas.

He is past Chairman of the Administrative Board of Pulaski Heights United Methodist Church in Little Rock. He is a fellow of the Leadership Institute of Little Rock and has received the organization's Distinguished Leadership Award. He is past president of the board of Good Shepherd Ecumenical Retirement Center. He serves on the boards of St. Vincent Medical Center and the National Conference for Community and Justice. He received the NCCJ's Father Joseph Biltz award in 2000. He serves on the boards of the Arkansas Travelers Baseball Club and the Arkansas Historical Society.

Argue was married to Elise Carey Argue, and they have two daughters; Sarah and Emily. Elise is a former Co-President of the Central High School Parent Teacher Association. He died of kidney cancer in Little Rock on May 3, 2018.
