= Cecile Bledsoe =

American politician (born 1944)

Cecile Herndon Bledsoe (born June 26, 1944) is a former member of the Arkansas House of Representatives and Arkansas Senate. A Republican, ahe served in the Arkansas House in 1999, 2001, 2003 and in the Arkansas Senate in 2009, 2011, 2013, 2015, 2017, 2019, and 2021. She has lived in Rogers, Arkansas. for decades.

She is from Brunswick, Georgia. She is married to Dr. Jim Bledsoe and has three children and 10 grandchildren. She was involved in healthcare legislation, a tax cut, and legislation for electric charging stations for vehicles. She represented eastern Benton County, Arkansas.
