= Wayne Dowd =

American politician

Member of the Arkansas Senate
- In office 1978–2000

Personal details
- Born: Clark Wayne Dowd; November 1, 1941 Texarkana, Arkansas, U.S.
- Died: June 16, 2016 (aged 74) Hot Springs, Arkansas, U.S.
- Resting place: Texarkana, Arkansas, U.S.
- Party: Democratic
- Education: Southern Arkansas University (BBA); University of Arkansas School of Law (LLB)
- Profession: Politician, lawyer

Clark Wayne Dowd (November 1, 1941 – June 16, 2016) was an American politician and lawyer.

Born in Texarkana, Arkansas, Dowd graduated from Southern Arkansas University and University of Arkansas School of Law. Dowd practiced law in Texarkana, Arkansas. From 1978 to 2000, Dowd served in the Arkansas Senate and was a Democrat. Dowd died in Hot Springs, Arkansas, while attending the Arkansas Bar Association annual meeting.
