= List of people from Arkansas =

List of notable people from Arkansas, United States

State flag of Arkansas

Location of Arkansas in the United States

This is a list of notable people from Arkansas. Individuals on this list are either native-born Arkansans or migrants who moved to Arkansas as their permanent home.

== Actors ==
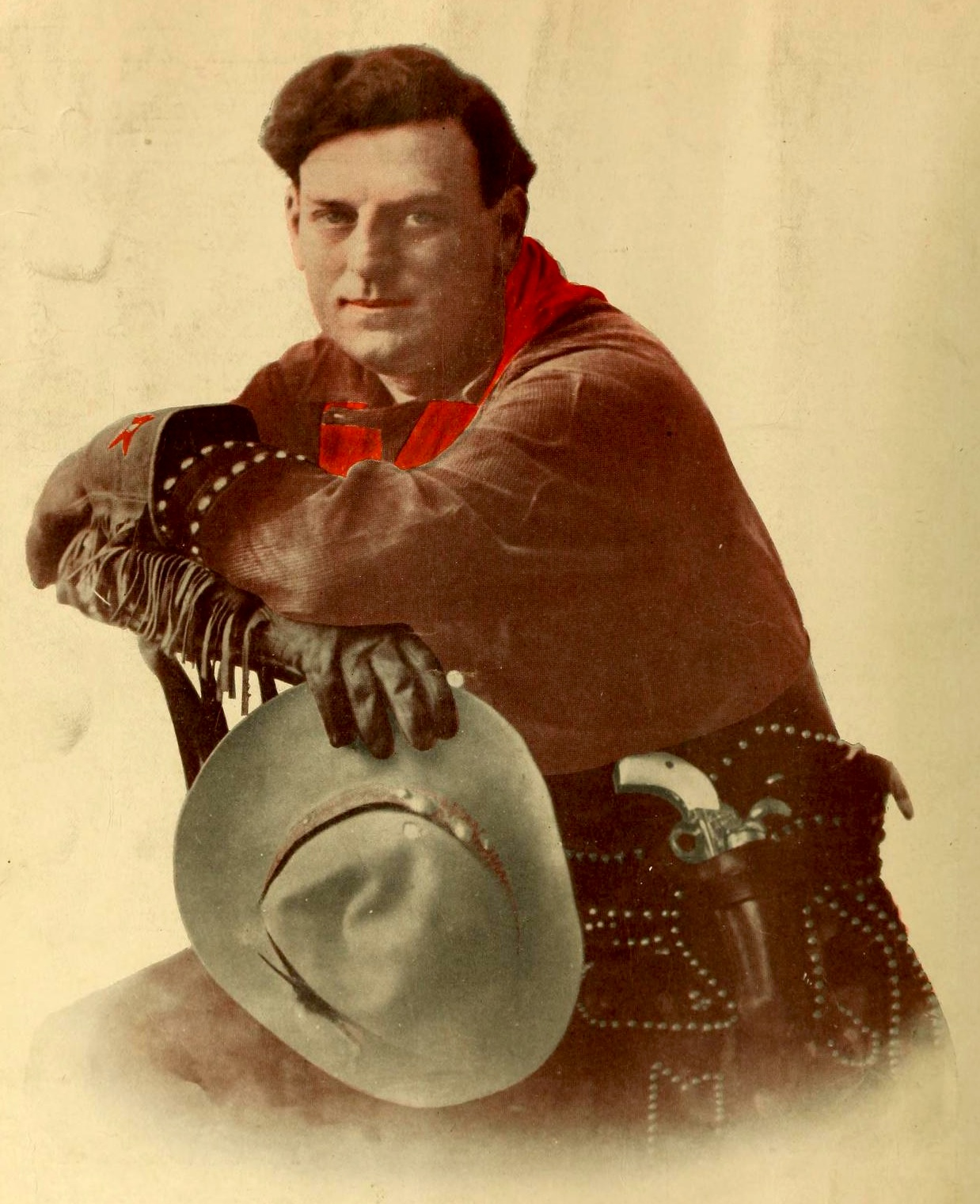
Bronco Billy Anderson

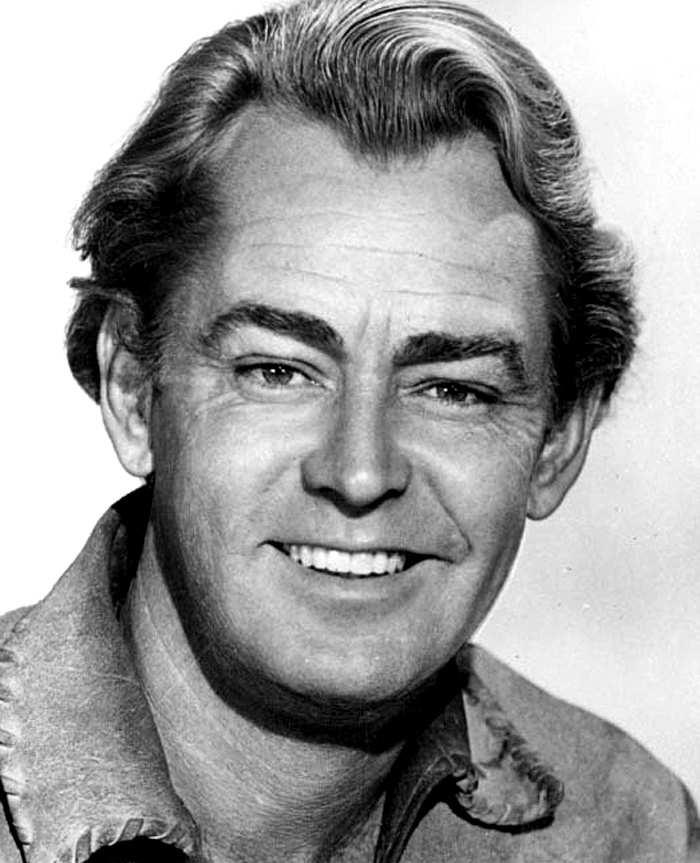
Alan Ladd

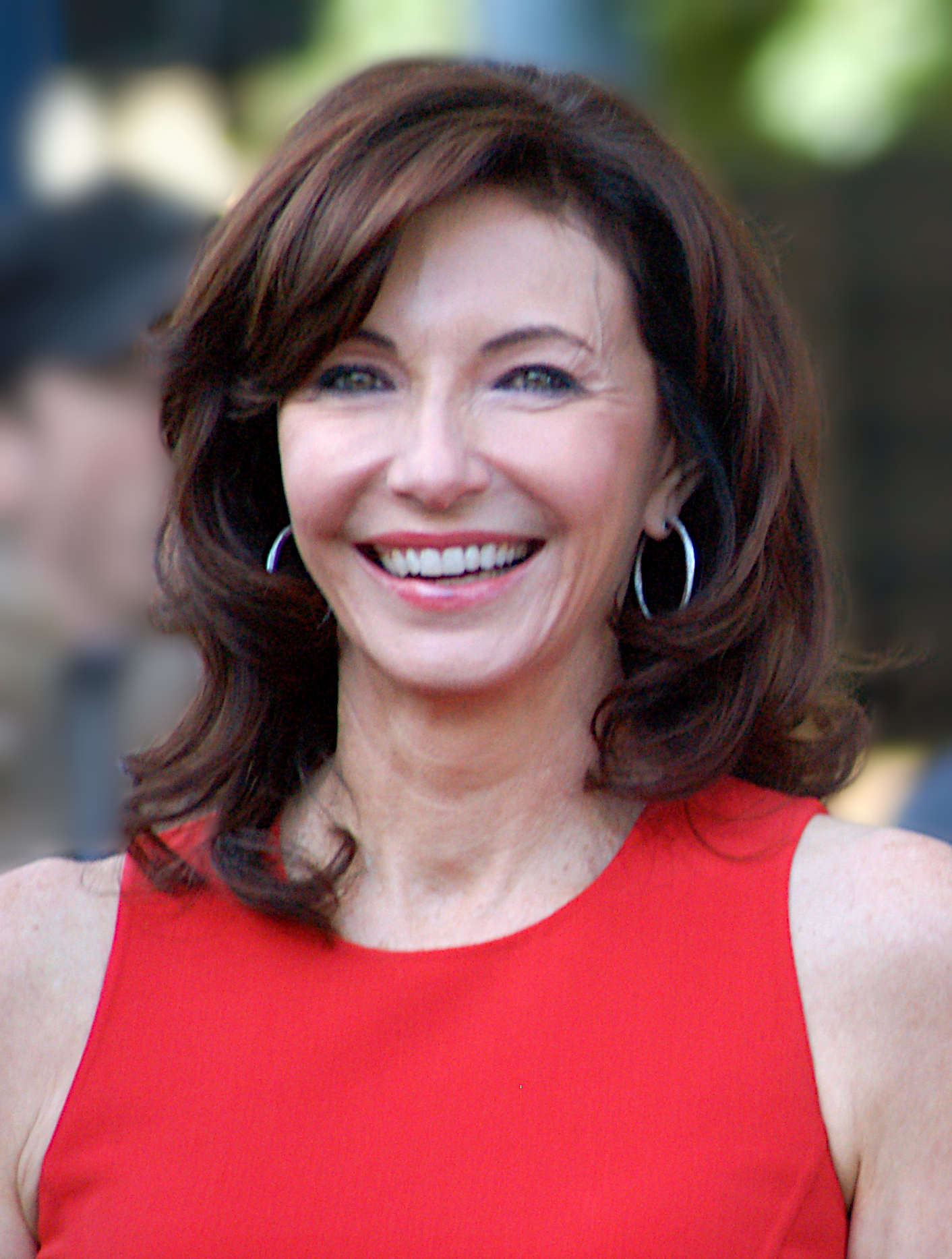
Mary Steenburgen

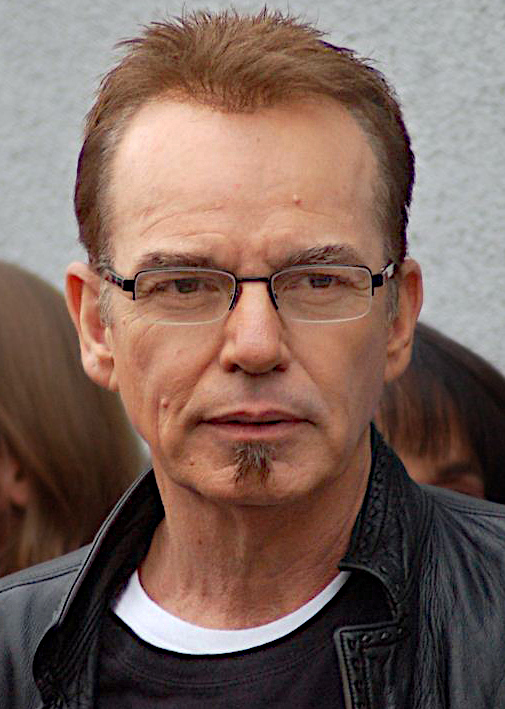
Billy Bob Thornton

- Joey Lauren Adams (born 1968), actress
- Katherine Alexander (1898–1981), actress
- Bronco Billy Anderson (1880–1971), vaudeville actor
- Wes Bentley (born 1978), actor
- Rodger Bumpass (born 1951), actor, best known for voicing Squidward Tentacles from the animated series SpongeBob SquarePants
- Miriam Byrd-Nethery (1929–2003), actress
- Natalie Canerday (born 1962), actress, Sling Blade, October Sky
- John Carter (1927–2015), actor, originally from Conway County
- Daniel Davis (born 1945), actor, best known as "Niles the butler" on television series The Nanny
- Gail Davis (1925–1997), film actress, best known as Annie Oakley from 1950s television series
- Clark Duke (born 1985), actor, Greek, Hearts Afire
- Kimberly Foster (born 1961), actress, Dallas
- Gauge (born 1980), adult film actress
- Gil Gerard (born 1943), actor
- Norris Goff (1906–1978), actor, best known as Abner of Lum and Abner
- Elizabeth Gracen (born 1961), actress, Highlander: The Raven
- Tess Harper (born 1950), actress
- Georgia Holt (1926–2022), actress, singer; mother of Cher
- Arthur Hunnicutt (1910–1979), actor, known for his portrayal of wise, grizzled, old rural characters
- Brent Jennings (born 1969)
- Brandon Keener (born 1974), actor
- Donnie Keshawarz (born 1969), actor
- Alan Ladd (1913–1964), actor
- Chester Lauck (1902–1980), actor, best known as Lum of Lum and Abner
- Marjorie Lawrence (1907–1979), actress, Metropolitan Opera diva
- Jacob Lofland (born 1996), actor
- Josh Lucas (born 1971), actor
- Laurence Luckinbill (born 1934), actor
- Rudy Ray Moore (1927–2008), actor
- Ben Murphy (born 1942), actor, Alias Smith and Jones, Lottery!
- Corin Nemec (born 1971), actor
- George Newbern (born 1964), actor
- Dick Powell (1904–1963), actor and director; founder of Four Star Television
- William Ragsdale (born 1961), actor, Herman's Head, Grosse Pointe
- Leon Russom (born 1941), actor, Prison Break
- Wonderful Smith (1911–2008), actor and comedian
- Norman Snow (1950–2022), actor
- Mary Steenburgen (born 1953), Oscar-winning actress
- Kobe Tai (born 1972), adult film actress
- Billy Bob Thornton (born 1955), actor, Oscar-winning screenwriter
- Karri Turner (born 1966), actress
- Karmyn Tyler (born 1974), actress
- Sheryl Underwood (born 1963), actress, comedian, radio host
- Jerry Van Dyke (1931–2018), actor, comedian, brother of Dick Van Dyke; resided on his ranch near Malvern

== Artists ==
- Larry D. Alexander (born 1953), artist and writer
- Danielle Bunten Berry (1949–1998), video game designer
- John Braden (1949–2004), writer, producer, director
- Roy Buchanan (1939–1988), guitarist, singer, songwriter
- Carl Ward Dudley (1910–1973), filmmaker and producer
- George Fisher (1923–2003), political cartoonist
- David Gordon Green (born 1975), filmmaker
- Kenneth Johnson (born 1942), screenwriter, director
- E. Fay Jones (1921–2004), architect and designer
- Oliver Lake (born 1942), jazz saxophonist, flutist, composer, poet, and visual artist
- Amy Lee (born 1981), lead singer of Evanescence
- Evan Lindquist (1936–2023), artist, printmaker, Artist Laureate of Arkansas
- Nate Powell (born 1978), comic book artist
- Effie Anderson Smith (1869–1955), impressionist landscape painter, educator, feminist
- Symone (born 1995), model, actress, winner of RuPaul's Drag Race
- Harry Thomason (born 1940), television producer
- Jason Truby (born 1973), former lead guitarist for Living Sacrifice and former member of P.O.D.
- Edward Washburn (1831–1860), painter of The Arkansas Traveler
- Donald Roller Wilson (born 1938), painter

== Authors ==
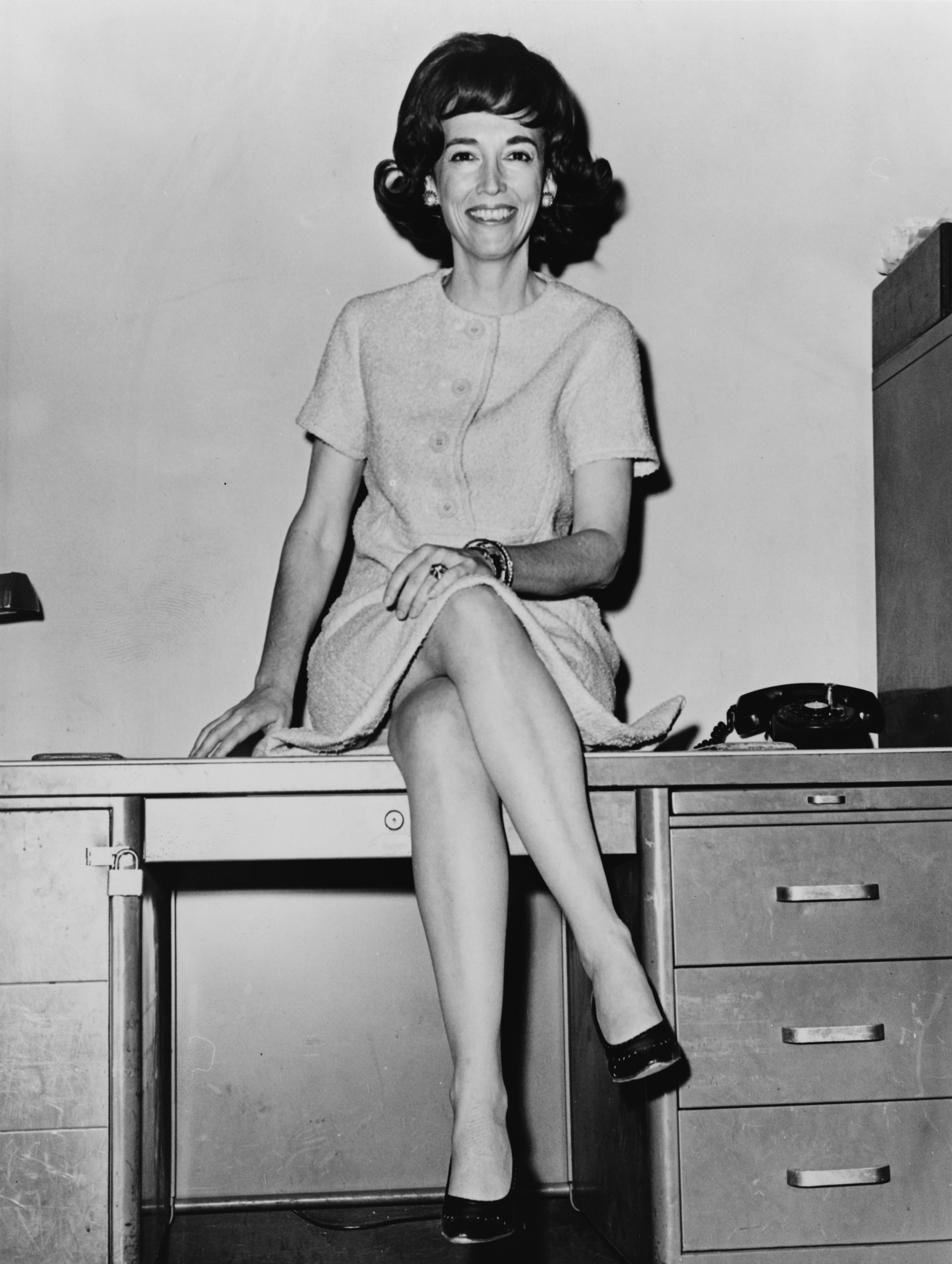
Helen Gurley Brown

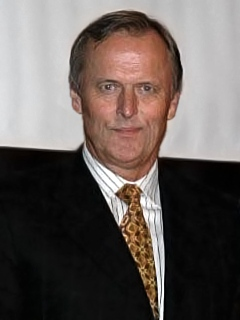
John Grisham

- Margot Adler (1946–2014), journalist and correspondent
- Brian Biggs (born 1968), author, illustrator, graphic artist
- Dee Brown (1908–2002), author, historian, novelist
- Helen Gurley Brown (1922–2012), author, editor-in-chief of Cosmopolitan magazine
- Nancy A. Collins (born 1959), author
- John Gould Fletcher (1886–1950), poet
- John Grisham (born 1955), novelist
- Dave Grossman (born 1956), author
- Laurell K. Hamilton (born 1963), horror/fantasy author
- Deborah Mathis (born 1953), journalist and author
- Peter McGehee (1955–1991), novelist
- Qui Nguyen, playwright and screenwriter
- Charles Portis (1933–2020), novelist
- Leora Bettison Robinson (1840–1914), writer
- John Robert Starr (1927–2000), journalist
- Gina Wilkins (born 1954), novelist
- Miller Williams (1930–2015), poet
- C. Vann Woodward (1908–1999), historian
- Carolyn D. Wright (1949–2016), poet

== Businesspeople ==
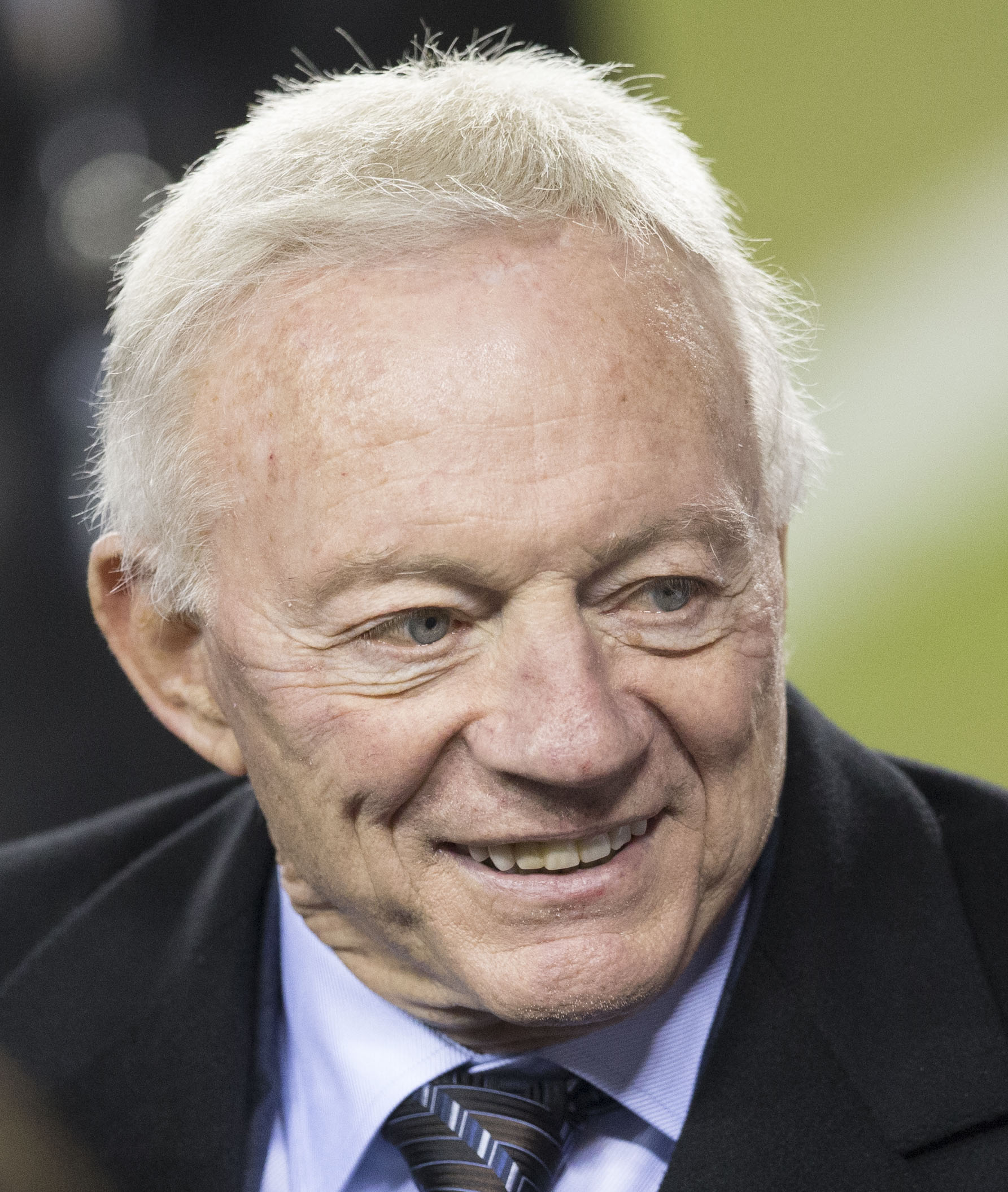
Jerry Jones

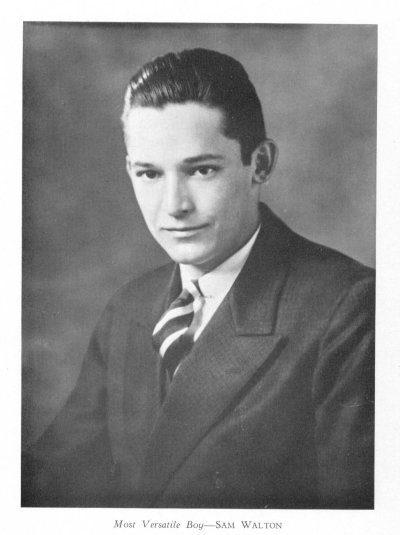
Sam Walton

- William T. Dillard (1914–2002), head of Dillard's Department Stores
- Max Frauenthal (1836–1914), Confederate Civil War veteran, leading Conway merchant, and founding father of Heber Springs
- Johnelle Hunt (born 1932), co-founder of J. B. Hunt Transportation Services
- Johnnie Bryan Hunt (1927–2006), co-founder of J. B. Hunt Transportation Services
- Walter E. Hussman Jr. (born 1947), founder of WEHCO Media, Inc.
- John Harold Johnson (1918–2005), founder of Johnson Publishing Company
- Jerry Jones (born 1942), owner of the Dallas Cowboys since 1989
- Stephen Jones (born 1964), executive vice president/COO of the Dallas Cowboys
- James Smith McDonnell (1899–1980), founder of McDonnell Aircraft
- Charles Phillips (born 1959), CEO of Infor Global Solutions
- Jackson T. Stephens (1923–2005), oilman and investment banker
- Warren Stephens (born 1957), president, chairman, and CEO of Stephens Inc.
- Don Tyson (1930–2011), Tyson Foods Poultry processing
- John H. Tyson (born 1953), former CEO of Tyson Foods
- Alice Walton (born 1949), daughter of Sam Walton, founded Llama Company
- Jim Walton (born 1948), son of Sam Walton, chairman of Arvest Bank
- John T. Walton (1946–2005), son of Sam Walton, former chairman of True North Venture Partners
- Rob Walton (born 1944), son of Sam Walton, former chairman of Walmart
- Sam Walton (1918–1992), founder of Wal-Mart Inc.
- Kemmons Wilson (1913–2003), Holiday Inn hotel founder
- Forrest L. Wood (1932–2020), founder of Ranger Boats

== Military figures ==
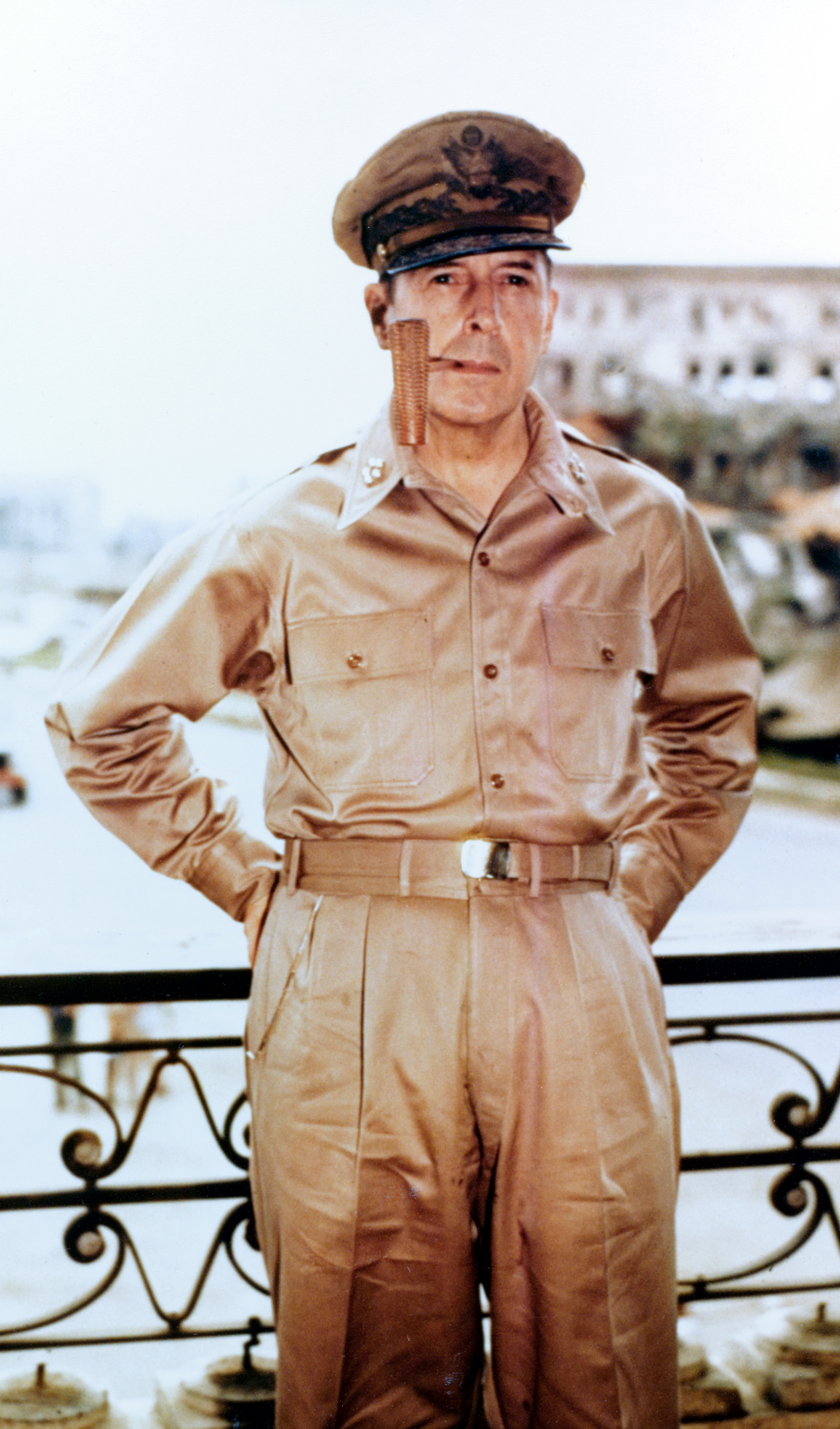
Douglas MacArthur

- John Hanks Alexander (1864–1894), pioneering African-American naval officer
- Nicky Daniel Bacon (1945–2010), first sergeant, U.S. Army, Medal of Honor recipient, Distinguished Service Cross, the Legion of Merit, two Bronze Stars and two Purple Hearts; director of the Arkansas Department of Veterans Affairs, United States delegate to normalize relations with Vietnam, president of the Congressional Medal of Honor Society, chair emeritus of the American Board for Certification in Homeland Security, Military Police Hall of Fame
- William N. R. Beall (1825–1883), Confederate brigadier general
- Raynal Bolling (1877–1918), first high-ranking U.S. Army casualty in WWI
- Solon Borland (1808–1864), Confederate brigadier general
- Maurice "Footsie" Britt (1919–1995), World War II soldier, Medal of Honor recipient, Distinguished Service Cross recipient, Silver Star recipient, first American soldier to receive the three highest medals for bravery; NFL player; lt. governor of Arkansas
- William L. Cabell (1827–1911), Confederate brigadier general
- Thomas J. Churchill (1824–1905), Confederate major general
- Wesley Clark (born 1944), U.S. Army general, NATO commander
- Patrick Cleburne (1828–1864), Confederate major general
- James Conway (born 1947), U.S. Marine Corps lieutenant general
- William Orlando Darby (1911–1945), first commander of the U.S. Army Rangers
- Herman Davis (1888–1923), Distinguished Service Cross recipient and World War I sniper
- Thomas P. Dockery (1833–1898), Confederate brigadier general
- Edward Walter Eberle (1864–1929), U.S. Navy chief of Naval Operations
- James F. Fagan (1827–1893), Confederate major general
- Nathan G. Gordon (1916–2008), USN PBY pilot, received Medal of Honor for rescuing 15 downed aircrew members by landing his aircraft under enemy fire
- Daniel C. Govan (1829–1911), Confederate brigadier general
- Carlos Hathcock (1942–1999), Marine sniper
- Alexander T. Hawthorn (1825–1899), Confederate brigadier general
- Thomas Hindman (1828–1868), U.S. congressman and Confederate major general
- Lucius Roy Holbrook (1875–1952), U.S. major general
- George Izard (1776–1828), U.S. Army general, War of 1812
- Field E. Kindley (1896–1920), World War I flying ace
- Douglas MacArthur (1880–1964), U.S. general of the Army, Medal of Honor recipient
- Ewell Ross McCright (1907–1990), U.S. Air Force captain, World War II, prisoner of war and Legion of Merit recipient
- Pierce McKennon (1919–1947), World War II fighter ace veteran of RAF Eagle Squadron, 335thFS/4thFG, 20 German aircraft destroyed
- Evander McNair (1820–1902), Confederate brigadier general
- Dandridge McRae (1829–1899), Confederate brigadier general
- Albert Pike (1809–1891), Confederate general, Freemason
- John S. Roane (1817–1867), brigadier general
- Albert Rust (1818–1870), Confederate brigadier general
- James C. Tappan (1825–1906), Confederate brigadier general
- John Thach (1905–1981), U.S. Navy admiral, World War II flying ace
- Frank Glasgow Tinker (1909–1939), Spanish Civil War volunteer fighter pilot
- Corydon M. Wassell (1884–1958), U.S. Navy physician and medical missionary
- Archibald Yell (1797–1847), brigadier general, killed at the Battle of Buena Vista during the Mexican–American War

== Musicians ==
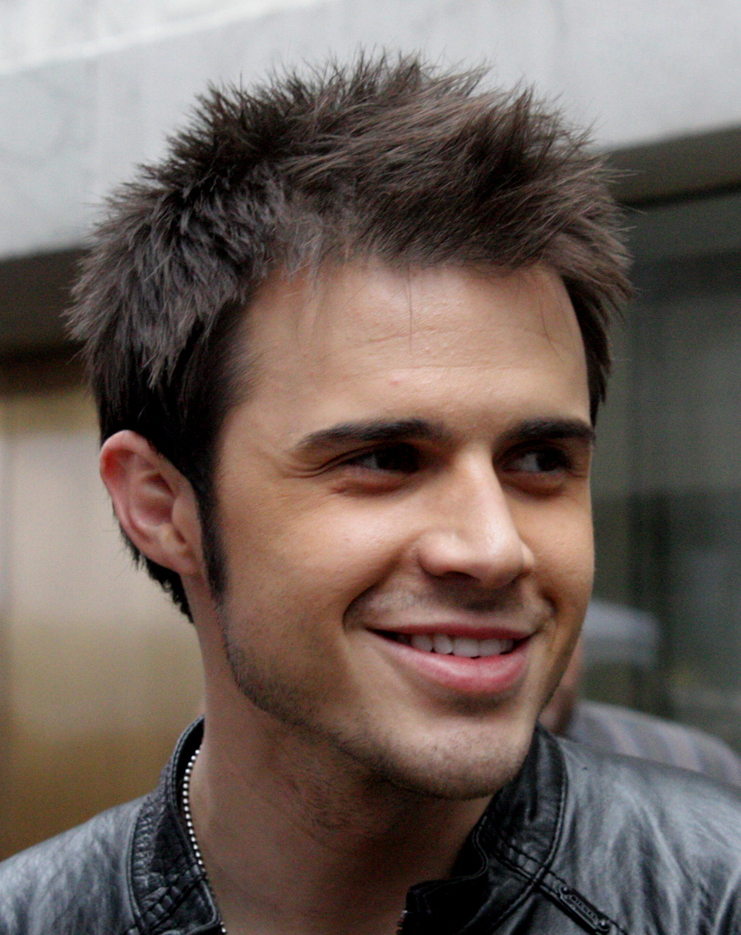
Kris Allen

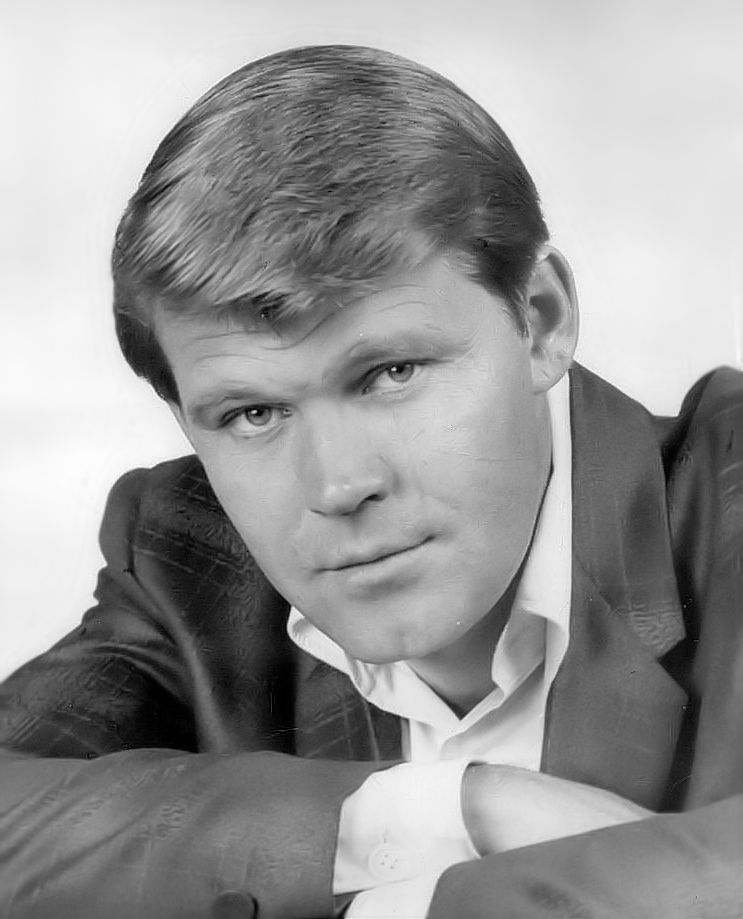
Glen Campbell

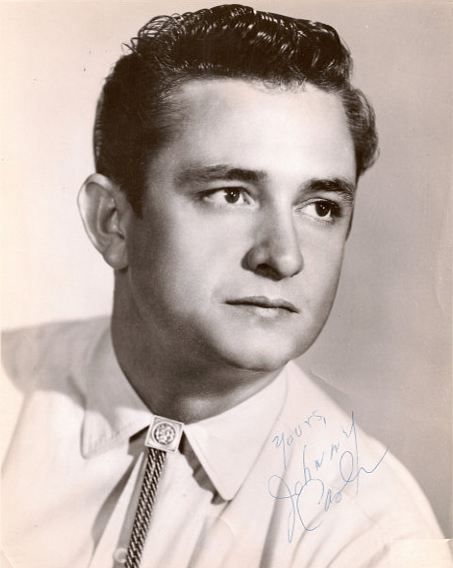
Johnny Cash

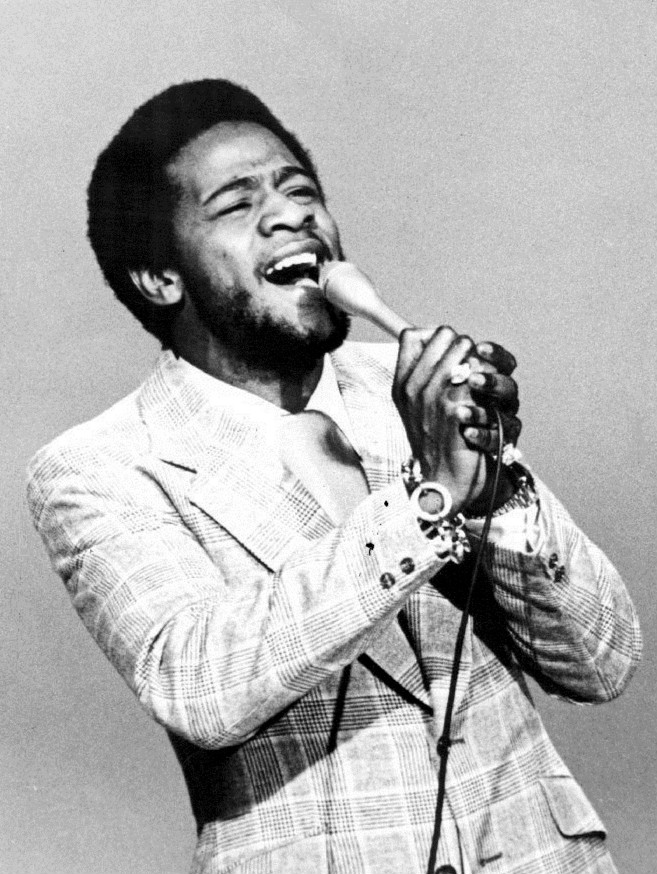
Al Green

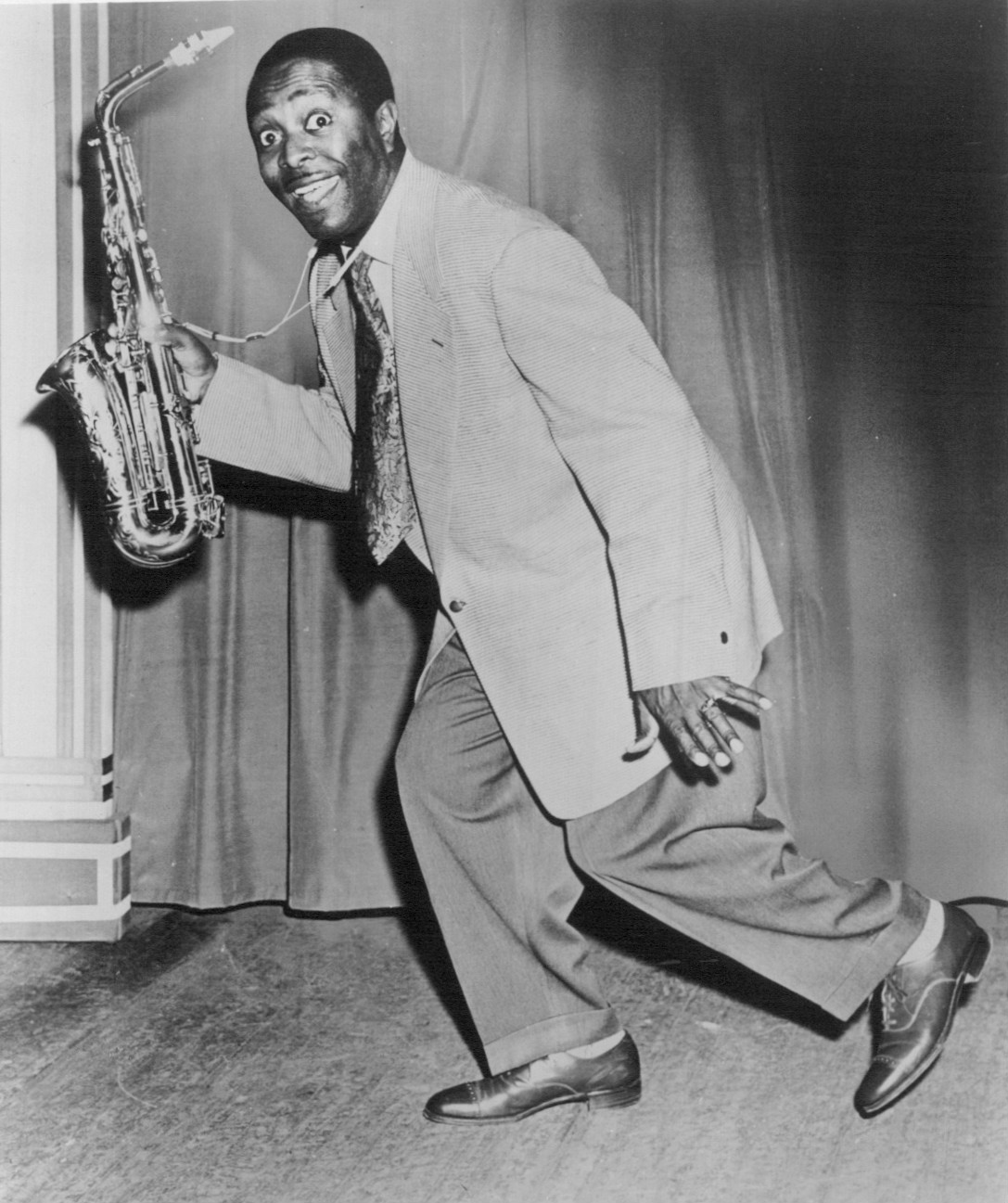
Louis Jordan

- Kris Allen (born 1985), singer-songwriter, winner of the 8th season of American Idol
- Black Oak Arkansas (formed 1963), Southern rock hillybilly psycho-boogie band
- Big Bill Broonzy (1903–1958), blues singer-songwriter and guitarist
- Shirley Brown (born 1947), soul singer
- Sonny Burgess (1929–2017), Sun recording artist
- Sarah Caldwell (1924–2006), opera conductor and director, violinist
- Shawn Camp (born 1966), singer/songwriter
- Glen Campbell (1936–2017), country singer-songwriter, and actor
- Johnny Cash (1932–2003), country singer-songwriter
- Floyd Cramer (1933–1997), musician, most known for his piano instrumental "Last Date"
- Roscoe Dash (born 1990), rapper
- Iris DeMent (born 1961), country/folk singer-songwriter
- Jim Dickinson (1941–2009), musician and producer
- Beth Ditto (born 1981), singer with The Gossip
- Bob Dorough (1923–2018), jazz musician and voice of Schoolhouse Rock!
- Jimmy Driftwood (1907–1998), folk musician/songwriter, wrote "The Battle of New Orleans"
- Barbara Fairchild (born 1950), country and gospel singer
- Tav Falco (born 1945), musical performer, performance artist, actor, filmmaker, and photographer
- Sandford C. Faulkner (1803–1874), wrote fiddle tune "Arkansas Traveler"
- Bankroll Freddie (born 1994), rapper
- Lefty Frizzell (1928–1975), country music singer-songwriter
- Al Green (born 1946), singer
- Charles Christian Hammer (1953–2004), classical guitarist
- Ronnie Hawkins (1935–2022), rock musician
- Levon Helm (1940–2012), rock musician
- Barbara Hendricks (born 1948), opera singer
- John S. Hilliard (1947–2019), composer
- Wayland Holyfield (born 1942), songwriter
- Buddy Jewell (born 1961), country musician
- Louis Jordan (1908–1975), jazz musician and bandleader
- Tracy Lawrence (born 1968), country musician
- Amy Lee (born 1981), rock musician
- Robert Lockwood Jr. (1915–2006), blues musician
- W. Francis McBeth (1933–2012), composer
- Ashley McBryde (born 1983), country singer
- Robert McFerrin (1921–2006), operatic baritone
- Patsy Montana (1914–1996), country musician
- Ben Moody (born 1980), rock musician
- Justin Moore (born 1984), country musician
- Charlotte Moorman (1933–1991), cellist, performance artist
- Conlon Nancarrow (1912–1997), composer
- Ne-Yo (born 1979), R&B musician, songwriter
- Joe Nichols (born 1976), country music artist
- Smokie Norful (born 1975), gospel singer (reared in Arkansas)
- Walter Norris (1931–2011), pianist and composer
- K.T. Oslin (1942–2020), country musician
- Twila Paris (born 1958), gospel musician
- Art Porter Jr. (1961–1996), jazz saxophonist
- Art Porter, Sr. (1934–1993), jazz pianist
- Florence Price (1887–1953), composer
- Collin Raye (born 1960), country musician
- Wilbur Stephen "Bill" Rice (1939–2023), country musician
- Charlie Rich (1932–1995), rockabilly, jazz, blues, country, and gospel musician and pianist
- Pharoah Sanders (1940–2022), jazz saxophonist
- W. Stephen Smith (born 1950), baritone opera singer, voice teacher and author
- William Grant Still (1895–1978), composer
- Fred Tackett (born 1945), songwriter and multi-instrumentalist
- Johnnie Taylor (1934–2000), vocalist
- Sister Rosetta Tharpe (1915–1973), vocalist, guitarist, the first great recording star of gospel music, considered "the Godmother of rock and roll"
- Conway Twitty (1933–1993), rock and roll and country music singer
- Michael Utley (born 1985), songwriter, actor, musician, bit actor, member of Jimmy Buffett and the Coral Reefer Band and Club Trini
- Viper (born 1971), rapper, producer
- Junior Walker (1931–1995), Motown saxophonist
- William Warfield (1920–2002), vocalist
- Lenny Williams (born 1945), singer
- Otis Williams (born 1941), singer
- Sonny Boy Williamson II (1899–1965), blues musician

== Political figures ==
Bill Clinton

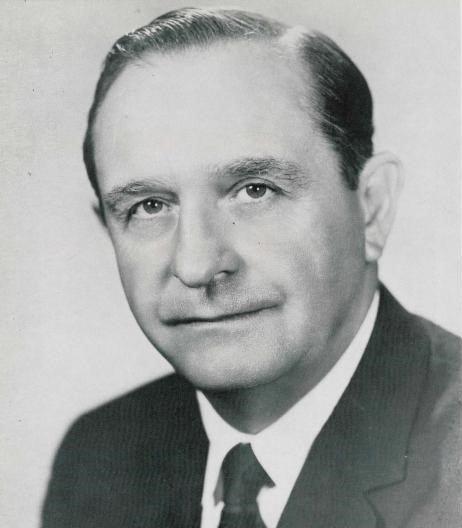
Orval Faubus

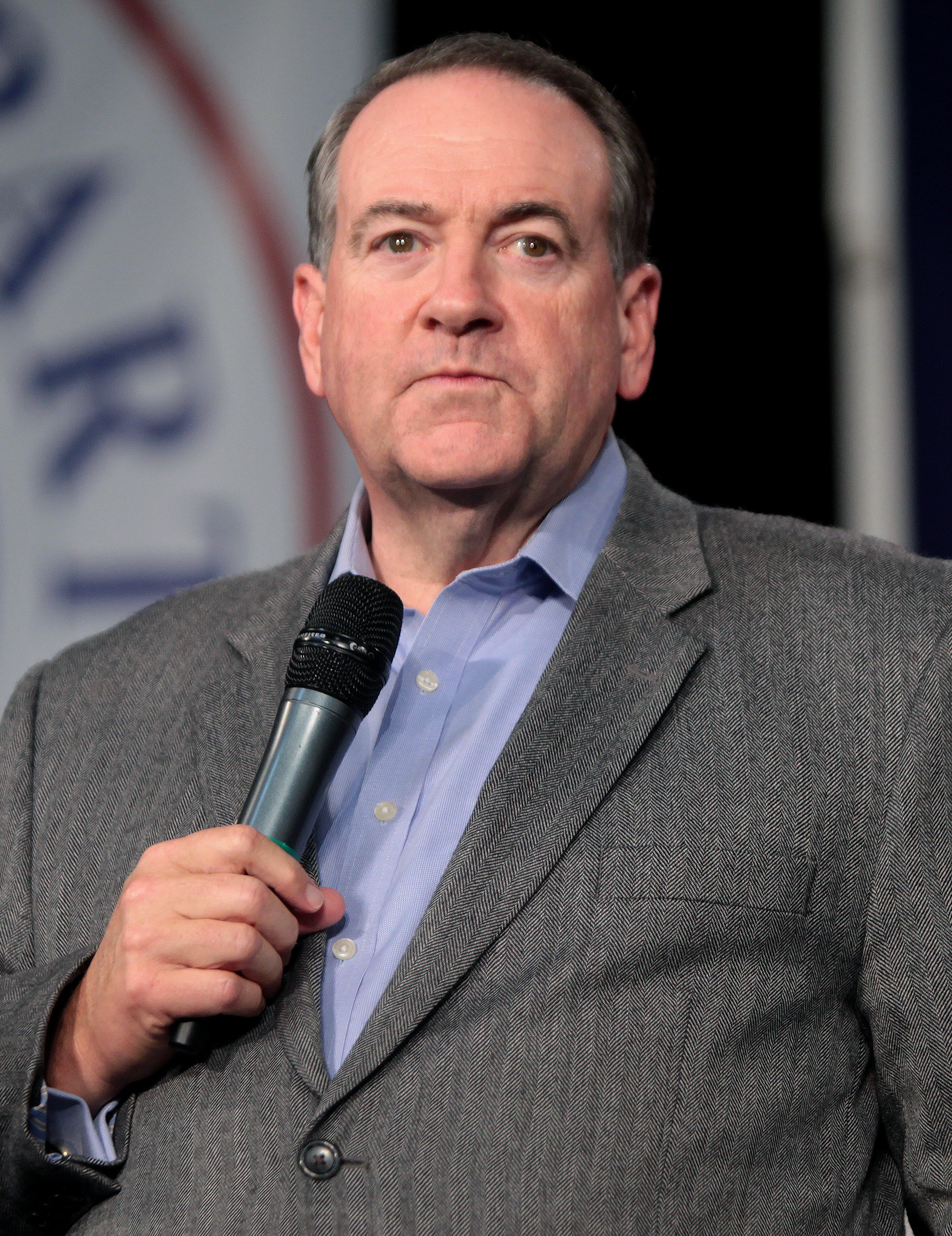
Mike Huckabee

A–B

- William Vollie Alexander Jr. (born 1934), Democratic U.S. representative 1969–1993
- Dale Alford (1916–2000), U.S. representative from Little Rock 1959–1963; unsuccessful gubernatorial candidate in Democratic primary in 1962 and 1966
- Denny Altes (born 1948), former member of both houses of the Arkansas State Legislature; Vietnam War veteran from Fort Smith
- Morris S. Arnold (born 1941), U.S. Appeals Court judge
- Richard S. Arnold (1936–2004), U.S. Appeals Court judge
- Duncan Baird (born 1979), Arkansas state budget director since 2015; Republican former member of the Arkansas House of Representatives
- Bob Ballinger (born 1974), Republican member of the Arkansas House of Representatives for Washington, Carroll, and Madison counties
- Jonathan Barnett (born 1955), state representative for Benton and Washington counties
- Mike Beebe (born 1946), former governor of Arkansas
- Mary Bentley (born 1961), Republican member of the Arkansas House of Representatives for Perry, Pope, Yell, and Conway counties since 2015; businesswoman and former nurse in Perryville
- Edwin Bethune (born 1935), U.S. representative 1979–1985
- Solon Borland (1808–1864), U.S. senator
- Drew Bowers (1886–1985), Republican gubernatorial nominee in 1926 and 1928; assistant U.S. attorney in Little Rock
- David Branscum (born 1958), Republican member of the Arkansas House of Representatives from Searcy County
- Kelly Bryant (1908–1975), secretary of state
- Dale Bumpers (1925–2016), U.S. senator and former governor of Arkansas 1971–1975
- Preston C. Bynum (1939–2018), lobbyist and politician

C–D

- Jim R. Caldwell (born 1936), first Republican to serve in the Arkansas State Senate in the 20th century, 1969–1978; Church of Christ minister retired in Tulsa, Oklahoma
- Ronald R. Caldwell (born 1951), Republican member of the Arkansas State Senate from Cross County
- Hattie Caraway (1878–1951), first woman to serve a full term as a U.S. senator
- Davy Carter (born 1975), speaker of the Arkansas House of Representatives
- Francis Adams Cherry (1908–1965), governor 1953–1955
- Marvin Childers (born 1961), former state representative from Mississippi County, lawyer and lobbyist for poultry industry in Little Rock
- Marshall Chrisman (born 1933), Republican state representative from Franklin and Johnson counties, 1969–1970; gubernatorial candidate, 1980 and 1982
- Alan Clark (born 1960), Arkansas Republican state senator from Garland County
- Ann Clemmer (born 1958), Republican member of the Arkansas House of Representative from Saline County; professor of political science at the University of Arkansas at Little Rock
- Bill Clinton (born 1946), 42nd president of the United States
- Chelsea Clinton (born 1980), daughter of Bill and Hillary
- Hillary Clinton (born 1947), First Lady of the United States (1993–2001), U.S. senator from New York (2001–2009), U.S. secretary of state (2009–2013), and 2016 Democratic nominee for president
- Carl B. Close (1907–1980), Louisiana politician; native of Conway County
- Osro Cobb (1904–1996), lawyer, Republican politician from Montgomery County and later Little Rock
- Sterling R. Cockrill (1925–2022), Republican former politician from Pulaski County; urban planner, businessman, artist
- Henry W. Conway (1793–1827), territorial delegate
- John R. Cooper (born 1947), Republican member of the Arkansas State Senate from Craighead County
- Donnie Copeland (born 1961), Pentecostal pastor in North Little Rock and Republican member of the Arkansas House of Representatives for District 38, 2015–2017
- Tom Cotton (born 1977), U.S. senator from Arkansas since 2015
- Bruce Cozart (born 1955), politician and developer from Hot Springs
- Angie Craig (born 1972), U.S. representative from Minnesota's 2nd congressional district since 2019
- Marion H. Crank (1915–1994), speaker of the Arkansas House, 1963–1964; Democratic gubernatorial nominee, 1968
- Danny K. Davis (born 1941), U.S. representative from Illinois
- Gary Deffenbaugh (born 1949), Republican member of the Arkansas House of Representatives from Van Buren in Crawford County
- Jay Dickey (1939–2017), U.S. representative from Arkansas's 4th congressional district, 1993–2001
- Jim Dotson (born 1978), Republican member of the Arkansas House of Representatives from Bentonville
- Dan Douglas (born 1957), Republican member of the Arkansas House of Representatives from Bentonville
- Trevor Drown (born c. 1970), Republican member of the Arkansas House of Representatives for Pope and Van Buren counties since 2015

E–G

- Lance Eads (born 1968), Republican member of the Arkansas House of Representatives for Washington County since 2015; unseated Randy Alexander in 2014 Republican primary
- Les Eaves (born 1967), Republican member of the Arkansas House of Representatives for White County since 2015
- Joycelyn Elders (born 1933), former surgeon general of the United States
- Jane English (born 1940), member of the Arkansas State Senate from North Little Rock since 2013; former member of the Arkansas House of Representatives
- Jon Eubanks (born 1951), state representative for Logan County since 2011
- Joe Farrer (born 1962), state representative from Lonoke County
- Orval Eugene Faubus (1910–1994), governor 1955–1967
- Jake Files (born 1972), state senator from Fort Smith since 2011
- Charlene Fite (born 1950), Republican state representative for Crawford County since 2013
- Lanny Fite (born c. 1949), Republican state representative for Saline County since 2015, former county judge
- Scott Flippo (born 1980), state senator from Baxter, Boone, and Marion Counties; businessman in Bull Shoals
- Stephanie Flowers (born 1953), state senator from Pine Bluff and former state representative; attorney
- Vivian Flowers (born c. 1969), state representative from Pine Bluff
- Clay Ford (1938–2013), member of both the Arkansas and Florida House of Representatives
- Vince Foster (1945–1993), presidential aide
- Woody Freeman (born 1946), businessman and 1984 Republican gubernatorial nominee
- J. William Fulbright (1905–1995), U.S. senator
- Augustus H. Garland (1832–1899), U.S. attorney general
- Jeremy Gillam (born 1976), Republican state representative from Lonoke County
- John W. Grabiel (1867–1928), Republican gubernatorial nominee in 1922 and 1924
- Michael John Gray (born 1976), Democratic member of the Arkansas House for Independence, Jackson, White, and Woodruff counties since 2015
- Michelle Gray (born 1976), Republican member of the Arkansas House of Representative for Independence, Izard, Sharp, and Stone counties since 2015
- Kenny Guinn (1936–2010), governor of Nevada 1999–2007; Arkansas native

H–K

- Kim Hammer (born 1958), Republican member of the Arkansas House of Representatives from Saline County; Baptist clergyman in Benton
- John Paul Hammerschmidt (1922–2015), former U.S. representative of Arkansas's 3rd congressional district; congressional sponsor of the Buffalo National River
- Josh Hawley (born 1979), U.S. senator from Missouri since 2019
- Fonda F. Hawthorne (born 1956), Democratic former member of the Arkansas House of Representatives for Little River County
- John Heiskell (1872–1972), U.S. senator and newspaper publisher
- Kenneth Henderson (born c. 1963), member of the Arkansas House of Representatives for Pope County; real estate developer in Russellville
- Jim Hendren (born 1963), member of the Arkansas State Senate from Benton County since 2013; former member of the Arkansas House of Representatives
- Kim Hendren (born 1938), former member of the Arkansas State Senate and the Arkansas House of Representatives from Benton County
- Ben C. Henley (1907–1987), Arkansas state Republican chairman 1955–1962, lawyer and businessman in Harrison
- J. Smith Henley (1917–1997), federal judge in Fayetteville, retired to senior status in Harrison; brother of Ben Henley
- Bart Hester (born 1977), Arkansas state senator from Benton County
- Jimmy Hickey Jr. (born 1966), Arkansas state senator from Texarkana
- Grant Hodges (born 1990), Arkansas state representative for Benton County since 2015
- Jim L. Holt (born 1965), Republican politician
- Mike Huckabee (born 1955), governor 1996–2007
- Asa Hutchinson (born 1950), former U.S. representative
- Donna Hutchinson (born 1949), member of the Arkansas House of Representatives from Benton County
- Jeremy Hutchinson (born 1974), Arkansas state senator
- Tim Hutchinson (born 1949), former U.S. representative and former U.S. senator
- Timothy Chad Hutchinson (born 1974), former member of the Arkansas House of Representatives from Benton County
- Lane Jean (born 1958), Arkansas state representative from Columbia, Lafayette, and Miller counties; former mayor of Magnolia
- Bob Johnson (born 1953), Democratic member of the Arkansas House of Representatives for Pulaski County since 2013; former justice of the peace
- James D. Johnson (1924–2010), Arkansas Supreme Court justice, segregationist leader
- Robert W. Johnson (1814–1879), U.S. and Confederate States senator
- J. B. Judkins, Arkansas state senator, elected president of the state's senate in 1883
- Allen Kerr (born 1956), former member of the Arkansas House of Representatives for Pulaski County

L–M

- Jack Ladyman (born 1947), mechanical engineer and Republican member of the Arkansas House of Representatives for Craighead County since 2015
- Benjamin Travis Laney (1896–1977), governor
- Andrea Lea (born 1957), Arkansas state auditor 2015–2023; Republican former member of the Arkansas House of Representatives for Pope County
- Tim Lemons (born c. 1962), Republican member of the Arkansas House of Representatives for District 43 in Lonoke County
- Kelley Linck (born 1963), Republican member of the Arkansas House of Representatives for Marion County
- Blanche Lincoln (born 1960), former U.S. senator and former U.S. representative
- Marilyn Lloyd (1929–2018), former U.S. representative from Tennessee
- A. Lynn Lowe (1936–2010), former Arkansas Republican state chairman and unsuccessful nominee for U.S. House of Representatives (1966) and governor (1978)
- Mark Lowery (1957–2023), member of the Arkansas House of Representatives from Pulaski County since 2013
- Robin Lundstrum (born c. 1962), Republican member of the Arkansas House of Representatives for Benton and Washington counties since 2015
- Mark R. Martin (born 1968), secretary of state of Arkansas
- John L. McClellan (1896–1977), chairman, Senate Appropriations Committee
- Mark McElroy (born 1956), Democratic member of the Arkansas House of Representative for Desha, Chicot and Ashley counties since 2013
- Sid McMath (1912–2003), former Arkansas governor, trial lawyer, and Marine Corps general
- Stephen Meeks (born 1970), Republican member of the Arkansas House of Representatives from Faulkner County; brother of David Meeks
- Gary Miller (born 1948), U.S. representative from California
- Joshua D. "Josh" Miller (born 1981), member of the Arkansas House of Representatives from Heber Springs
- Wilbur Daigh Mills (1909–1992), chairman of United States House Ways and Means Committee
- Isaac Murphy (1799–1882), governor of Arkansas

N–R

- Micah Neal (born 1974), Republican member of the Arkansas House of Representatives from Springdale
- Milton Nicks (born 1950), state representative for Crittenden and Cross counties since 2015; Baptist pastor in Earle, resident of Marion, Arkansas
- George E. Nowotny (born 1932), state representative from Sebastian County 1967–1972
- Isaac Parker (1838–1896), "Hanging Judge" of Fort Smith
- Danny L. Patrick (1941–2009), Republican state representative from Madison and Carroll counties 1967–1970
- Rebecca Petty (born c. 1970), Republican member of the Arkansas House of Representatives for Benton County; advocate of child crime victims, resident of Rogers
- Mathew Pitsch (born 1963), Republican member of the Arkansas House of Representatives from Fort Smith since 2015
- Carolyn Pollan (1937–2021), state representative from Sebastian County 1975–1999
- David Pryor (1934–2024), U.S. senator, governor, U.S. representative; founding dean of the Clinton School of Public Service
- Mark Pryor (born 1963), U.S. senator; son of David Pryor
- Donald A. Quarles, deputy secretary of defense and communications engineer
- Jim Ranchino (1936–1978), political scientist, consultant, and pollster
- Terry Rice (born 1954), Republican member of the Arkansas Senate, former member of the Arkansas House of Representatives; businessman and rancher in Waldron
- Jacqueline Roberts (born 1944), former state legislator
- Joseph T. Robinson (1872–1937), senate majority leader and vice presidential candidate
- Tommy F. Robinson (1942–2024), sheriff, U.S. representative
- Winthrop Rockefeller (1912–1973), governor of Arkansas
- Winthrop Paul Rockefeller (1948–2006), lieutenant governor
- Mike Ross (born 1961), U.S. representative 2001–2013; unsuccessful Democratic gubernatorial nominee in 2014
- Laurie Rushing (born 1968), member of the Arkansas House of Representatives for Garland and Hot Spring counties since 2015; real estate broker in Hot Springs
- J. T. Rutherford (1921–2006), U.S. representative from Texas
- Leslie Rutledge (born 1976), lieutenant governor of Arkansas

S–Z

- William H. "Bill" Sample (born 1946), member of both houses of the Arkansas General Assembly from Hot Springs since 2005
- David J. Sanders (born 1975), Arkansas state senator from Pulaski County; former member of the Arkansas House of Representatives
- Sarah Huckabee Sanders (born 1982), White House press secretary
- Max Sandlin (born 1952), U.S. representative from Texas
- William S. Sessions (1930–2020), FBI director
- Ambrose H. Sevier (1801–1848), U.S. senator, "father of Arkansas statehood"
- Lottie Shackelford (born 1941), Democratic National Committee vice chair
- Jim Sheets (1931–2020), state representative 1967–1968; first Republican to represent Benton County in legislature in the 20th century
- Mary Lou Slinkard (born 1943), state representative from Benton County since 2009
- Brandt Smith (born 1959), state representative since 2015 for Craighead County; former Southern Baptist missionary
- John W. Snyder (1895–1985), U.S. treasury secretary
- Vic Snyder (born 1947), U.S. representative 1997–2011
- William L. Spicer (1918–1991), chairman of the Arkansas Republican Party 1962–1964; intraparty rival of Winthrop Rockefeller
- Greg Standridge (1967–2017), Arkansas state senator for Newton, Pope, Boone, Carroll, and Van Buren counties since 2015; insurance agent in Russellville
- Gary Stubblefield (born 1951), Arkansas state senator from Franklin County
- James Sturch (born 1990), Republican member of the Arkansas House of Representatives for Independence County since 2015
- Dan A. Sullivan (born 1950), Arkansas state representative for Craighead and Greene counties since 2015
- Dwight Tosh (born 1948), state representative since 2015 from Jonesboro; retired state police officer
- Wallace Townsend (1882–1979), attorney and Republican politician
- Tommy Tuberville (born 1954), former football coach; U.S. senator from Alabama since 2021
- DeAnn Vaught (born 1970), farmer and member of the Arkansas House of Representatives for Sevier County
- Dave Wallace (born 1948), member of the Arkansas House of Representatives from Mississippi and Poinsett counties since 2015; decorated Vietnam War veteran
- Wes Watkins (born 1938), U.S. representative from Oklahoma
- Bruce Westerman (born 1967), majority leader of the Arkansas House
- Frank Durward White (1933–2003), governor 1981–1983
- Eddie Joe Williams (born 1954), state senator and former mayor
- James Lee Witt (born 1944), former FEMA director
- Judy Petty Wolf (born 1943), former state representative
- Richard Womack (born 1974), state representative from Arkadelphia
- Shawn Womack (born 1972), judge of the Arkansas 14th Judicial District; Republican former member of both houses of the Arkansas legislature from Baxter County
- Jon Woods (born 1977), state senator
- James Word (born c. 1953), Democratic former member of the Arkansas House of Representatives for Jefferson and Lincoln counties
- Marshall Wright (born 1976), Democratic member of the Arkansas House of Representatives for Monroe, St. Francis, Woodruff, and Lee counties since 2011

== Scientists and physicians ==
- Moses T. Clegg (1876–1918), bacteriologist noted for his work in leprosy
- Joycelyn Elders (born 1933), former surgeon general of the United States
- Mary L. Good (1931–2019), former chair and first female member of the American Chemical Society board
- Samuel L. Kountz (1930–1981), pioneer in organ transplant surgery
- William L. McMillan (1936–1984), National Academy of Sciences physicist noted for his research on superconductors
- Trent Pierce, family practitioner; chairman of the Arkansas Medical Board
- Taylor Wilson (born 1994), nuclear physics prodigy; youngest person to achieve fusion, at the age of 14
- Gazi Yaşargil (1925–2025), named "Neurosurgery's Man of the Century" by the Congress of Neurological Surgeons

== Social figures ==
- Daisy Bates (1914–1999), civil rights leader and activist
- Melba Pattillo Beals (born 1941), civil rights activist and member of the Little Rock Nine
- Minnijean Brown-Trickey (born 1941), civil rights activist and member of the Little Rock Nine
- Eldridge Cleaver (1935–1998), activist
- Elizabeth Eckford (born 1941), civil rights activist and member of the Little Rock Nine
- Ernest Green (born 1941), civil rights activist and member of the Little Rock Nine
- Robert L. Hill (1892–1963), Black leader during the Elaine massacre
- Scipio Africanus Jones (1863–1943), attorney
- Gloria Ray Karlmark (born 1942), civil rights activist and member of the Little Rock Nine
- Carlotta Walls LaNier (born 1942), civil rights activist and member of the Little Rock Nine
- Terrence Roberts (born 1941), civil rights activist and member of the Little Rock Nine
- Adolphine Fletcher Terry (1882–1976), social activist
- Louise Thaden (1905–1979), aviation pioneer
- Jefferson Thomas (1942–2010), civil rights activist and member of the Little Rock Nine
- Cephas Washburn (1793–1860), Indian missionary

== Sportspeople ==
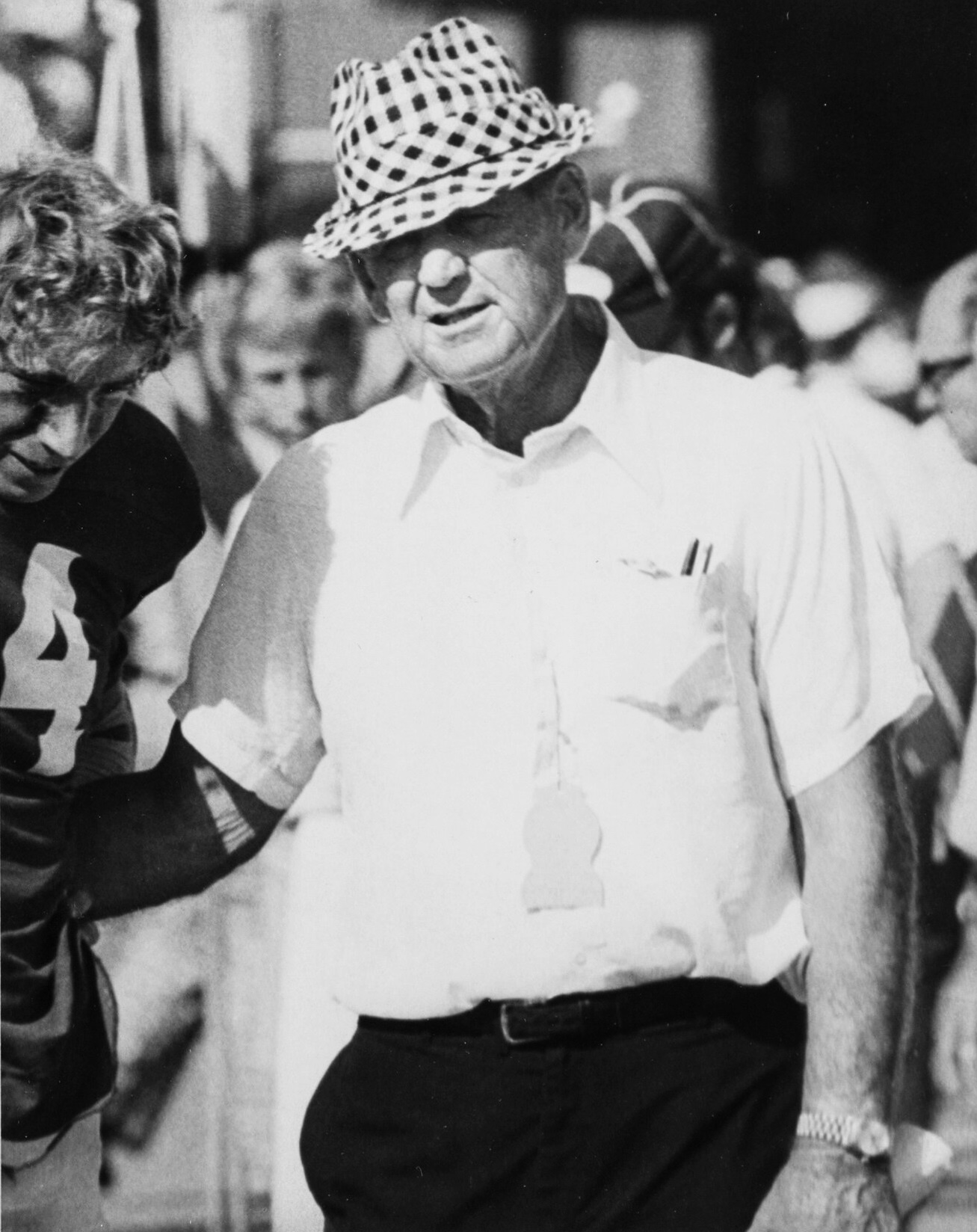
Bear Bryant

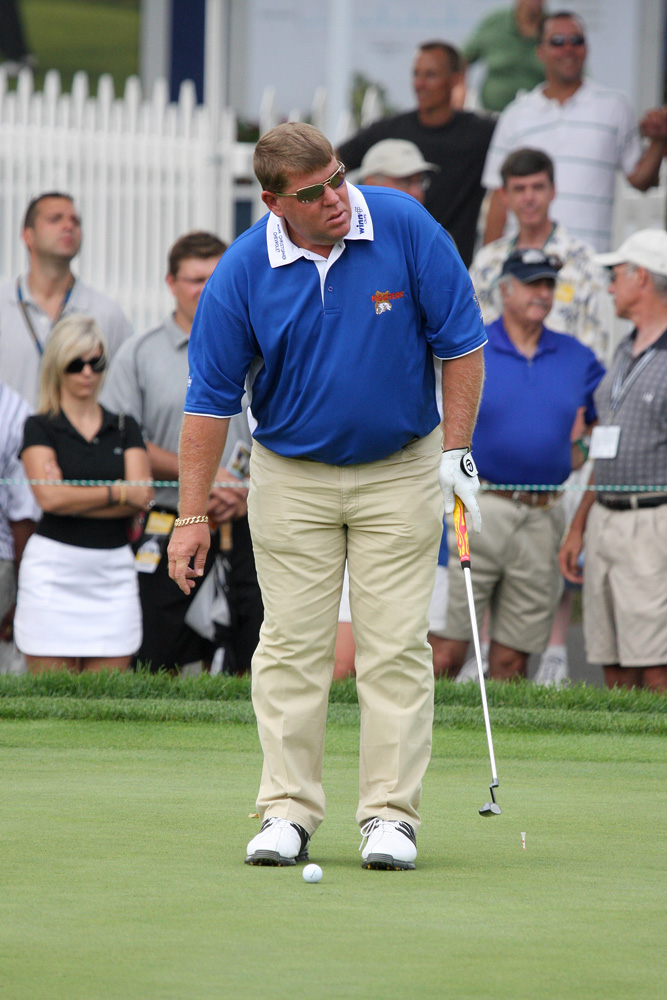
John Daly

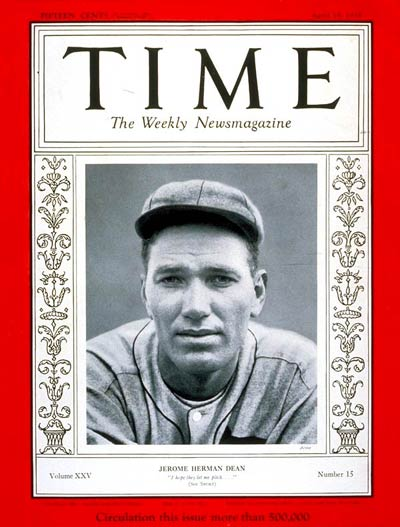
Dizzy Dean

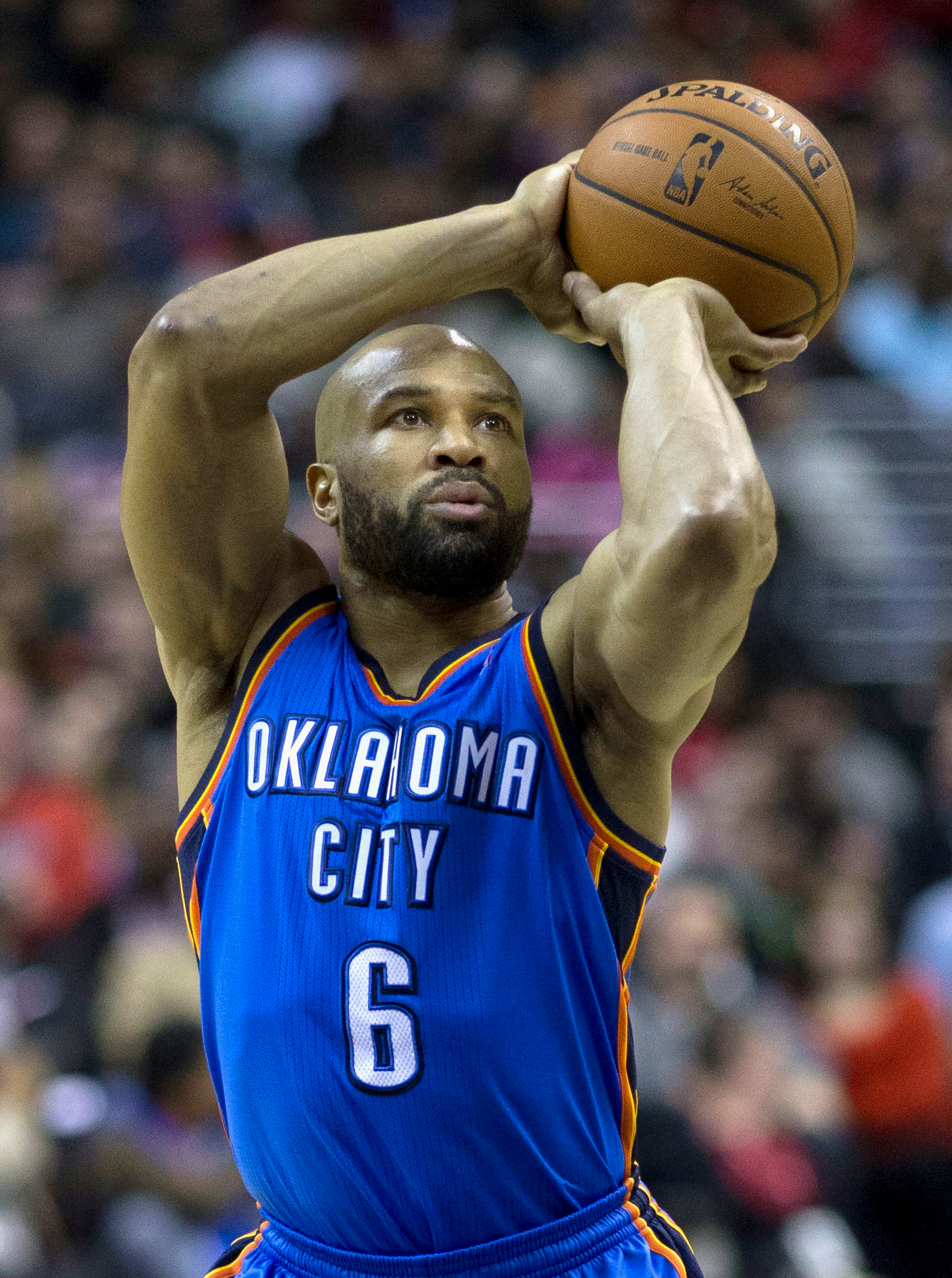
Derek Fisher

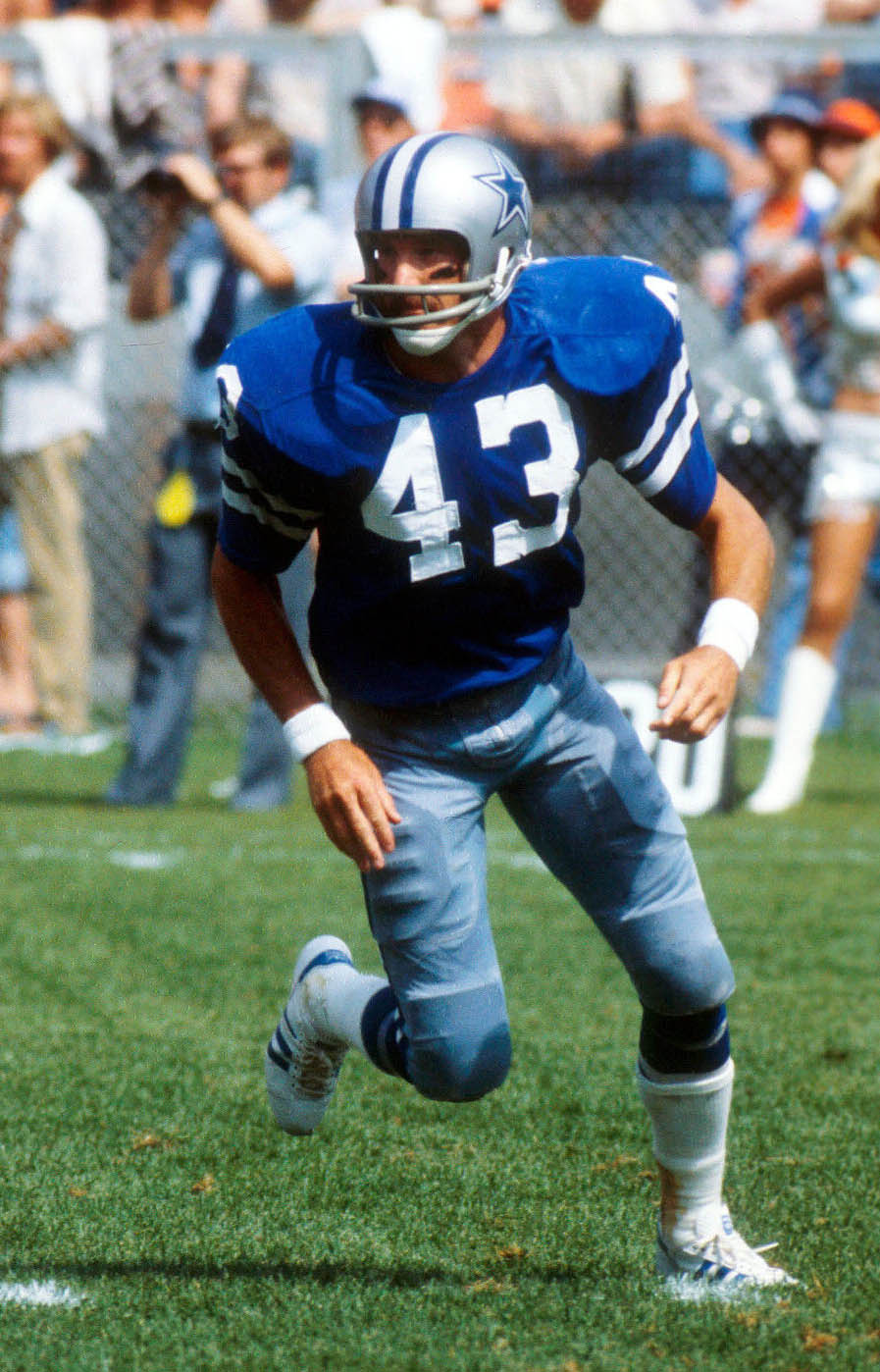
Cliff Harris

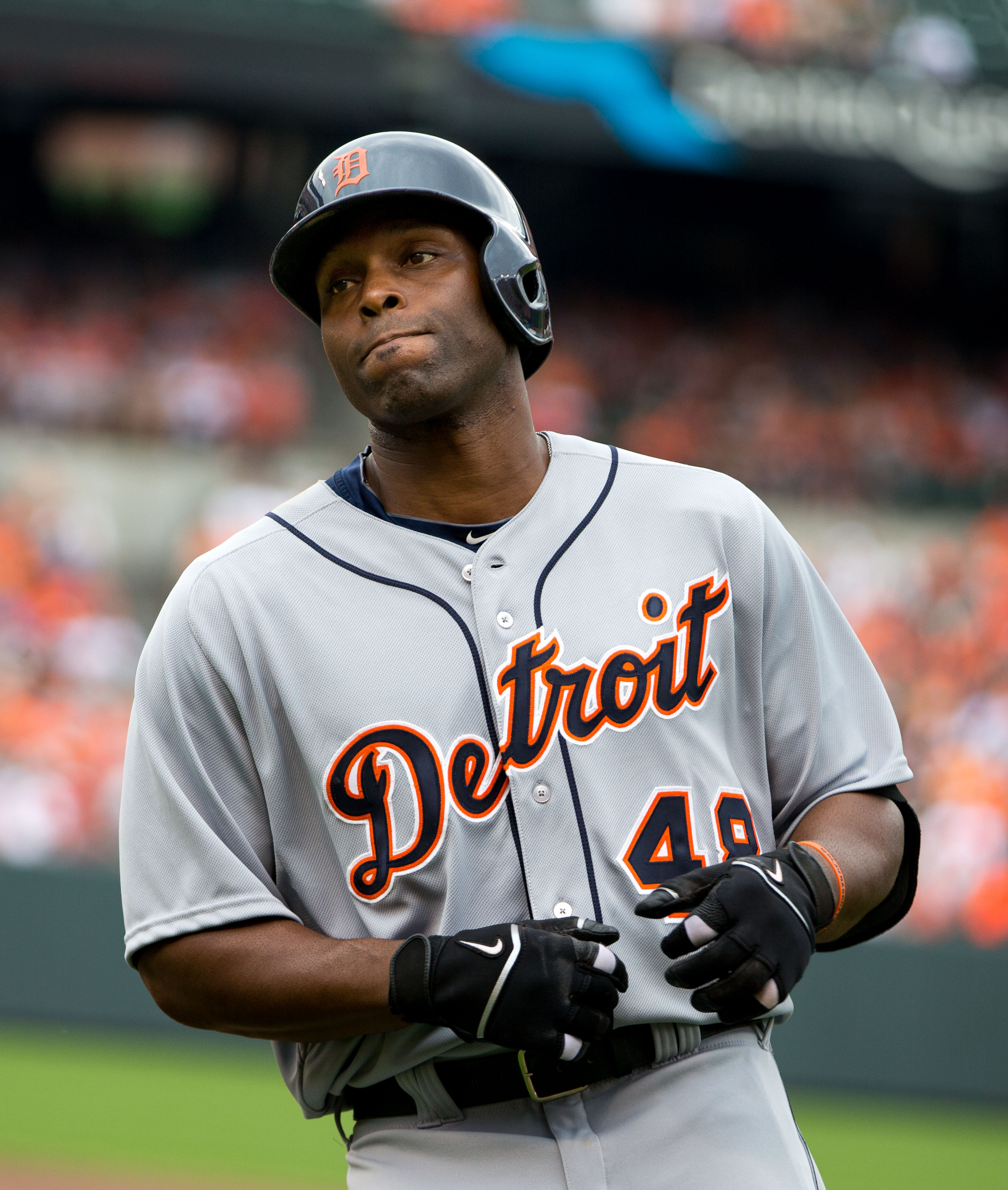
Torii Hunter

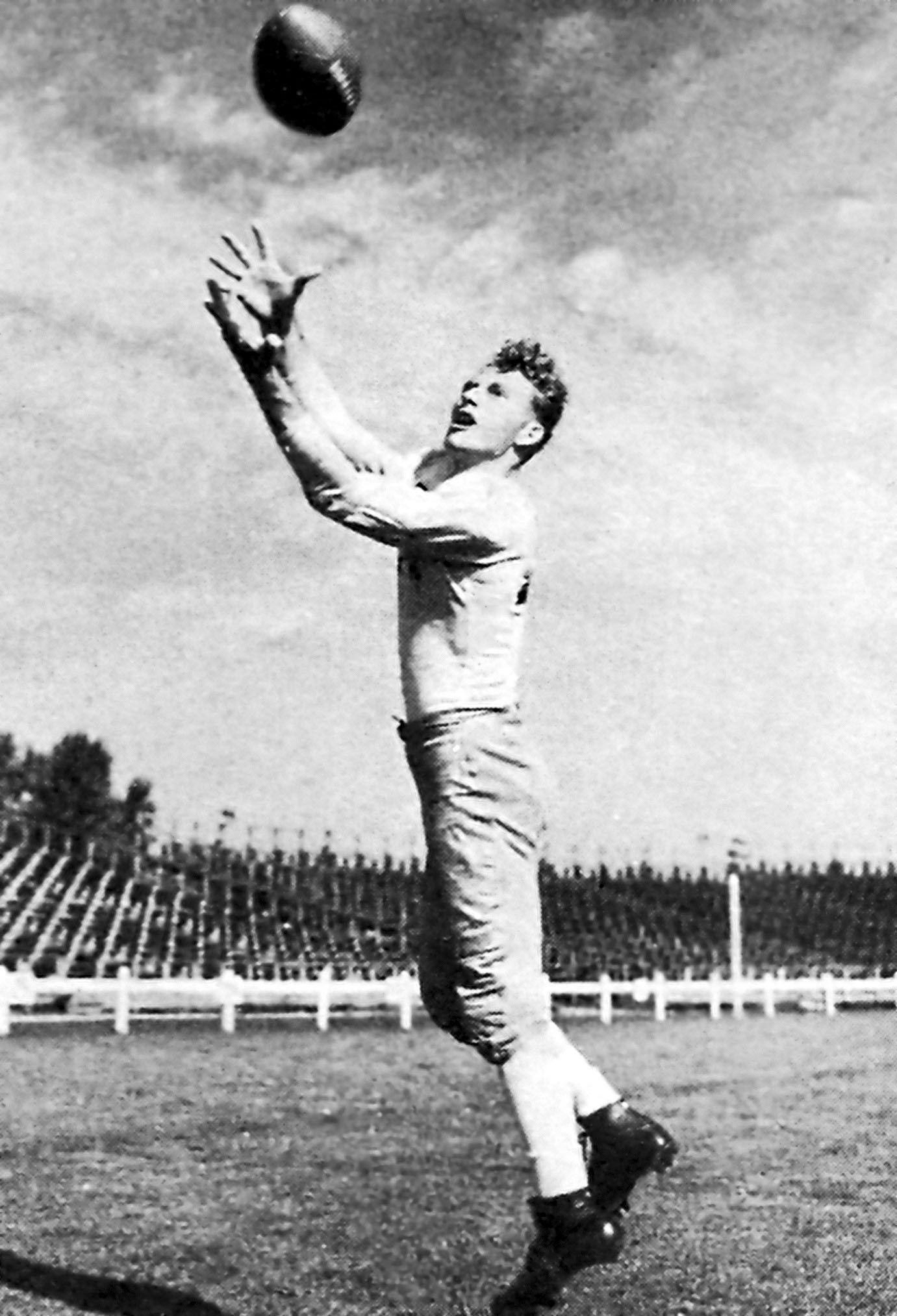
Don Hutson

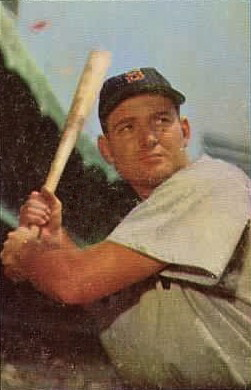
George Kell

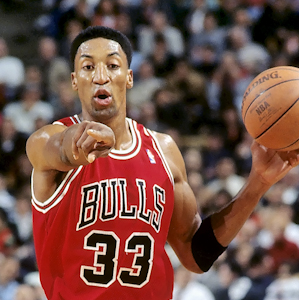
Scottie Pippen

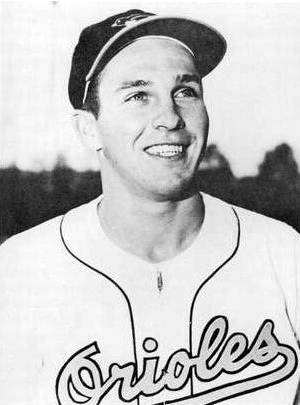
Brooks Robinson

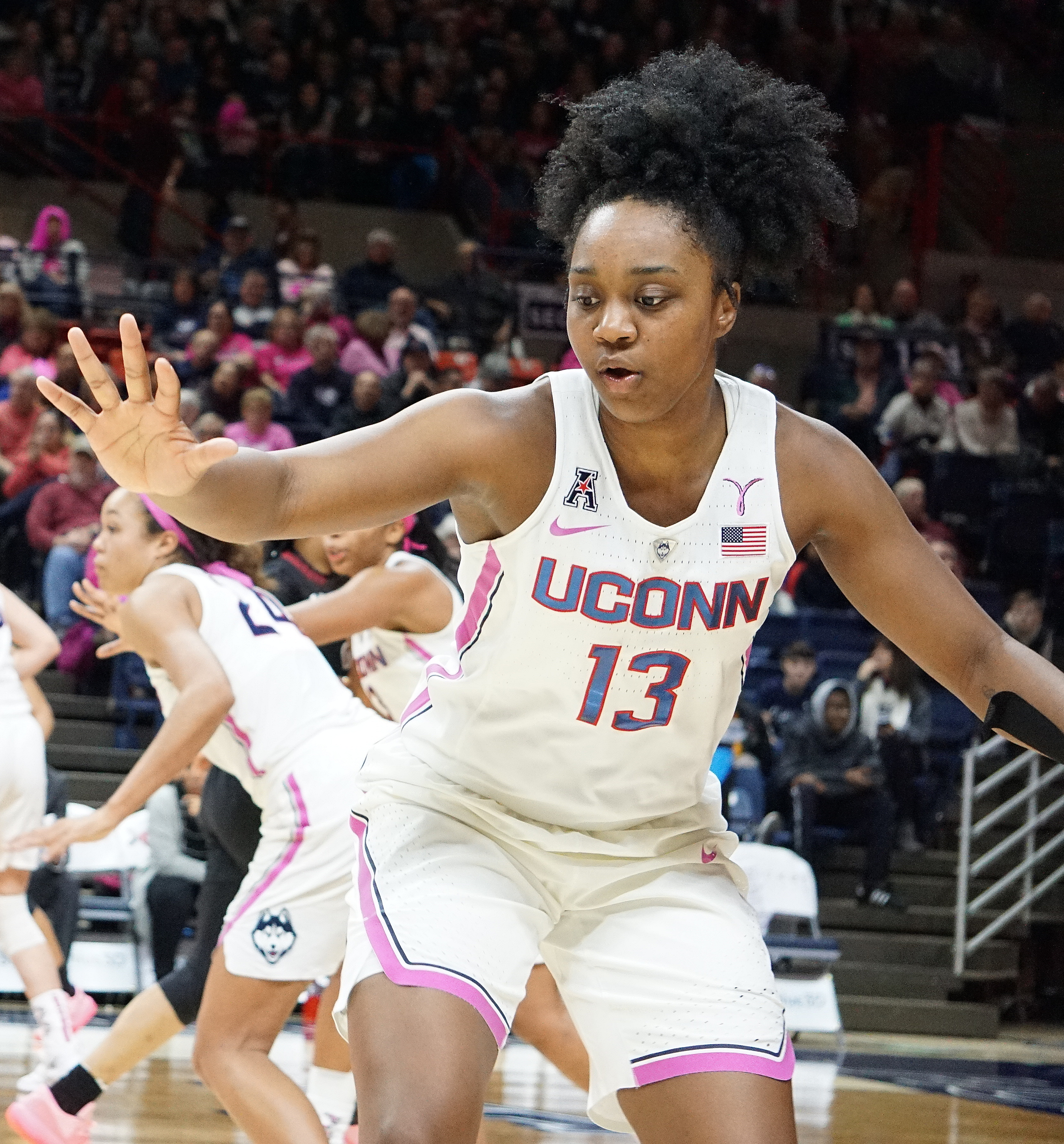
Christyn Williams

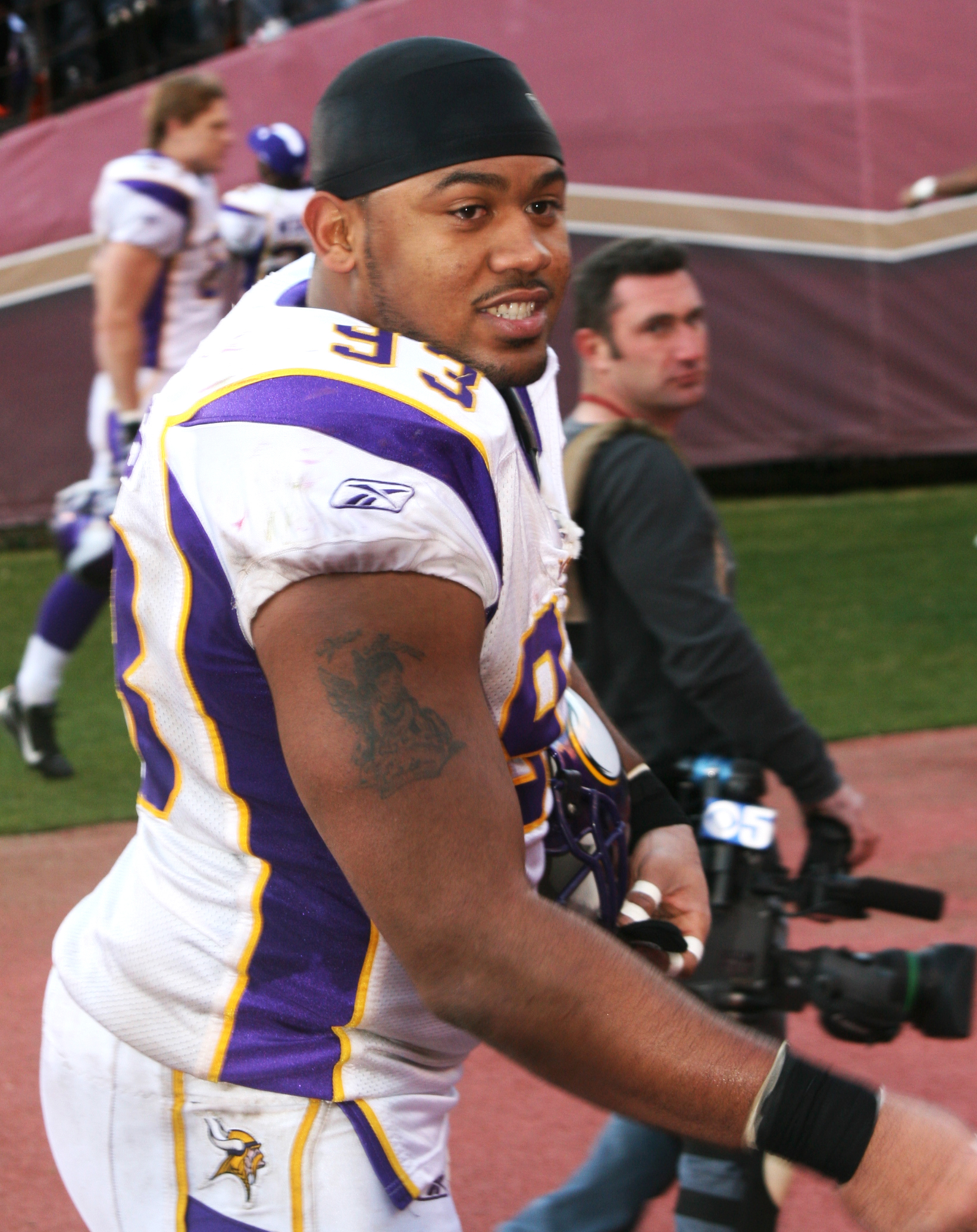
Kevin Williams

- James Anderson (born 1989), professional basketball player
- Shawn Andrews (born 1982), professional football player
- Stacy Andrews (born 1981), professional football player
- Herbert Eugene "Geese" Ausbie (born 1938), professional basketball player with Harlem Globetrotters
- Kris Bankston (born 1999), basketball player in the Israeli Basketball Premier League
- Gene Bearden (1920–2004), professional baseball player
- Alan Belcher (born 1984), professional MMA fighter
- Earl Bell (born 1955), Olympic pole vaulter
- Mike Brisiel (born 1983), professional football player
- Lou Brock (1939–2020), professional baseball player, Hall of Famer
- Ray Brown (born 1962), professional football player, Arkansas State University alumnus
- T.J. Brown (born 1990), professional mixed martial arts fighter
- Paul "Bear" Bryant (1913–2016), football coach
- Brandon Burlsworth (1976–1999), college football player
- A. J. Burnett (born 1977), professional baseball player
- Pat Burrell (born 1976), professional baseball player
- Bill Carr (1909–1966), Olympic runner and 2-time gold medalist
- Maurice Carthon (born 1961), professional football player
- Shameka Christon (born 1982), professional basketball player
- Charles Clay (born 1989), professional football player
- Nathaniel Clifton (1922–1990), professional Hall of Fame basketball player
- Mike Conley Jr. (born 1987), professional basketball player
- John Daly (born 1966), professional golfer
- Tank Daniels (born 1981), professional football player
- Willie Davis (1940–2010), professional baseball player
- Dizzy Dean (1910–1974), professional baseball player, Hall of Famer
- Bill Dickey (1907–1993), professional baseball player, Hall of Famer
- Sid Eudy (born 1960), professional wrestler
- Jeremy Evans (born 1987), professional basketball player
- Derek Fisher (born 1974), professional basketball player
- Wes Gardner (1961–2026), professional baseball player
- Craig Gentry (born 1983), professional baseball player
- Brett Goode (born 1984), professional football player
- Charles Greene (1944–2022), Olympic sprinter
- Ed Hamm (1906–1982), Olympic long-jump gold medalist
- Dan Hampton (born 1957), professional football player, NFL Hall of Fame member
- Dusty Hannahs (born 1993), basketball player in the Israeli Basketball Premier League
- Chris Harris (born 1982), professional football player
- Cliff Harris (born 1948), professional football player, member of the Pro Football Hall of Fame
- Demetrius Harris (born 1991), professional football player
- Dutch Harrison (1910–1982), professional golfer
- Marcus Harrison (born 1984), professional football player
- Red Hickey (1917–2006), professional football player and coach
- Peyton Hillis (born 1986), professional football player
- Jim Hines (1946–2023), track and field athlete
- Zach Hocker (born 1991), professional football player
- Cedric Houston (born 1982), professional football player
- Torii Hunter (born 1975), professional baseball player
- Don Hutson (1913–1997), professional football player, NFL Hall of Fame member
- Travis Jackson (1903–1987), professional baseball player, Hall of Fame member
- Joe Johnson (born 1981), professional basketball player
- Wes Johnson, professional baseball coach
- Matt Jones (born 1983), professional football player
- Al Joyner (born 1960), track and field Olympian
- Jakob Junis (born 1992), baseball pitcher for the San Francisco Giants
- Ken Kavanaugh (1916–2007), professional football player and coach
- George Kell (1922–2009), professional baseball player, Hall of Famer
- Don Kessinger (born 1942), professional baseball player and manager
- Greg Lasker (born 1964), professional football player
- Cliff Lee (born 1978), professional baseball pitcher
- Sonny Liston (1932–1970), professional boxer, World Heavyweight Champion
- Sherm Lollar (1924–1977), professional baseball player
- Daryl Macon (born 1995), basketball player for Maccabi Tel Aviv of the Israeli Basketball Premier League
- Ryan Mallett (born 1988), professional football player
- Mark Martin (born 1959), championship NASCAR driver
- Darren McFadden (born 1987), professional football player
- Kevin McReynolds (born 1959), professional baseball player
- Bobby Mitchell (1935–2020), professional football player, Hall of Famer
- Bryce Mitchell (born 1994), professional mixed martial arts fighter
- Sidney Moncrief (born 1957), professional basketball player
- Rick Monday (born 1945), professional baseball player, sportscaster
- Malik Monk (born 1998), professional basketball player
- Tommy Morrison (1969–2013), professional boxer, two-time heavyweight champion
- Dustin Moseley (born 1981), professional baseball player
- Bo Nix (born 2000), professional football player
- Larry Nixon (born 1950), professional sport fisherman
- Houston Nutt (born 1957), collegiate football coach; quarterback; basketball player
- Frank Okam (born 1985), professional football player
- Blake Parker (born 1985), professional baseball player
- Jermey Parnell (born 1986), professional football player
- Joe Perry (1927–2011), professional football player
- Mitch Petrus (1987–2019), professional football player
- Scottie Pippen (born 1965), professional basketball player, Hall of Famer
- Elijah Pitts (1938–1998), professional football player and coach
- Bobby Portis (born 1995), professional basketball player
- Anthony Randolph (born 1989), professional basketball player
- Austin Reaves (born 1998), professional basketball player
- Willie Roaf (born 1970), professional football player, Hall of Famer
- Brooks Robinson (1937–2023), professional baseball player, Hall of Famer
- Preacher Roe (1916–2008), professional baseball player
- Keena Rothhammer (born 1957), Olympic swimmer
- Johnny Sain (1917–2006), professional baseball player
- Elbert Shelley (born 1964), professional football player
- Rod Smith (born 1970), professional football player
- Drew Smyly (born 1989), professional baseball player
- Drew Sutton (born 1983), professional baseball player
- Barry Switzer (born 1937), football coach
- Jermain Taylor (born 1978), professional boxer
- Cedric Thornton (born 1988), professional football player
- Charley Thornton (1937–2004), sports figure
- Arky Vaughan (1912–1952), professional baseball player, Hall of Famer
- Harry Vines (1938–2006), wheelchair basketball coach
- Lon Warneke (1909–1976), professional baseball player
- Sonny Weems (born 1986), professional basketball player
- Christyn Williams (born 2000), professional basketball player
- Corey Williams (born 1980), professional football player
- Damian Williams (born 1988), professional football player
- DeAngelo Williams (born 1983), professional football player
- Kevin Williams (born 1980), professional football player
- Corliss Williamson (born 1973), professional basketball player
- Payton Willis (born 1998), basketball player in the Israeli Basketball Premier League
- Travis Wood (born 1987), professional baseball player

== Other Arkansans ==
- Larry P. Arnn, president of Hillsdale College since 2000
- Matt Besser (born 1967), comedian
- James Black (1800–1872), manufacturer of the Bowie knife
- Ben M. Bogard (1868–1951), clergyman
- George W. Bond (1891–1974), educator and college president
- Boogie2988 (born 1974), internet personality
- Richard O. "Dick" Covey (born 1946), astronaut
- Jesse Dirkhising (1986–1999), crime victim
- Bill Doolin (1858–1896), outlaw and founder of the Wild Bunch, born in Johnson County
- Mack Ray Edwards (1918–1971), child sex abuser/serial killer; committed suicide by hanging in his prison cell
- Minnie Rutherford Fuller (1868–1946), farmer, broker, temperance leader, suffragist
- Edwin R. Gilliland (1909–1973), chemical engineer
- Elizabeth Ward Gracen (born 1961), Miss America, actress
- Jack Graham (born 1950), pastor of Prestonwood Baptist Church in Plano, Texas
- Connie Hamzy (1955–2021), prolific rock groupie noted as "Sweet, Sweet Connie" in the Grand Funk Railroad 1973 song "We're An American Band"
- Bill Hicks (1961–1994), comedian
- T. J. Holmes (born 1977), CNN weekday anchor
- Rex Humbard (1919–2007), televangelist
- D. N. Jackson (1895–1968), clergyman
- Kenneth Johnson (born 1942), writer, director and producer
- Paula Jones (born 1966), sued President Bill Clinton for sexual harassment
- Nan Keohane (born 1940), president of Duke University
- Ralphie May (1972–2017), comedian
- Martha Beall Mitchell (1918–1976), wife of John N. Mitchell
- Jeff Nichols (born 1978), screenwriter and director
- Freeman Owens (1890–1979), pioneer in cinematography
- Scott E. Parazynski (born 1961), astronaut
- Theodore Rinaldo (1944–2000), charismatic religious leader, businessman, and convicted child sex offender
- John Selman (1839–1896), outlaw
- Savvy Shields (born 1995), Miss America 2017
- Trevor Rainbolt (born 1998) viral YouTuber famous for his GeoGuessr skills
- Amarillo Slim (1928–2012), professional poker player
- Steve Stephens, radio and television host
- Heath Stocks, convicted murderer who killed his family in Lonoke
- Debbye Turner (born 1967), Miss America 1990, television host and news anchor
- Terri Utley (born 1962), Miss USA 1982
- John Joshua Webb (1847–1882), gunslinger
- Roger L. Worsley (born 1937), educator

== See also ==
- List of Arkansas suffragists
- Lists of Americans
