= Moses T. Clegg =

American bacteriologist (1876–1918)

- Born: Moses Tran Clegg; September 1, 1876; Red Bluff, Arkansas, U.S.
- Died: August 9, 1918 (aged 41); Honolulu, Hawaii, U.S.
- Education: University of Arkansas
- Spouse: Edna Wisner (m. 1911)
- Children: 3
- Scientific career
- Fields: Bacteriology
- Workplaces: Philippine Bureau of Science; Queen's Hospital, Honolulu
- Military service
- Branch: United States Volunteers; United States Army
- Service years: 1898; 1899–1902
- Rank: Corporal; Acting Hospital Steward
- Units: Company A, 1st Arkansas Infantry; Hospital Corps
- Wars: Spanish–American War; Philippine Insurrection

Moses Tran Clegg (September 1, 1876 – August 9, 1918) was an American bacteriologist noted for his work in Leprosy. He is best known as the first scientist to segregate and propagate the leprosy bacillus.

== Early life ==
Clegg was born on September 1, 1876, at Red Bluff, Arkansas, and educated at the University of Arkansas. After a period of service in Company A, 1st Arkansas Infantry during the Spanish–American War, he enlisted in the Hospital Corps, serving through the Philippine Insurrection.

== Career ==
Clegg was assistant bacteriologist in the Philippine Bureau of Science at Manila from 1902 to 1910, assistant director of the Leprosy Investigation Station in Hawaii from 1910 to 1915, and bacteriologist at San Francisco from 1916 to 1917. At the time of his death, he was superintendent of Queen's Hospital, Honolulu.

== See also ==
- List of people from Arkansas
- List of University of Arkansas people
