= Red Bluff, Arkansas =

Former village in Arkansas, United States

- Location within Arkansas
- 34°28′52.3″N 92°9′0.5″W
- Location: Jefferson County, Arkansas

History
- Founded: September 2, 1869 (156 years ago)

Red Bluff is a former village in Jefferson County, Arkansas, United States. The area it once occupied is located in the northeast part of Barraque Township.

== History ==
Founded on September 2, 1869, Red Bluff served as a landing for steamboats on the Arkansas. In 1880, it had a total population of 74. All that remains of the settlement is an abandoned cemetery.

== Notable people ==
- Moses T. Clegg (1876–1918), a bacteriologist noted for his work in leprosy
