= J. B. Hunt =

American trucking and transportation company

J.B. Hunt Transport Services, Inc.

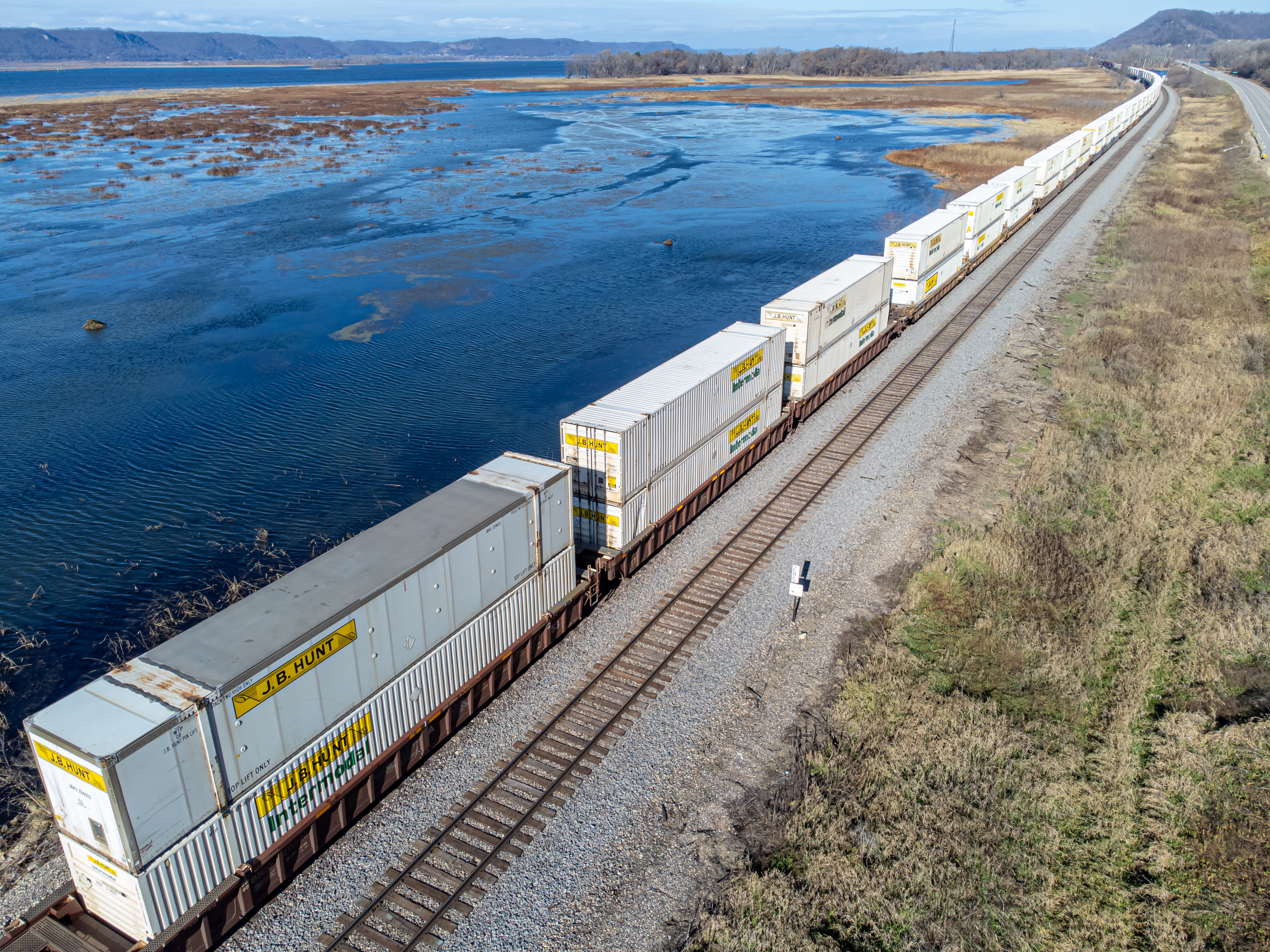
- J.B. Hunt intermodal on BNSF Railway
- Type: Public
- Traded as: Nasdaq: JBHT; DJTA component; S&P 500 component
- Founded: August 10, 1961; 65 years ago
- Founders: Johnelle Hunt; Johnnie Bryan Hunt
- Headquarters: Lowell, Arkansas, U.S.
- Key people: John N. Roberts, III (chairman of the board); Shelley Simpson (President) and (CEO); John Kuhlow (CFO)
- Revenue: ▼US$12.830 billion (2023)
- Operating income: ▼US$993 million (2023)
- Net income: ▼US$728 million (2023)
- Total assets: ▲US$8.538 billion (2023)
- Total equity: ▲US$4.103 billion (2023)
- Number of employees: 34,718 (2023)
- Website: JBHunt.com

J.B. Hunt Transport Services, Inc. is an American transportation and logistics company based in Lowell, Arkansas. It was founded by Johnnie Bryan Hunt and Johnelle Hunt in Arkansas on August 10, 1961. By 1983, J.B. Hunt had grown into the 80th largest trucking firm in the US, with $623.47 million in revenue. At that time J.B. Hunt operated 550 tractors, 1,049 trailers, and had roughly 1,050 employees. J.B. Hunt primarily operates semi-trailer trucks and provides transportation services throughout the continental US, Canada and Mexico. The company's fleet consists of over 12,000 trucks and 145,000 trailers and containers.

== History ==
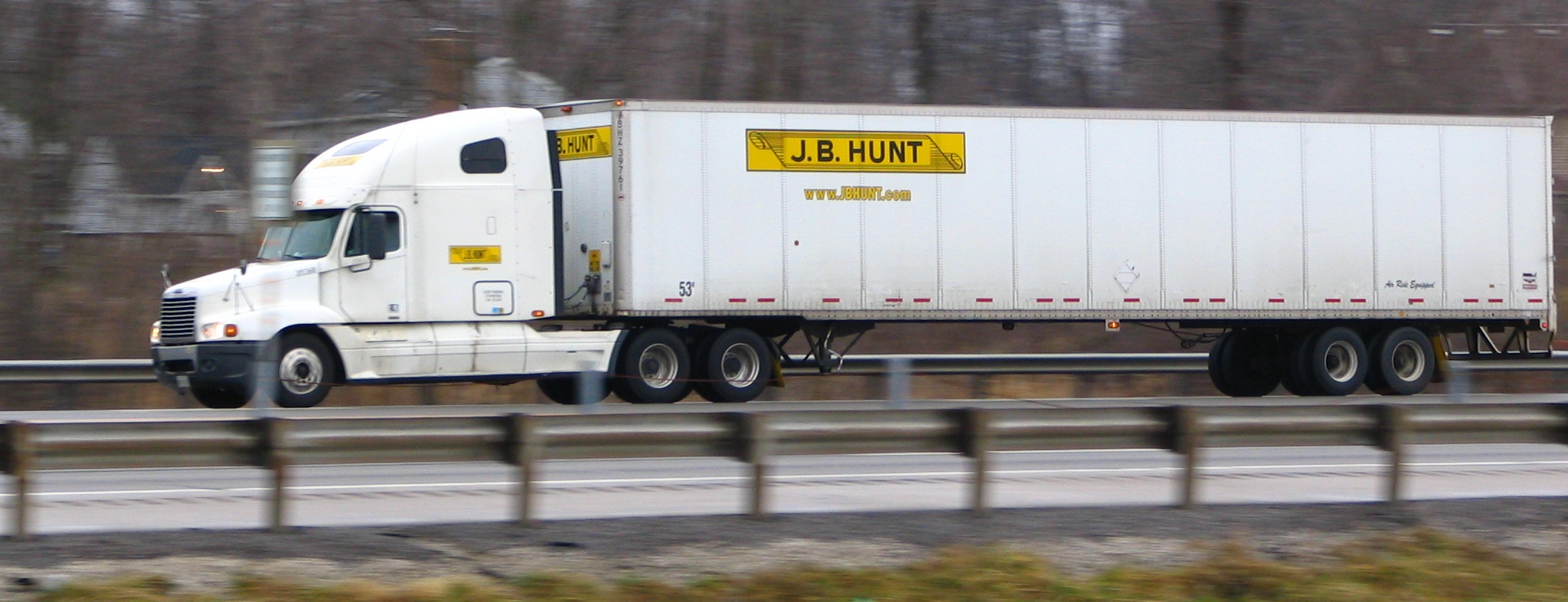
A J.B. Hunt truck on the Ohio Turnpike in 2006

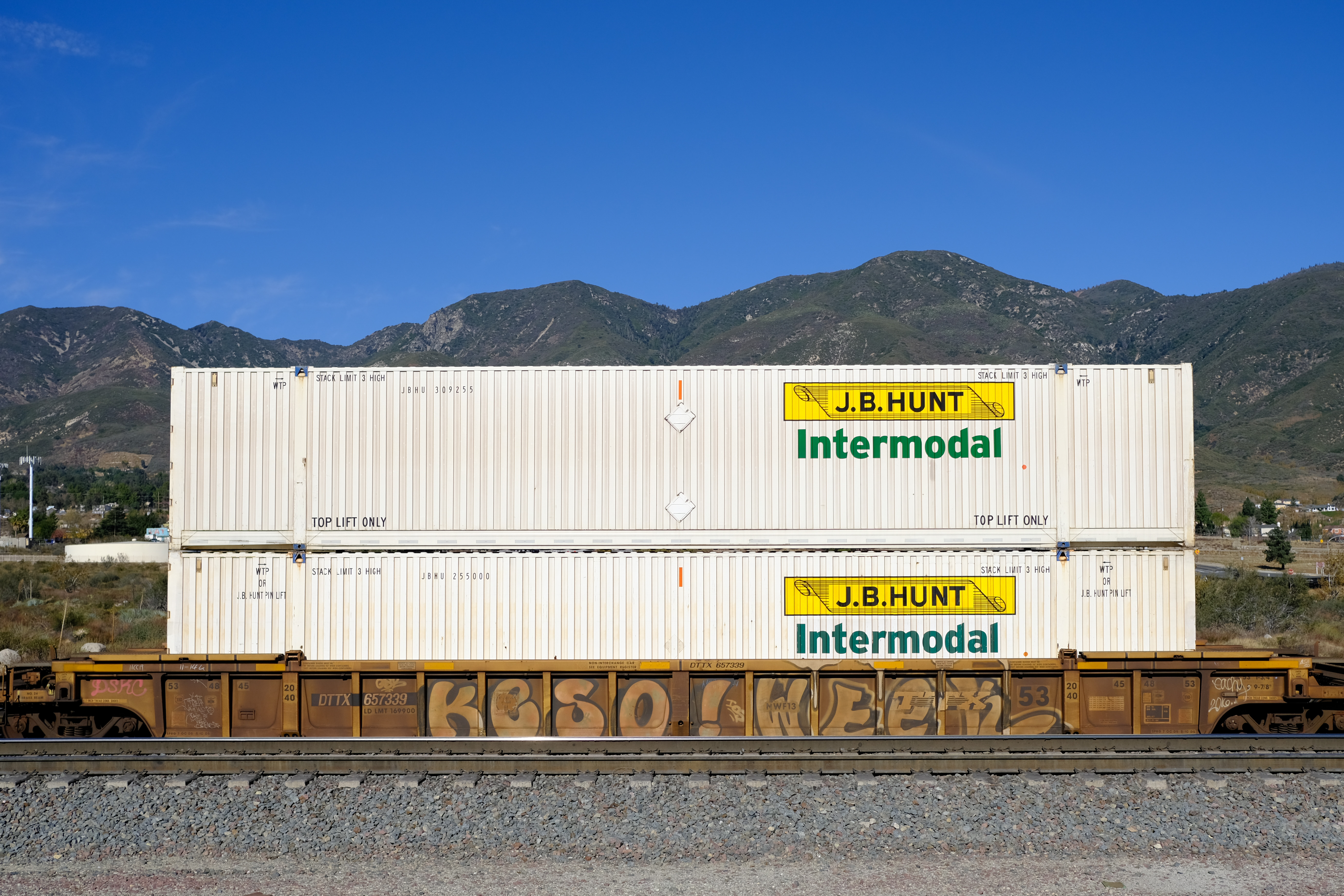
J.B. Hunt intermodal containers being transported by rail in 2020

The company was founded in 1961. By 1983, J.B. Hunt became a publicly held company and has grown into the 4th largest trucking firm in the U.S.

In 1989, J.B. Hunt Transport began partnering with railroads to offer intermodal service. The initial partnership was with the Atchison, Topeka and Santa Fe Railway later part of the BNSF Railway, and has since grown to other Class I railroads including Norfolk Southern, CSX, CN, and KCS. The company's operations are distributed in four business segments (intermodal transport, contract services, logistics and truckload shipping), providing delivery services in the continental United States, Canada, and Mexico. About two-thirds of the company's revenues and profits come from intermodal.

The company introduced a dedicated service in 1993.

On February 7, 2017, J. B. Hunt became a NASDAQ-100 company.

On February 22, 2024, J.B. Hunt entered into a multi-year agreement with Wal-Mart Stores Inc. As part of this deal J.B. Hunt acquired all of Wal-Mart's intermodal trailing equipment. This acquisition of roughly 15,500 trailers brings J.B. Hunt's total Intermodal trailing equipment count up to 118,171 intermodal boxes.

In 2024, J.B. Hunt purchased 20 hydrogen trucks from Nikola Corporation.

In 2025, J.B. Hunt, with BNSF Railway and Mexican company GMXT, launched a service called Quantum de Mexico for rail intermodal freight deliveries between the U.S. and Mexico.

== Corporate responsibility ==
=== Sustainability ===
J.B. Hunt has reserved several Tesla electric trucks and added all-electric box trucks to its fleet.

In early 2025, J.B. Hunt was admitted into the Dow Jones Sustainability North America index (for 2024), making it the only road transportation company in the index at the time.
