= Johnelle Hunt =

American billionaire (born 1932)

- Born: Johnelle Terria DeBusk; January 4, 1932 (age 94); Heber Springs, Arkansas, US
- Education: University of Central Arkansas (dropped out)
- Spouse: Johnnie Bryan Hunt (m. 1952; his death 2006)
- Children: 2

Johnelle Terria Hunt (née DeBusk, born January 4, 1932) is an American billionaire, the widow of Johnnie Bryan Hunt, and co-founder of J.B. Hunt Transport Services, the company they started in 1961.

== Early life ==
Hunt was born Johnelle Terria DeBusk on January 4, 1932, in Heber Springs, Arkansas. She dropped out of the University of Central Arkansas.

== Career ==
Hunt was on the board of J.B. Hunt Transport Services, the largest publicly owned trucking company in the US, until 2007, the year after her husband, J.B. Hunt, died. She continues to be the largest individual shareholder in the company.

In November 2023, Hunt had a net worth of US$4.6 billion.

== Personal life ==
Hunt has two children and lives in Fayetteville, Arkansas. Her son Bryan Hunt is on the board of J.B. Hunt Transport Services. However, Bryan has not been employed with the company itself since 1997 and instead serves as the Managing Member of the company's private Progressive Car Finance automobile financing company.
