= Trent Pierce =

American physician

Trent P. Pierce, a family practitioner in West Memphis, Arkansas, is currently chairman of the Arkansas Medical Board.

Pierce was critically injured when a bomb exploded in his hybrid Lexus SUV on the morning of Wednesday, 4 February 2009. The 54-year-old Pierce was badly injured, with burns on 18 percent of his body, two broken bones, the loss of his left eye and damage to the right.

Pierce was well known in his West Memphis community, but police at first had no leads in the bombing. However, Pierce was a co-defendant in a wrongful death suit against the Arkansas Supreme Court up until a few weeks prior to the bombing.

On August 7, Pierce made his first appearance at the Arkansas Medical Board since the bombing. On August 10, police announced that Dr. Randeep Mann, who had been arrested in March on unrelated weapons charges, was the "prime suspect" in the bombing. He had previously been disciplined by the Arkansas Medical Board for overprescribing pain medication.

On January 6, 2010, a superseding indictment, with ten total charges, was issued against Mann and his wife. Mann was charged alone in six counts; one pertained to use of a weapon of mass destruction, one to malicious use of an explosive on a vehicle, three to unregistered grenades and firearms, one to unlawful possession of a machine gun, and one to possession of contraband, specifically chloroform, while in federal custody. He and his wife were charged jointly with two counts of obstruction or impedance of justice, and Sue Mann was charged with making a false declaration to a federal grand jury.

Mann was convicted on August 9, 2010, of conspiracy to carry out the bombing. His wife Sangeeta Mann was convicted of conspiring to conceal the evidence.
