= Johnnie Bryan Hunt =

American trucking entrepreneur (1927–2006)

- Hunt in 2004
- Born: Johnnie Bryan Hunt, Sr; February 28, 1927; Heber Springs, Arkansas, U.S.
- Died: December 7, 2006 (aged 79); Springdale, Arkansas, U.S
- Occupations: Founder and C.E.O. of J. B. Hunt Transport Services. (1961–2004)
- Spouse: Johnelle Hunt (m. 1952; his death 2006)

Johnnie Bryan Hunt, Sr. (J. B. Hunt; February 28, 1927 – December 7, 2006) was an American entrepreneur who founded J. B. Hunt Transport Services, the largest publicly owned trucking company based in Lowell, Arkansas.

== Early life and career ==
Hunt was born in Cleburne County near Heber Springs, Arkansas. His first job was working for his uncle at a sawmill. After a stint in the US Army, Hunt spent the 1950s as a lumber salesman, auctioneer, and truck driver. He married Johnelle DeBusk in 1952, and they had a daughter, Jane, in 1954, and a son, Bryan, in 1960.

Hunt started a rice hulls business with his wife Johnelle in 1961. After initially losing $19,000, the business became the world's largest producer of poultry litter. In 1969, Hunt purchased a small trucking operation with five tractors and seven trailers, at first as a support for the rice hulls business. By 1983, the operation had grown into the 80th largest trucking firm in the U.S. The same year, Hunt sold his rice hull operation, and J. B. Hunt Transport Services, Inc., went public, offering more than one million shares of stock.

== Retirement ==
Hunt stepped down as president of his company in 1982 but remained a fixture, staying on as chairman of the board until 1995. On December 31, 2004, Hunt retired but remained the company's largest shareholder.

Hunt was generous. He carried a money clip containing $100 bills, which he would hand out to people he felt were needy.

In 2005, Springdale Public Schools opened a new elementary school named after Hunt. The Hunt family donated the land for the school, valued in excess of $500,000. This K-5 elementary school is located on Silent Grove Road in Springdale, Arkansas. Hunt was a frequent visitor to the school after it opened.

In early 2006, Hunt bought the site of the abandoned Superconducting Super Collider in Waxahachie, Texas, for $6.5 million, hoping to turn it into a secure data storage facility. His death at a hospital in Springdale, Arkansas, on December 7, 2006, after sustaining a head injury in a fall on ice five days earlier, put an end to this project.

== Awards and honors ==
- 1993: Golden Plate Award of the American Academy of Achievement
- 2001: Arkansas Business Hall of Fame
- 2016: Council of Supply Chain Management Professionals’ (CSCMP) Hall of Fame
