= Heath Stocks =

American murderer

Heath Stocks is an American criminal who confessed to killing his father Joe, yet never directly admitting to the murder of mother Barbara, and sister Heather in the family home located in Lonoke, Arkansas on January 17, 1997.

== History of abuse ==
Heath Stocks is a long-time victim of sexual and psychological abuse by his former Scoutmaster Charles "Jack" Walls III. For years prior to the murders of his family, Heath had a strained relationship with his father, mainly due to the interference of Walls, who exploited the difficulties in Heath and his father's relationship. Jack used the trust his parents had in him to create deep misunderstanding between the father and son. However, Heath would later say that his mother, sister, and grandparents were always supportive of him, even if they could not understand what was causing his anger and sadness. The abuse was confirmed nine days before the murders when Heath's mother witnessed her son being assaulted in his bedroom. This was not reported to police, mainly due to the threat of Walls's influence and his power to silence the community; Heath's mother Barbara was fearful of the situation. She did, however, confide what she had seen to her own mother, Annie May Harris and to her pastor, Reverend Robert Marble, who, by profession, was a mandatory reporter but told no one. Mrs. Harris did not communicate the information given to her by her daughter. She was informed there was a gag order evoked regarding the investigation into the murders and did not realize, and no one clarified, that the gag order did not render her information moot. Reverend Marble simply withheld the information not only during the investigation but would become a "hostile witness" during the investigation into Jack Walls a few months later. When Heath's mother and sister confronted Heath regarding what had been witnessed, he confessed to them that he had been sexually abused by Walls for years.

== The murders ==
After revealing Jack's abuse to his mother and sister, Heath made what he calls "one of the greatest mistakes of my life" when he told Walls that the secret was out. Heath states that Walls became furious with him and instructed him to "kill the problem." This would not come into play during Heath's sentencing, but it would come to light a mere four months after Heath's sentence, when Walls's own nephew, Wade Knox, forced Walls to confess to Wade's parents, at gunpoint, to the repeated rapes of himself, his brother, and many other Boy Scouts, including Heath.

The night of the murders, the Stocks residence was ransacked and several articles of value were taken. He claimed that at the time his family arrived home, he was thinking of committing suicide with a .45 caliber handgun he had found in the house, and that he had the barrel of the gun in his mouth when they arrived. His sister returned home first, followed in less than five minutes by his mother and father.

After the murders of his parents and sister, Stocks fled the residence, driving to Arkadelphia and throwing items taken from the house out of the vehicle on his way, including the .45 caliber handgun. He was captured the next morning around 6:00 a.m. at the apartment of a friend, where he was asleep, following a statewide alert calling for his capture. Lonoke County investigators arrived, took custody of Stocks, and transported him back to Lonoke, where he was charged with three counts of capital murder.

=== Investigation and trial ===
Investigator Steve Finch took the lead on the investigation. Heath was interviewed numerous times in an attempt to understand how and why the murders occurred. According to one of these interviews, Heath admitted to murdering his mother, father, and sister, only after being pressured and manipulated to protect the secret of the man abusing him, who has been speculated to have been present during the murders. Pressured by his family, Stocks ultimately took the blame and pleaded guilty to all three murders. He received three consecutive life sentences.

An intensive investigation into the activities of former scout master Jack Walls followed shortly thereafter. Walls, once voted Lonoke's Chamber of Commerce "Man of the Year" for his work with the boy scouts, was eventually convicted of six counts of rape, and sentenced to three life sentences. Walls, however, pleaded no contest to the rape of Heath Stocks. It is widely speculated that this action spared Walls of an investigation into his participation and association with the Stocks's murders. Chief Charles Peckat, an investigator of the Walls sexual abuse accusations wrote a letter to Judge Hanshaw wherein he discusses the many issues his investigation was met with, most done by the prosecuting attorney, Larry Cook. Since Walls's conviction, there have been numerous calls for a pardon or parole made on behalf of Heath Stocks. Judge Hanshaw's dissertation at the close of Jack's trial gives an insight to this accusation.

It is widely speculated that Heath did not act alone, nor did he murder all three members of his family and, had anyone taken the appropriate actions in the investigation, a guilty plea would not have been submitted. One such supporter who suggested Heath not getting a fair trial was Betty Dickey, (Arkansas' first female Supreme Court Justice), the special prosecutor appointed to the State v. Charles A. "Jack" Walls, III matter, which was remanded on appeal for re-sentencing. Read his letter to Judge Hanshaw, dated December 30, 1998. (additional correspondence can be found at www.heathstocks.info.)

=== Recent legal status ===
On September 20, 2017, Heath filed a motion, pro se, with the trial court, requesting their reinvestment into this 1997 case which resulted in a conviction. The motion has been sealed by the Court to protect the names of victims and for the medical records, it contains. Heath has also requested counsel be appointed to aid him in this post-conviction remedy.

=== Legacy ===
Wade's actions eventually resulted in Walls's arrest and conviction. Wade committed suicide after years of struggling with the sexual and psychological abuse inflicted upon him. His parents have opened an organization in his name, "The Wade Knox Child Advocacy Center", in Lonoke, Arkansas in the hopes that children such as Heath and Wade can find a safe haven and receive the support they need.
