= Hope Hendren Duke =

American politician

Member of the Arkansas House of Representatives from the 12th district
- Incumbent
- Assumed office January 9, 2023

Personal details
- Party: Republican
- Parent: Kim Hendren (father)
- Relatives: Gayla Hendren McKenzie (sister); Jim Hendren (brother); Asa Hutchinson (uncle); Tim Hutchinson (uncle); Jeremy Young Hutchinson (cousin); Timothy Chad Hutchinson (cousin)
- Education: University of Arkansas

Hope Hendren Duke is an American politician. She serves as a Republican member for the 12th district of the Arkansas House of Representatives.

== Life and career ==
Duke attended the University of Arkansas.

Duke served in the Gravette School Board for six years.

In May 2022, Duke defeated Jason Maxwell in the Republican primary election for the 12th district of the Arkansas House of Representatives, along with Jay Oliphant. In June 2022, she defeated Oliphant in the Republican primary runoff election.

In November 2022, Duke defeated Michael Gill in the general election, winning 76 percent of the votes. She assumed office in 2023. Duke's district is located in Northwest Arkansas, and covers Bella Vista, Gravette, Decatur, Maysville, Sulphur Springs, Decatur.
