= Kim Hendren =

American engineer and politician

Member of the Arkansas House of Representatives
- In office January 15, 2015 – January 14, 2019
- Preceded by: Mary Lou Slinkard
- Succeeded by: Gayla Hendren McKenzie
- Constituency: 92nd district
- In office January 8, 2001 – January 13, 2003
- Preceded by: Jim Hendren
- Succeeded by: David Haak
- Constituency: 1st district

Member of the Arkansas Senate
- In office January 13, 2003 – January 14, 2013
- Preceded by: Brenda Gullett
- Succeeded by: Bruce Holland
- Constituency: 9th district
- In office January 8, 1979 – January 10, 1983
- Preceded by: Jim Caldwell
- Constituency: 6th district

Minority Leader of the Arkansas Senate
- In office 2000s–2010s
- Preceded by: Denny Altes
- Succeeded by: John Burris

Personal details
- Born: Kim Dexter Hendren; February 8, 1938 (age 88) Gravette, Arkansas, U.S.
- Party: Democratic (until c. 1995); Republican (since c. 1995)
- Spouse: Marylea Hutchinson Hendren
- Children: 4, including Gayla, Hope, and Jim Hendren
- Relatives: Tim Hutchinson (brother-in-law); Asa Hutchinson (brother-in-law); Donna Hutchinson (sister-in-law); Jeremy Hutchinson (nephew); Timothy Chad Hutchinson (nephew)
- Education: University of Arkansas (BS)
- Occupation: Engineer; politician

Kim Dexter Hendren (born February 6, 1938) is an American engineer and politician. He served as a Democratic and Republican member for the 6th and 9th districts of the Arkansas Senate. Hendren also served a member of the Arkansas House of Representatives for the 1st and 92nd districts.

Hendren was born in Gravette, Arkansas, and attended Gravette High School. He then attended at the University of Arkansas, where he earned a Bachelor of Science degree in industrial engineering in 1960. Hendren worked as an engineer. He established and owned the company Hendren Plastics Inc. He was also a colonel in the Arkansas Air National Guard.

In 1979 Hendren was elected for the 6th district of the Arkansas Senate, serving until 1983. In 2001, he was elected for the 1st district of the Arkansas House of Representatives, succeeding his son Jim. He was then a Republican politician.

In 2003, Hendren was elected for the 9th district of the Arkansas Senate, where he served until 2013. In 2015, he was elected for the 92nd district of the Arkansas House of Representatives. In 2019, he was succeeded by his daughter Gayla.

In his career, Hendren had served as the minority leader of the Arkansas Senate.
