= Lloyd Andrews =

Lloyd Andrews may refer to:

- Lloyd Andrews (ice hockey), Canadian ice hockey player
- Lloyd Andrews (actor), American actor, singer and composer
- Lloyd J. Andrews, American politician and businessman

== See also ==
- Lloyd Andrews Hamilton, World War I flying ace
