= Jeremy Hutchinson =

Jeremy Hutchinson may refer to:

- Jeremy Hutchinson, Baron Hutchinson of Lullington (1915–2017), British life peer
- Jeremy Hutchinson (politician) (born 1974), United States politician
