= John Burris (disambiguation) =

John Burris (born 1945) is an American civil rights attorney. John Burris may also refer to:

- John Burris (Arkansas politician) (born 1986), American politician from Arkansas
- John M. Burris (born 1946), American politician from Delaware
