= Old Spanish Treasure Cave =

Cave in United States of America

Coordinates: 36°28′56″N 94°27′37″W

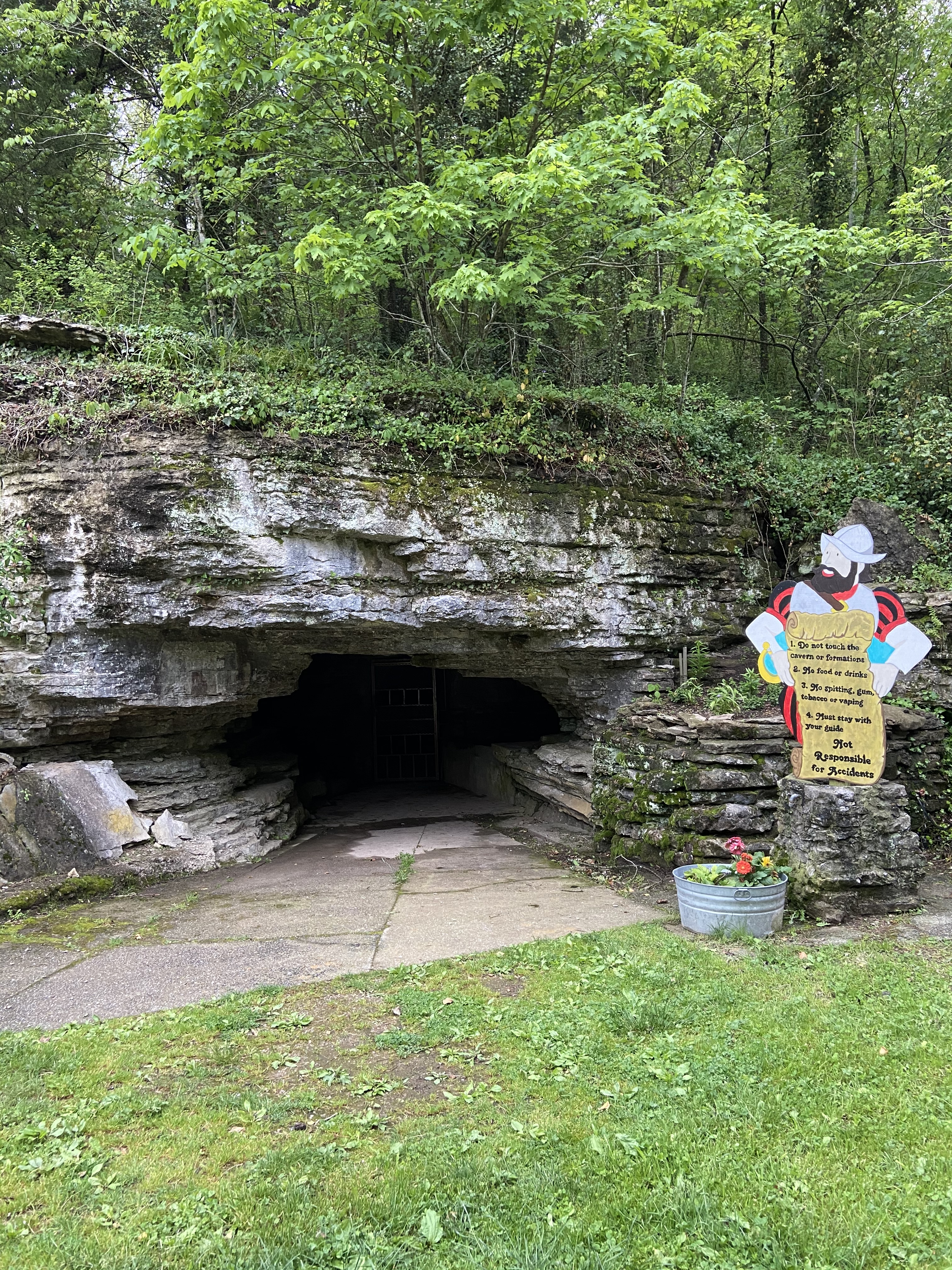
Entrance to the cave

The Old Spanish Treasure Cave is located on Hwy 59 between Sulphur Springs and Gravette, Arkansas in the northwest corner of the state. It has been a popular tourist attraction since at least 1908. It is still open to the public, with guided tours and other activities such as panning for treasure and finding fossils.

== Cave formation ==
The cave formation is known as a karst cave. This formation is still a topic of geological research. Basically, it is formed from water containing carbon dioxide (CO_{2}) dissolving limestone.

The Old Spanish Treasure Cave is unlike most tour caves. It is what is called a maze cavern. There are passageways all throughout the cavern leading into different rooms and even more tunnels.

== Legend ==
Many of the caves in Arkansas and the Ozark region have legends and fables about hidden gold and silver, often attributed to Hernando de Soto's vicious search for gold. Their origins go back as far as the early 1700s, when the French explored the area, and some might have come from even earlier Spanish legends.

=== Legend details, 1908 ===
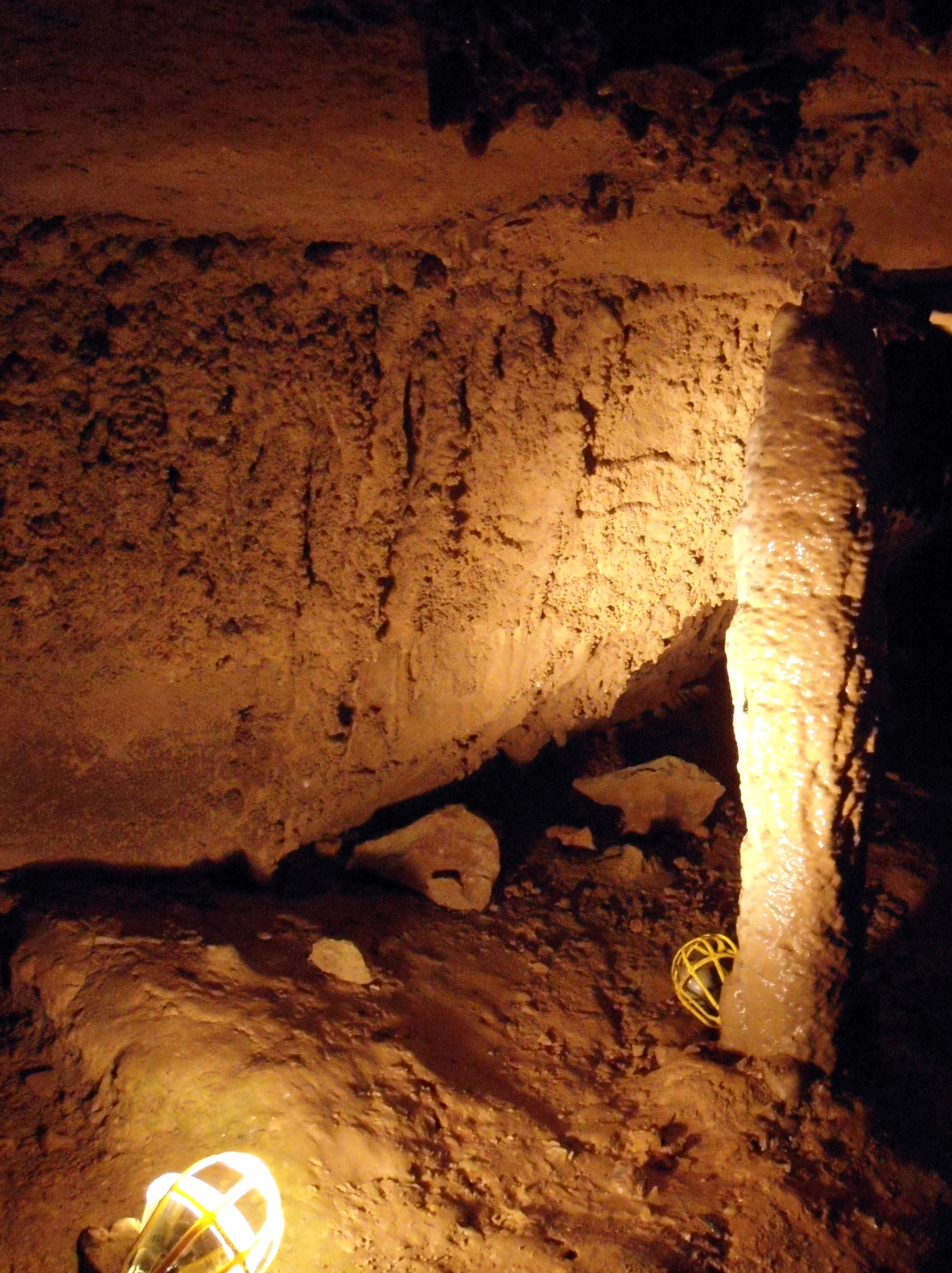
Cave interior

In the early 1700s, Don Carlos Lavilla was one of the Spaniards looking for El Dorado, the lost city of gold. He was in the Ozarks, prospecting near Sulphur Springs for gold and silver because the area has lead and zinc outcroppings, which sometimes means other valuable metals are nearby.

Lavilla saw the tracks of a black bear, and he followed the tracks to the mouth of the cave. He fought the bear, drew a map of the cave's tunnels on sheepskin with directions for finding the cave again, and returned to Spain.

Many years later, his heirs returned to the cave and worked a vein of ore. They smelted the ore and hid bullion worth $3 million (about $102 million in 2024) in the cave instead of taking it back to Spain.

In 1900, another of Lavilla's descendants returned, with the map, to take the hidden bullion. He discovered that some citizens of Benton county were digging around, looking for the bullion for themselves. Lavilla's map of the cave was found to be accurate, but the bullion had been moved.

=== Legend details, 1931 ===
This cave used to be called the Black Cave, named after the black bear mentioned in the 1908 legend details.

De Soto's followers were looking for gold in the Ozarks when they came across the Black Cave next to a creek in the Touch-me-not Hollow (valley). They mined the cave and carved a map of the mine into the trunk of an old oak tree that was nearby.

In 1900, a Spaniard came to the area pretending to know secrets about the cave. He convinced capitalists in Kansas City to excavate the cave, and they spent months and thousands of dollars excavating as far as a mile into the mountain. They discovered that the map left on the old oak tree was accurate, but did not find the gold.

=== Legend details, 1970 ===
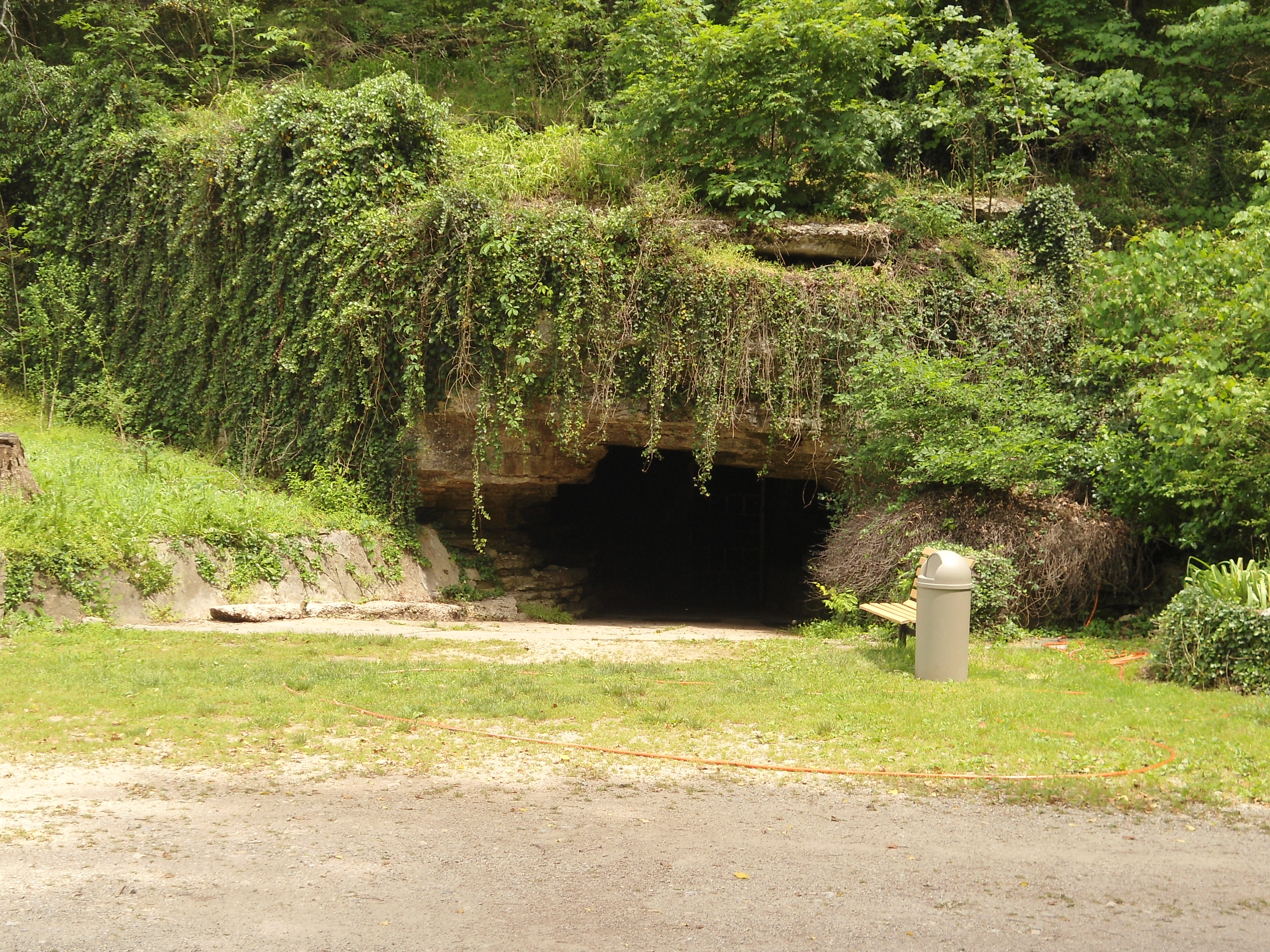
Cave entrance

In about 1720, bandits robbed churches in Mexico of their gold statues, bars of gold bullion, and gold coins. Looking to hide with their loot, they made their way to the Ozark region of Arkansas. A blizzard forced them to find shelter in the cave, and they hid the gold in the back of the cave. Native Americans discovered that the outlaws were camping in the cave, and killed them in a battle. However, they didn't find the gold and its location remains a secret.

In about 1900, George Dunbar and an unnamed Spaniard came to Arkansas. The Spaniard had maps showing the location of the cave and its hidden treasure. Dunbar and other workers explored the cavern and installed a railway to remove dirt as they dug, and although Dunbar searched until he died they didn't find the gold.

Later W.W. Knight hired another crew of workers and also dug in the cave, in search of the gold, finally giving up in 1918.

=== Legend details, 2018 ===
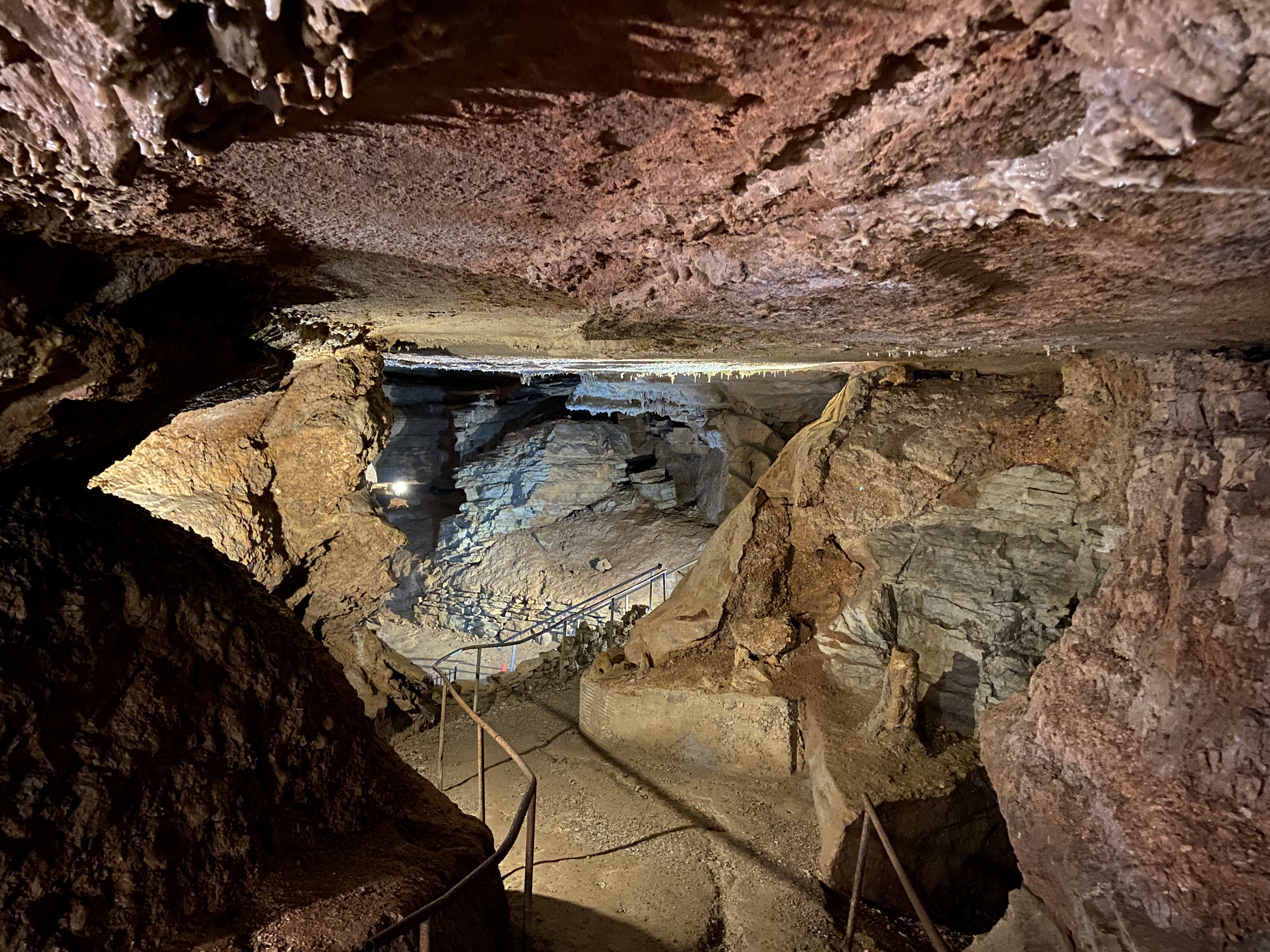
Council Room in cave interior

In the days when Spain ruled over Arkansas, conquistadors had been raiding the Aztecs and Mayans in Mexico and South America, and were travelling through the Ozarks when a blizzard forced them to take shelter in the cave. They hid the gold and camped in a cavern called the Council Room, which has a natural chimney in the formation.

While in the Ozarks, they destroyed a Native American village and only a few villagers survived. The survivors found the conquistadors from their campfire smoke and killed them all in revenge. Before the last conquistador died, he made two maps: one on parchment paper, and another carved in a limestone rock outside the cave that has eroded some over time.

In 1885, a man in Madrid found a map in a family Bible, which also led him to the map etched in limestone. He found the cave, but not the hidden gold. He did not stay long, due to ill health.

Then in the 1900s, George Dunbar looked for the gold while pretending to run a mining company. He found a few pieces of the plundered gold.

During a recent drought, a new clue was found: on a wall that's usually not accessible because of spring waters, a series of symbols were found that pointed to a hidden room with a large pool. Unfortunately, as they started exploring that room the rains returned and flooded the room again.

The treasure has been estimated today at well over $40 million and has not been found yet. There have been artifacts found in the cavern, such as helmets, pieces of armor and weapons dating back to the time of the conquistadors. A few gold coins have also been reportedly found. The hunt still goes on today. The cave has never been fully explored, and new territories are charted every year.
