= Senator Hendren =

Senator Hendren may refer to:

- Jim Hendren (born 1963), Arkansas State Senate
- Kim Hendren (born 1938), Arkansas State Senate
