= Bolin Barn and Smokehouse =

- U.S. National Register of Historic Places
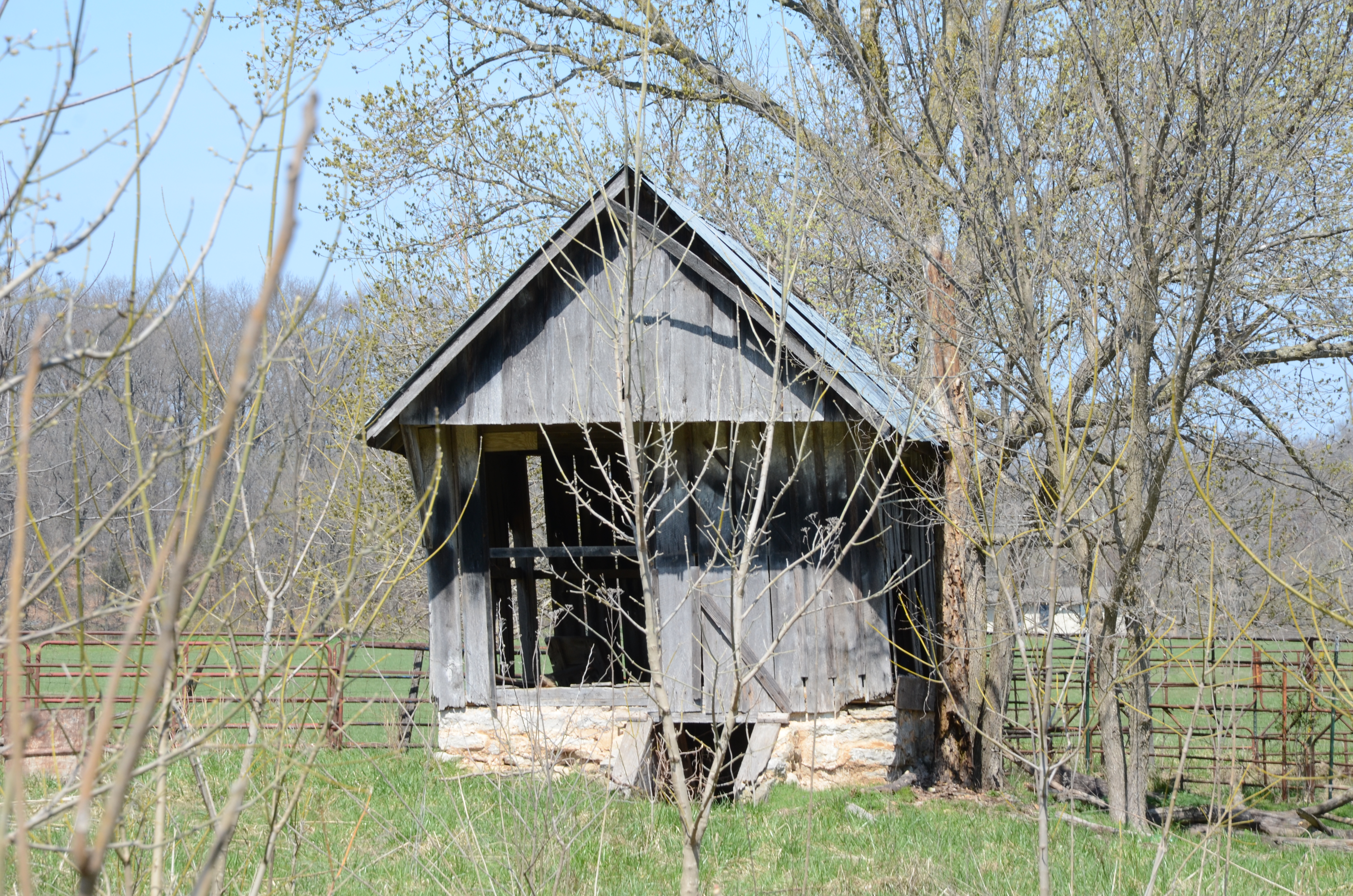

- Location within Arkansas Location within the United States
- Nearest city: Gravette, Arkansas
- Coordinates: 36°23′55″N 94°23′11″W
- Area: 1.5 acres (0.61 ha)
- Built: 1890
- MPS: Benton County MRA
- NRHP reference No.: 87002359
- Added to NRHP: January 28, 1988

The Bolin Barn and Smokehouse are a pair of historic agricultural outbuildings in rural Benton County, Arkansas. They are located on either side of Fruitwood Road (County Road 36) southeast of Gravette, just before its crossing of Spavinaw Creek. The barn, built c. 1930, has a gambrel roof and a distinctive ventilation system that includes two cupolas and a trellis-like arrangement at the eaves. The smokehouse, built c. 1890, is a box form with board-and-batten siding and a gable roof with a projecting front gable. Although its form is typical, it also provides access to a root cellar underneath, an unusual feature.

The buildings were listed on the National Register of Historic Places in 1988.

== See also ==
- National Register of Historic Places listings in Benton County, Arkansas
