= Mary Lou Slinkard =

American politician

Mary Lou Spradling Slinkard

Member of the Arkansas House of Representatives from the 100th district
- In office January 2009 – January 2013
- Preceded by: Daryl Pace
- Succeeded by: Karen Hopper

Member of the Arkansas House of Representatives from the 92nd district
- In office January 2013 – January 2015
- Preceded by: Greg Leding
- Succeeded by: Kim Hendren

Personal details
- Born: August 1943 (age 82) Gravette, Benton County; Arkansas, USA
- Party: Republican
- Children: Two daughters
- Occupation: Retired Benton County clerk

Mary Lou Spradling Slinkard (born August 1943) is a Republican former member of the Arkansas House of Representatives. From 2013 to 2015, she represented District 92 in Benton County in far northwestern Arkansas. From 2009 to 2013, she was the representative for District 100.

A native and a resident of Gravette, she is the former county clerk of Benton County, a position in which she served for twenty-eight years. She assumed the representative's position in 2009 and was reelected without opposition in the general elections of 2010 and 2012.

Slinkard had a primary opponent in 2012, Jim Parsons. Her district includes the city of Bella Vista, once represented by Republican Donna Hutchinson, a former representative from District 98.

A conservative lawmaker, Slinkard in 2013 voted to override Democratic Governor Mike Beebe's vetoes bills to restrict abortion access. She voted to prohibit abortion coverage in state employees health insurance plans. Slinkard also voted to override Beebe's veto of the law requiring photo identification as a condition for voting in Arkansas. She voted to place a spending cap on state spending, but the measure failed by two House votes. She voted to allow university staff to engage in concealed carry of a handgun for campus safety. Slinkard serves on three House committees: (1) City, County and Local Affairs, (2) Judiciary, and (3) Legislative Joint Audit Committee. She is a member of the American Legislative Exchange Council (ALEC).

Slinkard was term-limited under state law in 2014. Former State Senator Kim Hendren, also of Gravette, was elected at the age of seventy-six, to succeed her in the state House. Henderen also served in the state House for the term from 2001 to 2003.

Preceded by Daryl Pace	Arkansas State Representative for District 100 (Benton County); 2009–2013	Succeeded by Karen Hopper
Preceded by Greg Leding (transferred to District 86)	Arkansas State Representative for District 92 (Benton County); 2013–2015	Succeeded by Kim Hendren
