= In-joke =

Humour only specific people understand

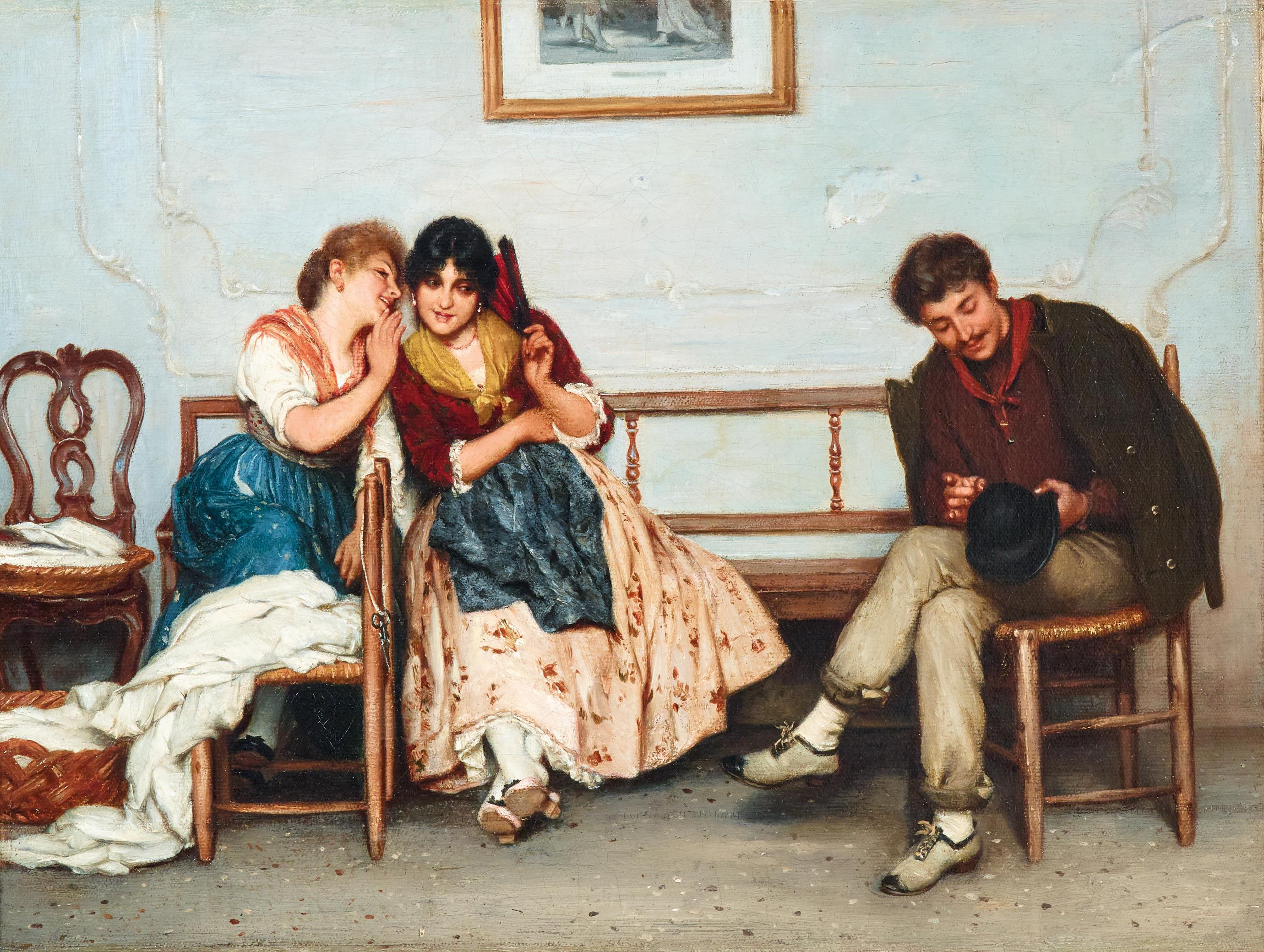
- Secret, by Eugen von Blaas
- Alternative names: in-joke; inside joke; private joke
- Type of joke: Esoteric

An in-joke, also known as an inside joke or a private joke, is a joke with humour that is understandable only to members of an in-group; that is, people who are in a particular social group, occupation, or other community of shared interest. It is, therefore, an esoteric joke, only humorous to those who are aware of the circumstances behind it.

Typically, inside jokes use a reference in the punchline to imply that which is associated with the reference. Often, this reference refers to the punchline of another joke which was already heard by the in-group.

In-jokes may exist within a small social clique, such as a group of friends, or extend to an entire profession or other relatively large group. When the in-group only includes people which heard the previous portion of a comedic set, the type of inside joke is known as a callback.

An example is:

Q: What's yellow and equivalent to the axiom of choice?
A: Zorn's lemon.

Individuals not familiar with the mathematical result Zorn's lemma are unlikely to understand the joke. The joke is a pun on the name of this result.

Ethnic or religious groups may also have in-jokes.

== Philosophy ==
In-jokes are cryptic allusions to shared common ground that act as selective triggers; only those who share that common ground are able to respond appropriately. An in-joke may be used to build community, sometimes at the expense of outsiders. Part of the power of an in-joke is that its audience knows that many do not understand it.

An in-joke can also be used as a subtext, where people in the know may find humor in something not explicitly spoken. They may even apologize for doing so to a rookie, directly or indirectly stating that what they were laughing at was an in-joke.

== See also ==
- Shibboleth
- Cultural appropriation
- Fictitious entry
- Mathematical joke
- Military humor
- Order of the Occult Hand
- Dog-whistle politics
