= Jeremy Young Hutchinson =

American politician

Jeremy Hutchinson

Member of the Arkansas Senate
- In office January 1, 2013 – August 31, 2018
- Preceded by: Joyce Elliott
- Constituency: 33rd district
- In office January 10, 2011 – January 1, 2013
- Preceded by: Shane Broadway
- Succeeded by: David Burnett
- Constituency: 22nd district

Member of the Arkansas House of Representatives
- In office January 13, 2003 – January 2007
- Preceded by: Charles Ormond
- Succeeded by: Dan Greenberg
- Constituency: 31st district
- In office March 7, 2000 – January 13, 2003
- Preceded by: Ted Thomas
- Succeeded by: Denny Sumpter
- Constituency: 53rd district

Personal details
- Born: Jeremy Young Hutchinson; March 4, 1974 (age 52) Kansas City, Kansas, U.S.
- Party: Republican
- Relatives: Tim Hutchinson (father); Donna Hutchinson (mother); Asa Hutchinson (uncle); Kim Hendren (uncle); Timothy Chad Hutchinson (twin brother); Jim Hendren (cousin)
- Education: Harding University (BA); University of Arkansas, Little Rock (JD)

Jeremy Young Hutchinson (born March 4, 1974) is a former politician. A Republican, he served in the Arkansas State Senate for District 33 in the capital city of Little Rock, Arkansas. He served in the Arkansas House of Representatives from two different districts in Pulaski County and as a state senator.

He was indicted in 2018 by a federal jury on 12 charges of wire and tax fraud. Hutchinson resigned his office the same day. On June 25, 2019, Hutchinson pleaded guilty to bribery and conspiracy, as well as the aforementioned wire and tax fraud. He was sentenced to 46 months prison. On May 29, 2025, Hutchinson received a full pardon from President Donald Trump.

== Political career ==
Hutchinson was first elected to the Arkansas House in March 2000, as representative of Arkansas District 31, Pulaski County. At the time he was the youngest member of the Arkansas House. He was re-elected three times and served on the House Judiciary and Insurance and Commerce committees. He was the vice-chair of the Joint Energy Committee and the assistant minority leader from 2002 to 2004.

On August 4, 2009, Hutchinson announced his intent to run for the Arkansas State Senate from District 22, Pulaski County. On May 18, 2010, he defeated Dan Greenberg, son of the columnist Paul Greenberg, in the Republican primary, 58 to 42 percent. On November 2, 2010, Hutchinson defeated Democratic nominee Dawn Creekmore to claim the District 22 Senate seat. He was re-elected in 2013.

Jeremy Hutchinson was named to Arkansas Business's "40 under 40" in 2002. He served on the board of the Arkansas Council on Economic Education. His biography states that in 2005, he was voted "Best Conservative" by readers of the Arkansas Times.

=== Conviction and resignation ===
On August 31, 2018, the U.S. Department of Justice announced that Hutchinson was indicted by a federal grand jury on 12 wire and tax fraud charges. Hutchinson resigned his office the same day. He faced "eight counts of wire fraud for spending the campaign funds on personal expenses and falsifying campaign reports and four counts of filing false tax returns from 2011 to 2014." On June 25, 2019, Hutchinson pleaded guilty to "bribery, tax fraud, wire fraud, and conspiracy in connection with a multi-district investigation into spanning the Western and Eastern Districts of Arkansas and the Western District of Missouri."

On December 29, 2022, Hutchinson was sentenced to 19 days in jail for criminal contempt of court, after failing to pay nearly $524,000 in child support payments. On February 3, 2023 in connection with his guilty plea, Hutchinson was sentenced to 46 months prison by US District Judge Kristine Baker and ordered to pay fines of $224,497.10 to the State of Arkansas and $131,038 to the IRS. In May 2025, President Trump pardoned Hutchinson.

== Family and personal life ==
Hutchinson and his identical twin brother Timothy Chad Hutchinson are the sons of former U.S. Senator Tim Hutchinson and nephews of the Governor of Arkansas, Asa Hutchinson. Timothy Chad Hutchinson represented District 95, Benton County, from 2005 to 2011.

Hutchinson is a nephew by marriage of former state senator Kim Hendren of Gravette, Benton County. Kim Hendren's son Jim Hendren, District 2 state senator from Benton County and the senate majority leader, is Hutchinson's cousin.

In 2006, Hutchinson's mother, Donna Jean King Hutchinson of Bella Vista, Arkansas, was elected to the state House from District 98 in Benton County. She served four two-year terms.

Hutchinson and his former wife were divorced in 2011. He and his former spouse both used alternate forms of their names in that filing; he filed for divorce under his middle name, "Young Hutchinson." On September 4, 2012, Hutchinson's ex-girlfriend, Julie McGee, was arrested for third-degree domestic battery at Hutchinson's Chenal Woods condominium in Little Rock after she hit Hutchinson with a preserved alligator head and left him with a bleeding wound. According to journalist Max Brantley, McGee had said that she had a financial support agreement with Hutchinson. Shortly thereafter, Hutchinson formally requested that the prosecuting attorney drop the battery charges so that he could "move on without any further embarrassment.

In 2013, Hutchinson participated in "active shooter" training and mistakenly shot a teacher with a rubber bullet who was confronting a so-called "bad guy". The experience gave Hutchinson "some pause" but failed to shake his confidence in the training plan.

== See also ==
- List of people granted executive clemency in the second Trump presidency
