= Sellers Farm =

Historic house in Arkansas, United States

- Sellers Farm (Destroyed)
- Formerly listed on the U.S. National Register of Historic Places
- Location within Arkansas Location within the United States
- Location: off Arkansas Highway 43, Maysville, Arkansas
- Coordinates: 36°24′20″N 94°36′7″W
- Area: less than one acre
- Built: 1910
- MPS: Benton County MRA
- NRHP reference No.: 87002369

Significant dates
- Added to NRHP: January 28, 1988
- Removed from NRHP: October 14, 2026

The Sellers Farm was a historic farmstead in Maysville, Arkansas, USA. The main house was a two-story I-house with a rear wing giving it an overall T configuration. The main facade faced west and was covered by a porch that extended the full width on the first floor, and for three of the five bays on the second. There was a front-facing gable above the three center bays. Built c. 1910, it was an example of a little-altered I-house. Outbuildings on the property included a feed barn, chicken house, milk shed and privy. All of the buildings on the property were in Arkansas although the associated land extended into neighboring Oklahoma.

The property was listed on the National Register of Historic Places in 1988, at which time most of its outbuildings were described as being in fair-to-poor condition, with the house in good condition, but the house and most, if not all, of the outbuildings have since been destroyed.

== See also ==
- National Register of Historic Places listings in Benton County, Arkansas
