= Sulphur Springs Park Reserve =

- U.S. National Register of Historic Places
- U.S. Historic district
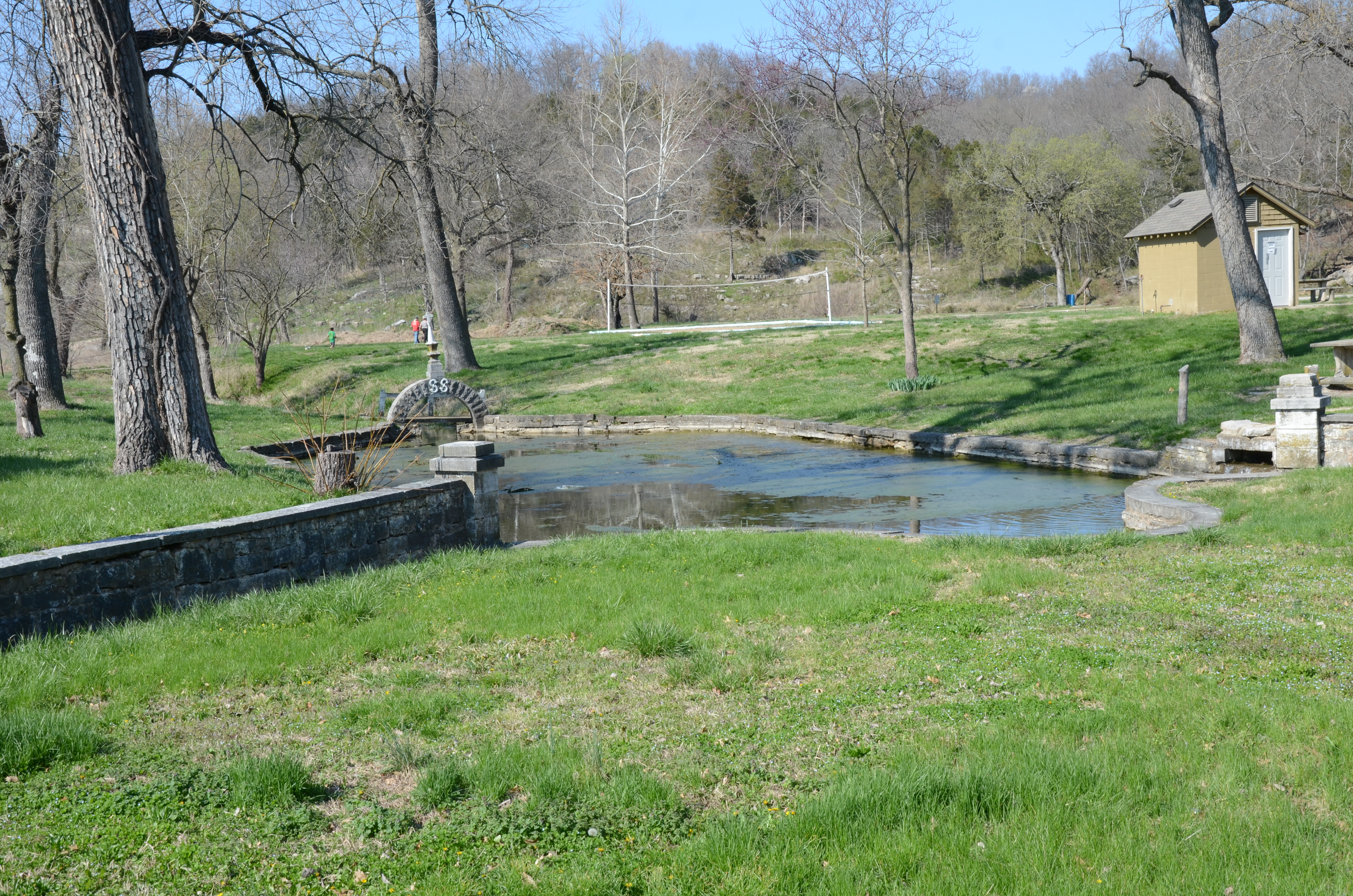

- Location within Arkansas Location within the United States
- Location: AR 59, Sulphur Springs, Benton County, Arkansas
- Area: 16.5 acres (6.7 ha)
- Built by: Bills, Dr. A.R.
- Architectural style: Bungalow/American Craftsman
- NRHP reference No.: 99000791
- Added to NRHP: July 8, 1999

The Sulphur Springs Park Reserve is a historic former spa area at the heart of Sulphur Springs, Benton County, Arkansas. The area is 16.5 acres (6.7 ha) bounded on the east by Lake La Balladine, impounded by a dam on Butler Creek.

The park has modern amenities: the entrance sign lists courts and fields for tennis, basketball, baseball, and soccer; RV and tent camping, and picnic tables; swimming and fishing; and a playground.

Central to the park is Lake La Balladine (meaning, the dancer) which is fed by Butler Creek, and four of the mineral springs that gave Sulphur Springs its name.

== History ==
In anticipation of the railroad's arrival, Charles Hibler had Sulphur Springs platted to sell plots of land, and he and his wife built cottages, a hotel, and bathhouse to encourage visitors to come to the budding spa town. Between 1889 and 1891, the Kansas City Southern Railway built a rail to Sulphur Springs. At this same time, in 1889, Hibler and the new town drained the lake and discovered three more mineral springs, which are in this park.

For at least a time in the early 1900s, the park was named Edson Park, in honor of Job A. Edson the president of Kansas City Southern Railway.

At its largest, the park extended across what is now State Highway 5 to E. Patterson St., and then across Patterson was the reserve which was also a greenspace where a few large hotels were erected. US Highway 71 (now the state highway) cut through the park in 1926.

== Historical features ==
In addition to modern features, the park also has historic areas that were listed on the National Register of Historic Places in 1999.

=== Shingle cottage (Eaton home) ===
This Craftsman-style shingle cottage is painted green and has a modest porch and front door that face State Highway 59 south of the park entrance.

It was built in the early 1920s by Walter Eaton, a retired oilman who in 1921 established nearby Ozark Colony, the artistic and intellectual recreation-based cooperative. The Colony was on the other side of the lake from this park.

=== Sulphur Springs Museum (Burger Baths) ===
This is the middle of the three historic homes in the park facing State Highway 59. It is marked with street signage and street lamps for its walkway, and a sign with a naked man wrapped in a spa towel.

The building was originally a bathhouse. It was built in 1924 on top of a sulphur well, which supplied the building with hot mineral baths. Frank and Ann Burger bought several lots of property in the town as a real estate venture, to sell to others. They also ran this the bathhouse and it became the "Burger Baths for Health", with a road sign punning with misspelled words, "I Have Been Steamed & Tubed & Rubed And I Feel Like A Fox". Customers could get mineral water baths, salt rubs, and massages.

More recently the building was used as the city hall before housing the museum. The museum is open only a few hours per month.

=== Burger home ===
This is the northern-most home in the park area facing State Highway 59. It also is a Craftsman-style building, made of limestone. Frank and Ann Burger lived in this home while running the Burger Baths business next door.

It continues to be a private residence.

=== Lithia Spring shelter and goldfish pond ===
Going from the Burger home north alongside State Highway 59 is a paved walkway to the northern point of the park. It leads to the lithia spring, a fish pond, and Butler Creek (the creek that feeds into the park's Lake La Balladine).

This spring was the first in the park to be discovered. There is a shelter over the spring, and limestone benches alongside it that were carved from the nearby bluff in 1889.

Next to the spring shelter is a goldfish pond within a limestone wall. It was built in the 1920s.

=== Lake La Balladine dam ===
A dam holds back the lake from Butler Creek and the lithia spring. The original dam was built in 1889 and is attributed to Dr. Alvin R. Bills, a medical doctor who moved to the town that same year and who died a few years later.

In 1956, the dam washed out. Twenty years later, the town rebuilt the southern part of the dam with concrete, while the northern section still has some of the original stacked limestones.

=== Mineral springs courtyard ===
Inside the park behind the green shingle cottage and the museum are three of the park's mineral springs, each with a hand pump and covered shelter, and signs that list their purported benefits:

- "Alkaline Magnesia for Stomach and Intestinal Conditions"
- "White Sulphur Spring for Liver Problems"
- "Black Sulphur Spring for Chronic Malaria"

=== Lily pond, arch, and footbridge ===
On the north side of the mineral springs courtyard is a lily pond fed by the mineral springs and contained within a wall of stacked limestone. It is decorated with a limestone arch and footbridge decorated with the letters "SS" (Sulphur Springs). Dr. Alvin R. Bills, who built the original dam, also built this wall at the same time.

=== Gazebo ===
Across Fair Avenue from the mineral springs is a wooden gazebo. This used to be the center of the park and reserve, before State Highway 59 was built through the park in 1926. It has been restored to maintain its original appearance.

== See also ==
- National Register of Historic Places listings in Benton County, Arkansas
