= Gayla Hendren McKenzie =

American politician

Gayla Joy Hendren McKenzie is a lawyer and state legislator in Arkansas, serving in the Arkansas House of Representatives. In 2021, she began her second term. She represents District 92 which includes portions of Benton County, Arkansas. She is a member of the Republican Party.

== Biography ==
She lives in Gravette and is married with two children. Kim Hendren is her father, and former legislator Jim Hendren is her brother. Her sister, Hope Hendren Duke, is also a member of the state house. She established and ran a radio station for more than two decades and later owned a stone business. The radio station is KBVA.
