= Dan Greenberg =

American politician

Member of the Arkansas House of Representatives from the 31st district
- In office 2006–2011
- Preceded by: Jeremy Hutchinson
- Succeeded by: David J. Sanders

Personal details
- Born: December 9, 1965 (age 60)
- Party: Republican
- Spouse: Marjorie
- Children: 3
- Profession: Lawyer, politician, president of Advance Arkansas Institute
- Website: www.dan-greenberg.com

Daniel Greenberg (born December 9, 1965) is an American nonprofit executive and former politician. He is a former Republican member of the Arkansas House of Representatives, who served from 2006 through 2011. Greenberg, who lives in Little Rock, Arkansas, represented House District 31, which includes portions of Pulaski and Saline counties.

== Early life and education ==
Greenberg is the son of Pulitzer Prize-winning syndicated columnist Paul Greenberg of the Arkansas Democrat Gazette.

Greenberg received a B.A. (honors) in philosophy from Brown University in Providence, Rhode Island, in 1988, and an M.A. in philosophy from Bowling Green State University in Bowling Green, Ohio, in 1990. He graduated from law school in 2007, receiving his J.D. from the William H. Bowen School of Law at the University of Arkansas at Little Rock. While a law student, he served as chief articles editor of the Law Review. He also studied law for a year at the University of Chicago.

== Career ==
Greenberg was an analyst at The Heritage Foundation, a writer for the libertarian Cato Institute, and a teacher at the high school and college level in the fields of philosophy, political science, and computer programming. He published over 100 articles on government and public policy in newspapers, magazines, and academic journals, including for The New York Times, National Review, The Monist, and the Ohio State Law Journal. He has been president of the Advance Arkansas Institute, senior counsel for the Center for Class Action Fairness, and chair of Arkansas's Alcoholic Beverage Commission. In 2017, he was appointed senior policy advisor to the Secretary at the U.S. Department of Labor in Washington, D.C.

In 1996, as policy director for then Arkansas governor Mike Huckabee, Greenberg was named to the Arkansas Business "40 under 40" list of leaders in business and government. He has previously taught at the Arkansas Governor's School and the University of Arkansas at Little Rock's W.H. Bowen School of Law.

== Political career ==
Before his election to the state legislature in June 2006, at the age of 40, Greenberg served most of two terms as a justice of the peace (county legislator) on Pulaski County, Arkansas' Quorum Court.

When he ran for the state legislature in 2006, he was endorsed by the incumbent in the seat, Jeremy Hutchinson, who was prohibited by term limits for running for reelection. Greenberg and Hutchinson had run against each other for the seat in 1999 as primary opponents, an election that Hutchinson won. In May and June 2006, Greenberg placed first in the district's hotly contested primary and runoff and was elected to succeed Hutchinson in the legislative seat for which the two had once competed.

Greenberg served on the Public Transportation and State Agencies committees. He was vice chairman of the State Agencies subcommittee on Constitutional Issues.

Greenberg made national news when he proposed the "Edifice Complex Prevention Act" barring naming public facilities after living people. "In the old days we had a tradition of waiting to judge a person's whole life before we named a building after them," said Greenberg.

After being elected two terms as Arkansas State Representative, Greenberg ran for the District 21 seat in the Arkansas State Senate. He lost to Jeremy Hutchinson in the 2010 Republican primary.
