= Kindley House =

Historic house in Arkansas, United States

- U.S. National Register of Historic Places
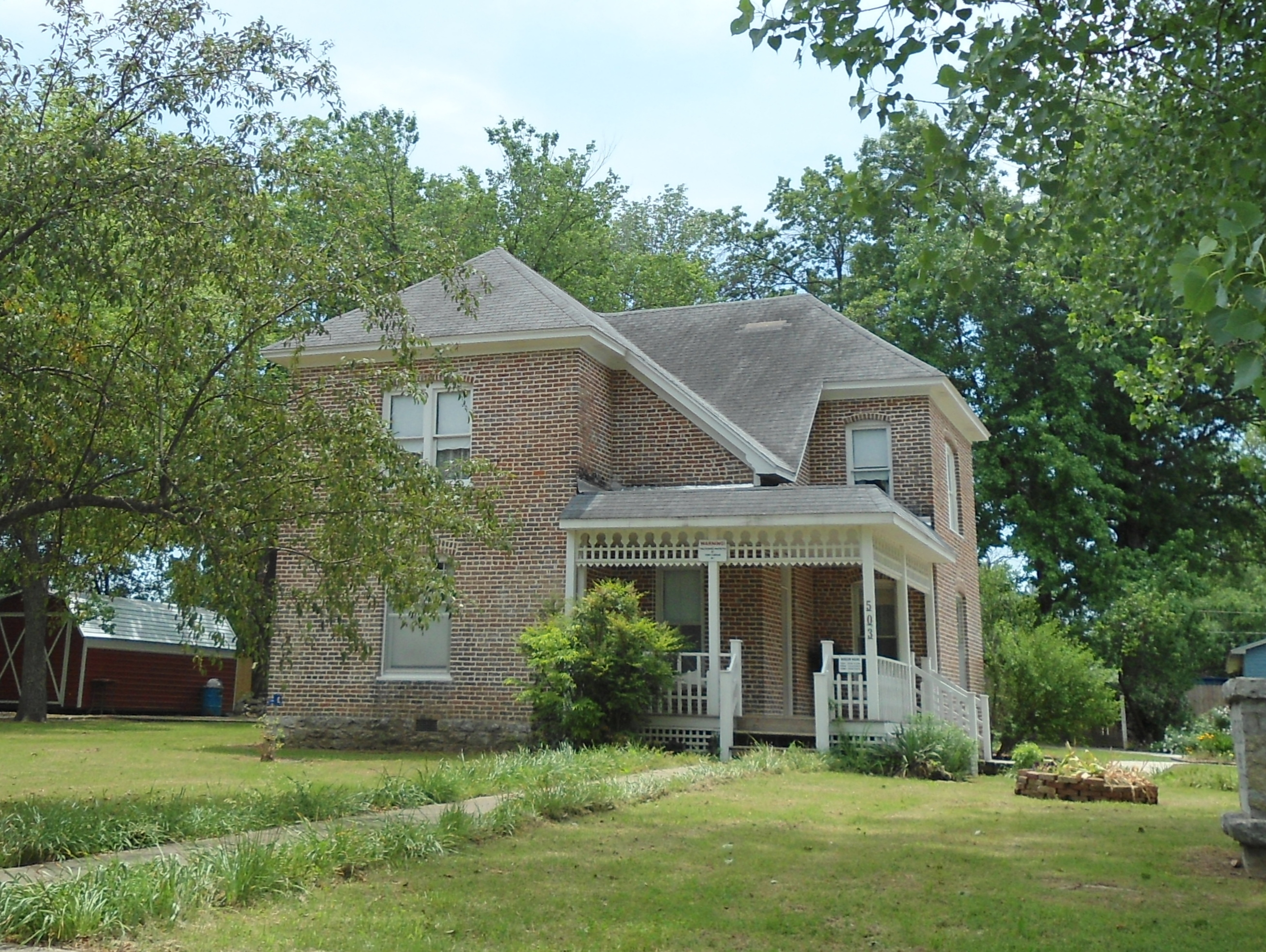

- Location within Arkansas Location within the United States
- Location: 503 Charlotte St., Gravette, Arkansas
- Coordinates: 36°25′9″N 94°26′52″W
- Area: less than one acre
- Built: 1873
- Architectural style: Italianate
- MPS: Benton County MRA
- NRHP reference No.: 87002356
- Added to NRHP: January 28, 1988

The Kindley House is a historic house at 503 Charlotte Street in Gravette, Arkansas, United States. It is a two-story brick building, set on a heavy stone foundation, with a hip roof and an L-shape configuration that includes a small single-story section in the crook of the L. There is a porch that is decorated with heavy Italianate scrollwork. Built in the 1870s of locally made brick, it is one of a number of high-quality Italianate brick houses in Benton County.

The house was listed on the National Register of Historic Places in 1988.

The Kindley House is now home to the Gravette Historical Museum.

== See also ==
- National Register of Historic Places listings in Benton County, Arkansas
