= Gravette School District =

School district in Arkansas, United States

Location
- 609 Birmingham SE; Gravette, Arkansas 72736 United States

District information
- Grades: PK–12
- Superintendent: Jeff Gravette
- Accreditations: ADE; AdvancED
- Schools: 4
- NCES District ID: 0506840

Students and staff
- Students: 1,844
- Teachers: 119.45 (on FTE basis)
- Student–teacher ratio: 15.44
- District mascot: Lion
- Colors: Black Orange

Other information
- Website: www.gravetteschools.net

Gravette School District is a public school district based in Gravette, Arkansas, United States. The Gravette School District provides early childhood, elementary and secondary education for more than 1,800 pre-kindergarten through grade 12 students at its four facilities.

Gravette School District and all of its schools are accredited by the Arkansas Department of Education (ADE) and AdvancED.

The district includes the majority of Gravette, as well as all of Maysville and Sulphur Springs, and a section of Bella Vista.

== Schools ==
- Gravette High School—grades 9 through 12.
- Gravette Middle School—grades 6 through 8.
- Gravette Upper Elementary School—grades 3 through 5.
- Glenn Duffy Elementary School—pre-kindergarten through grade 2.
