= Tim Hutchinson =

American politician (born 1949)

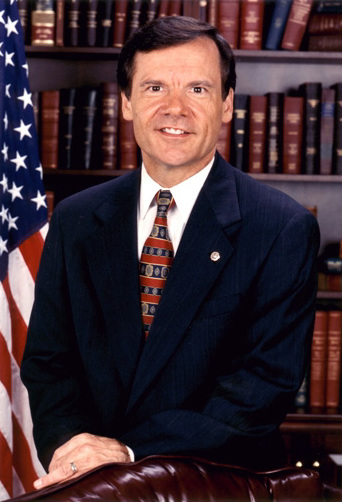

United States Senator from Arkansas
- In office January 3, 1997 – January 3, 2003
- Preceded by: David Pryor
- Succeeded by: Mark Pryor

Member of the U.S. House of Representatives from Arkansas's 3rd district
- In office January 3, 1993 – January 2, 1997
- Preceded by: John P. Hammerschmidt
- Succeeded by: Asa Hutchinson

Member of the Arkansas House of Representatives from the 1st district
- In office 1985–1993
- Preceded by: Clayton Little
- Succeeded by: Railey Steele

Personal details
- Born: Young Timothy Hutchinson; August 11, 1949 (age 77) Bentonville, Arkansas, U.S.
- Party: Republican
- Spouse(s): Donna King (m. 1970; div. 1999) Randi Fredholm (m. 2000)
- Children: 3, including Jeremy and Timothy
- Relatives: Asa Hutchinson (brother); Kim Hendren (brother-in-law); Jim Hendren (nephew)
- Education: Bob Jones University (BA); University of Arkansas (MA)

Young Timothy Hutchinson (born August 11, 1949) is an American politician, lobbyist, and former United States senator from the U.S. state of Arkansas. A member of the Republican Party, he was the first Republican U.S. senator to represent Arkansas since the Reconstruction era.

== Personal life ==
Hutchinson was born in Bentonville, Arkansas, the son of John Malcolm Hutchinson, Sr. (1907–1991) and Coral Virginia (Mount) Hutchinson (1912–1998). He was raised on the family farm in nearby Gravette. He graduated with a Bachelor of Arts degree from Bob Jones University and received a Master of Arts degree in political science from the University of Arkansas (1990).

He currently is a lobbyist and is a resident of Alexandria, Virginia. He is married to Randi Fredholm Hutchinson, an attorney in Washington, D.C. He was the first Republican to have been elected to the U.S. Senate in Arkansas since 1879.

== Early political career ==
Hutchinson served in the Arkansas House of Representatives representing part of Fort Smith from 1985 to 1992. In 1992, he ran for the Republican nomination in Arkansas's 3rd congressional district after the popular 26-year incumbent John Paul Hammerschmidt announced his retirement. He defeated a fellow Republican state lawmaker Richard L. Barclay of Rogers, for the Republican nomination. He faced Democrat John VanWinkle, an attorney from Fayetteville, in the general election, and won by only 7,500 votes—a margin of five percent. He owed his victory to a 10,000-vote margin in his native Benton County. It was the second-closest margin in the 3rd, one of the most Republican districts in the South, which Hammerschmidt had represented since January 1967. The only closer race was in 1974, when Bill Clinton came within 6,300 votes of ousting Hammerschmidt. Clinton narrowly carried the 3rd in his successful run for president, a presumed factor in the closeness of the 1992 congressional race.

The district reverted to form in 1994, and Hutchinson was reelected with 63 percent of the vote.

== United States Senator ==
=== 1996 election ===
Hutchinson ran for the Senate seat being vacated by popular Democrat David Pryor in 1996. Initially, the leading Republican candidate was Lieutenant Governor Mike Huckabee. When Democratic Governor Jim Guy Tucker resigned after being convicted of mail fraud, however, Huckabee assumed the governorship and dropped out of the Senate race; Hutchinson entered soon after and captured the Republican nomination. He would face state Attorney General Winston Bryant in the general election. Even though native son Bill Clinton carried the state by a 17-point margin over Bob Dole in the presidential race, Hutchinson defeated Bryant 53–47% in the Senate election, largely by running up the votes in his congressional district. He became the first Republican Senator from Arkansas since Reconstruction, and the first to be popularly elected.

=== Tenure ===
Hutchinson opposes abortion, supports tax cuts, supports de-regulation of the economy, supports the death penalty and a Constitutional amendment banning flag burning, opposes same-sex marriage, and opposes expanding hate crimes legislation. In 1998, Hutchinson joined two other Republican Senators, Bob Smith of New Hampshire and James Inhofe of Oklahoma, in opposing President Bill Clinton's nomination of James Hormel, an openly gay man, as U.S. Ambassador to Luxembourg. Hormel was later confirmed as ambassador in a recess appointment.

He served on the Armed Services Committee, Aging Committee, Health, Education, Labor, and Pensions Committee, and Veterans' Affairs Committee. He was one of 16 co-sponsors of the Iraq Resolution (S.J.RES.46).

Senator Hutchinson honored the Little Rock Nine in the award ceremony for their Congressional Medals of Honor.

=== 2002 election ===
Hutchinson faced Arkansas Attorney General Mark Pryor, David Pryor's son, in his 2002 re-election campaign. During his term as U.S. Senator, Hutchinson had divorced his wife of almost three decades, Donna, a former Arkansas state representative, and married an aide in 2000. Hutchinson denied any impropriety, and Pryor refused to make the matter an issue in the campaign, but the well-publicized divorce substantially hurt his popularity. Pryor was also helped by the presence of his still popular father in a campaign commercial. Hutchinson lost to Pryor by eight points, making him the only Republican incumbent to be defeated that year.

== Post-political career ==
Hutchinson joined the Washington, D.C.–based law firm of Dickstein Shapiro in January 2003 as a senior adviser. He later served as a senior director at the Washington, D.C. office of Greenberg Traurig.

== Family ==
Hutchinson married his second wife, Randi Fredholm Hutchinson, a former senior member of staff, in 2000. He and his first wife, Donna Hutchinson, divorced in 1999 after 29 years. They have three sons: Jeremy Hutchinson, a former state representative; Timothy Chad Hutchinson, also a former state legislator; and Joshua Luke Hutchinson. On January 8, 2021, a lobbying report shows that Hutchinson paid The Tolman Group $10,000 to lobby for a pardon from Donald Trump for Jeremy, who had been convicted of bribery and tax fraud; however, President Trump did not pardon him.

Hutchinson's brother is former Arkansas governor Asa Hutchinson, a Republican who succeeded him as member of the U.S. House of Representatives from Arkansas's 3rd congressional district, the former undersecretary of the United States Department of Homeland Security, and the unsuccessful Republican gubernatorial nominee in 2006, the same year that Donna Hutchinson was elected to the state House.

Tim and Asa Hutchinson are the brothers-in-law of Arkansas State Senator Kim Hendren, who married their sister, Marylea, in 1958. Hendren was a candidate for the Republican nomination for U.S. Senate in the 2010 election. On May 18, he lost the primary to Congressman John Boozman, who would be elected later that year. Kim Hendren's son, Jim Hendren, was elected in 2012 to the District 2 seat from Benton County in the Arkansas State Senate.

== Electoral history ==
2002 Arkansas U.S. Senate Republican primary
Party	Candidate	Votes	%
Republican	Tim Hutchinson (incumbent)	71,576	77.7%
Republican	Jim Bob Duggar	20,546	22.3%
Total votes		92,116	100.0%

U.S. House of Representatives
Preceded by John P. Hammerschmidt	Member of the U.S. House of Representatives from Arkansas's 3rd congressional district 1993–1997	Succeeded by Asa Hutchinson
Party political offices
Preceded by Mike Huckabee; Withdrew	Republican nominee for U.S. Senator from Arkansas (Class 2); 1996, 2002	Vacant Title next held by Tom Cotton; 2014
U.S. Senate
Preceded by David Pryor	U.S. Senator (Class 2) from Arkansas; 1997–2003; Served alongside: Dale Bumpers, Blanche Lincoln	Succeeded by Mark Pryor
U.S. order of precedence (ceremonial)
Preceded by Mark Kirk as Former U.S. Senator	Order of precedence of the United States	Succeeded by Mark Dayton as Former U.S. Senator
