= Sulphur Springs, Benton County, Arkansas =

City in Benton County, Arkansas, United States

Sulphur Springs, Arkansas
- City
- Location of Sulphur Springs in Benton County, Arkansas
- Coordinates: 36°29′01″N 94°27′33″W
- Country: United States
- State: Arkansas
- County: Benton

Area
  - Total: 1.02 sq mi (2.63 km^{2})
  - Land: 1.01 sq mi (2.62 km^{2})
  - Water: 0.0039 sq mi (0.01 km^{2})
- Elevation: 909 ft (277 m)

Population (2020)
  - Total: 481
  - Estimate (2025): 483 ▲
  - Density: 476.0/sq mi (183.78/km^{2})
- Time zone: UTC-6 (Central (CST))
  - Summer (DST): UTC-5 (CDT)
- ZIP code: 72768
- Area code: 479
- FIPS code: 05-67760
- GNIS feature ID: 2405541
- Website: sulphurspringsar.gov

Sulphur Springs is a city in Benton County, Arkansas, United States. The population was 481 at the 2020 census. It is part of the Northwest Arkansas region.

== History ==
Sulphur Springs got its start in 1885 as a mineral spa resort.

== Geography ==
Sulphur Springs is located in northwest Benton County. The city center is about one mile south of the Missouri-Arkansas state line. Arkansas Highway 59 runs through the city, leading north to Noel, Missouri, and south to Gravette. According to the United States Census Bureau, the city has a total area of 1.0 square mile (2.6 km^{2}), all land.

Sulphur Springs is in the Springfield Plateau subregion of the Ozarks. It has porous rocks through which rain easily can pass underground to the aquifers. When water in aquifers flow down a hillside, or are pushed up to the surface, this causes a spring. The springs in Sulphur Springs are exceptionally rich in several minerals, and historically the springs were labeled to indicate the purported mineral found in each:

- Black sulphur: Water with hydrogen sulfide that has come into contact with a metal such as iron, which then corrodes to create ferrous sulfide
- Chalybeate: High in iron salts, especially ferrous bicarbonate
- Lithium salts: A rare mineral water
- Magnesia: High in magnesium, often magnesium carbonate
- Nitre: High in potassium nitrate, also known as saltpeter
- Potash sulphur: Containing potassium and sulfur
- White sulphur: Containing a high concentration of sulfur compounds, especially hydrogen sulfide gas and sulfates. "White" meant colorless.

== Ozark Colony ==
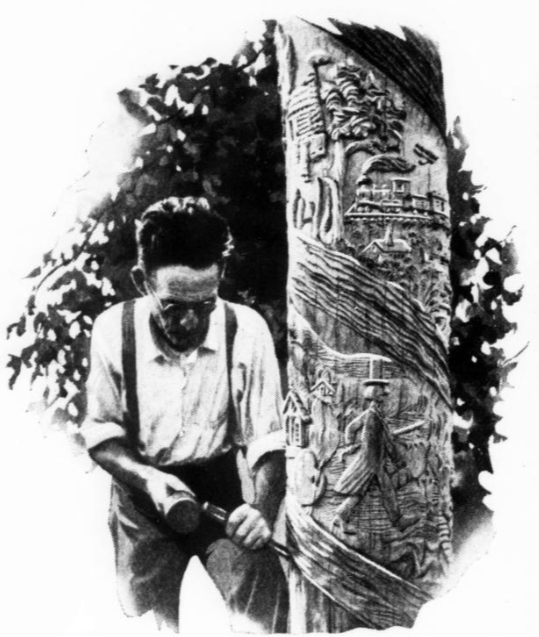
Artist Jim Sease carving totem pole for Ozark Colony

Ozark Colony was originally a nearby community, but now is a Sulphur Springs neighborhood. In 1921, Walter R. Eaton, a retired oilman, established the colony with $25,000 capital (equivalent to about $436,200 in 2024) as an intellectual and artistic recreation-based cooperative: people would buy a plot of land and agree to work in community-held ventures with the proceeds going toward their vacation expenses in the colony. People worked in the 100-acre (40.4 ha) vineyard that was owned collectively under the name Ozark Colony Grape Club, and processed the grapes into juice and marmalade to sell. They also made hickory furniture and had a poultry club. Eaton, as president of the Ozark League Commission, also collaborated with neighboring tourist towns such as Eureka Springs to promote and market the home products and handicrafts made at the colony.

The colony had more than 40 cottages, a Grecian theater with classical recitals and costumed performers, a lodge with a dance floor and disco ball, manmade lakes stocked with trout for fishing, tennis courts, and a swimming pool. Seasonally, they had artist exhibits, art classes with visiting directors from the Kansas City Art Institute, music classes, and plays.

Artist, cabinet-maker, and resident Jim Sease made a totem pole (which were fashionable in tourist and resort areas at the time), telling the community's history, from a generalized nod to native Americans, to the four springs for which Sulphur Springs is named, then the railroad and airplanes, and a modern city with resort hotels and John Brown University. (Note: Totem poles historically are part of the culture of Native Americans in the Pacific Northwest of the United States. The Native Americans who lived closest to the Ozark Colony area were of the Osage Nation. The artistic one erected at Ozark Colony reportedly was topped by a depiction of an idealized leader of the Conestoga people, who were Algonquian-speaking people who historically lived in present-day Pennsylvania and Maryland, and also depicted a wigwam, which again are found in the Northeastern United States. This type of romanticized view of Native Americans and cultural appropriation of totem poles and other symbols were a popular way to signal that an area was attuned to nature and offered outdoor recreation and adventure.)

Painter John Eliot Jenkins kept a studio in the colony. His paintings are now in state capitols and libraries in Kansas, Missouri, Oklahoma, Texas, and Virginia, and his Snow in the Ozarks (1925) oil on canvas painting is part of the Foundation Collection at the Arkansas Museum of Fine Arts in Little Rock, Arkansas.

== Demographics ==
Historical population
Census	Pop.	Note	%±
1900	315		—
1910	500		58.7%
1920	470		−6.0%
1930	404		−14.0%
1940	435		7.7%
1950	543		24.8%
1960	460		−15.3%
1970	503		9.3%
1980	496		−1.4%
1990	523		5.4%
2000	671		28.3%
2010	511		−23.8%
2020	481		−5.9%
2025 (est.)	483		0.4%
U.S. Decennial Census

At the 2020 census, 481 people lived in Sulphur Springs. There were 193 households. The median age was 34.5 years old.

Income and poverty: Median income was $36.691; 17.2% experiencing poverty.

Education: 47% high school or equivalent degree; 11% some college, no degree; 4.6% Associates degree; 10.4% Bachelor's degree; 3.7% Graduate or professional degree.

Employment: 70.2% employees of private companies; 19.5% local, state, and federal workers; 10.2% self-employed.

Average travel time to work: 24.3 minutes; 65.9% drive alone to work; 27.3% carpool to work; 6.3% work from home.

Health: 28.6% without health care coverage; 21.5% have one or more disabilities.

Living arrangements: 46.1% married couple household; 29% male householder with no spouse present; 17.1% female householder with no spouse present.

Race and ethnicity: 390 people white alone; 68 two or more races; 55 some other race than the options given; 16 Hispanic or Latino of any race; 7 Native Hawaiian or Pacific Islander; 5 American Indian and Alaska native alone; 4 Black alone; 2 Asian alone.

== Education ==
Sulphur Springs is in the Gravette School District, which operates Gravette High School.

== Places of interest ==
- Old Spanish Treasure Cave
- Sulphur Springs Park Reserve

== Notable people ==
- Jim Hendren (born 1963), businessman from Sulphur Springs; represents District 2 in the Arkansas Senate, former member of the Arkansas House of Representatives

== See also ==
- List of municipalities in Arkansas
