= Coats School =

- U.S. National Register of Historic Places
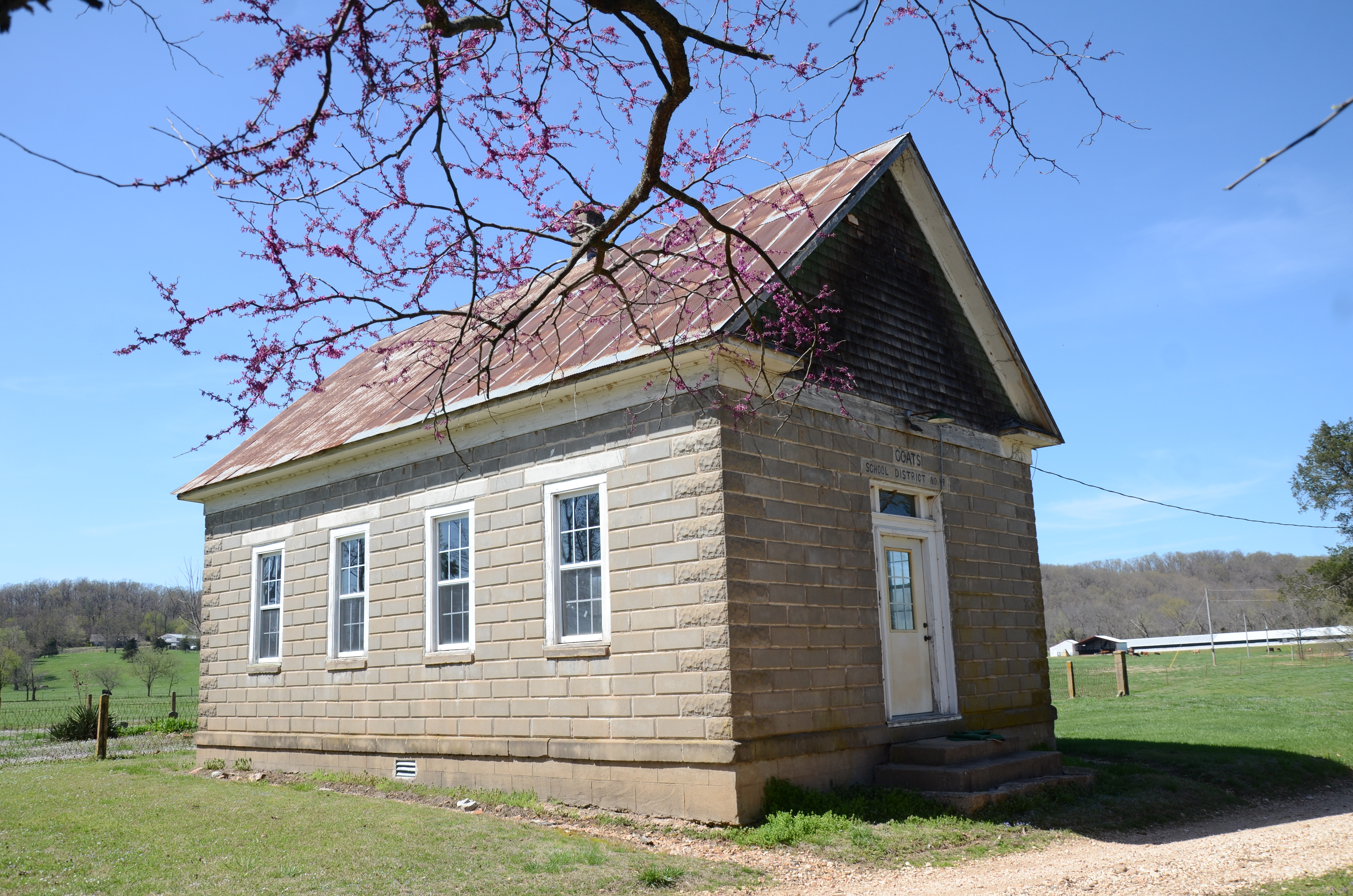

- Location within Arkansas Location within the United States
- Nearest city: Maysville, Arkansas
- Coordinates: 36°21′8″N 94°34′4″W
- Area: less than one acre
- Built: 1905
- MPS: Benton County MRA
- NRHP reference No.: 87002370
- Added to NRHP: January 28, 1988

The Coats School is a historic one-room schoolhouse in rural Benton County, Arkansas. It is located near the end of Coats Road (County Road 391), near Spavinaw Creek, south of Maysville. It is built of ashlar cut stone, with rusticated stone at the corners. It has a gable roof of tin, with a central chimney. Built c. 1905, it is a rare example of high-quality stone work in a vernacular building of modest proportions.

The building was listed on the National Register of Historic Places in 1988.

== See also ==
- National Register of Historic Places listings in Benton County, Arkansas
