= Timothy Chad Hutchinson =

American politician

Member of the Arkansas House of Representatives from the 95th district
- In office January 2005 – January 2011
- Preceded by: Cecile Bledsoe
- Succeeded by: Duncan Baird

Personal details
- Born: March 4, 1974 (age 52) Kansas City, Kansas
- Party: Republican
- Spouse: Julie Dianne Williams Hutchinson
- Relations: Tim Hutchinson (father); Donna Hutchinson (mother); Asa Hutchinson (uncle); Kim Hendren (uncle-by-marriage); Jeremy Y. Hutchinson (twin brother); Jim Hendren (cousin)
- Education: Harding University; University of Arkansas Law School
- Occupation: Attorney

Timothy Chad Hutchinson (born March 4, 1974) is an attorney in Fayetteville, Arkansas, who is a Republican former member of the Arkansas House of Representatives for District 95 in Benton County. He was initially elected in 2004, two years after his father, Tim Hutchinson, lost reelection to Democrat Mark Pryor to a second term in the United States Senate.

== Background ==
Born in Kansas City, Kansas, Hutchinson is a 1996 graduate of the Church of Christ-affiliated Harding University in Searcy, Arkansas. In 1999, he received his juris doctor degree from the University of Arkansas School of Law in Fayetteville. Before he entered the legislature, Hutchinson had been a deputy prosecutor in Benton and Sebastian counties. He is now a partner in Reece Moore Pendergraft in Fayetteville and practices in the fields of commercial litigation, employment law, administrative law, and real estate litigation. He is a former adjunct professor at John Brown University of Siloam Springs, Arkansas, having instructed employment law, business law, and corporate governance. Former Governor Mike Huckabee named Hutchinson to the Arkansas State Drug and Alcohol Prevention Advisory Board.

== Political career ==
In his first election to the House in 2004, Hutchinson defeated the Democrat Robbyn Tumey. In his initial term from 2005 to 2006, he served along with his twin brother, Jeremy Hutchinson, who represented District 31 in Pulaski County and was later elected in 2010 to the District 22 seat in the Arkansas State Senate, which he held until his resignation in 2018. From 2007 to 2010, Timothy Chad Hutchinson served alongside his mother, Donna Hutchinson, the first wife of former Senator Tim Hutchinson. A representative from Benton County first elected in 2006, Donna Hutchinson was term-limited from her position in 2012.

On October 31, 1996, the week before his father was elected to the U.S. Senate, the then 22-year-old Hutchinson was involved in an automobile accident near Fayetteville, Arkansas in which a couple in their sixties, Jack Clinton Watlington and Reba Beavers Watlington from Center, Texas, en route to a funeral, were killed. Hutchinson's passenger, state senator Fay Boozman, was gravely injured. Hutchinson's car crossed the center line during a storm and struck the Watlington car, then a tractor-trailer hit both cars. Hutchinson pleaded no contest to driving left of the center line and operating a vehicle with worn tires. Hutchinson paid a $50 fine and $100 in court costs for his role in the accident.

His uncle by marriage is Kim Hendren, a veteran former state senator from Gravette in Benton County. Hendren lost the U.S. Senate Republican primary in 2010 but was a successful candidate in 2014 for the District 92 seat in the Arkansas House.
