= David Haak =

American politician

Member of the Arkansas House of Representatives from the 1st district
- In office January 13, 2003 – January 10, 2005
- Preceded by: Kim Hendren
- Succeeded by: Steve Harrelson

Member of the Arkansas House of Representatives from the 21st district
- In office January 11, 1999 – January 13, 2003
- Preceded by: Dennis Young
- Succeeded by: Scott Sullivan

Personal details
- Born: May 9, 1949 (age 77) Texarkana, Arkansas
- Party: Republican

David Haak (born May 9, 1949) is an American politician who served in the Arkansas House of Representatives from 1999 to 2005.
