= Order of the Occult Hand =

Whimsical secret society of journalists

The Order of the Occult Hand is a secret society of American journalists who slip the meaningless and telltale phrase "It was as if some occult hand had…" in print as an inside joke.

== History ==
The phrase was introduced by Joseph Flanders, then a police reporter of The Charlotte News, in the summer of 1965, when he reported on a millworker named Freddie Lee Harr, who was shot by his uncle when he unexpectedly returned home in the middle of the night after a bomb-threat interrupted his night-shift work. He wrote:

It was as if some occult hand had moved pawn after pawn until they were in the right place and then—tragedy.

Amused by this purple passage, in a local bar, his colleagues decided to commemorate Flanders's achievement by forming the Order of the Occult Hand. They even showed Flanders a banner made of a bed sheet depicting a bloody hand reaching out of a purple cloud. Among the original members were: R. C. Smith, an associate editor; Stewart Spencer, then an editorial writer; John Gin, the city editor; and several others, who vowed to get the words into print as soon as possible. The editors were not happy about this mischief at all and ordered copy editors to be extremely vigilant, yet the phrase kept slipping into the paper and was even smuggled into Down Beat, a jazz magazine, by Smith. The News revealed this tradition of high spirits, how it started, in 1985, when it went out of circulation.

Alternatively, Paul Greenberg, the Pulitzer Prize–winning editorial page editor of the Arkansas Democrat-Gazette, claimed that Reese Cleghorn, then an editorial writer of The Charlotte Observer, was the one who originated the Order. Cleghorn denied this claim. The Boston Globe once reported that the Occult Hand Club was a replacement for the Defective Busbar Club, which was open to any journalist who used the word, such as in "the cause of the fire was attributed to a defective busbar, officials said."

The occult-hand phrase did not stop in the Charlotte News and Observer, but has crept onto other media. The use of the phrase has spread to newspaper media around the world like "a cough in a classroom" and "a pox". The Order was occasionally endangered by reckless and artless users of the phrase, but it retained overall secrecy until 2004, when James Janega of the Chicago Tribune published a thorough investigation about the Order. Upon exposure to the public, Greenberg made a full confession.

In 2006, Greenberg announced that the Order had chosen a new secret phrase at an annual editorial writers' convention and resumed a stealth operation.

== Members ==
The New York Times in 1974 by Paul Hofmann and in 1998 by Tim Race

- Paul Hofmann (18 September 1974). "UN Gen Assembly 29th session opens on Sept 17. Algerian Foreign Min Abdelaziz". The New York Times (Abstracts).
  "Wonders if Cyprus events might have been 'organized by some occult hand' as part of W Eur global strategy."
- Tim Race (26 February 1998). "INCOMING; Well Versed in E-Mail Subject Lines". The New York Times.
  "Even worse, with some E-mail systems, if the writer doesn't fill in the subject line, the occult hand of artificial intelligence will enter No Subject."

The Los Angeles Times–Washington Post News Service in 1976 and 1984 by unknown

- "'Fer Shur, fer shur,' CB airwaves become a jungle". Los Angeles Times – Washington Post News Service. February 25, 1976.
  "...the patrol car appeared behind him as if deposited there by an occult hand."
- "NBC Chief Tinker finds it a slow trip to programming high road". Los Angeles Times – Washington Post News Service. January 9, 1984.
  " 'Now let's say we do that in time, if through some occult hand that occurs...' " [putatively a quote from Grant Tinker]

The Los Angeles Times from 1983 to 2019 by Deborah Caulfield, Jay Sharbutt, Dennis McDougal, Charles Champlin, Nancy Wride, Stephen Braun and Ben Welsh

- Deborah Caulfield (7 November 1983). "Disney pulls 'Wolf' from Mann in Dispute". Los Angeles Times.
  "It was as if an occult hand had somehow palmed the film."
- Caulfield, Deborah (7 March 1985), "Mancuso: Cat On A Hot Film Roll", Los Angeles Times
  "It was as if an occult hand had passed over Nick Mancuso's face, momentarily transforming him into Tennessee Williams."
- Jay Sharbutt (25 March 1985). "Oscars: the long and short of it". Los Angeles Times.
  "...one might say it was as if an occult hand had hurled a raspberry at Hollywood."
- Dennis McDougal (11 October 1985). "The public radio wars: Can NPR and APR coexist?". Los Angeles Times.
  "He said it is as if an occult hand had arbitrarily determined which..."
- Deborah Caulfield (30 March 1987). "Spirit Awards: Year of film independents". Los Angeles Times.
  "...Saturday, it was as if an occult hand had passed over the Academy Awards..."
- Charles Champlin (12 September 1989). "Bran Ferren: Master of Arts and Sciences". Los Angeles Times.
  "Then it was as if an occult hand had made a mystical sign..."
- Nancy Wride (10 April 1994). "Bound to the Ring of Saturn Owners". Los Angeles Times.
  "...I found myself seemingly driven by an occult hand into the arms of the Saturn..."
- Stephen Braun; et al. (31 January 1999). "Sunday report: Pathway to peril / How Clinton and his adversaries endangered his presidency; Chapter VII; The Flexing of Muscles and a Concern for History; The process that has engulfed Clinton and both houses of Congress is all about power. At the heart of the crisis lie legal and moral questions about abuse of that power". Los Angeles Times.
  "It was as if an occult hand had substituted an alternate universe for..."
- Ben Welsh (14 September 2019). "The Weather". Los Angeles Times.
  "Then, as if an occult hand moved a pawn upon some giant chessboard, a strong upper-level trough will approach Northern California."

The Boston Globe from 1987 to 2000 by John Powers, M. R. Montgomery, Paul Hirshson, David Mehegan

- Powers, John; Globe Staff (25 January 1987), "Since backfiring, Landeta's been a weapon", The Boston Globe, p. 70
  "Bears president Mike McCaskey swore that it was as if an occult hand (belonging to the shade of Bears founder George Halas) had reached out and tipped the ball."
- Montgomery, M. R.; Globe Staff (25 July 1989), "Splash beats crash on covers", The Boston Globe, p. 55
  "In Newsweek, it is as if Sabrina were saved by an occult hand, as she 'turned up safe and sound.'"
- Paul Hirshson (28 October 1989). "Some came running". The Boston Globe.
  "It's dark and scary, and has all kinds of spooky stuff in it, including a moving occult hand that actually -- well, we don't want to spoil the surprise."
- David Mehegan (25 November 1990). "Recession? What recession? Despite the downturn, several merchants reckon they can strike gold with new outlets". The Boston Globe.
  "Inside, the lights go down and a sultry voice describes the audio systems, while some occult hand activates each component in turn."
- Montgomery, M. R.; Globe Staff (6 July 1995), "A place for everything . . .", The Boston Globe, p. 71
  "Nails, screws, small tools and thingamajigs accumulate and then relocate as if moved by an occult hand to some new hiding spot."
- M. R. Montgomery (18 March 1997). "The snubbing of professor Ricks As he savors raves for his T.S. Eliot book, he finds himself odd man out on BU English staff". The Boston Globe.
  "If a president of Harvard ever intervenes in something like a promotion or a course outline, it is well disguised, the work of an occult hand."
- Montgomery, M. R.; Globe Staff (27 November 1998), "Gardner Blue Room's new shades of luxe", The Boston Globe, p. D9
  "Just as the Gardner was negotiating with Humphries, the British weaving firm, a complete bit of that pattern, with the repeats, was revealed almost as if by an occult hand in Hokam Hall, home of Lord Leicester, in Wells-next-the-Sea, England."
- David Mehegan (14 May 2000). "The story of E behind one letter's swift ascent to the top of the alphabetic heap". The Boston Globe.
  "We like to think we have earned success, after all, and discount the occult hand of fate."
- Billy Baker (30 October 2014). "WITCHY BUSINESS; Christian Day conjures up critics by straddling the worlds of witchcraft and commerce in Salem". The Boston Globe.
  "he had a spectacular crash on his Segway when one of the wheels magically flew off, as if an occult hand had reached down from above and removed it. Or he hit a curb too fast

The Associated Press from 1978 to 2006 by Jay Sharbutt, Scott Williams, Eric Fidler, John Skoyles, and Joann Loviglio

- Jay Sharbutt (October 6, 1978). "Premiere of CBS 'Flying High' a dull, tasteless, low-level bomb". The Associated Press.
- Jay Sharbutt (26 September 1991). "FBI's Untold Stories Told, James Earl Jones Seeks A Few Laughs". The Associated Press.
  "As the show wears on, your eyelids may slam shut, as if tugged by an occult hand.
- Scott Williams (26 January 1996). "Bruce Greenwood and the Picture that Put 'Nowhere Man' on the Run". The Associated Press.
  "Veil became the pawn of a conspiracy so vast it's as if an occult hand had plucked him out of our reality and dropped him into a private nightmare."
- Fidler, Eric (23 March 1998), "Sound Bites: Audio Reviews: "Pilgrim" (Reprise) - Eric Clapton", Associated Press Newswires
  "When he plays the blues, it is as if some occult hand is guiding his hand over the guitar, channeling the essence of the blues through Clapton."
- John Skoyles (21 April 2003). "The 'hermit' emerges in Calvino's writings". The Associated Press.
  "It is as if an occult hand placed Calvino in our country so we could appreciate our own eccentricities."
- Joann Loviglio (26 June 2006). "Douglas Preston and Lincoln Child collaboration continues with new novel". The Associated Press.
  "After venturing through museum catacombs and rooms that held everything from whale eyeballs to flesh-eating beetles feasting on animal carcasses, it was as if an occult hand led them to the hall of Cretaceous dinosaurs.

The Arkansas Democrat-Gazette from 1993 to 2004 by Paul Greenberg and Kane Webb

- Greenberg, Paul (28 May 1993), "Warren G. Clinton's Bad Week", Tulsa World, p. A12
  "It was as if an occult hand was at work, or maybe a screenwriter for one of Mel Brooks' slapstick comedies."
- Paul Greenberg (28 September 1994). "The anarchists' convention". The Arkansas Democrat-Gazette.
  "It's as if an occult hand had reached into newspaper offices across the country and assembled a whole menagerie of opinionators, from the ring-tailed roarers to the loyal meeks."
- Paul Greenberg (13 February 2000). "Hillary: The latest production". The Arkansas Democrat-Gazette.
  "Then there's the care Hillary Clinton, Esq. took with those disappearing billing records, which had the strangest way of appearing years later in the White House--as if an occult hand were moving them about."
- Paul Greenberg (3 October 2001). "COLUMNISTS: Advice from the past For a still new president". The Arkansas Democrat-Gazette.
  "As if by an occult hand, the following correspondence was delivered to the White House mail room yesterday:"
- "EDITORIALS : Harry Potter goes free A federal case for muggles". The Arkansas Democrat-Gazette. 28 April 2003.
  "And now, as if by an occult hand, Harry himself has been freed."
- Paul Greenberg (16 June 2004). "No harm, no foul". The Arkansas Democrat-Gazette.
  "The Dan Ryan and Eisenhower Expressways would be overrun with stalled vehicles, as if an occult hand had just emptied the Loop.
- Kane Webb (20 June 2004). "COLUMNISTS One helluva trailer". The Arkansas Democrat-Gazette.
  "As if by an occult hand, they appear-mama, papa, and baby."

The Washington Times from 1996 to 1998 by Rex Bowman, Sean Scully, Ronald J. Hansen, and Jim Keary

- Bowman, Rex (7 November 1996), "The winner is ... or is it? Miscount makes pair sweat it out", The Washington Times, p. C5
  "And on Tuesday, as if an occult hand were meting out justice to the senator, Mark Warner seemed poised to make the same comeback."
- Scully, Sean (7 November 1997), "Barry vs. Plotkin", The Washington Times, p. C8
  "It was as if an occult hand had reached down to throw beleaguered Democrat Donald S. Beyer Jr. a wee crumb on an otherwise bleak night."
- Ronald J. Hansen (20 February 1998). "Meter running out on free parking in the District Contractor installs first new machines". The Washington Times.
  "It was as if an occult hand had delivered a cold slap of reality to the efforts of D.C. Chief Management Officer Camille Cates Barnett, who hopes to make the parking system work again."
- Keary, Jim (2 April 1998), "Cops corner shotgun-toting man on his way to register with police", The Washington Times, p. C5
  "But even with that explanation, it was as if an occult hand swept him away - into handcuffs and into the back seat of a police cruiser."

Stars and Stripes March 28, 2002 by David Allen

- David Allen (28 March 2002), Rain-hungry Okinawa may face water rationing if dry weather continues :"It was if an occult hand swept rain clouds Okinawa's way."

The Virginian-Pilot in 1997 by Larry Maddry

- Larry Maddry (19 March 1997). "Amazing new fabric fits notoriously messy eater".
  "The fact is a food item which seems inert in a glass container - cocktail sauce for shrimp is a good example - has been known to sail as far as 15 feet to where I stand and hit the sleeve of my coat as though tossed by an occult hand."

The Washington Post in 1997 by Linton Weeks

- Weeks, Linton (5 June 1997), "Spares and Strikes", The Washington Post, p. C05
  "It was as if an occult hand had guided the black sphere down the narrow lane and into the triangle of pins."

The Post-Standard in 2000 by an anonymous author

- "Look out for another emu roaming Oswego county". The (Syracuse) Post-Standard. 12 October 2000.
  "As if moved by an occult hand, phantom emus keep popping up in Oswego County."

Star-Tribune in 2001 and 2002 by Eric Hanson and Kristin Tillotson

- Hanson, Eric (15 July 2001), "These books rock 'Fargo Rock City' lauds metal as refuge for teens", Star Tribune, p. 15F
  "It was as if an occult hand had taken Chuck Klosterman's radio, tuned away from the Top 40 ear candy of Duran Duran and the Stray Cats, and tuned into the satanic debauchery of Motley Crue."
- Kristin Tillotson (3 February 2002). "Women who get too much; Is "Sex and the City" bashed because it's a bad show, or because its characters behave badly?". Star Tribune.
  "It was as if an occult hand had reached down and given the nation's television critics a pinch on the tush."

The Bangkok Post from 2002 to 2007 by Wanda Sloan

- "HOME REVIEW - CAT ready to do the amazing digital divide". The Bangkok Post. 27 February 2002.
  "Mr Charoen said he never interfered in such a minor business venture, but it was as if an occult hand had touched the plaza and every vendor suddenly promised to sell only legal software, movies and music."
- Wanda Sloan (25 February 2004). "THE SLOAN RANGER; The battle to keep updated". The Bangkok Post.
  "A curious and concerned reader named Joe clicked on "Tools" and then "Windows Update" and found himself transported as if by an occult hand to WindowsUpdate.Microsoft.com—where he was confronted by a staggering 22 update packages for Windows XP and a staggering lack of instructions on what to do about it."
- "HOME REVIEW; Plaza to get high-tech dust-off". The Bangkok Post. 11 August 2004.
  "Greenpeace campaigner Patwajee Sri-suwan denied removing anything from the centre; by incredible coincidence, as if by an occult hand, Greenpeace found a papaya tree 60km from the research site, no idea how it got there."
- "HOME REVIEW; TOT Corp shows a lust for loot". The Bangkok Post. 18 August 2008.
  "Finally, as if by an occult hand, there it was out on the table, your TOT Corp coming clean;"
- "HOME REVIEW; A head rolls at TOT". The Bangkok Post. 4 July 2007.
  "it was almost as if some occult hand had guided the convenient contract issuance."

Others

- Barrington, Hermester; Maraetoa, Fayaway (19 February 2026), "The Report of a Newly Discovered Freshwater Ciliate: Paramecium prometheum n.sp. (Ciliophora, Parameciidae)" (PDF), Journal of Agriculture and Life Sciences
  "This research suggests that dormant genes for acidophilia were once again switched on, as if by an occult hand, through exposure to an environment which became increasingly hostile to the ancestral stock, but to which the novel species, hitherto unknown because its environment no longer occurs or never occurred in nature, slowly adapted as the ratio of water to other substances decreased via evaporation."
- Flanders, Patrick (10 September 2018), "Privilege Escalation and a Proposal for Acceptable Exclusion", Lacework Blog
  "Privilege escalation acts as if an occult hand had reached down and simply placed an unwarranted person in the midst of juicy storehouses of data."
- Hongoltz-Hetling, Matt (28 August 2016), "Irene's Impact Still Felt Five Years Later", Valley News
  "looked like an occult hand had reached down and scrambled the lives of the park’s residents into a sodden and mud-coated shambles."
- Eglowstein, Howard (1 January 1990), "Dying Data", BYTE, vol. 15, no. 1, p. 42
  "It's as if an occult hand had reached out and intentionally destroyed your data."
- Rogers, Dennis (3 August 1993), "Snug fat clothes and other realities of pre-boomers", The News & Observer, p. B2
  "One morning last week, while pondering the daily question of khakis vs. jeans, it was as if an occult hand reached down and plucked the baggy green pants from the hanger and thrust them at me."
- Shinkle, Florence (14 February 1994), "Fated attractions: How our minds (and our glands) make us fall in love", St. Louis Post-Dispatch, p. 1E
  "It was as if an occult hand had pointed you out to each other."
- Crawford, Hal (27 January 1998), "Addiction To Gaming Still A Sordid Secret For Many", The West Australian, p. 10
  "As if an occult hand had slipped over his shoulder to assist, the little plastic shelf slides back into the machine and begins to whirr."
- Zachmeier, Aaron (28 June 2002), "Lake St. John Flotilla", The Natchez Democrat
  "It’s as though an occult hand has dug a channel to the Mississippi River, allowing its raucous current to flow through the lake once again after centuries of separation."
- Sparber, Max (11 January 2012), "Should I stay or should I go?: The question that plagues Minnesota artists", MinnPost
  "It is as if some occult hand were at work, discouraging the arts market."
- Marmorstein, Donna (6 January 2013), "Soliloquy: What's That Buzzing Sound", Aberdeen American News
  "As if an occult hand moved her to action, she discovered the intercom worked both ways."
- Tepper, Miles (15 February 2013), "Surviving the Hipster Era", The Niskayuna Warrior
  "It was as if an occult hand reached down from the heavens and said, 'Let there be skinny jeans.'"
- Morgan, Thomas (14 June 2013), "2 guys in R.I. growing fungi for profit", Providence Journal
  "DiPietro picked up a small instrument that monitored the CO2 level. “Getting up there,” he noted. A few minutes later, as if by the wave of an occult hand, an alarm rang."
- Purdy, Chase (29 June 2013), "Roanoke Co. Democrats in turmoil", The Roanoke Times, p. A1
  "In Evans' recounting, it was as if an occult hand had swept him aside, replacing him with new leadership, in which Lang had been tapped to call the shots."
- Gonzalez, Tony (20 October 2013), "Offbeat appeal helps drive Lane Motor Museum", The Tennessean
  "But as Lane began to apologize, the engine kicked in with a puff, as if an occult hand had turned the crank, and the crowd cheered."
- Murrieta, Ed (24 December 2013), "Performance at The Kitchen worth price of admission", The Sacramento Business Journal
  "Servers work the room gracefully. Empty plates are removed and empty glasses are refilled as if by an occult hand; certainly beyond my notice and I tend to notice such things."
- Ward, Terence (January 14, 2016). "Communication Breakdown In Rochester: Systems Go Down While Town Addresses Snow Protocols". Shawangunk Journal. Vol. IX, no. 2. Electric Valley Media, LLC. p. 6. "Perhaps it was because Mercury is in retrograde, but it was as if an occult hand had scrambled all the communication in Rochester town offices on the very day that official business was to begin for the year."
- Weiss, Herb (January 8, 2018). "Time to Hang Up on Phone Scammers for Good". Pawtucket Times. RISN Operations Inc. p. A,3. "Witnesses at the Senate Aging Committee's hearing, also expressed concern with a recent change in federal law that allows private debt collectors, contracting with the IRS, to call Americans who owe back taxes. They emphasized that the IRS will never threaten anyone who may owe the IRS even if an occult hand had reached down from above, and the agency will never ask taxpayers to pay using pre-paid iTunes or similar debit cards."
- Ellison, Garret (19 September 2019). "Why won't Wolverine engage with EPA-formed citizen group?". The Grand Rapids Press
  "Wolverine’s absence hung over the gathering like an occult hand; simultaneously central to the matter, yet apart and of concern to the citizen board."
- Walsh, Philip W. (27 April 2019) "'Unleafing Himself in a Sea of Cabbages': Landscape and the Politics of Self-relinquishment in the Work of Gloria E. Anzaldúa".
  "As the US wilderness was pushed further and further west as if by an occult hand, and the US economy industrialized, eastern cities became importers rather than producers of natural resources."

The Seattle Times in 2016 by Jennifer McDermott from The Associated Press

- Jennifer McDermott (15 March 2016). "Fans use Lovecraft's fame to promote Providence's weird side". The Seattle Times.
  "Some devotees have even reported feeling icy fingers on their arms and wrists, as if an occult hand had grabbed them."
- Trichur, Rita (Feb. 13, 2020). "Blame Ottawa for OSFI’s U-turn on mortgage stress tests" The Globe and Mail.
  "It was as if an occult hand had prompted the regulator to contradict itself."
- Lanning, Courtney (Aug. 3, 2019). "EDITORIAL: Might have to rethink phrase, 'Dead as Dillinger'" The Arkansas Democrat-Gazette.
  "It was as if an occult hand had shaped that year to see these criminals dead."
- Nark, Jason (Oct. 29, 2019). Is the world’s biggest Ouija board in Western Pa. or Massachusetts? Yes. No. Goodbye. The Philadelphia Inquirer.
  "began painting as if an occult hand was guiding their inner planchette"

The Waupaca County Post in 2024 by James Card

- Card, James (February 8, 2024). "What happened to winter? Warm weather affects events." The Waupaca County Post, page 3.
  "'The snow-melting temperatures during the Feb. 3-4 weekend created an eerie and long-lingering mid-day fog as if some occult hand had moved Mother Nature's thermostat."
