= Paul Greenberg (journalist) =

American journalist (1937–2021)

- Born: January 21, 1937
- Died: April 6, 2021 (aged 84)
- Occupations: Journalist, author
- Employer: Arkansas Democrat-Gazette
- Children: Dan Greenberg

Paul Greenberg (January 21, 1937 – April 6, 2021) was an American syndicated columnist and author. He served as the editorial page editor of the Arkansas Democrat-Gazette. His articles appeared in various newspapers through Tribune Content Agency's syndicate. He won the 1969 Pulitzer Prize for Editorial Writing in recognition of his 1968 work for the Pine Bluff Commercial (Pine Bluff, Arkansas). Greenberg also was a Pulitzer finalist in 1978 and 1986, and served as a Pulitzer juror in 1984 and 1985.

On September 27, 1980, then-Governor Bill Clinton addressed the Arkansas Democratic Convention and cast himself as a standard-bearer of the postwar tradition of progressive governance in the state. In response, Greenberg began calling Clinton "Slick Willie" and alleged he was a false reformer who abandoned the policies of such predecessors as Winthrop Rockefeller, Dale Bumpers and David Pryor. Greenberg may have not, however, been the first to use the term in reference to Clinton. According to Meredith L. Oakley, the term was coined by Jess L. Crosser who often berated the young governor in letters to the editor of the Arkansas Democrat. According to Greenberg, actually popularized by the newspaper's managing editor, John R. Starr. The moniker "Slick Willie" would go on to be frequently used by Clinton's opposition throughout his political career.

He was the father of journalist Dan Greenberg.

== Books ==
External videos
- Booknotes interview with Greenberg on No Surprises, July 7, 1996, C-SPAN

- No Surprises: Two Decades of Clinton-Watching. Brassey's Inc. April 1996. ISBN 978-1-57488-005-2.
- Entirely Personal. University Press of Mississippi. April 1992. ISBN 978-0-87805-551-7.
- Resonant Lives: Fifty Figures of Consequence. University Press of America. May 7, 1991. ISBN 978-0-89633-153-2.

== See also ==
- Order of the Occult Hand
