= Donna Hutchinson =

American politician

Donna Jean King Hutchinson

Member of the Arkansas House of Representatives from the 98th district
- In office January 2007 – January 2013
- Succeeded by: John Burris (reconfigured district)

Personal details
- Born: Donna Jean King; August 23, 1949 (age 77) New Bern, North Carolina, U.S.
- Party: Republican
- Spouse: Tim Hutchinson (m. 1970; div. 1999)
- Relations: Asa Hutchinson (former brother-in-law); Jeremy Y. Hutchinson and Timothy Chad Hutchinson (twin sons); Joshua Luke Hutchinson (youngest son); Jim Hendren (former nephew by marriage); Kim Hendren (former in-law)
- Education: University of Arkansas at Fayetteville
- Occupation: Mediation counselor

Donna Jean King Hutchinson (born August 23, 1949) is a Republican former member of the Arkansas House of Representatives from District 98, which includes part of fast-growing Benton County in Northwest Arkansas. A resident of Bella Vista, she was initially elected to the House in 2006 and assumed her position in January 2007.

== Family background ==
A member of the Blackfeet Nation, Hutchinson was born into a ranching family in Montana. As a child, she lived in twenty-nine different locations. She holds a master's degree in education from the University of Arkansas in Fayetteville. Employed as a professional mediator by DJ Consulting, she is a non-denominational Christian.

Her son, Jeremy Hutchinson, is a former state representative who has served since 2011 in the Arkansas State Senate from a district in Little Rock. Timothy Chad Hutchinson, Jeremy's twin brother from Springdale, previously served with his mother in the state House. The twins were born in 1974 in Kansas City, Kansas. A third son, Joshua Luke Hutchinson (born 1978) resided in 2013 in Keller, near Fort Worth, Texas, and was formerly a resident of Rogers, Arkansas. Tim Hutchinson, Donna Hutchinson's former husband, from whom she was divorced in 1999 after twenty-nine years of marriage, served from 1997 to 2003 as the first Republican U.S. senator from Arkansas since 1879, two years after the close of Reconstruction. In 2000, a year after the divorce from Donna, Tim Hutchinson married in a private ceremony his former staffer and state director, Randi Fredholm, who is fourteen years his junior. She had left Hutchinson's employ in 1998 to attend law school. Hutchinson asked his sons not to attend the wedding out of respect for their mother. He called the collapse of his first marriage an "intensely personal thing."

In 2002, Tim Hutchinson was unseated by former Democratic state Attorney General Mark Pryor. Tim and Randi Hutchinson are employed by the Dickstein Shapiro firm, he as senior advisor and she as an attorney, and the couple resides in Alexandria, Virginia. As a congressional wife from 1993 to 1999, Donna Hutchinson had remained in Arkansas. Tim Hutchinson had filed for divorce on grounds that the couple had lived apart for more than eighteen months, the requirement for an uncontested divorce in Arkansas.

Her former brother-in-law, Asa Hutchinson, is a Republican former member of the United States House of Representatives for Arkansas's 3rd congressional district and former Administrator of the Drug Enforcement Administration. In 2014 he was elected as governor of Arkansas. Prior to his election to the U.S. Senate in 1996, Tim Hutchinson had preceded his brother as representative for the Third Congressional District.

== Political career ==
Representative Hutchinson served on the Arkansas House Education Committee and was the chairman of the Subcommittee on Vocational-Technical Institutions. She was assigned to the House State Agencies and Governmental Affairs Committee and the Joint Budget Committee. For a time, she chaired the Arkansas Legislative Women's Caucus.

Representative Hutchinson sponsored legislation designed to (1) protect children from registered sex offenders, (2) further define the criminal act of voyeurism, and (3) ascertain that the legislature receives information on highway funding prior to each regular session and each fiscal session. In 2012, Hutchinson ranked 89 percent on the Arkansas Freedom Scorecard, which measures the votes cast by legislators in regard to issues relating to economic freedom, educational reform, "good government," personal liberty, small government, and tax/budget policy. Only ten members of the House at that time ranked higher on the survey than did Hutchinson.

Hutchinson considered educational issues the most vital to Arkansas because 60 percent of the state budget is earmarked for schools and universities. In an interview with Progressive Arkansas, she explains her concerns:

We are ranked one of the highest states in students attending college, but the lowest in students graduating. Our education system shuffles students through the process without giving them an adequate education to be successful ... I am not advocating all students enter college, but they should be prepared for a job. We have a huge problem when 25 percent of our students entering college -- not just graduating from high school, but going on to college -- must be given remediation in reading! We have conducted interim studies for two years; we understand the problems and hope to have bills which will correct them. These will not be easy bills to pass. ... We have not been getting our money's worth. Education is about the students, not the adults running the system, but those adults will be determined to keep the status quo.

In 2010, Hutchinson sponsored legislation to ban K2, a synthetic drug often likened to marijuana. K-2 is placed on materials such as incense that are dried and smoked.

In her last election in 2010, Hutchinson defeated an Independent, candidate, Jim Parsons, by a wide margin. Ineligible to seek a fourth term in the House in 2012, she was succeeded in a reconfigured District 98 by fellow Republican John Burris of Harrison in Boone County, previously the representative from District 85.

== See also ==
- List of Native American politicians
- Native American women in politics
