= Maysville, Arkansas =

- Census-designated place
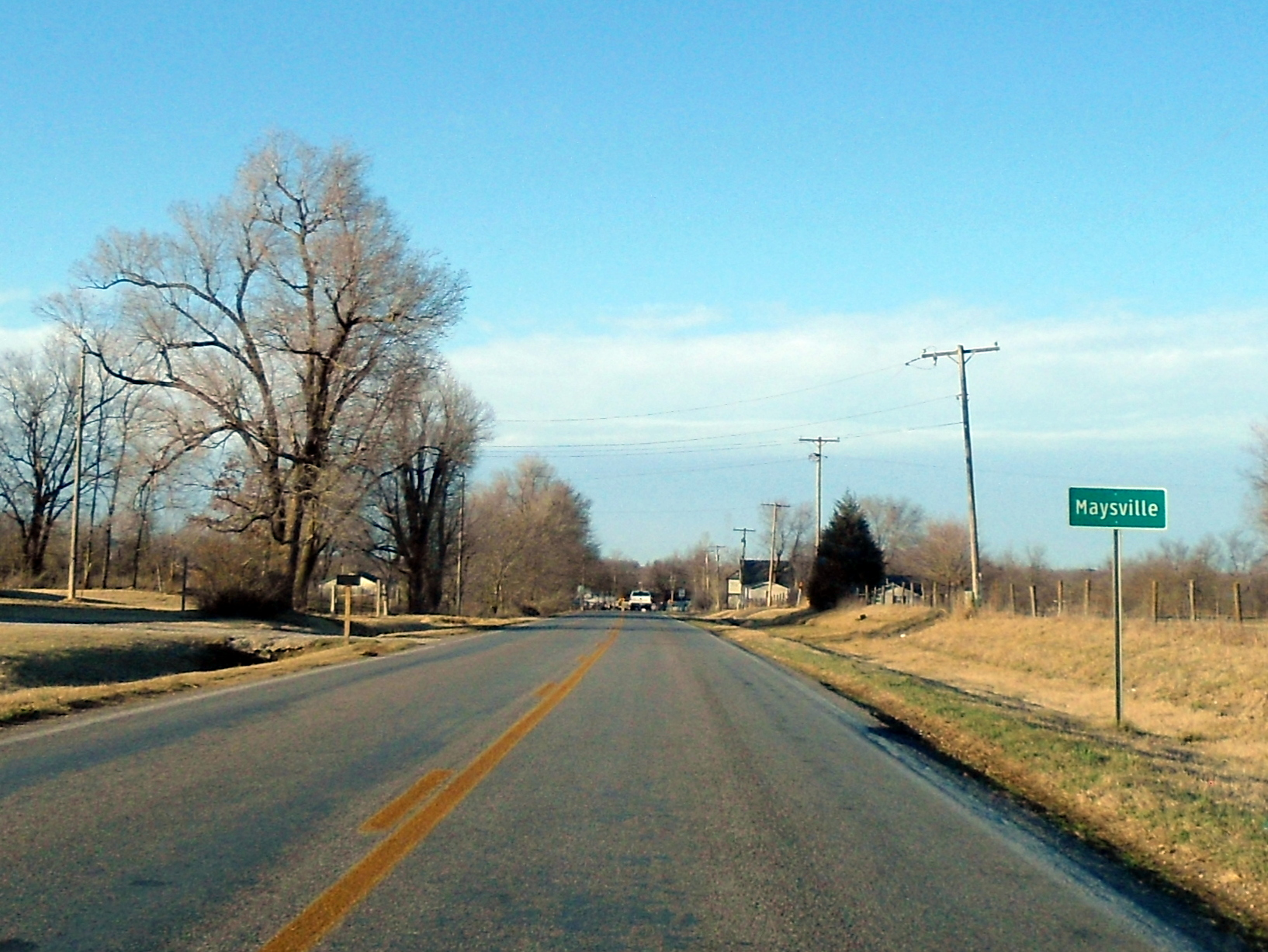
- Maysville southern limits, February 2013

- Location of Maysville in Benton County, Arkansas.

- Location within Arkansas
- Coordinates: 36°24′13″N 94°36′07″W
- Country: United States
- State: Arkansas
- County: Benton

Area
  - Total: 2.36 sq mi (6.10 km^{2})
  - Land: 2.36 sq mi (6.10 km^{2})
  - Water: 0 sq mi (0.00 km^{2})
- Elevation: 1,043 ft (318 m)

Population (2020)
  - Total: 117
  - Density: 49.7/sq mi (19.19/km^{2})
- Time zone: UTC-6 (Central (CST))
  - Summer (DST): UTC-5 (CDT)
- Area code: 479
- GNIS feature ID: 77622

Maysville is an unincorporated community and census-designated place (CDP) in Benton County, Arkansas, United States. It is the westernmost settlement in the state of Arkansas. Per the 2020 census, the population was 117. It is located in the Northwest Arkansas region.

== History ==
A post office has been in operation at Maysville since 1850. Maysville once rivaled Bentonville in size, according to local history.

Maysville is the location of (or is the nearest community to) Coats School, which is located on Spavinaw Creek Rd. and Sellers Farm, which is located on Old Hwy. on State Line. Both are listed on the National Register of Historic Places.

== Demographics ==
Historical population
Census	Pop.	Note	%±
2010	130		—
2020	117		−10.0%
U.S. Decennial Census; 2010 2020

=== 2020 census ===
Maysville CDP, Arkansas – Racial and ethnic composition Note: the US Census treats Hispanic/Latino as an ethnic category. This table excludes Latinos from the racial categories and assigns them to a separate category. Hispanics/Latinos may be of any race.
Race / Ethnicity (NH = Non-Hispanic)	Pop 2010	Pop 2020	% 2010	% 2020
White alone (NH)	107	91	82.31%	77.78%
Black or African American alone (NH)	0	0	0.00%	0.00%
Native American or Alaska Native alone (NH)	7	2	5.38%	1.71%
Asian alone (NH)	2	2	1.54%	1.71%
Pacific Islander alone (NH)	0	0	0.00%	0.00%
Some Other Race alone (NH)	0	0	0.00%	0.00%
Mixed Race or Multi-Racial (NH)	12	12	9.23%	10.26%
Hispanic or Latino (any race)	2	10	1.54%	8.55%
Total	130	117	100.00%	100.00%

== Education ==
It is in the Gravette School District, which operates Gravette High School.
