= Gravette High School =

Location
- 325 Lion Drive; Gravette, Arkansas 72734; United States; 36°15′38″N 94°29′39″W

Information
- School type: Public comprehensive
- Status: Open
- School district: Gravette School District
- CEEB code: 040930
- NCES School ID: 050684000414
- Teaching staff: 70.33 (on FTE basis)
- Grades: 9–12
- Enrollment: 625 (2023-2024)
- Student to teacher ratio: 8.89
- Education system: ADE Smart Core
- Classes offered: Regular, Advanced Placement (AP)
- Colors: Black and orange
- Athletics conference: 4A Region 1
- Team name: Gravette Lions
- Accreditation: ADE; AdvancED (1993–)
- Feeder schools: Gravette Middle School (6–8)
- Website: www.gravetteschools.net/o/ghs

Gravette High School is a comprehensive public high school located in the fringe town of Gravette, Arkansas, United States. The school provides secondary education for students in grades 9 through 12. It is one of nine public high schools in Benton County, Arkansas and the sole high school administered by the Gravette School District.

The district, and therefore Gravette High's attendance boundary, includes the majority of Gravette, as well as all of Maysville and Sulphur Springs, and a section of Bella Vista.

== Academics ==
Gravette High School is accredited by the Arkansas Department of Education (ADE) and has been accredited by AdvancED since 1983. The assumed course of study follows the Smart Core curriculum developed by the ADE, which requires students complete at least 22 units prior to graduation. Students complete regular coursework and exams and may take Advanced Placement (AP) courses and exams with the opportunity to receive college credit.

== Athletics ==
The Gravette High School mascot and athletic emblem is the lion with black and orange serving as the school colors.

The Gravette Lions compete in interscholastic activities within the 4A Classification via the 4A Region 1 Conference, as administered by the Arkansas Activities Association. The Lions field teams in football, golf (boys/girls), basketball (boys/girls), baseball, softball, track and field (boys/girls), cross country, cheer and Wrestling (boys/girls).

The Lions' Rivals are: Gentry High School Pioneers
