= Lloyd Andrews (actor) =

American actor, singer and composer (1906–1992)

Lloyd Andrews (December 8, 1906 – April 3, 1992) was an American actor, singer and composer known as Arkansas Slim. Born in Gravette, Arkansas, Andrews grew up on Spavinaw Creek in rural Benton County. He married Lucille Kinsey of Pineville, Missouri in 1929. They had a son Joseph, who also worked as an actor.

== Career ==
Andrews was 6 feet 8 inches (2 m) tall and received the nickname Slim. He used money earned picking strawberries to buy a Model T Ford, and began doing comedy. He joined forces with a traveling showman known as Watso the Musical Wizard, who taught him handsaw and banjo.

Tex Ritter encountered Andrews doing a standup comedy routine in a tent in Monticello, Arkansas. Ritter invited Andrews to work in movies with him. Andrews went on to perform in 15 films with Ritter. Although he acted as a movie cowboy, he had a hatred for horses, which is why he chose to ride a mule in many movies.

When western B-movies began to lose popularity, Andrews toured with Bob Wills, singing and composing songs before he found a new career as a host of weekday children's TV, starting in the early 50s as "The 49er" for KGEO-TV and KMJ-TV in Fresno, California, and then hosting "The Fun Club" at KOAM in Kansas.

Andrews and his wife Lucille returned to Gravette, where they lived until his death in 1992.
