= John Burris (Arkansas politician) =

American politician

Minority Leader of the Arkansas House of Representatives
- In office January 10, 2011 – January 2013
- Preceded by: Bryan King

Member of the Arkansas House of Representatives from the 85th district
- In office January 12, 2009 – December 31, 2012
- Preceded by: James Norton
- Succeeded by: David Whitaker

Member of the Arkansas House of Representatives from the 98th district
- In office January 2013 – January 2015
- Preceded by: Donna Hutchinson
- Succeeded by: Ron McNair

Personal details
- Born: September 27, 1985 (age 40) Little Rock, Arkansas, USA
- Party: Republican
- Education: Bergman High School; Arkansas Tech University
- Profession: Partner and lobbyist at Capitol Advisor Group

John Burris (born September 27, 1985) is a Republican former member of the Arkansas House of Representatives. where he served three two-year terms, the maximum allowed by Arkansas term limit laws at the time.

Burris was elected to represent District 85, which then covered the city of Harrison and part of Boone County, in 2008, defeating opponent Bill Witty and becoming, at 23, the youngest person then serving in the Arkansas House. In the 2010 election, Representative Burris was unopposed. Redistricting placed Burris's home in District 98, where, in the 2012 election, he succeeded incumbent Republican Donna Hutchinson, who was term-limited. Burris was unopposed in the primary and general election.

Elected as House Minority Leader in 2010, Burris was the youngest minority leader, at age 25, in the history of the state, and served in that capacity during the 2011 Regular Session and 2012 Fiscal Session. As minority leader, Burris led efforts to recruit and elect Republican candidates, with the party winning a one-vote majority in the November 2012 election. Burris was the Arkansas House Public Health, Welfare, and Labor Committee chairman from 2013 to 2014.

In 2014, he was a candidate for the Arkansas State Senate, losing to fellow Republican Scott Flippo in a runoff primary election in a race where there was no Democratic contender, and, later that year, he received a public letter of caution from the state Ethics Commission related to omitting some information on financial disclosure reports. After losing to Flippo, Burris accepted a private-sector job as a consultant on health policy issues. He had been one of the principal architects of Medicaid expansion in Arkansas

Burris is a partner and lobbyist at Capitol Advisors Group, a Little Rock-based government relations, public affairs, and issue management firm.

Burris was political director for Tom Cotton's 2012 Congressional and 2014 U.S. Senate races.

Burris graduated from Arkansas Tech University (ATU) in Russellville with a Bachelor of Arts in History in 2008. While in high school and at ATU, he was a manager at Wendy's and had worked unloading freight at Home Depot and in a real estate company. From 2014 to 2016, Burris contributed articles to Talk Business & Politics, a news website that covers business, politics, and culture across all Arkansas regions.

Burris is married to Katherine Vasilis, a senior VP and senior account supervisor at CJRW, a Little Rock advertising agency.
