= Gravette, Arkansas =

- City
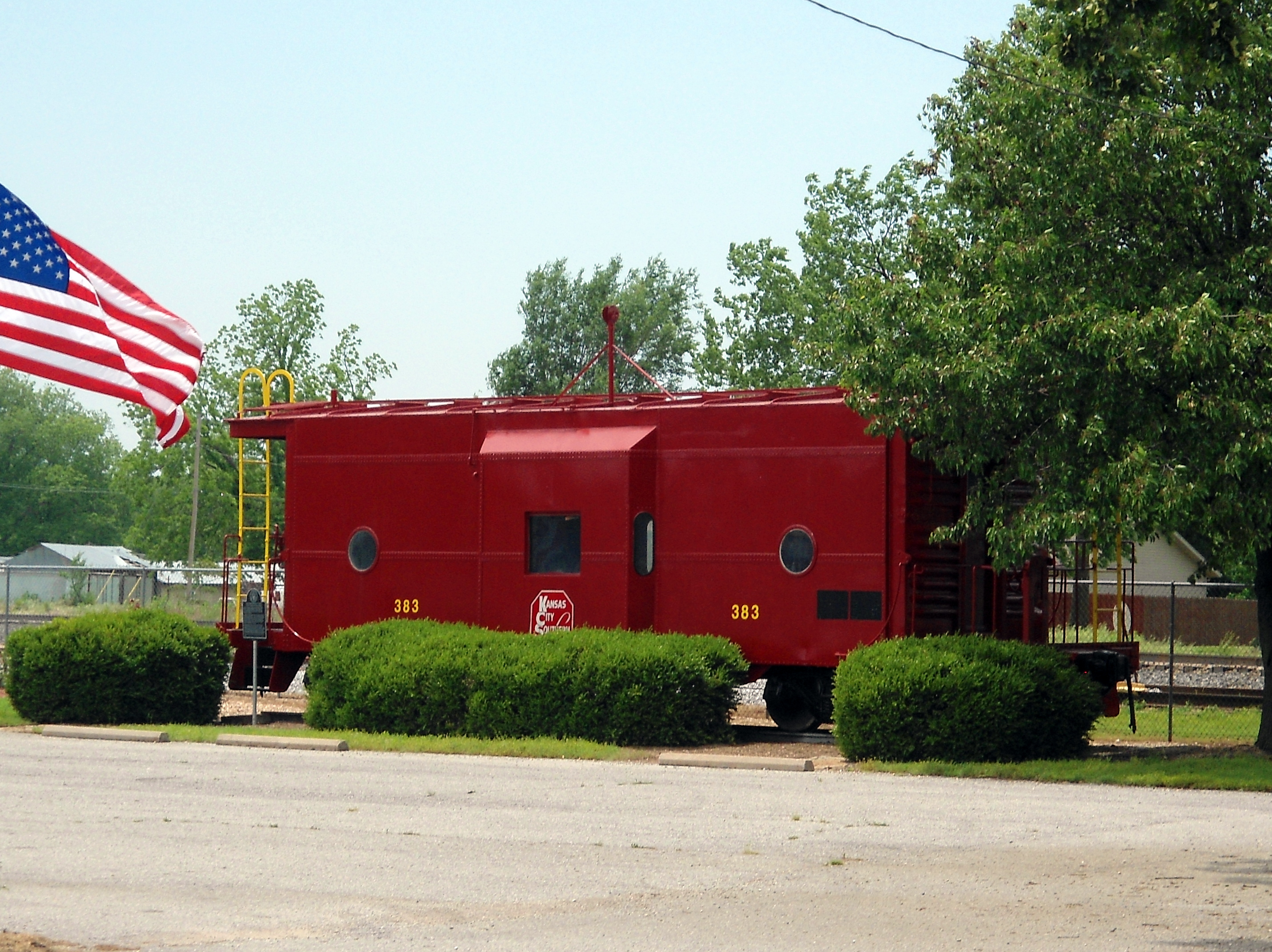
- This historic Kansas City Southern Railway Caboose No. 383 pays homage to the importance of the railroad to Gravette's economy and history.

- Logo
- Motto: "The Heart of Hometown America"
- Location of Gravette in Benton County, Arkansas.
- Coordinates: 36°25′28″N 94°25′26″W
- Country: United States
- State: Arkansas
- County: Benton

Area
  - Total: 15.28 sq mi (39.57 km^{2})
  - Land: 15.28 sq mi (39.57 km^{2})
  - Water: 0 sq mi (0.00 km^{2})
- Elevation: 1,303 ft (397 m)

Population (2020)
  - Total: 3,547
  - Estimate (2025): 3,889 ▲
  - Density: 232.2/sq mi (89.64/km^{2})
- Time zone: UTC-6 (Central (CST))
  - Summer (DST): UTC-5 (CDT)
- ZIP code: 72736
- Area code: 479
- FIPS code: 05-28360
- GNIS feature ID: 2403729
- Website: www.gravettear.com

Gravette /ˈɡrævɪt/ is a city in Benton County, Arkansas, United States. The population was 3,547 as of the 2020 census. It is part of the Northwest Arkansas region.

== History ==
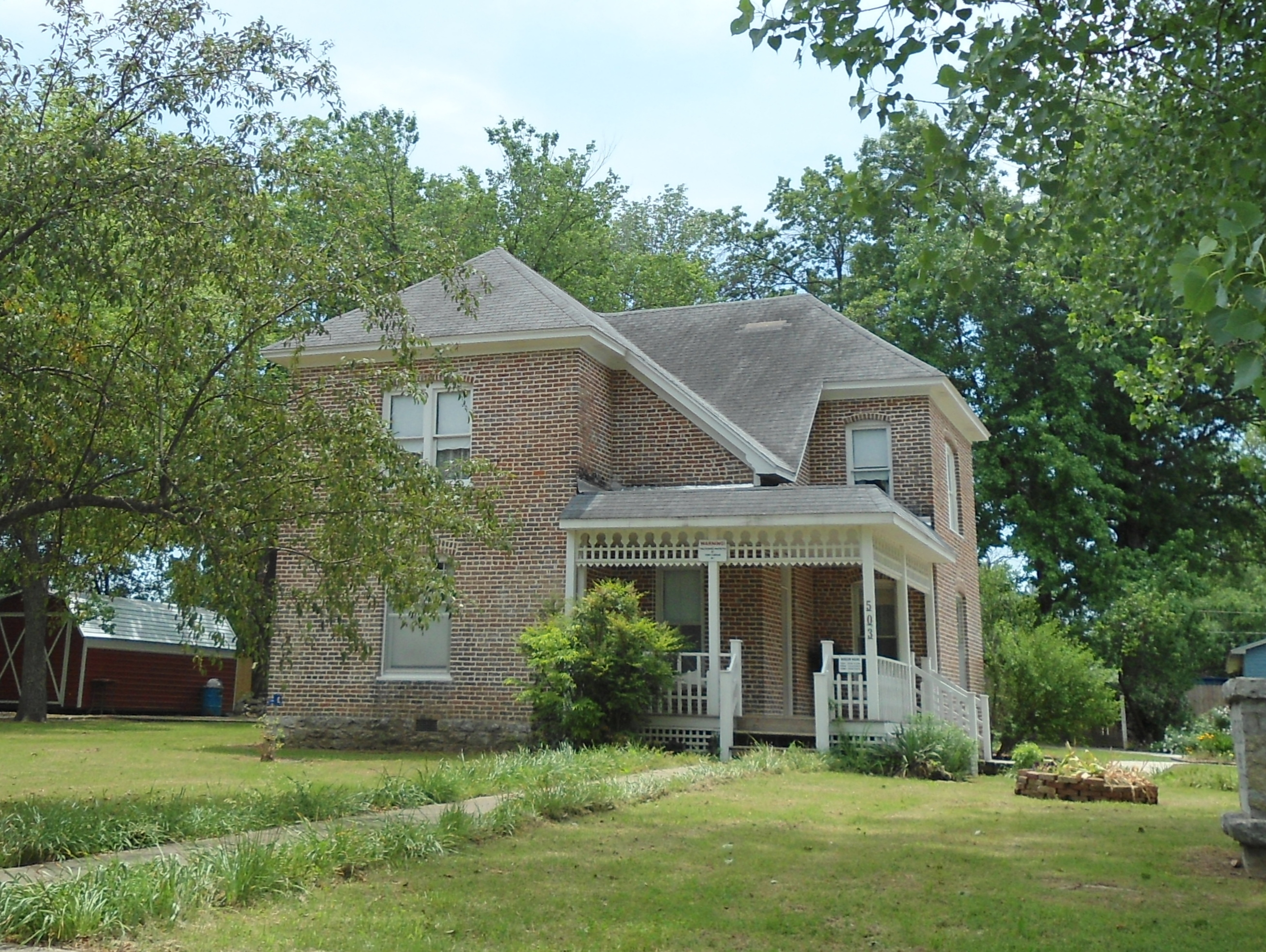
The historic Kindley House was built in 1873 and added to the National Register of Historic Places (NRHP) in 1988.

The original name of the first European-American settlement at this location was Nebo. The Nebo area is now referred to as Old Town in Chalk Valley and was the earliest pioneer settlement of the community. The settlement was platted in the 1870s by Joseph P. Covey, who relocated to Southwest City, Missouri, in 1881. Ellis Tillman Gravett opened the Chalk Valley Distillery in Nebo and was also the proprietor of a general merchandise store. In 1891, he moved that store west out of the valley to what is now downtown Gravette.

Gravette was aided around 1898 by arrival of the Arkansas and Oklahoma Railroad (later acquired by the St. Louis-San Francisco Railway) which greatly stimulated the fruit-growing industry in the region by providing easy access to markets. Gravette was formally incorporated on January 27, 1899. By 1910 the population of Gravette amounted to 569.

== Geography ==
Gravette is located in northwestern Benton County, Arkansas.

According to the United States Census Bureau, as of 2010 the city had a total area of 4.0 square miles (10.4 km^{2}), all land. In 2012, the nearby unincorporated community of Hiwasse was facing annexation by the city of Bella Vista. The majority of people within Hiwasse were opposed and chose to be annexed by Gravette instead. The annexation increased Gravette’s total area to 15.33 sq mi (39.7 km^{2}).

Gravette city limits are situated approximately 3-miles west of Bentonville, Arkansas, the Benton County, Arkansas seat, and 105 miles (169 km) east of Tulsa, Oklahoma, 41 miles (66 km) northwest of Fayetteville, and approximately 60 miles south of Joplin, MO. Several major highways and interstates run through Gravette, including Arkansas highways 72, 59, and 279 and Interstate 49 which has several exits in Gravette.

=== Climate ===
The climate in this area is characterized by hot, humid summers and generally mild to cool winters. According to the Köppen Climate Classification system, Gravette has a humid subtropical climate, abbreviated "Cfa" on climate maps. Gravette is the site of the coldest recorded temperature in Arkansas: −29 °F or −33.9 °C on February 13, 1905.

According weather data tallied between July 1, 1985, and June 30, 2015, for every location in the National Oceanic and Atmospheric Administration's official climate database, Gravette, Arkansas, is the snowiest place in the state of Arkansas with an average of 16 inches or 0.41 metres of snow per year.

Climate data for Gravette, Arkansas, 1991–2020 normals, extremes 1898–present
Month	Jan	Feb	Mar	Apr	May	Jun	Jul	Aug	Sep	Oct	Nov	Dec	Year
Record high °F (°C)	77 (25)	88 (31)	92 (33)	95 (35)	99 (37)	106 (41)	114 (46)	114 (46)	108 (42)	97 (36)	89 (32)	77 (25)	114 (46)
Mean maximum °F (°C)	69.4 (20.8)	73.1 (22.8)	81.0 (27.2)	84.9 (29.4)	89.1 (31.7)	93.9 (34.4)	99.5 (37.5)	100.7 (38.2)	95.2 (35.1)	86.8 (30.4)	76.1 (24.5)	69.4 (20.8)	101.8 (38.8)
Mean daily maximum °F (°C)	48.8 (9.3)	53.9 (12.2)	63.4 (17.4)	72.5 (22.5)	79.5 (26.4)	87.4 (30.8)	92.5 (33.6)	92.1 (33.4)	84.2 (29.0)	72.9 (22.7)	60.7 (15.9)	51.1 (10.6)	71.6 (22.0)
Daily mean °F (°C)	38.7 (3.7)	43.2 (6.2)	52.1 (11.2)	60.7 (15.9)	68.5 (20.3)	76.6 (24.8)	80.9 (27.2)	80.0 (26.7)	72.3 (22.4)	61.4 (16.3)	50.3 (10.2)	41.5 (5.3)	60.5 (15.9)
Mean daily minimum °F (°C)	28.7 (−1.8)	32.5 (0.3)	40.8 (4.9)	49.0 (9.4)	57.5 (14.2)	65.8 (18.8)	69.2 (20.7)	67.8 (19.9)	60.4 (15.8)	49.9 (9.9)	39.8 (4.3)	31.9 (−0.1)	49.4 (9.7)
Mean minimum °F (°C)	6.0 (−14.4)	9.9 (−12.3)	17.4 (−8.1)	28.7 (−1.8)	37.5 (3.1)	51.3 (10.7)	57.3 (14.1)	55.1 (12.8)	42.6 (5.9)	29.6 (−1.3)	18.6 (−7.4)	9.8 (−12.3)	1.6 (−16.9)
Record low °F (°C)	−24 (−31)	−29 (−34)	−14 (−26)	15 (−9)	24 (−4)	39 (4)	44 (7)	42 (6)	28 (−2)	12 (−11)	4 (−16)	−21 (−29)	−29 (−34)
Average precipitation inches (mm)	2.81 (71)	2.66 (68)	3.92 (100)	4.82 (122)	6.21 (158)	4.65 (118)	3.93 (100)	3.47 (88)	4.45 (113)	4.56 (116)	3.93 (100)	3.17 (81)	48.58 (1,235)
Average snowfall inches (cm)	3.6 (9.1)	2.9 (7.4)	3.6 (9.1)	0.1 (0.25)	0.0 (0.0)	0.0 (0.0)	0.0 (0.0)	0.0 (0.0)	0.0 (0.0)	0.1 (0.25)	0.5 (1.3)	1.7 (4.3)	12.5 (31.7)
Average precipitation days (≥ 0.01 in)	7.6	7.1	9.2	9.3	10.4	8.6	7.6	7.1	7.6	8.9	8.0	7.6	99.0
Average snowy days (≥ 0.1 in)	1.9	1.0	0.7	0.0	0.0	0.0	0.0	0.0	0.0	0.0	0.3	1.3	5.2
Source 1: NOAA
Source 2: National Weather Service

== Demographics ==
Historical population
Census	Pop.	Note	%±
1900	447		—
1910	569		27.3%
1920	754		32.5%
1930	812		7.7%
1940	865		6.5%
1950	894		3.4%
1960	855		−4.4%
1970	1,154		35.0%
1980	1,218		5.5%
1990	1,412		15.9%
2000	1,810		28.2%
2010	2,325		28.5%
2020	3,547		52.6%
2025 (est.)	3,889	▲	9.6%
U.S. Decennial Census

=== 2020 census ===
As of the 2020 census, Gravette had a population of 3,547. The median age was 34.5 years. 28.1% of residents were under the age of 18 and 15.4% of residents were 65 years of age or older. For every 100 females, there were 97.1 males, and for every 100 females age 18 and over, there were 93.8 males.

0.0% of residents lived in urban areas, while 100.0% lived in rural areas.

There were 1,281 households and 884 families in Gravette. Of the households, 38.3% had children under the age of 18 living in them. Of all households, 51.8% were married-couple households, 14.8% were households with a male householder and no spouse or partner present, and 25.4% were households with a female householder and no spouse or partner present. About 22.4% of all households were made up of individuals, and 10.5% had someone living alone who was 65 years of age or older.

There were 1,418 housing units, of which 9.7% were vacant. The homeowner vacancy rate was 2.9% and the rental vacancy rate was 7.6%.

Gravette racial composition
Race	Number	Percentage
White (non-Hispanic)	2,865	80.77%
Black or African American (non-Hispanic)	18	0.51%
Native American	110	3.1%
Asian	24	0.68%
Pacific Islander	3	0.08%
Other/Mixed	282	7.95%
Hispanic or Latino	245	6.91%

=== 2010 census ===
As of 2010 Gravette had a population of 2,325, with an estimated 1,418 housing units with a majority being occupied. The median household income is estimated at $46,275. Approximately 16.3% of the population has obtained a bachelor's degree or higher.. The racial and ethnic composition of the population was 87.8% non-Hispanic white, 0.6% black or African American, 3.5% Native American, 0.7% Asian, 4.1% from two or more races and 4.0% Hispanic or Latino.

=== 2000 census ===
As of the census of 2000, there were 1,810 people, 697 households, and 471 families residing in the city. The population density was 775.1 inhabitants per square mile (299.3/km^{2}). There were 773 housing units at an average density of 331.0 per square mile (127.8/km^{2}). The racial makeup of the city was 92.87% White, 0.17% Black or African American, 2.10% Native American, 0.61% Asian, 1.05% from other races, and 3.20% from two or more races. 2.93% of the population were Hispanic or Latino of any race.

There were 697 households, out of which 37.2% had children under the age of 18 living with them, 49.5% were married couples living together, 14.5% had a female householder with no husband present, and 32.4% were non-families. 28.3% of all households were made up of individuals, and 16.2% had someone living alone who was 65 years of age or older. The average household size was 2.48 and the average family size was 3.07.

In the city, the population was spread out, with 29.2% under the age of 18, 8.3% from 18 to 24, 27.0% from 25 to 44, 18.0% from 45 to 64, and 17.6% who were 65 years of age or older. The median age was 36 years. For every 100 females, there were 87.0 males. For every 100 females age 18 and over, there were 82.9 males.

The median income for a household in the city was $29,881, and the median income for a family was $34,844. Males had a median income of $28,571 versus $18,906 for females. The per capita income for the city was $15,241. About 11.5% of families and 16.6% of the population were below the poverty line, including 22.5% of those under age 18 and 19.3% of those age 65 or over.

== Economy ==
R & R Solutions, a packaging and logistics company is one of the largest employers in Gravette. Two plastics production companies, Hendren Plastics and Insul-Bead, are located in Gravette and produce a variety of products, most notably dock floatation devices that are shipped nationwide.

== Parks and recreation ==
Gravette has eight parks throughout the city and two walk-bike trails. The city has three community buildings.

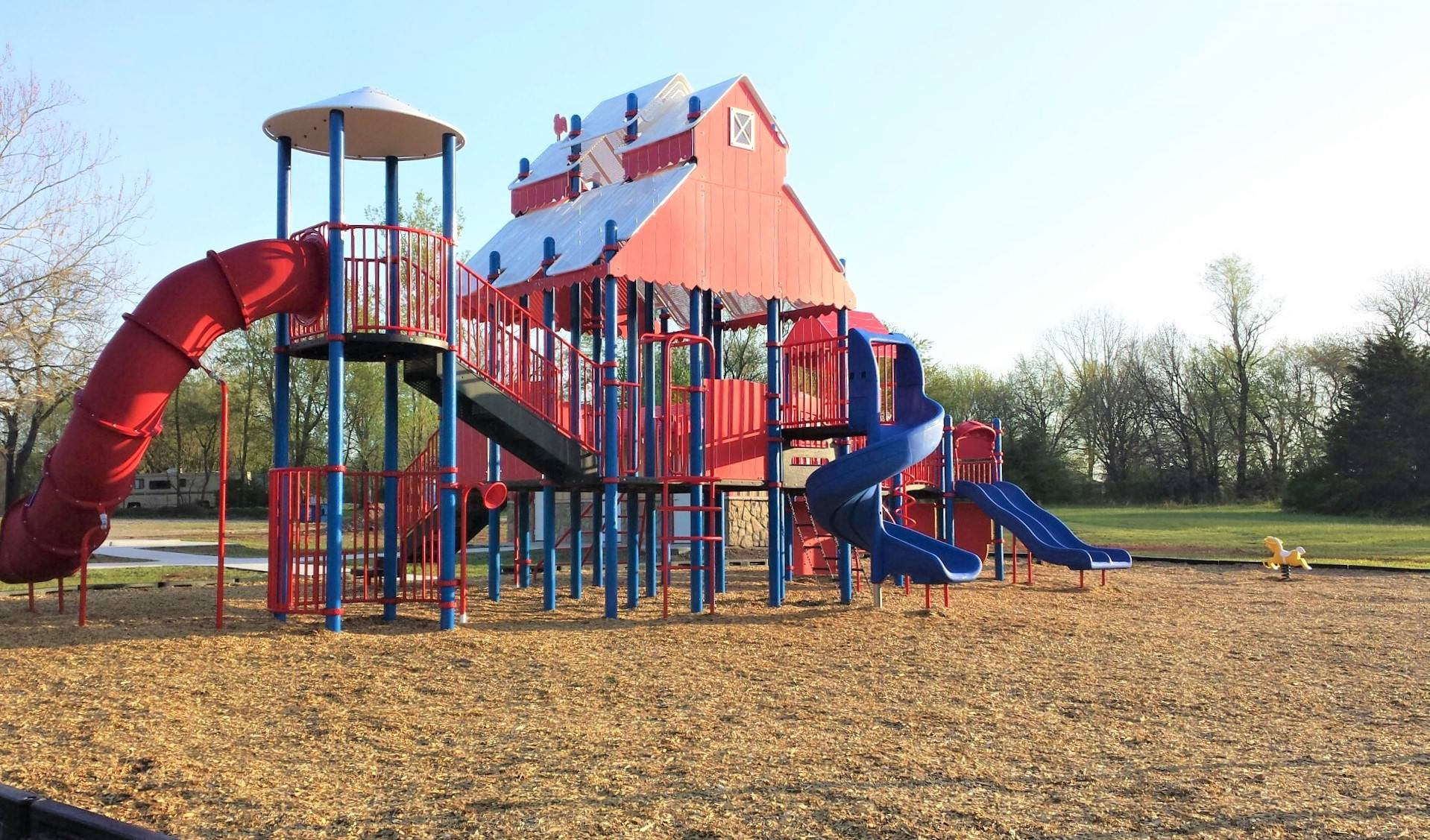

Old Town Park features a playground, 9-hole disc golf course, large pavilion, and a shaded, fenced playground area specifically for toddlers. The farmer's market is a seasonal attraction that sets up at Old Town Park and features locally grown produce, meats, and goods. The Gravette skate park is a small skate park adjacent to Pop Allum Park and features quarter-pipes, hand rails, and a fun box. The pool and splash park is a seasonal attraction that features a large swimming pool with slide, and 3,000 square foot splash park with water spouts, splash buckets, spraying water, and small water slides. Hiwasse Park has a fire station themed playground, 1/4-mile concrete walking trail, full-size basketball court, full-size tennis court, and large green space. There is also a pavilion and restrooms. Centennial Park is home to several permanent food trucks. It features a train caboose that was donated to the city by Kansas City Southern. Kindley Park, named after Field E. Kindley, is near downtown Gravette. It has a half-court basketball court, a half-court tennis court, two playgrounds, a pavilion, and a T-33 aircraft on loan from the National Museum of the U.S. Air Force. Pop Allum Park has seven baseball fields and four soccer fields of varying sizes. There is a small playground. On the south end of the park lies the Gravette nature trail. The Gravette dog park is near downtown Gravette and features separate areas for large and small dogs.

== Education ==
Public education in the majority of Gravette is provided by the Gravette School District, which operates Gravette High School. A small section of Gravette to the east is in the Bentonville School District.

School zoning for the Bentonville section is as follows: Thomas Jefferson Elementary School, Divided between Old High Middle School and Ruth Barker Middle School, Lincoln Junior High School, and Bentonville High School.

== Infrastructure ==
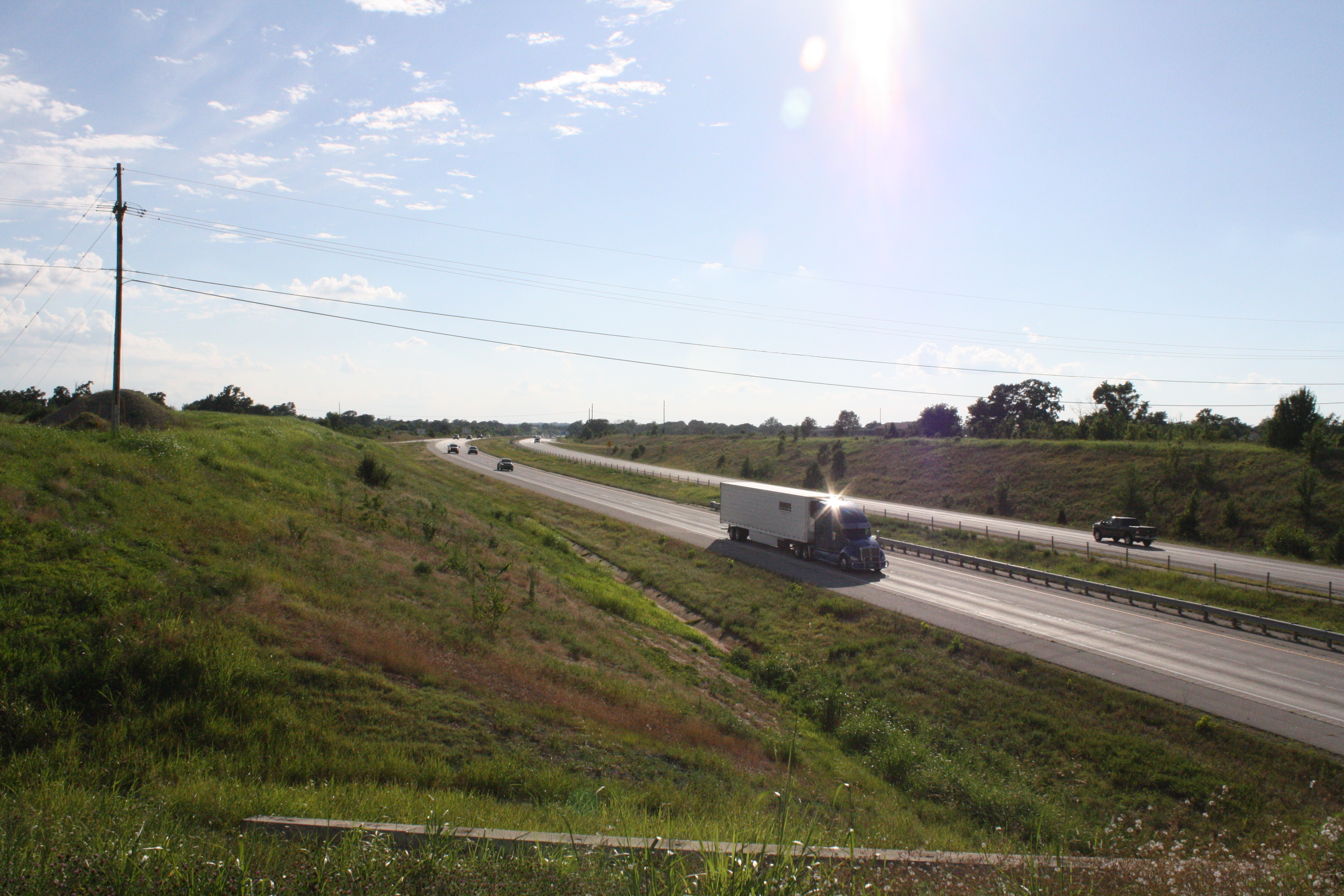
Looking west along I-49 from the AR 72 overpass in Gravette

=== Healthcare ===
Ozarks Community Hospital is headquartered in Gravette and has a hospital and healthcare clinic in town.

=== Public safety ===
The Gravette Fire Department runs an ALS ambulance service in the city limits. The department is staffed full-time with paramedics and EMTs.

== Notable people ==
- Lloyd Andrews, Western actor and host of children's TV shows
- Jim Hendren, current Arkansas state senator
- Field Eugene Kindley, aviator and World War I flying ace
- Tommy Morrison, world heavyweight champion
- Arnold Murray, pastor and TV evangelist (1929–2014)
- Mary Lou Slinkard, current Arkansas state representative
- Gene Stephens, former Major League Baseball player
