= 1980 United States Senate election in Arkansas =

- November 4, 1980
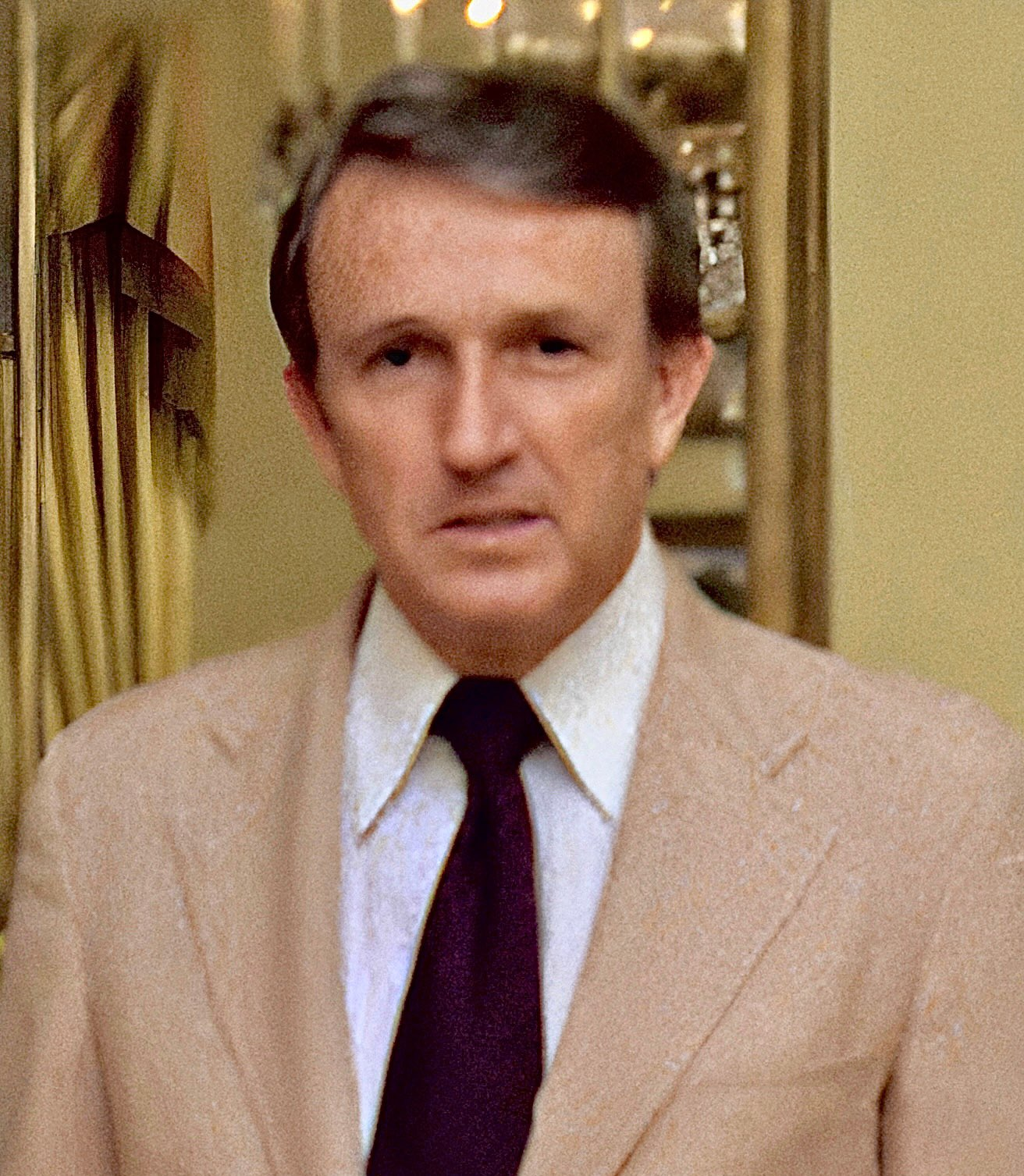

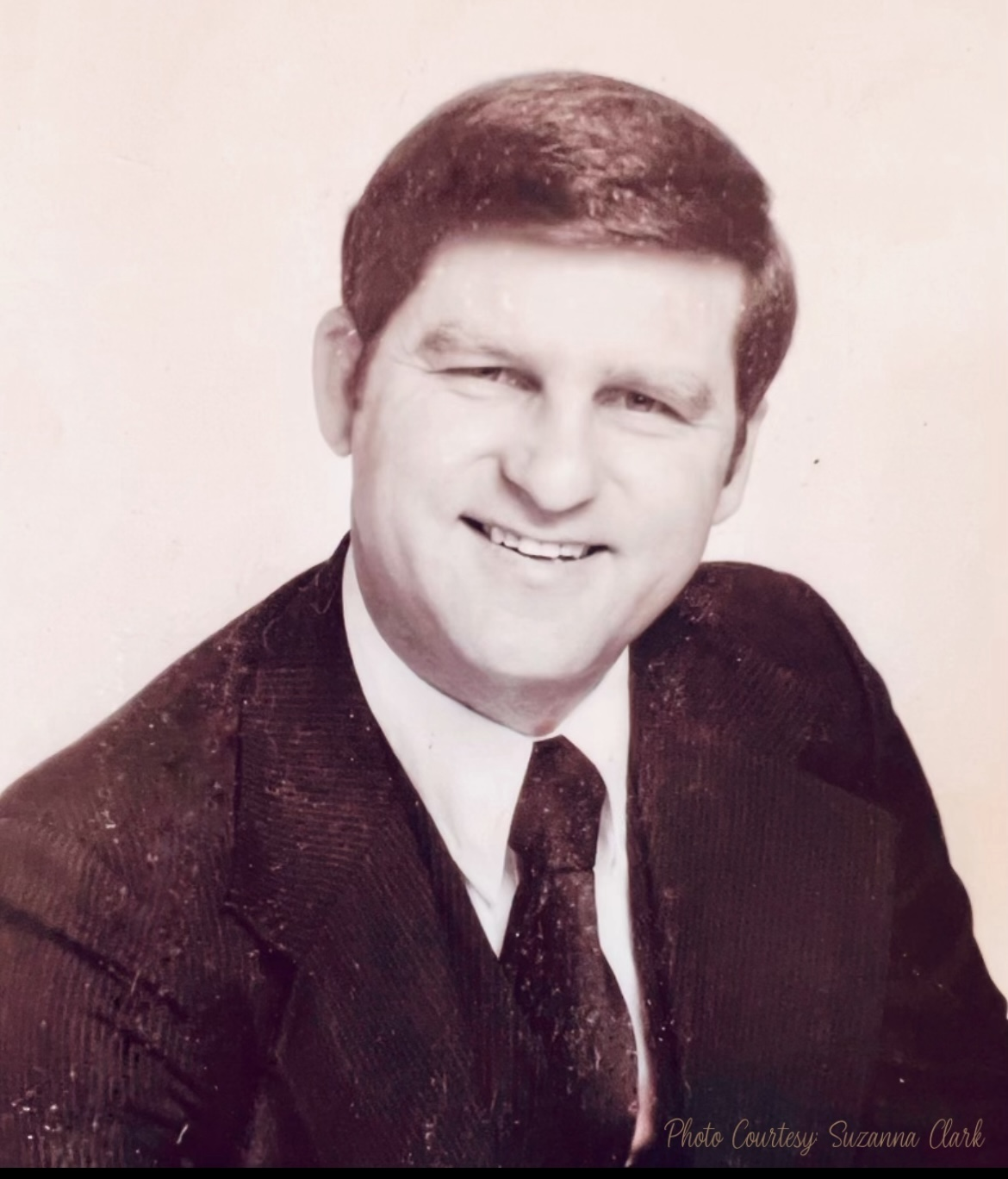
Nominee	Dale Bumpers	William Clark
Party	Democratic	Republican
Popular vote	477,905	330,576
Percentage	59.09%	40.87%
- County results Bumpers: 50–60% 60–70% 70–80% Clark: 50–60% 60–70% 70–80%
U.S. senator before election
Dale Bumpers
Democratic
Elected U.S. Senator
Dale Bumpers
Democratic

The 1980 United States Senate election in Arkansas was held on November 4, 1980. Incumbent Democratic U.S. Senator Dale Bumpers won re-election to a second term. This election was Bumpers's closest election in his senatorial career.

== Background ==
Elected in 1974, Dale Bumpers was a very popular Senator and was widely seen as the favorite in his 1980 re-election bid. During his time in the Senate, Bumpers was known for "bucking the conservative winds blowing across his state.". The "bucking" was most evident in 1978 when Senator Bumpers voted for the Panama Canal treaties. Bumpers had considered this issue to be the "hottest of his career" as many of his constituents opposed these treaties. During this time, Bumpers had started getting a reputation of having a liberal voting record. Many observed that Bumpers's was much more liberal than his constituents. Despite this, Bumpers still had a high approval rating. The reason for this was that many Arkansans liked his personality and didn't mind his political positions. Bumpers was viewed as a potential presidential candidate in 1976 but decided against running. Many people believed that Bumpers's key vote in killing labor law reform in 1978, a vote that angered organized labor and had not been forgotten by labor leaders, discouraged him from running. Between 1974 and 1980, Bumpers was not a member of any Senate committees and opposed all constitutional amendments proposed during this time. Bumpers's first term helped establish his identity as a fiscally responsible, socially liberal constitutionalist.

== Major candidates ==
=== Democratic ===
- Dale Bumpers, incumbent U.S. senator and former governor

=== Republican ===
Only one Republican filed to run, William P. "Bill" Clark. Clark filed for the Senate race only one hour prior to the deadline.

- William Clark, real estate broker

== General election ==
Bumpers's opponent, William P. "Bill" Clark, had previously run for office but was unsuccessful. Clark ran for the Democratic nomination for Arkansas's 2nd congressional district but lost to Jim Guy Tucker. In the start of the campaign, Clark accused Bumpers of being "fuzzy on the issues" and challenged Bumpers's support for gasoline rationing during the energy crisis. Clark criticized Bumpers for having voted against defense appropriations twenty-three times between 1975 and 1978 and noted, "Only this year [when seeking reelection] he has voted for a couple of defense items." Clark questioned Bumpers's opposition to school prayer and support for the Panama Canal Treaties of 1978. Clark further claimed that Bumpers had derided citizens of Newton County, a frequent Republican stronghold in Arkansas, as "stupid hill people". During the campaign, Clark constantly asked voters, "If Dale Bumpers doesn't vote for you, why should you vote for him?"

== Results ==
Despite Ronald Reagan winning the state in the concurring presidential election and incumbent Governor Bill Clinton losing his re-election bid, Dale Bumpers was re-elected to a second term. Bumpers lost his home county of Franklin. This is the only time Bumpers lost his home county.

Arkansas Senate election 1980
Party	Candidate	Votes	%
Democratic	Dale Bumpers (Incumbent)	477,905	59.09%
Republican	Bill Clark	360,576	40.87%
Independent	Walter McCarty	331	0.04%
Democratic hold			

== See also ==
- 1980 United States Senate elections
