= 1974 United States Senate election in Arkansas =

- November 5, 1974
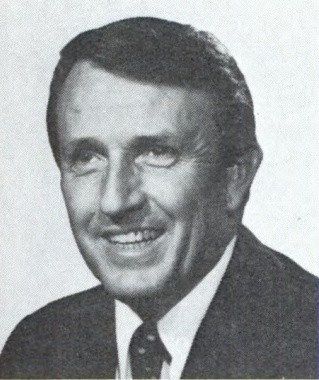

Nominee	Dale Bumpers	John H. Jones
Party	Democratic	Republican
Popular vote	461,056	82,026
Percentage	84.90%	15.10%
- County results Bumpers: 60–70% 70–80% 80–90% >90%
U.S. senator before election
J. William Fulbright
Democratic
Elected U.S. Senator
Dale Bumpers
Democratic

The 1974 United States Senate election in Arkansas took place on November 5, 1974.

Incumbent Democratic U.S. Senator J. William Fulbright ran for re-election to a sixth term in office, but was defeated handily in the Democratic primary by Governor of Arkansas Dale Bumpers. Bumpers won the general election.

== Democratic primary ==
=== Campaign ===
J. William Fulbright had been a mainstay in Arkansas politics for many decades, and sought a sixth term while still remaining the junior senator to John McClellan.

Dale Bumpers, originally a charismatic lawyer from Charleston, was the incumbent governor of Arkansas. He had defeated staunch segregationist Orval Faubus in the 1970 primary and had been re-elected in 1972. His campaign had been spurred by the need to provide for his family with the $42,500 he would make as a senator.

After Bumpers announced his candidacy, Fulbright did not take his opponent's campaign seriously. However, Bumpers' decision would spell the end of Fulbright's career in the Senate in dramatic fashion. This victory earned him the nickname "The Giant Killer".

Fulbright's staggering loss was seen by analysts as a result of low confidence in Congress in the wake of the Watergate scandal. This success also tipped him to be on the ticket in the 1976 presidential election.

=== Candidates ===
- Dale Bumpers, governor of Arkansas
- J. William Fulbright, incumbent U.S. senator since 1945

=== Results ===
Democratic primary results
Party	Candidate	Votes	%
Democratic	Dale Bumpers	380,748	65.04
Democratic	J. William Fulbright (incumbent)	204,630	34.96
Total votes		585,378	100.00

== General election ==
=== Campaign ===
Jones accused Bumpers of excessive spending as governor, citing the construction of a $186 million state office complex. Bumpers not only ignored Jones, but campaigned mostly for the young Democrat (and future President) Bill Clinton, who failed to unseat Republican U.S. Representative John Paul Hammerschmidt in Arkansas's 3rd congressional district.

=== Results ===
1974 United States Senate election in Arkansas
Party	Candidate	Votes	%	±%
Democratic	Dale Bumpers	461,056	84.90	▲25.75
Republican	John H. Jones	82,026	15.10	▼25.75
Total votes		543,082	100.00	
Democratic hold		Swing		

== See also ==
- 1974 United States Senate elections
