= W. R. Bumpers =

American politician and business owner

William Rufus Bumpers (c. 1888 – March 20, 1949), also known as Bill Bumpers or W. R. Bumpers, was an American business owner and member of the Arkansas House of Representatives. He operated a hardware store, as well as a funeral home business, in Charleston, Arkansas.

== Life and career ==
William Rufus Bumpers was born on March 9, 1888, in Cecil, Arkansas. He attended Hendrix College, where he was a member of the football team.

Bumpers opened a hardware store and sold feed in Charleston, Arkansas.

In 1912, Bumpers married Lattie Lattis Jones. The couple had four children, the first-born of whom died as a child.

He was elected to the State House in 1932. He was a member of the Democratic Party.

== Death and legacy ==
On March 20, 1949, the Bumpers and another couple from Charleston were involved in a head-on collision on U.S. Route 64 near Muldrow, Oklahoma. Bumpers died from injuries sustained in the crash one week later, five days after his wife also died as a result of the incident. He was 61 years old.

One of their sons, Dale Bumpers, was later elected as Governor of Arkansas and to the United States Senate. His positions in the latter included being Chairman of the Small Business Committee and Ranking Member of the Energy and Natural Resources Committee.
