= 1986 United States Senate election in Arkansas =

United States Senate election

- November 4, 1986
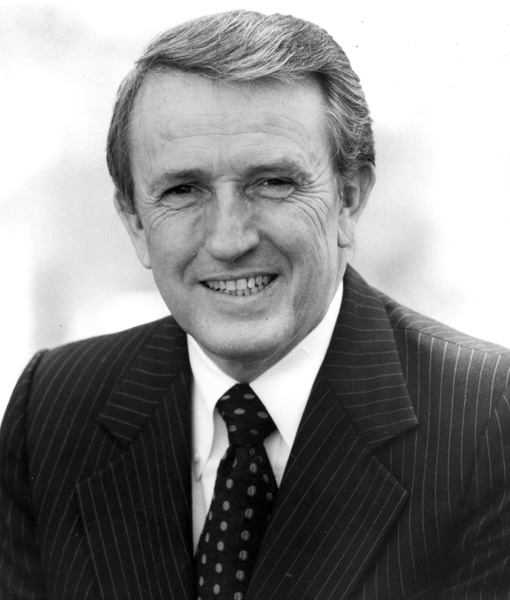

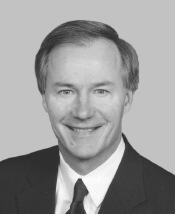
Nominee	Dale Bumpers	Asa Hutchinson
Party	Democratic	Republican
Popular vote	433,122	262,313
Percentage	62.28%	37.72%
- County results Bumpers: 50–60% 60–70% 70–80% 80–90% Hutchinson: 50–60%
U.S. senator before election
Dale Bumpers
Democratic
Elected U.S. Senator
Dale Bumpers
Democratic

The 1986 United States Senate election in Arkansas was held November 4, 1986. Incumbent Democratic U.S. Senator Dale Bumpers won re-election to a third term.

== Major candidates ==
=== Democratic ===
- Dale Bumpers, incumbent U.S. Senator and former Governor

=== Republican ===
- Asa Hutchinson, former U.S. Attorney and future congressman and Governor

== Results ==
Arkansas Senate election 1986
Party	Candidate	Votes	%
Democratic	Dale Bumpers (Incumbent)	433,122	62.28%
Republican	Asa Hutchinson	262,313	37.72%
Independent	Ralph Forbes	52	0.01%
Majority		170,809	24.56%
Turnout		695,487	
Democratic hold			

== See also ==
- 1986 United States Senate elections
