= COVID-19 pandemic in Arkansas =

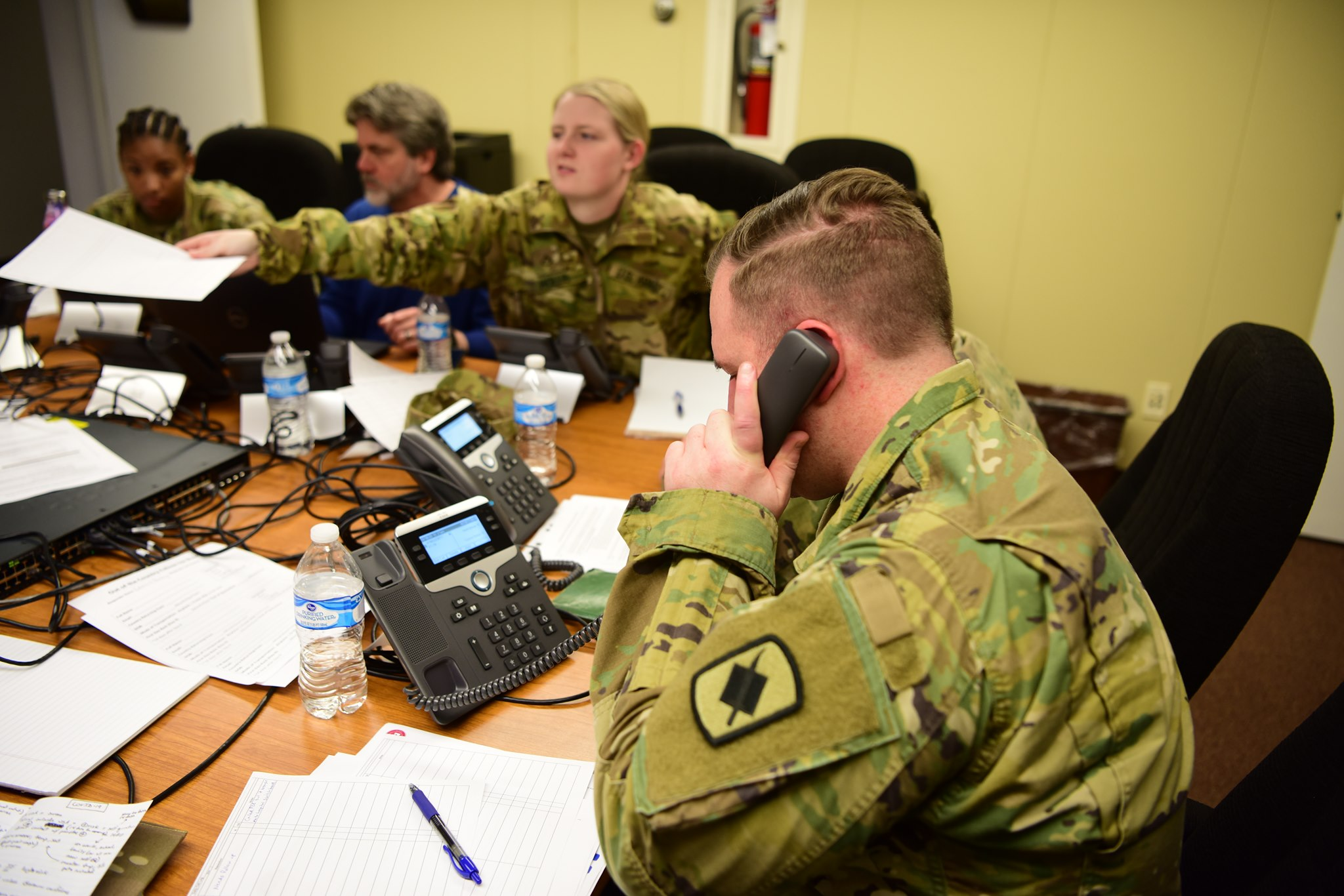
- Arkansas National Guard soldiers staff phones for Arkansans' questions about COVID-19
- Disease: COVID-19
- Pathogen: SARS-CoV-2
- Location: Arkansas, U.S.
- First outbreak: Wuhan, Hubei, China
- Index case: Pine Bluff
- Arrival date: March 11, 2020 (6 years, 6 months, 2 weeks and 2 days)
- Confirmed cases: 1,040,155
- Deaths: 13,429

Government website
- Official website (archived)

The COVID-19 pandemic was confirmed to have reached the U.S. state of Arkansas in March 2020. The first case in Arkansas was reported on March 11, 2020, in Pine Bluff, Jefferson County. As of March 2022, there were 819,984 cumulative cases of COVID-19 with a total of 10,524 deaths.

As of March 1, 2022, Arkansas has fully vaccinated 1,566,786 people, or 54% of the population.

== Timeline ==
=== March 2020 ===
==== March 1–14 ====
On March 11, Governor Asa Hutchinson confirmed the state's first presumptive positive coronavirus case in Pine Bluff.

On March 12, five more presumptive cases were reported, four of which had contact with the original Pine Bluff case, prompting the governor to order school closings in Grant, Jefferson, Pulaski, and Saline counties. The original Pine Bluff case likely became infected in New Orleans during Mardi Gras.

On March 13, Governor Hutchinson announced three more presumptive cases in the state, including the first instance of community spread. He recommended not to hold gatherings of more than 200 people in the counties with affected cases.

In early March, a rural pastor and his wife attended church events, without knowing they already had the virus, resulting in 35 cases among 92 church attendees, 7 hospitalizations, and 3 deaths. Secondary contacts had 26 additional cases and one death.

==== March 15–18 ====
On March 15, Governor Hutchinson reported during a press conference that all public schools would close beginning Tuesday, March 17, with the option of closing Monday, March 16, if they were prepared. Schools would remain closed through spring break the following week. Earlier in the day, the Arkansas Department of Health's website was updated to show that there were 16 confirmed cases in the state.

On March 16, Governor Hutchinson recommended that the number of people in events should be limited to 50, per CDC guidelines. He also discouraged unnecessary out-of-state travel. A pastor and his wife in a rural church was confirmed to have COVID-19 after church services held March 6–11. Of the 92 attendees of church services, 35 were confirmed to be infected and three died. The Arkansas Department of Health worked with the church and used contact tracing to identify an additional 26 people confirmed to have the virus, one of which died.

On March 17, Governor Hutchinson ordered all casinos closed for two weeks and said that for the next 30 days, the one-week waiting period and work reporting requirement to receive unemployment benefits would be waived.

On March 18, Governor Hutchinson said the state was working to allocate $12 million in federal Community Development Block Grant funds, aiming to target hospitals and other businesses essential to the coronavirus response. Additionally, he said he would allocate $4 million from the state's Quick Action Closing Fund which would provide loans of up to $250,000 to help businesses make payroll and stay open. The state also requested a disaster declaration from the Small Business Administration which would help provide loans of up to $2 million to provide capital for businesses. The state is also relaxed SNAP work requirements through May.

==== March 19–22 ====
On March 19, the state government stated public schools would remain closed through April 17; restaurants and bars would not be allowed to provide dine-in services but could still provide carryout, curbside pickup, or delivery, beginning March 20; state government employees would begin remote work; healthcare providers would begin screening all visitors and staff for fever and symptoms; and indoor venues such as gyms would be closed to visitors.

On March 20, thirteen new cases were reported that were connected to a nursing home in Little Rock where four staff and nine residents tested positive. Education Secretary Johnny Key said that the state would apply for a federal government waiver to standardized testing requirements. Attorney General Leslie Rutledge said an additional $3 million would be added to the loan program for small businesses that the governor announced on March 18. Col. John Schuette, installation commander of the Little Rock Air Force Base, announced that an active-duty U.S. Air Force airman assigned to the base tested positive. A 30-day public health emergency for the base was declared.

On March 21, the state projected the spread of the virus would peak in 6 to 8 weeks, at which time there would be an estimated 1,000 Arkansans hospitalized with the disease.

On March 22, Arkansas reported that the state received 25 percent of the PPE requested from the federal government's national stockpile. 8,000 to 10,000 Arkansans had filed for unemployment in the previous week. Due to such a high number of claims, Governor Hutchinson said he would ask the Arkansas General Assembly to approve $1.1 million from the rainy day fund for upgrades to the unemployment system. Secretary of Commerce Mike Preston said the Arkansas Economic Development Commission had received around 300 calls and emails inquiring about the business loans the governor had outlined earlier in the week.

==== March 23–26 ====
The individual income tax filing deadline was moved to July 15 and Governor Hutchinson planned to call for a special legislative session to deal with expected budget shortfalls due to the pandemic. Corporate taxes would still be due April 15. Governor Hutchinson expected an estimated $353 million shortfall for the state budget. Barber shops, beauty and nail salons, massage parlors, and tattoo shops were ordered closed beginning Tuesday, March 24. In Cleburne County, a deacon for a local church said that 34 people who attended an event at the church had tested positive and others were awaiting results.

The first death in the state was reported on March 24, a 91-year-old male from Faulkner County. In his daily press conference, Governor Hutchinson reported that a second death had also occurred, a 59-year-old male from Sherwood. Governor Hutchinson reaffirmed that he did not want to issue a shelter-in-place order like other states had despite saying the state was still in the beginning stages of its outbreak. Both Governor Hutchinson and Dr. Nate Smith remarked that April 12 would be too early for the state to return to normal operations, which is the date U.S. president Donald Trump had targeted during an interview earlier in the day.

On March 25, the ADH issued a recommendation that all travelers from New York and all international travelers should self-quarantine for 14 days. On March 26, the state reported its third death from the virus, a 73-year-old male from Cleburne County. Governor Hutchinson announced a $116 million plan to provide support for healthcare workers in the state, with $91 million coming from the federal government. This plan would provide nurses an additional $1,000 a month with that number rising to $2,000 a month for nurses treating a COVID-19 patient.

==== March 27–31 ====
On March 28, the state confirmed two more deaths, bringing the total to five. Both cases were in central Arkansas, with one person being in their 70s and the other in their 40s. The number of unemployment claims for the previous week were a record 30,000, an increase from the 9,400 the previous week.

On March 30, the state reported its seventh death, an 83-year-old woman infected in a nursing home in Little Rock. The state legislative leaders approved Governor Hutchinson's request to use $45 million from the newly created COVID-19 rainy-day fund. These funds would primarily be used for the purchase of personal protective equipment (PPE).

=== April 2020 ===
==== April 1–6 ====
Arkansas Department of Parks and Tourism Secretary Stacy Hurst, in an effort to limit out-of-state tourists, announced that state parks would no longer allow overnight stays and would limit the number of available parking spaces. Certain trails at Petit Jean State Park and Pinnacle Mountain State Park were deemed problematic and closed. Governor Hutchinson made a recommendation to the United States Secretary of the Interior, David Bernhardt, that the Buffalo National River be closed. State Rep. Reginald Murdock of Marianna announced that he had tested positive for COVID-19.

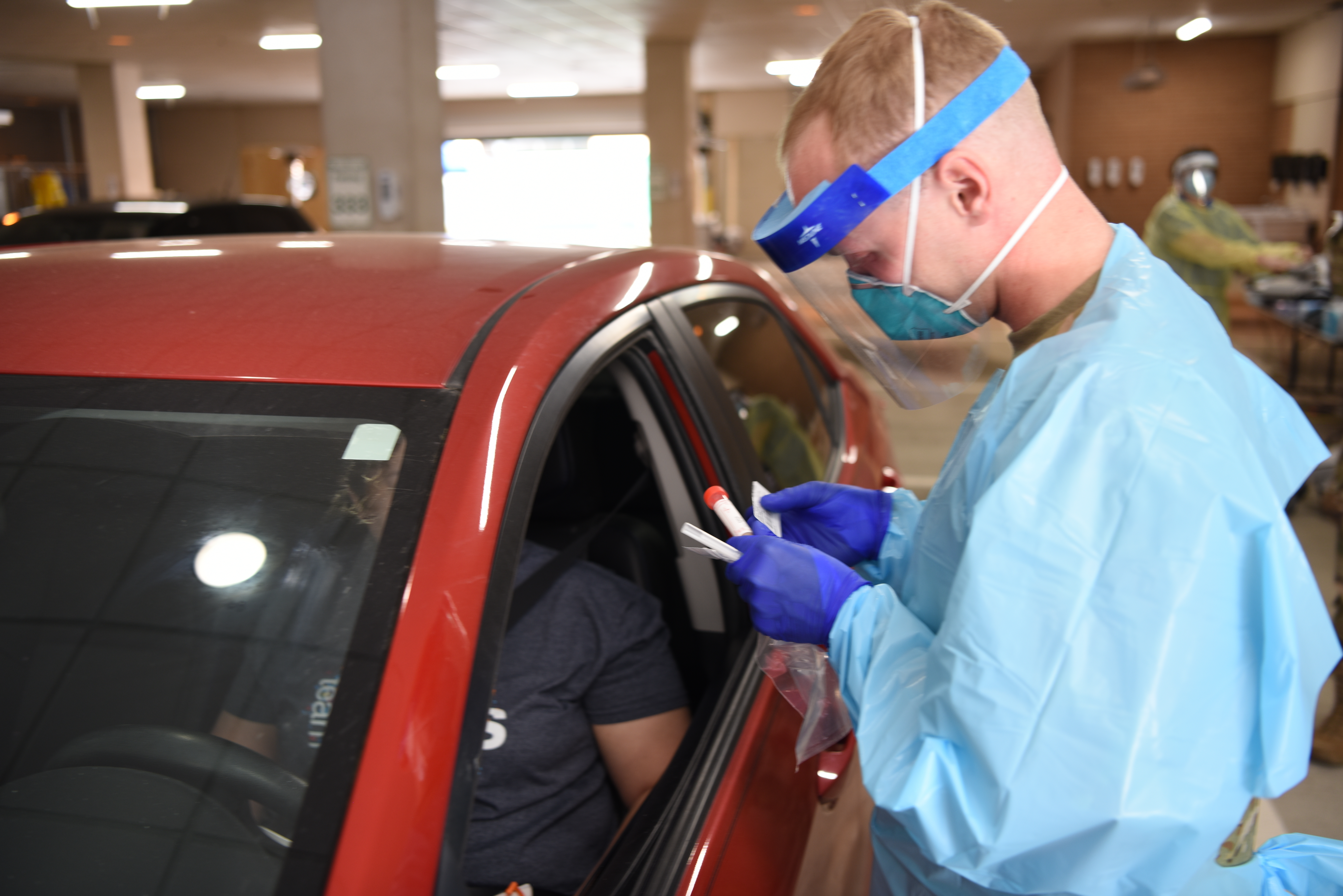
An Arkansas National Guardsman preparing a nasopharyngeal swab at a drive-thru COVID-19 testing site

On April 2, Governor Hutchinson defended his decision to not order a shelter-in-place, arguing that the steps the state had taken were enough and that an official order to close non-essential businesses would put at least 100,000 more Arkansans out of work. Wendy Kelly, director of the Arkansas Department of Correction, announced that the state's prisoners would be manufacturing cloth masks for the prison system, with an expectation of 80,000 masks being produced. A second member of the state legislature, Rep. Vivian Flowers of Pine Bluff, tested positive.

On April 4, Governor Hutchinson signed an executive order limiting the types of guests that can stay at hotels, motels, and vacation rentals to: healthcare professionals; first responders; law enforcement; state or federal employees on official business; National Guard members on active duty; airline crew members; patients of hospitals and their families; journalists; persons unable to return to their home due to COVID-19 travel restrictions; Arkansas citizens unable to return to their home due to exigent circumstances, such as fire, flood, tornado, or other disaster; persons in need of shelter due to domestic violence or homelessness; employees of hotels, motels, or other service providers/contractors of a hotel or motel; and persons away from their home due to work or work-related travel. He added that the state had seen a 40 percent reduction in travel since the beginning of the emergency. The Arkansas National Guard work at delivery of Personal Protection Equipment to designated healthcare facilities.

On April 6, Governor Hutchinson announced that schools would remain closed for the remainder of the school year. He also announced that the state would send five ventilators to Louisiana to help with their spread of the disease, saying Arkansas has around 800 ventilators with about 550 not being used.

==== April 28–30 ====
On April 28, Secretary Hurst announced that beginning May 1, Arkansas residents with self-contained campers would be allowed to return to state parks, and that overnight cabins and lodges would reopen for weekend stays for in-state residents beginning May 15, along with restaurants and food service within parks, museums, exhibits, and visitors centers.

On April 29, Governor Hutchinson said that restaurants may choose to reopen on May 11 at one-third of their capacity along with other restrictions. Bars, bars within restaurants, and entertainment at restaurants would not be allowed to reopen. He announced a $15 million grant program to help business pay for expenses related to reopening with the funds coming from money the state received from the federal Coronavirus Aid, Relief, and Economic Security Act. On April 30, he further announced that gyms and athletic clubs could reopen on May 4 with sanitation and social distancing measures. Showers, pools, spas, and saunas would continue to be banned from use.

=== May 2020 ===
On May 4, Governor Hutchinson announced that large indoor venues could reopen on May 18 for audiences of fewer than 50, with strict social distancing protocols among those in attendance and performers. On May 23, Governor Hutchinson cautioned Arkansas residents to maintain social distancing on Memorial Day weekend when a cluster of coronavirus cases occurred after a high school swim party that month.

=== June 2020 ===
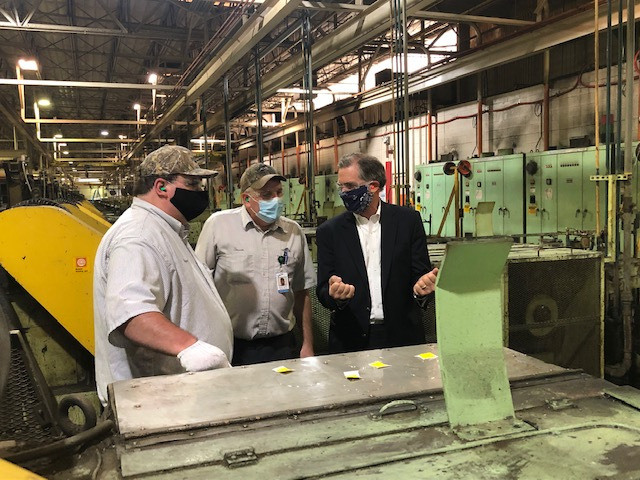
Representative French Hill visiting a factory in Conway, Arkansas

On June 15, Governor Hutchinson moved Arkansas into Phase 2 of reopening, allowing businesses to fill up to two thirds capacity. This resulted in a spike of over 3000 new cases.

On June 16, the city of Fayetteville published a mask mandate due to the recent spike in cases.

=== July 2020 ===
On July 11, Arkansas saw its biggest one-day jump to date in cases with 1,061 new reported infections.

On July 20, University of Arkansas Chancellor Joe Steinmetz announced that the university will be providing personal protection kits to all students and faculty preceding the Fall 2020 semester. He also announced the continued offering of hybrid courses and enforcement of mask requirements on campus facilities.

During the month of July, Arkansas saw a 63% increase in deaths and an 84% increase in hospitalizations, greatly exceeding the national average of only a 19% increase in deaths in July.

=== August 2020 ===
On August 7, Governor Hutchinson declared COVID-19 to be a valid reason to vote absentee in the 2020 election.

On August 31, the University of Arkansas reported 151 new cases at its Fayetteville campus, for a total of 222 active cases. Public schools reported 440 active cases, for a total of 1,198 since June 15.

=== September 2020 ===
On September 3, there had been at least 4,627 cases among Arkansas poultry workers.

On September 4, the state had conducted about 11,000 tests in one day, with a positivity rate was near 10%. This was the largest one-day increase in new cases, driven by cases at the University of Arkansas.

By September 26, Arkansas passed 80,000 cumulative cases of COVID-19 with Northwest Arkansas having the most cases of the virus.

=== October 2020 ===
By October 3, the state had more than 1,400 deaths from coronavirus, with 1,260 being confirmed cases and 147 being probable.

On October 6, Governor Hutchinson reported that hospitalizations reached an all-time high of 529 with the previous record being 526 in early August.

By October 8, Arkansas had exceeded 90,000 cumulative cases of COVID-19, with Pulaski county having the most at 9,653 persons.

On October 9, the state had more than 7,000 active cases of coronavirus and over 91,000 cumulative cases.

By October 10, Arkansas surpassed 92,000 cumulative cases.

On October 11, The Baptist Health Center for Clinical Research announced the need for 800 volunteers from the state for a 25-month COVID-19 vaccine trial in conjunction with drug manufacturer Moderna.

Seven months to the week that the state declared initial emergency order to fight the spread of coronavirus, Governor Hutchinson extended it by another 60 days due to rising cases, especially in rural counties throughout the state.

On October 14, the state received over 100,000 rapid testing kits from the White House which the governor planned on prioritizing to for schools, department of correction personnel, and human resource services.

By October 18, Arkansas surpassed 1,700 deaths due to COVID-19.

On October 20, the state passed over 100,000 total cases of coronavirus since the start of the pandemic, with a total of 8,422 active cases. Governor Hutchinson announced in a briefing the limiting future appearances, after being potentially exposed the previous week to one state senator and two house members who tested positive for COVID-19. All legislative meetings by the Arkansas House of Representatives were postponed for the remainder of the week, following the developments. The following day on October 21, two more senators revealed they tested positive for the coronavirus.

By October 22, according to data collected by The New York Times, Arkansas was averaging 907 cases per day, an increase of 23% percent from the previous average two weeks prior.

On October 23, active cases past 9,000 for the first time since the start of the pandemic.

Arkansas Surgeon General, Gregory Bledsoe, on October 28 was the 11th state official to test positive for the coronavirus, along with his immediate family which includes state Senator Cecile Bledsoe.

By October 30, Arkansas had over 110,000 total cases of coronavirus since the state's first case.

=== November 2020 ===
On November 5, Arkansas posted a new record in daily cases with a spike of 1,548 positive cases.

=== June 2021 ===
As Arkansas was one of five U.S. states with less than 35% of its population vaccinated, Dr. Scott Gottlieb, former commissioner of the U.S. Food and Drug Administration, predicted the state was at risk for outbreaks of the Delta variant. Gottlieb was right. Republican Gov. Asa Hutchinson of Arkansas said on 2 July low vaccination rates in his state are the reason covid cases are skyrocketing there.

=== July 2021 ===
As of July 25, 2021, 40.9% of the population 12 years and up (1,045,552) are fully immunized and 10.87% of them (277,908) were partially immunized. Total (registered) cases: 37,350; total (registered) active cases: 15,227; total (registered) deaths: 6,054 (plus unreported cases).

Due to a dramatic increase in COVID-19 cases, as of July 30, 2021, all seven of Arkansas's national park service sites enforced mask mandates. Regardless of vaccination status, masks are required in all federal buildings on National Park properties.

=== August 2021 ===
On August 9, 2021, Arkansas reported that 1,376 people were currently hospitalized with COVID-19, the highest number ever. Of these, 509 were in ICUs and 286 were on ventilators. Only 8 ICU beds in the entire state were available.

As of August 12, 2021, the only national park property to offer visitor's services (open visitor center, limited historical house tours) in the entire state is the President William Jefferson Clinton Birthplace Home National Historic Site. This is due to the dramatic rise in COVID-19 cases throughout the state.

== Government response ==
=== State government ===
On March 11, 2020, Governor Hutchinson declared a public health emergency in response to the first presumptive case in the state. On March 12, the governor ordered school closings in Saline, Jefferson, Pulaski, and Grant counties until March 30. On March 14, Governor Hutchinson activated the Arkansas National Guard to provide support with logistics, transportation, and other needs. All public schools were ordered to close beginning Tuesday, March 17. On March 17, Governor Hutchinson closed casinos for two weeks and loosened restrictions on claiming unemployment benefits for 30 days. On March 19, Hutchinson announced new measures to help limit the spread of the disease, including keeping public schools closed through April 17 and banning restaurants and bars from providing dine-in services. On March 23, the individual income tax filing deadline was pushed back until July 15, and barber shops, beauty and nail salons, massage parlors, and tattoo parlors were ordered to close on Tuesday, March 24. On April 3, state parks began to limit their available parking spaces and ended overnight stays. On April 6, the governor ordered public schools to close for the remainder of the school year.

Governor Hutchinson announced on July 9, 2020, that the start date for public schools would be changed from August 13 to August 24, giving school districts more time to plan for opening during the COVID-19 pandemic. According to Johnny Key, the Arkansas Secretary of Education, many districts would have been ready on August 13, but some districts had requested more time. Although Hutchinson expects to see positive cases in the public schools during the Fall semester, he was quoted as saying "we will just have to deal with it."

In April 2021, the Arkansas General Assembly passed a ban on mask mandates (SB 590), and Governor Hutchinson approved the ban. In August, Governor Hutchinson said he regretted the ban.

=== Local governments ===
==== Little Rock ====
On March 16, Little Rock mayor Frank Scott, Jr. announced a citywide curfew to keep residents from being outside from midnight to 5 a.m. beginning Wednesday, March 18. This did not apply to people traveling to and from work. Little Rock police officers would question people in public places, but not stop drivers. Additionally, homeless individuals would not be cited. On March 25, Scott extended the curfew to begin at 9 p.m. and end at 5 a.m. He also announced the introduction of a daytime curfew for minors from 9:00 a.m. to 2:30 p.m. that would be in effect from March 30 to April 17. Scott issued an executive order on June 25, 2020, that required the use of masks in public spaces where a social distance of 6 ft. could not be maintained.

==== Fayetteville ====
On March 16, the Fayetteville city council voted unanimously to grant the mayor emergency powers to regulate gatherings. The council also appropriated $3 million in emergency funds to address the pandemic locally. The Fayetteville City Council passed an ordinance on June 16, 2020, that required masks to be worn in most indoor public locations. The next day (June 17, 2020), Governor Hutchinson, during his daily press briefing, indicated that he opposed the Fayetteville mask ordinance, stating that he preferred that cities not take this action resulting in different cities having different ordinances. He stated that he would rather have city leaders encourage wearing of masks using education and leading by example.

== Impact ==
=== Education ===
==== K-12 schools ====
The governor initially ordered public schools to close by March 17, 2020, and mandated they would remain closed through the end of Spring Break the following week. Since the public health situation did not improve significantly over the next few weeks, on April 6 the governor ordered all public schools to remain closed for the remainder of the year with education taking place using online methods.

The governor and Ivy Pfeffer, the deputy education commissioner, introduced a plan on June 11 for onsite class education in the Fall. A document titled "Arkansas Ready for Learning" was released by the Arkansas Department of Education with guidance for schools as they planned for the school year. The document included suggestions for providing blended and online learning opportunities for students. After a delayed start date for the Fall semester for Arkansas public schools was announced by Governor Hutchinson (during the week of August 24), several groups objected to this plan. The Arkansas Public Policy Panel and Arkansas Citizens First Congress suggested that in-person instruction should be delayed until all school districts can meet guidelines suggested by the Centers for Disease Control and Prevention and the American Academy of Pediatrics. The Arkansas chapter of the American Academy of Pediatrics released a statement that indicated it could not support a return to statewide in-person instruction in Arkansas public schools during the month of August. The Little Rock Education Association requested that the school year start with at least two weeks of online education. These changes to the statewide plan were rejected by Governor Hutchinson during his July 21, 2020 news conference. As a response, Hutchinson highlighted a video interview of several pediatricians that advocated for a return to in-person classroom instruction.

==== Colleges and universities ====
Arkansas State University in Jonesboro announced on March 15 that beginning Tuesday, March 17, all in-person instructions would transition to all-online instructions for the remainder of the semester. The campus would remain open. Graduation ceremonies would be reevaluated as they got closer.

Southeast Arkansas College in Pine Bluff closed on March 11 after three students had been exposed to the original Pine Bluff patient.

Southern Arkansas University in Magnolia announced on March 12 that it was canceling all face-to-face classes scheduled for the week of March 16 through March 20, prior to the week of spring break. Course delivery would shift fully online beginning March 30 and continuing through the end of the semester. The campus was not closed and housing, dining, and other services would remain in operation.

The University of Arkansas at Fayetteville announced on March 12 that it was suspending all in-person classes immediately and would begin online courses starting Monday, March 16, and continue through the end of the semester. The campus was not closed and housing, dining, and other services would remain in operation. After a student tested positive for COVID-19 on March 24, the university announced it would be closing campus and gave students until April 3 to leave. On October 30, the university announced the cancellation of spring break 2021, instead opting to split the 5 day break into a series of shorter breaks to discourage travel.

The University of Arkansas at Little Rock announced on the afternoon of March 12, 2020 that in-person instruction would transition immediately to online instruction. The campus would remain open. Graduation ceremonies would be reevaluated as they got closer.

The University of Arkansas at Monticello (UAM) announced on March 17 that all instructions would move to an online setting through the end of the semester. The university remained open, including residence halls and food services. On March 19, UAM, based on a recommendation from the University of Arkansas board of trustees, announced that spring commencement exercises would be postponed and graduates would be invited to participate in the December 11 commencement ceremony.

=== Sports ===
The Arkansas Activities Association announced on March 12, 2020, via Twitter that all spring sports and activities would be suspended March 15–30, with plans to reassess at that time. In college sports, the National Collegiate Athletic Association cancelled all winter and spring tournaments, most notably the Division I men's and women's basketball tournaments, affecting colleges and universities statewide. On March 16, the National Junior College Athletic Association also canceled the remainder of the winter seasons as well as the spring seasons.

The National Collegiate Athletic Association (NCAA) allowed for voluntary athletics activities in football and basketball starting June 1, 2020. Some student athlete requirements, including a minimum football attendance for Football Bowl Subdivision members and playing a certain number of Division 1 games for other student athletes, were lifted so that students could comply with COVID-19 safety guidelines.

Governor Hutchinson announced on July 31, 2020, during his coronavirus briefing that football practice would be allowed with no-contact rules. Other sports like volleyball and cheerleading were also expected to resume. Governor Hutchinson asked Arkansas Activities Association to submit plans for contact sports to resume in fall 2020.

=== Religion ===
On January 28, 2021, the Arkansas House passed HB 1211 by a 75–10 vote, preventing the governor from restricting church services. Under this bill, the governor may not "enforce a health, safety, or occupancy requirement...that imposes a substantial burden on a religious organization" unless the governor proves that it is the "least restrictive" way to achieve a "compelling governmental interest."

== Statistics ==
COVID-19 pandemic medical cases in Arkansas by county
County (Note: County where individuals with a positive case reside. Location of diagnosis and treatment may vary.)	Cases (Note: Reported confirmed and probable cases. Actual case numbers are probably higher.)	Deaths	Population (Note: July 2019 population estimate from "U.S. Census Bureau Quick Facts: Arkansas". United States Census Bureau.)	Cases / 100k
75 / 75	1,040,155	13,429	3,017,804	34,467.3
Arkansas	7,309	99	17,486	41,799.2
Ashley	6,600	85	19,657	33,575.8
Baxter	11,633	286	41,932	27,742.5
Benton	83,639	1,048	279,141	29,963.0
Boone	12,167	208	37,432	32,504.3
Bradley	3,800	59	10,763	35,306.1
Calhoun	1,284	15	5,189	24,744.7
Carroll	7,833	125	28,380	27,600.4
Chicot	3,189	66	10,118	31,518.1
Clark	6,650	94	22,320	29,793.9
Clay	5,508	108	14,551	37,853.1
Cleburne	8,454	150	24,919	33,925.9
Cleveland	2,816	43	7,956	35,394.7
Columbia	7,437	111	23,457	31,704.8
Conway	7,321	89	20,846	35,119.4
Craighead	51,395	400	110,332	46,582.1
Crawford	19,819	298	63,257	31,330.9
Crittenden	17,551	248	47,955	36,598.9
Cross	6,202	107	16,419	37,773.3
Dallas	2,249	44	7,009	32,087.3
Desha	3,834	46	11,361	33,747.0
Drew	5,905	86	18,219	32,411.2
Faulkner	45,909	377	126,007	36,433.7
Franklin	4,936	86	17,715	27,863.4
Fulton	3,413	106	12,477	27,354.3
Garland	28,829	582	99,386	29,007.1
Grant	5,674	68	18,265	31,064.9
Greene	21,168	205	45,325	46,702.7
Hempstead	6,128	84	21,532	28,460.0
Hot Spring	13,711	163	33,771	40,599.9
Howard	4,918	65	13,202	37,251.9
Independence	13,829	237	37,825	36,560.5
Izard	5,007	82	13,629	36,737.8
Jackson	7,686	80	16,719	45,971.6
Jefferson	23,191	326	66,824	34,704.6
Johnson	8,835	109	26,578	33,241.8
Lafayette	1,650	31	6,624	24,909.4
Lawrence	7,082	93	16,406	43,167.1
Lee	3,445	68	8,857	38,895.8
Lincoln	5,599	72	13,024	42,989.9
Little River	4,164	112	12,259	33,966.9
Logan	6,438	96	21,466	29,991.6
Lonoke	25,545	278	73,309	34,845.7
Madison	5,241	69	16,576	31,618.0
Marion	4,438	103	16,694	26,584.4
Miller	12,501	213	43,257	28,899.4
Mississippi	17,779	243	40,651	43,735.7
Monroe	2,417	41	6,701	36,069.2
Montgomery	1,929	68	8,986	21,466.7
Nevada	2,967	49	8,252	35,954.9
Newton	2,175	54	7,753	28,053.7
Ouachita	7,271	134	23,382	31,096.6
Perry	3,206	43	10,455	30,664.8
Phillips	6,106	111	17,782	34,338.1
Pike	3,111	50	10,718	29,025.9
Poinsett	10,939	144	23,528	46,493.5
Polk	4,838	165	19,964	24,233.6
Pope	22,215	232	64,072	34,671.9
Prairie	2,612	49	8,062	32,398.9
Pulaski	135,720	1,358	391,911	34,630.3
Randolph	7,037	112	17,958	39,185.9
Saline	40,568	416	122,437	33,133.8
Scott	3,265	50	10,281	31,757.6
Searcy	2,814	54	7,881	35,706.1
Sebastian	41,892	616	127,827	32,772.4
Sevier	7,517	84	17,007	44,199.4
Sharp	6,209	128	17,442	35,598.0
St. Francis	8,918	119	24,994	35,680.6
Stone	4,100	83	12,506	32,784.3
Union	12,248	214	38,682	31,663.3
Van Buren	4,639	69	16,545	28,038.7
Washington	86,082	716	239,187	35,989.4
White	29,304	352	78,753	37,210.0
Woodruff	2,416	34	6,320	38,227.8
Yell	7,929	121	21,341	37,153.8
Updated February 13, 2024; Data is publicly reported by Arkansas Department of Health

== See also ==
- Timeline of the COVID-19 pandemic in the United States
- COVID-19 pandemic in the United States – for impact on the country
- COVID-19 pandemic – for impact on other countries
