= Dale Bumpers =

American politician (1925–2016)

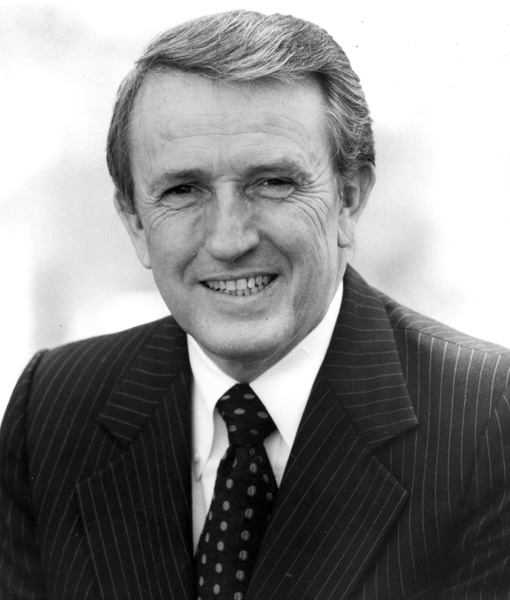
- Official portrait

United States Senator from Arkansas
- In office January 3, 1975 – January 3, 1999
- Preceded by: J. William Fulbright
- Succeeded by: Blanche Lincoln

38th Governor of Arkansas
- In office January 12, 1971 – January 3, 1975
- Lieutenant: Bob Riley
- Preceded by: Winthrop Rockefeller
- Succeeded by: Bob C. Riley (acting)

Personal details
- Born: Dale Leon Bumpers; August 12, 1925 Charleston, Arkansas, U.S.
- Died: January 1, 2016 (aged 90) Little Rock, Arkansas, U.S.
- Resting place: Columbarium of the First United Methodist Church, Charleston, Arkansas
- Party: Democratic
- Spouse: Betty Lou Flanagan (m. 1949)
- Children: 3
- Education: University of Arkansas (BA); Northwestern University (JD)

Military service
- Allegiance: United States
- Branch/service: United States Marine Corps
- Years of service: 1943–1946
- Dale Bumpers's voice Bumpers highlights risks of the Strategic Defense Initiative after the Iran Air Flight 655 shootdown Recorded September 22, 1988

Dale Leon Bumpers (August 12, 1925 – January 1, 2016) was an American lawyer and politician who served as the 38th governor of Arkansas (1971–1975) and in the United States Senate (1975–1999). He was a member of the Democratic Party. He was counsel at the Washington office of law firm Arent Fox LLP, where his clients included Riceland Foods and the University of Arkansas for Medical Sciences.

== Background ==
Bumpers was born August 12, 1925, in Charleston in Franklin County, in west central Arkansas, near the larger city of Fort Smith, the son of William Rufus Bumpers, who served in the Arkansas House of Representatives in the early 1930s, and the former Lattie Jones (1889–1949). Bumpers's brother, Raymond J. Bumpers, died of dysentery. Another older brother, Carroll Bumpers, was born in 1921. He also had a sister named Margaret. Bumpers's parents died five days apart in March 1949 of injuries sustained in an automobile accident; the couple are interred at Nixon Cemetery in Franklin County.

Bumpers attended public schools and the University of Arkansas at Fayetteville. He served in the United States Marine Corps from 1943 to 1946 during World War II. Bumpers graduated from Northwestern University Law School in Chicago, in 1951. From his time in Illinois, he became a great admirer of Adlai Stevenson, II, the Democratic presidential candidate in 1952 and 1956. Bumpers was admitted to the Arkansas bar in 1952 and began practicing law in his hometown that same year. He was from 1952 to 1970 the Charleston city attorney. While serving as city attorney, he convinced the school board to accept the Brown v. Board of Education ruling integrating public schools. Charleston was the first School District in the former Confederate South to fully integrate, an accomplishment that Bumpers was very proud of. He served as special justice of the Arkansas Supreme Court in 1968.

Bumpers lost his 1962 bid for the same state House seat once represented by his father, who had wanted to run for the United States House of Representatives but could not amass the funding to do so.

== Governor of Arkansas (1971-1975) ==
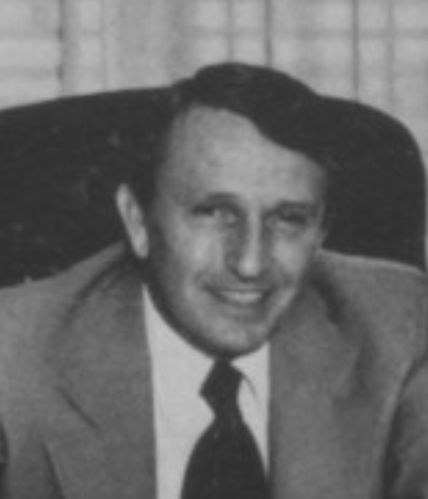
Bumpers as governor

Bumpers was virtually unknown when he announced his campaign for governor in 1970. However, his oratorical skills, personal charm, and outsider image put him in a runoff election for the Democratic nomination with former governor Orval Faubus. Bumpers defeated Faubus in the runoff, then easily defeated the incumbent Republican governor Winthrop Rockefeller in November. Bumpers was often described as a new kind of Southern Democrat who would bring reform to his state and the Democratic Party. His victory over Rockefeller ushered in a new era of youthful reform-minded governors, including two of his successors, David Pryor (who would later serve alongside Bumpers in the Senate) and future U.S. President Bill Clinton.

Dan Durning reports that Bumpers' foremost objective was to streamline the state government by reducing the number of agencies under his office. Bumpers accomplished this by reassigning 60 major agencies to 13 cabinet-level departments, which enhanced his decision-making power and implementation capacity. Unlike Rockefeller, who could not overcome special interest groups, Bumpers achieved this reorganization with remarkable success. The momentum propelled his substantive program. Bumpers spearheaded legislative reforms to create a more progressive tax system; top rates moved from 5% to 7%. This significantly boosted state revenues as the state industrialized and generated well-paid employees and executives. He utilized the additional revenue to increase teacher salaries and improve schools, which helped him in a major voting bloc. Bumpers opposed sales tax increases, because they were regressive. Despite requiring a 3/4 majority to pass both houses, the tax measures passed, leaving a lasting legacy. Other notable legislative achievements included a home rule law, the creation of a consumer protection division, repeal of some liquor laws, and upgrades to prison facilities. In a special session in 1972, significant programs were approved to upgrade county social services for the elderly, the handicapped, and the mentally disabled. Though some of Bumpers' initiatives failed, such as the proposed limitation on campaign expenditures, his overall success energized his statewide coalition for his successful re-election campaign in 1972.

According to Dan Durning's account, Bumpers succeeded in achieving more reforms during the 1973 General Assembly, with a particular focus on education. The reforms included the establishment of a state-supported kindergarten program, provision of free textbooks for high school students, increased support for the education of children with disabilities, salary hikes and better retirement benefits for teachers, a major construction program for state colleges and universities, and encouragement of community college programs by extending state coverage of operational costs. Nonetheless, Bumpers' proposals to allocate $10 million for the purchase of wilderness and scenic lands, and to approve the Equal Rights Amendment for women, were both turned down by the legislature.

Dan Durning argues that Bumpers' legislative proposals achieved remarkable success due to various factors. First, Bumpers enjoyed strong public support as he had defeated the disliked Republican governor Winthrop Rockefeller. Secondly, the newly elected general assembly in 1971 was more open to change than previous ones, owing to new members especially from cities, and the decline of the old guard men from rural counties. Thirdly, Bumpers' striking ability to use personal persuasion helped him establish favorable relationships with key players in the political establishment. Finally, Bumpers' independence from any special interest groups allowed him to pursue his own agenda without any obligations.

== U.S. Senate (1975-1999) ==
=== Elections ===
Bumpers was elected to the United States Senate in 1974. He unseated the long-term incumbent J. William Fulbright in the Democratic primary by a wide margin and then faced the Republican banker John Harris Jones. Jones accused Bumpers of excessive spending as governor, citing the construction of a $186 million state office complex. Bumpers not only ignored Jones but instead campaigned mostly for the young Democrat Bill Clinton, who failed in that heavily Democratic year to unseat Republican U.S. Representative John Paul Hammerschmidt in Arkansas's 3rd congressional district. Bumpers polled 461,056 votes (84.9%) to Jones's 82,026 (15.1%), the weakest Republican showing since Fulbright won in 1944.

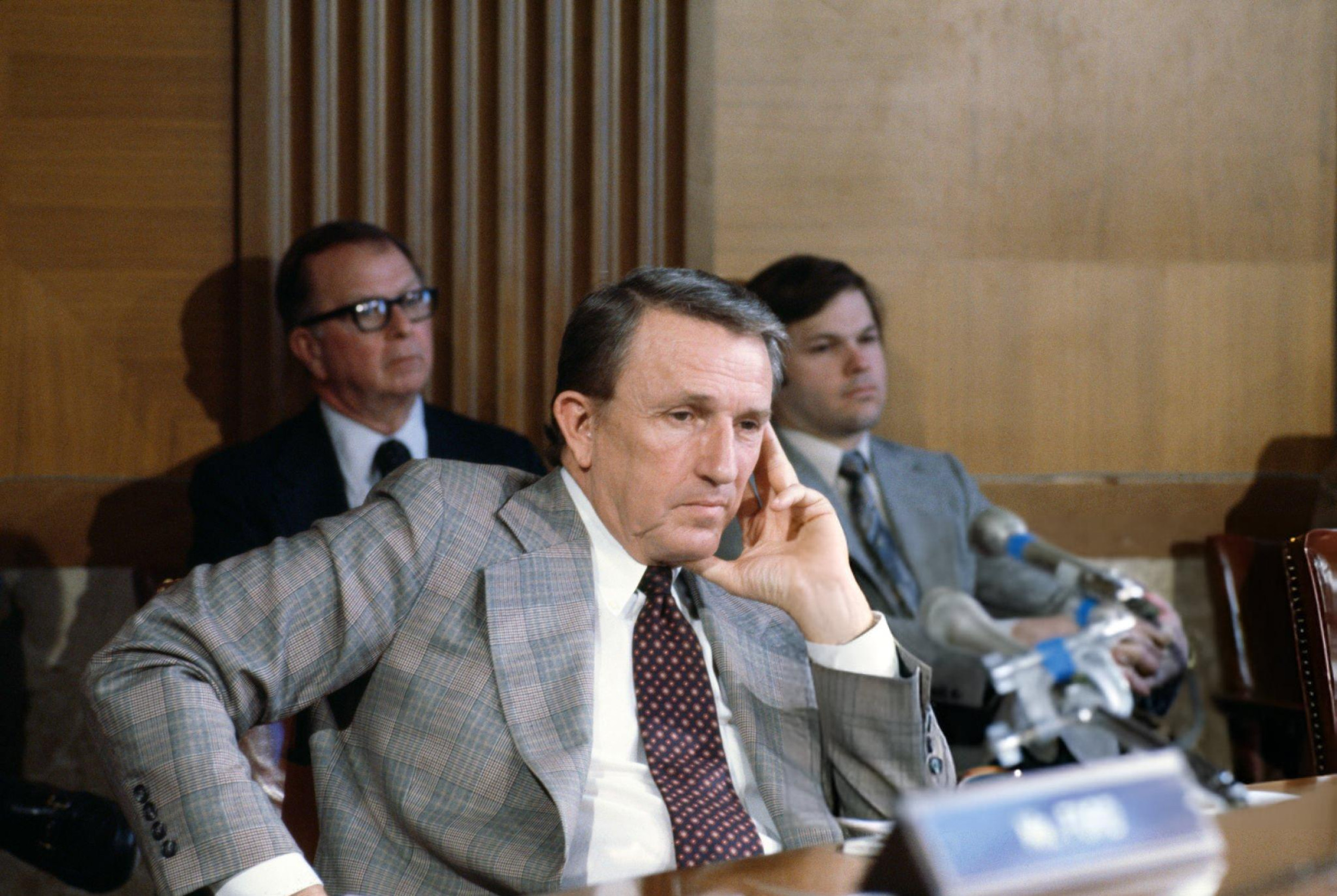
Bumpers in 1979

Time magazine wrote that "many to their sorrow have had trouble taking Bumpers seriously ... Dandy Dale, the man with one speech, a shoeshine, and a smile."

In 1980, Bumpers comfortably survived, 477,905 votes (59.1%) to 330,576 (40.9%), the Ronald Reagan victory in Arkansas by defeating the Republican candidate, William P. "Bill" Clark (born 1943), a Little Rock investment banker who filed for the Senate only one hour prior to the deadline (this William Clark is not related to the Reagan confidante William P. Clark Jr. [1931–2013]). In his unsuccessful 1976 race as a Democrat for Arkansas's 2nd congressional district seat, "Bill" Clark had passed out twenty thousand Clark candy bars but received fewer votes and was saddled with an unpaid campaign debt exceeding $30,000. Clark accused Bumpers of being "fuzzy on the issues" and challenged Bumpers's support for gasoline rationing during the energy crisis. Clark criticized Bumpers for having voted against defense appropriations twenty-three times between 1975 and 1978 and noted, "Only this year [when seeking reelection] he has voted for a couple of defense items." Clark questioned Bumpers's opposition to school prayer and support for the Panama Canal Treaties of 1978, an issue which Reagan had used against President Jimmy Carter as well. Clark further claimed that Bumpers had derided citizens of Newton County, a frequent Republican stronghold in Arkansas, as "stupid hill people". Newton County in turn cast 57.2 percent of its votes for Clark, who prevailed in twelve of the state's seventy-five counties, mostly those in the northwestern section of the state. Clark also carried Bumpers's home county of Franklin. The Republican hopeful asked voters, "If Dale Bumpers doesn't vote for you, why should you vote for him?"

Unlike Bumpers, Bill Clinton lost in the Reagan electoral vote landslide, temporarily sidelined by the Republican Frank D. White. In 1986, Bumpers defeated his Republican opponent, later U.S. Representative for Arkansas's 3rd congressional district and Governor Asa Hutchinson. In 1992, after besting State Auditor Julia Hughes Jones with 64 percent of the vote in the Democratic primary, he defeated future governor Mike Huckabee in the general election. The next year, Jones switched to the GOP and unsuccessfully ran for secretary of state in 1994. In 1998, when Bumpers retired, the Democratic choice, former U. S. Representative Blanche Lincoln of Arkansas's 1st congressional district, comfortably defeated the Republican nominee, Fay Boozman, a state senator who was later the Arkansas Department of Health director under Governor Huckabee.

=== Tenure ===
Bumpers was elected to the U.S. Senate four times, beginning with his huge victory over Fulbright, the veteran chairman of the Senate Foreign Relations Committee. Bumpers chaired the Senate Small Business and Entrepreneurship Committee from 1987 until 1995, when the Republicans took control of the Senate for a dozen years following the 1994 elections. Bumpers served as ranking minority member of the Senate Energy and Natural Resources Committee from 1997 until his retirement in 1999. In the Senate, Bumpers was known for his oratorical skills and for his prodigious respect for the U.S. Constitution. He never supported any constitutional amendment.

Bumpers decided not to seek the Democratic presidential nomination in 1984 and 1988, despite support from many colleagues, including Senator Paul Simon of Illinois, who ultimately also contested the 1988 nomination won by Michael Dukakis. Initially named as one of Walter Mondale's top potential choices for his vice presidential running mate in 1984, he took his name out of the running early in the process.

Bumpers stated that his main reason for not running was fear of "a total disruption of the closeness my family has cherished." Many observers felt that Bumpers perhaps lacked the obsessive ambition required of a presidential candidate, especially one who would have started out the process with low name identification. Another factor often mentioned was Bumpers's key vote in killing labor law reform in 1978, a vote that angered organized labor and had clearly not been forgotten by labor leaders nearly a decade later.

=== Clinton impeachment ===
After his retirement from the Senate, Bumpers, a self-declared close friend of President Clinton, acted as defense attorney during Clinton's impeachment trial. He gave an impassioned closing argument during the Senate trial.

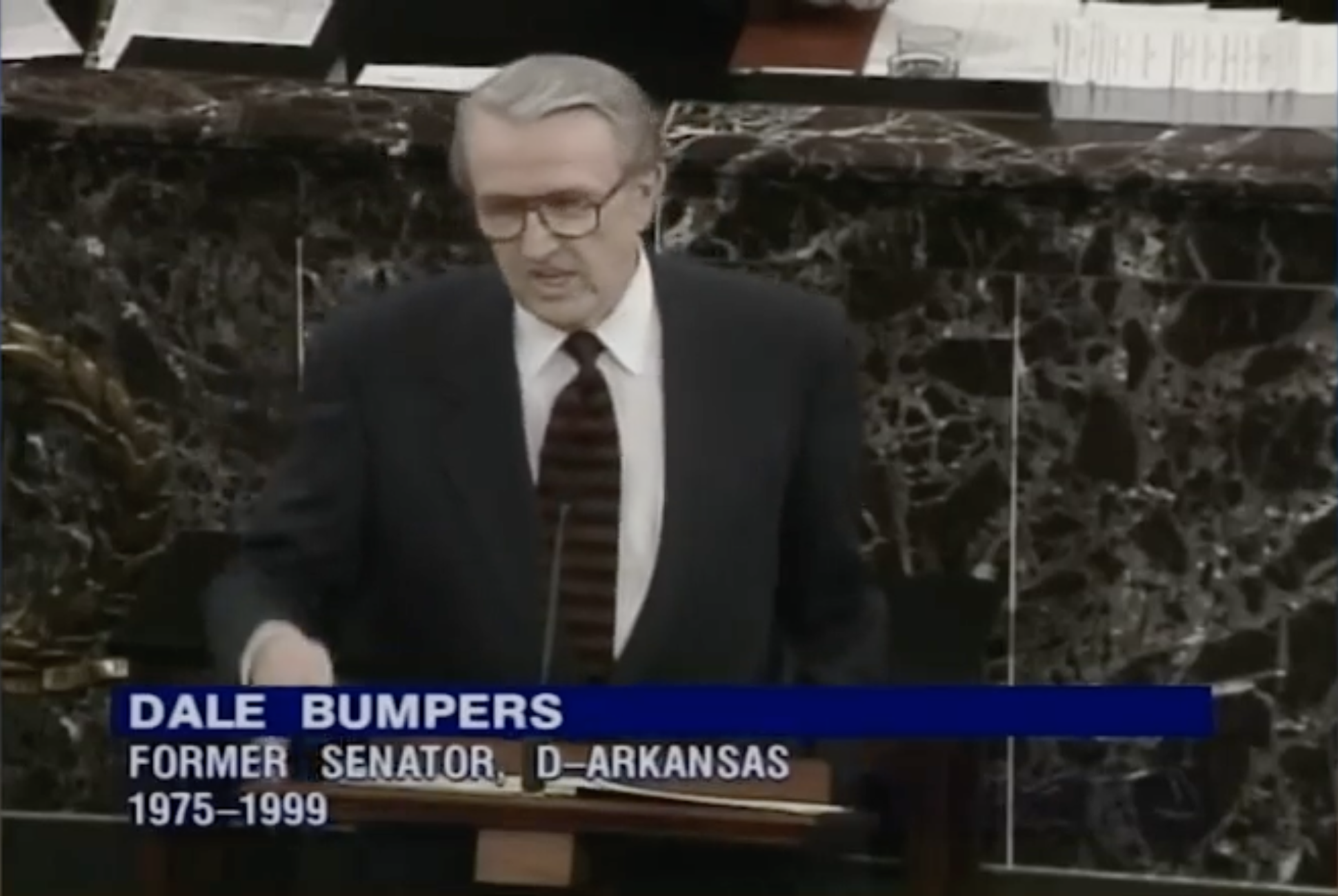
Bumpers arguing before the Senate during the Clinton impeachment trial

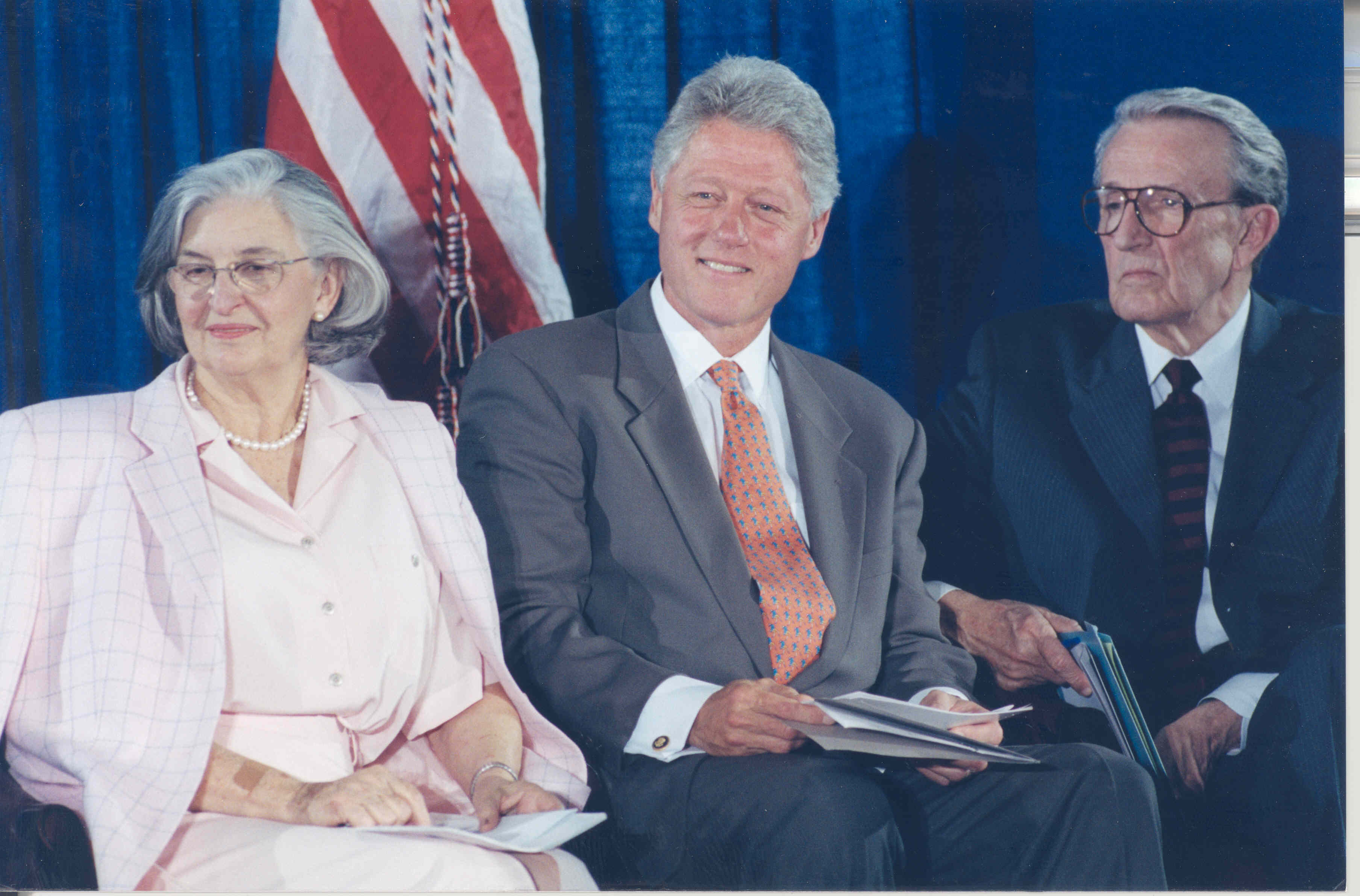
Bumpers with his wife Betty and President Bill Clinton, 1999

Quotes from the closing argument of the White House presentation, January 21, 1999:

H. L. Mencken said one time, "When you hear somebody say, 'This is not about money' – it's about money." And when you hear somebody say, "This is not about sex" – it's about sex.

… Nobody has suggested that Bill Clinton committed a political crime against the state. So, colleagues, if you honor the Constitution, you must look at the history of the Constitution and how we got to the impeachment clause. And if you do that and you do that honestly according to the oath you took, you cannot – you can censure Bill Clinton, you can hand him over to the prosecutor for him to be prosecuted, but you cannot convict him. And you cannot indulge yourselves the luxury or the right to ignore this history. …

The American people are now and for some time have been asking to be allowed a good night's sleep. They're asking for an end to this nightmare. It is a legitimate request.

== Honors ==
In 1995, the University of Arkansas founded the Dale Bumpers College of Agricultural, Food and Life Sciences in his honor.

In 2014, the White River National Wildlife Refuge in Arkansas was renamed "Dale Bumpers White River National Wildlife Refuge". At a dedication ceremony, Daniel M. Ashe, director of the United States Fish and Wildlife Service, said:

The Service is proud to recognize the many contributions Senator Bumpers has made to give many future generations the same opportunity to enjoy Arkansas' natural beauty as we have had. He is a giant among conservationists and a visionary who followed an unconventional path to set aside some of Arkansas' last wild places. It is fitting that he will be forever linked with the White River.

== Causes ==
Bumpers and his wife Betty were both known for their dedication to the cause of childhood immunization. The Dale and Betty Bumpers Vaccine Research Center (VRC) at the National Institutes of Health was established by former president Clinton to facilitate research in vaccine development.

Early in his legal career, the Charleston School Board asked his advice on how it should respond to the Supreme Court decision in the 1954 case of Brown v. Board of Education of Topeka, Kansas, which found the segregation of public schools on the basis of race to be unconstitutional. Bumpers advised the school board to comply with the decision immediately. In July 1954, the board voted to desegregate its schools, and on August 23, 1954, the school year began with eleven African-American children attending schools in Charleston. This prompt action to desegregate public schools was rare: The Charleston School District was the first in the eleven states that comprised the former Confederacy to integrate their public schools following the Supreme Court decision.

Bumpers opposed constitutional amendments throughout his Senate tenure and was critical of his Republican colleague Jesse Helms for attempting that route to enact conservative policy proposals. However, Bumpers said that he worked well with Republican leaders Howard Baker and Bob Dole.

== Death ==
After a period of failing health, Bumpers died on January 1, 2016, at his home in Little Rock at the age of 90. He had Alzheimer's disease and had sustained a broken hip shortly before his death.

He would be cremated, with his inurnment taking place in the Columbarium of the First United Methodist Church in Charleston, Arkansas.

== Bumpers in fiction ==
In Jeffrey Archer's 1977 novel Shall We Tell the President?, Bumpers was elected as the Vice President of the United States in a ticket headed by Ted Kennedy, defeating Ronald Reagan during the 1984 election. In the 1986 revised edition of the novel, Archer replaced Kennedy with the fictional character of Florentyna Kane, and Bumpers with the real-life Senator Bill Bradley of New Jersey.

== Electoral history ==
1970 Arkansas gubernatorial election
Party	Candidate	%	Votes
D	Dale Bumpers	61.66%	375,648
R	Winthrop Rockefeller (incumbent)	32.41%	197,418
A	Walter L. Carruth	5.93%	36,132

1972 Arkansas gubernatorial election
Party	Candidate	%	Votes
D	Dale Bumpers (incumbent)	75.44%	488,892
R	Len E. Blaylock	24.56%	159,177

1974 United States Senate election in Arkansas
Party	Candidate	%	Votes
D	Dale Bumpers	84.90%	461,056
R	John H. Jones	15.10%	82,026

1980 United States Senate election in Arkansas
Party	Candidate	%	Votes
D	Dale Bumpers (incumbent)	59.09%	477,905
R	William Clark	40.87%	330,576

1986 United States Senate election in Arkansas
Party	Candidate	%	Votes
D	Dale Bumpers (incumbent)	62.28%	433,122
R	Asa Hutchinson	37.72%	262,313

1992 United States Senate election in Arkansas
Party	Candidate	%	Votes
D	Dale Bumpers (incumbent)	60.18%	553,635
R	Mike Huckabee	39.82%	366,373

== Books ==
- Bumpers, Dale (2003). The Best Lawyer in a One-Lawyer Town: A Memoir. New York: Random House. ISBN 0375505210.

== Citations ==
Party political offices
Preceded by Marion Crank	Democratic nominee for Governor of Arkansas; 1970, 1972	Succeeded by David Pryor
Preceded by Marvin Mandel	Chair of the Democratic Governors Association; 1972–1973	Succeeded by Wendell H. Ford
Preceded by J. William Fulbright	Democratic nominee for U.S. Senator from Arkansas (Class 3); 1974, 1980, 1986, 1992	Succeeded by Blanche Lincoln
Political offices
Preceded by Winthrop Rockefeller	Governor of Arkansas; 1971–1975	Succeeded by Bob Riley; Acting
U.S. Senate
Preceded by J. William Fulbright	United States Senator (Class 3) from Arkansas; 1975–1999; Served alongside: John L. McClellan, Kaneaster Hodges, David Pryor, Tim Hutchinson	Succeeded by Blanche Lincoln
Preceded by Lowell Weicker	Chair of the Senate Small Business Committee; 1987–1995	Succeeded by Kit Bond
Preceded by Larry Pressler	Ranking Member of the Senate Small Business Committee; 1995–1997	Succeeded by John Kerry
Preceded by J. Bennett Johnston	Ranking Member of the Senate Energy Committee; 1997–1999	Succeeded by Jeff Bingaman
