= Asa Hutchinson =

Governor of Arkansas from 2015 to 2023

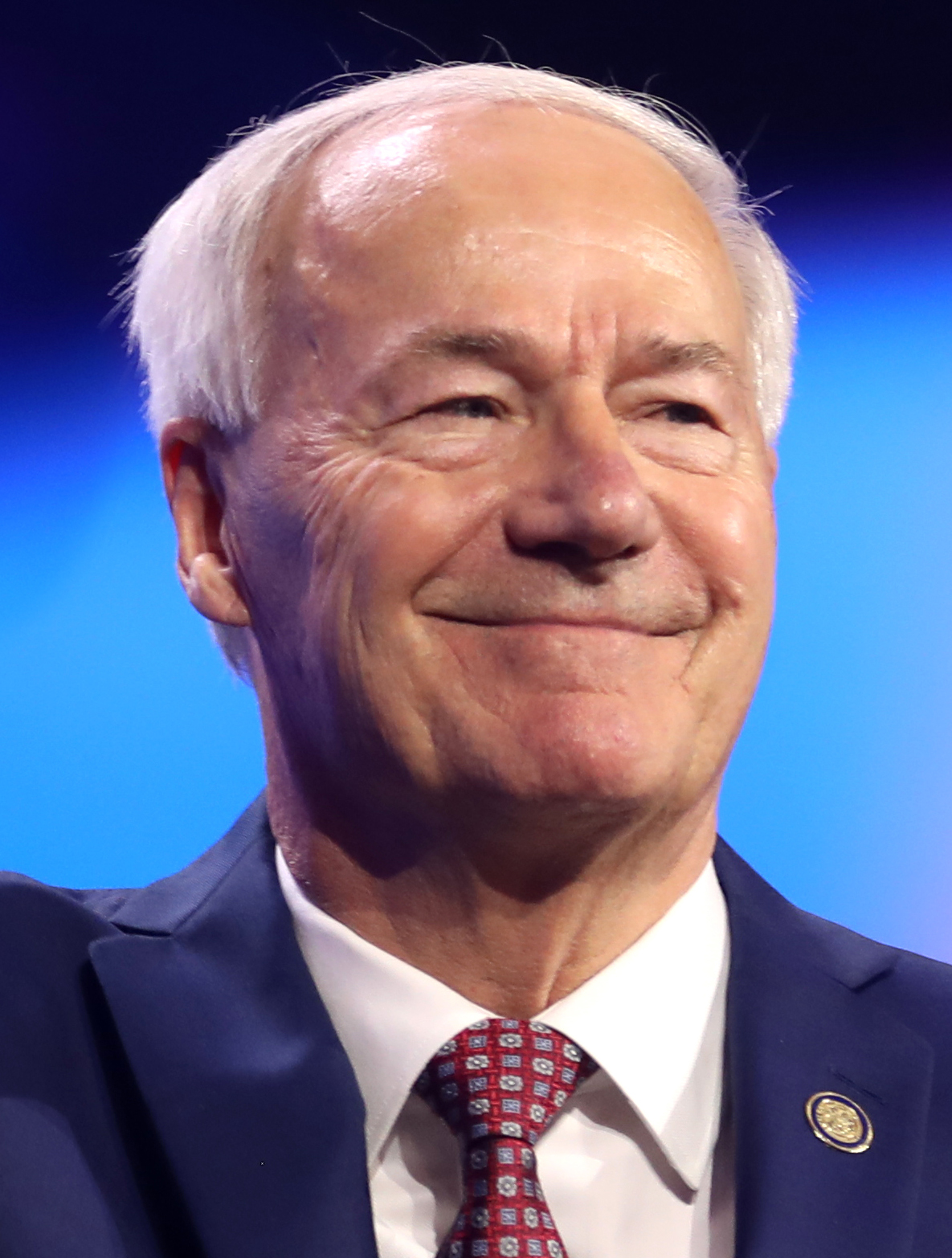
- Hutchinson in 2023

46th Governor of Arkansas
- In office January 13, 2015 – January 10, 2023
- Lieutenant: Tim Griffin
- Preceded by: Mike Beebe
- Succeeded by: Sarah Huckabee Sanders

Chair of the National Governors Association
- In office July 8, 2021 – July 15, 2022
- Preceded by: Andrew Cuomo
- Succeeded by: Phil Murphy

Under Secretary of Homeland Security for Border and Transportation Security
- In office January 23, 2003 – March 1, 2005
- President: George W. Bush
- Preceded by: Position established
- Succeeded by: Randy Beardsworth (acting)

8th Administrator of the Drug Enforcement Administration
- In office August 8, 2001 – January 23, 2003
- President: George W. Bush
- Deputy: John Brown
- Preceded by: William Simpkins (acting)
- Succeeded by: Karen Tandy

Member of the U.S. House of Representatives from Arkansas's 3rd district
- In office January 3, 1997 – August 6, 2001
- Preceded by: Tim Hutchinson
- Succeeded by: John Boozman

Chair of the Arkansas Republican Party
- In office January 1, 1991 – December 31, 1995 Serving with Sheffield Nelson (1991–1992)
- Preceded by: Ken Coon
- Succeeded by: Lloyd Stone

United States Attorney for the Western District of Arkansas
- In office September 1, 1982 – January 20, 1985
- President: Ronald Reagan
- Preceded by: Larry McCord
- Succeeded by: Michael Fitzhugh

Personal details
- Born: William Asa Hutchinson II; December 3, 1950 (age 75) Bentonville, Arkansas, U.S.
- Party: Republican
- Spouse: Susan Burrell (m. 1973)
- Children: 4
- Relatives: Tim Hutchinson (brother)
- Education: Bob Jones University (BA); University of Arkansas (JD)
- Website: Official website

William Asa Hutchinson II (/ˈeɪsə/, AY-sə; born December 3, 1950) is an American attorney, businessman, and politician who served as the 46th governor of Arkansas from 2015 to 2023. A member of the Republican Party, he previously served as a U.S. attorney, U.S. representative, and in two roles in the George W. Bush administration. He was a candidate for the 2024 Republican presidential nomination.

In 1982, President Ronald Reagan appointed Hutchinson to serve as the U.S. attorney for the Western District of Arkansas, which covers most of Fort Smith. In 1986, Hutchinson unsuccessfully challenged Democratic U.S. Senator Dale Bumpers, before losing a race for Attorney General of Arkansas to Winston Bryant four years later. He later successfully ran for the House of Representatives in 1996, representing Arkansas's 3rd congressional district until 2001, when president George W. Bush successfully nominated him as Administrator of the Drug Enforcement Administration. In 2003, Bush appointed Hutchinson as the under secretary for border and transportation security at the newly established Department of Homeland Security; Hutchinson retired from the Bush administration in 2005.

In 2006, Hutchinson was the Republican nominee for governor of Arkansas, but lost to Democratic nominee Mike Beebe, the state attorney general. In 2014, Hutchinson was again the Republican nominee for governor, this time defeating the Democratic nominee, former U.S. Representative Mike Ross. He was reelected in 2018 with nearly two-thirds of the vote. Due to term limits, he was barred from seeking reelection in 2022, and was succeeded by Sarah Huckabee Sanders.

From 2020 to 2021, Hutchinson served as vice chair of the National Governors Association. He succeeded Governor Andrew Cuomo of New York as chair of the organization for 2021–2022. In 2023 he announced his candidacy in the 2024 Republican Party presidential primaries. He suspended his campaign on January 16, 2024, after a poor performance in the Iowa caucuses. In April 2024, he joined Scripps News as a political contributor.

== Early life and legal career ==
Hutchinson was born in Bentonville, Arkansas, the son of Coral Virginia (Mount) Hutchinson (1912–1998) and John Malcolm Hutchinson Sr. (1907–1991). He earned his bachelor's degree in accounting from Bob Jones University in South Carolina in 1972 and received his J.D. from the University of Arkansas School of Law in 1975. He practiced law in Fort Smith for 21 years and handled more than 100 jury trials.

In 1982, President Ronald Reagan appointed Hutchinson U.S. attorney for the Western District of Arkansas. At age 31, Hutchinson was the nation's youngest U.S. attorney. He made national headlines after successfully prosecuting The Covenant, The Sword, and The Arm of the Lord (CSA), a white supremacist organization founded by polygamist James Ellison. The CSA forced a three-day armed standoff with local, state, and federal law enforcement. As U.S. attorney, Hutchinson personally negotiated a peaceful conclusion to the standoff.

== Early political career ==
=== Pre-Congress efforts ===
In 1986, Hutchinson ran against incumbent Democratic U.S. senator and former governor Dale Bumpers. It was a good year for Democrats, and Hutchinson fared worse than Bumpers's previous Senate challenger, Little Rock investment banker William P. "Bill" Clark. In 1990, Hutchinson ran against Winston Bryant for attorney general of Arkansas; he lost the race by a margin of 55–45%. Hutchinson then became co-chair, with Sheffield Nelson, of the Arkansas Republican Party, a position he held from 1991 through 1995, the last four years as full chair. He considered a rematch with Bumpers in 1992 before deferring to Mike Huckabee, who lost to Bumpers.

=== U.S. House of Representatives ===
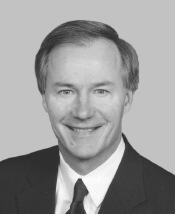
Asa Hutchinson's 105th Congress portrait

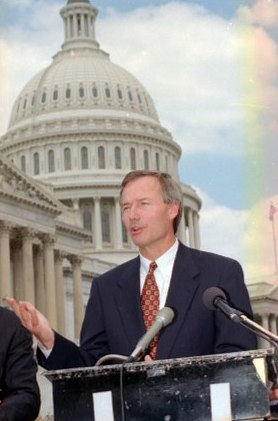
Hutchinson during a press conference on campaign finance reform in 1998

In 1992 Hutchinson's brother, Tim, was elected to Congress in Arkansas's 3rd congressional district, when veteran U.S. Representative John Paul Hammerschmidt retired. In 1996, when his brother decided not to run for a third term in the House in order to seek the open Senate seat caused by the retirement of David Pryor, Hutchinson ran for the seat and won.

Hutchinson, who had at first decided to run for an open seat in the Arkansas House of Representatives from Sebastian County defeated Ann Henry, a longtime friend of Bill and Hillary Clinton, in November 1996. Although Henry outspent Hutchinson during the campaign, the district's heavy Republican tilt and his brother Tim's presence atop the ballot helped Asa win with 52% of the vote. Tim Hutchinson also was elected to the U.S. Senate in 1996 and served one term, losing his reelection bid in 2002.

In 1998, Hutchinson was reelected to the House with far less difficulty, taking 81% of the vote against a third-party challenger. He was reelected unopposed in 2000. Hutchinson served as a house manager (prosecutor) in the impeachment trial of Bill Clinton.

In office, Hutchinson compiled a voting record as conservative as his brother's. He led efforts to crack down on illegal drugs, particularly methamphetamine. Hutchinson also served as one of the managers of the impeachment trial of President Bill Clinton in 1998. In 1999, Hutchinson was involved in the effort to reform campaign finance laws and offered an alternative proposal to the bill by Christopher Shays and Marty Meehan, which he opposed on the grounds that it "went too far" by attempting to ban television commercials by legal third-party organizations. Hutchinson did support John McCain's and Russ Feingold's Senate bill. Hutchinson unsuccessfully tried to modify the civil asset forfeiture reform bill that sought to prevent police abuse of its power to seize private property on mere suspicion of being linked to any criminal investigation. His amendment would allegedly have empowered the police to continue profiting from drug money.

=== Drug Enforcement Administration ===
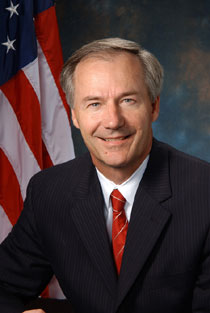
Hutchinson as Undersecretary for Border and Transportation Security

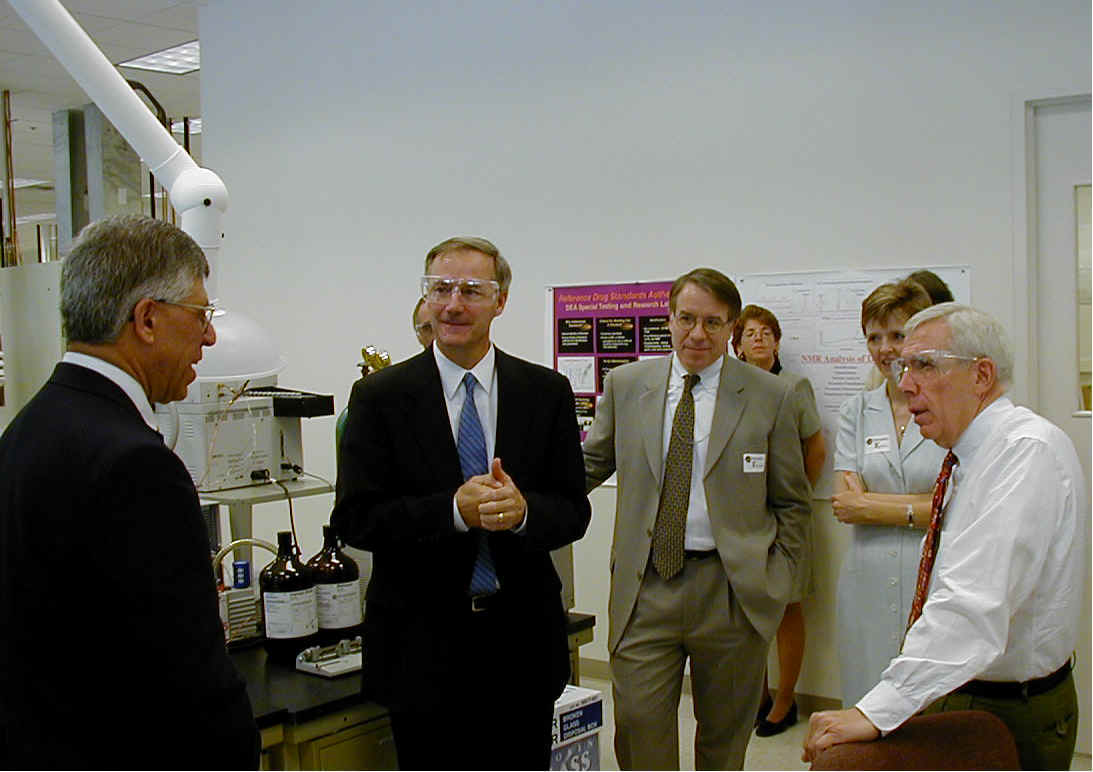
Hutchinson and U.S. Representative Frank Wolf tour a DEA drug testing facility in Northern Virginia in 2001

In 2001, at the beginning of the George W. Bush administration, Hutchinson was appointed Administrator of the Drug Enforcement Administration (DEA). He was confirmed by a 98–1 Senate vote.

=== Department of Homeland Security ===
After the September 11 attacks, Congress created the Department of Homeland Security (DHS). President Bush tapped Hutchinson to lead the Border and Transportation Security Directorate, a division of the DHS. The Senate confirmed Hutchinson by unanimous consent on January 23, 2003. Hutchinson left office as Undersecretary on March 1, 2005.

== Post-Bush administration ==
=== Business career ===
In early 2005, Hutchinson founded a consulting firm, Hutchinson Group, LLC, with partners Betty Guhman and Kirk Tompkins, in Little Rock, and accepted a contract for a one-year position with Venable LLP in Washington, D.C., as the chair of its Homeland Security practice. Hutchinson ended his contract with Venable LLP in March 2006 to focus on his gubernatorial campaign and his consulting firm in Little Rock. In January 2007, Hutchinson rejoined Venable.

In June 2006, the Arkansas Democrat-Gazette reported that Hutchinson's $2,800 investment in Fortress America Acquisition Corporation, a company that Hutchinson was advising, was worth over $1 million after the company's initial public offering. The news story noted that Hutchinson was unable to touch his stock for another two years. The six founding shareholders in Fortress America, in addition to Hutchinson, included former U.S. Representative Tom McMillen, former U.S. Senator Don Nickles, and a private-equity firm that had former CIA Director James Woolsey among its partners.

On May 4, 2006, Hutchinson had filed a financial disclosure form he was required to submit as a candidate for governor. The form did not list his 200,000 shares in Fortress America, which were trading at about $5 per share. "Just totally an oversight", Hutchinson said when questioned by the media in June. He filed an amended report the next day to correct the error.

=== Political activities ===
Hutchinson agreed to serve on The Constitution Project's Guantanamo Task Force in December 2010. He told the Associated Press he agreed to join the task force because he believed it was "something important for our national security and our war on terrorism."

In the wake of the shooting at Sandy Hook Elementary School, the National Rifle Association of America (NRA) assembled a group with backgrounds in homeland security, law enforcement training, and school safety to review school security standards in select areas of the country. Led by Hutchinson, the group's stated goal was to produce a comprehensive plan to address the safety of children in schools and to prevent such shootings in the future. On April 2, 2013, he presented the National School Shield plan during a news conference at the National Press Club.

== Governor of Arkansas ==
=== 2006 election ===
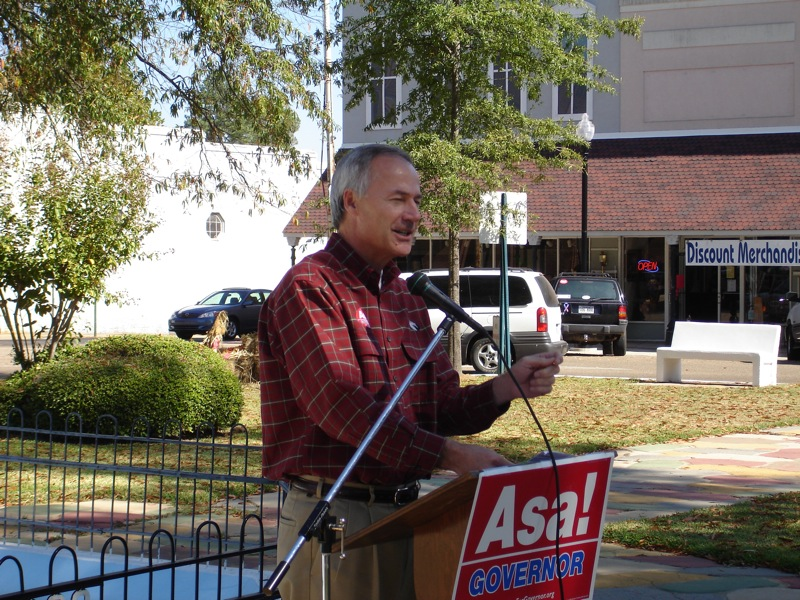
Hutchinson campaigning for governor in 2006

Shortly after returning to Arkansas, Hutchinson announced his candidacy for governor in 2006. Initially, he was to face three-term Lieutenant Governor Winthrop Paul Rockefeller, who was favored in most pre-election polls, in the Republican primary. But Rockefeller's withdrawal and death from a blood disorder in early 2006 led to Hutchinson winning the primary. In the general election, he lost to the Democratic nominee, then-Arkansas Attorney General Mike Beebe.

=== 2014 election ===
Hutchinson was the Republican nominee for governor of Arkansas in 2014. He was supported by House Speaker Davy Carter. On November 4, 2014, after defeating Tea Party-backed Curtis Coleman in the Republican primary, he defeated the Democratic nominee, Mike Ross, in the general election with 55% of the vote, the best showing for a Republican in an open-seat gubernatorial race since the end of Reconstruction. His victory also gave the GOP complete control of state government for the first time since the end of Reconstruction.

=== 2018 election ===
Hutchinson was reelected on November 6, 2018, in a landslide, taking over 65% of the vote and carrying all but eight counties. In a bad year for the GOP nationally, Hutchinson garnered the largest margin of victory for a Republican candidate in Arkansas history.

=== Tenure ===
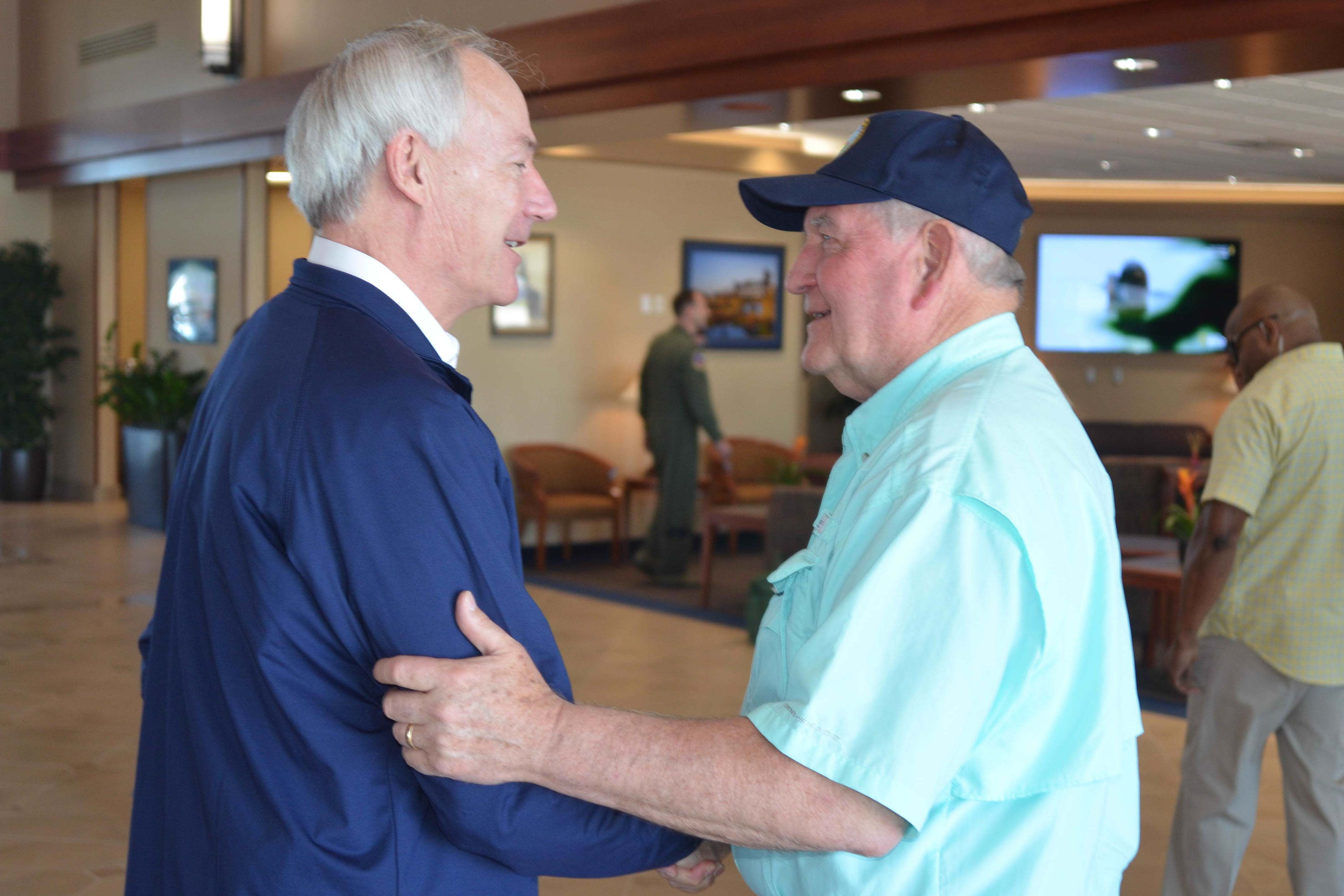
Hutchinson greeting Secretary of Agriculture Sonny Perdue in 2017

Hutchinson took office as governor on January 13, 2015.

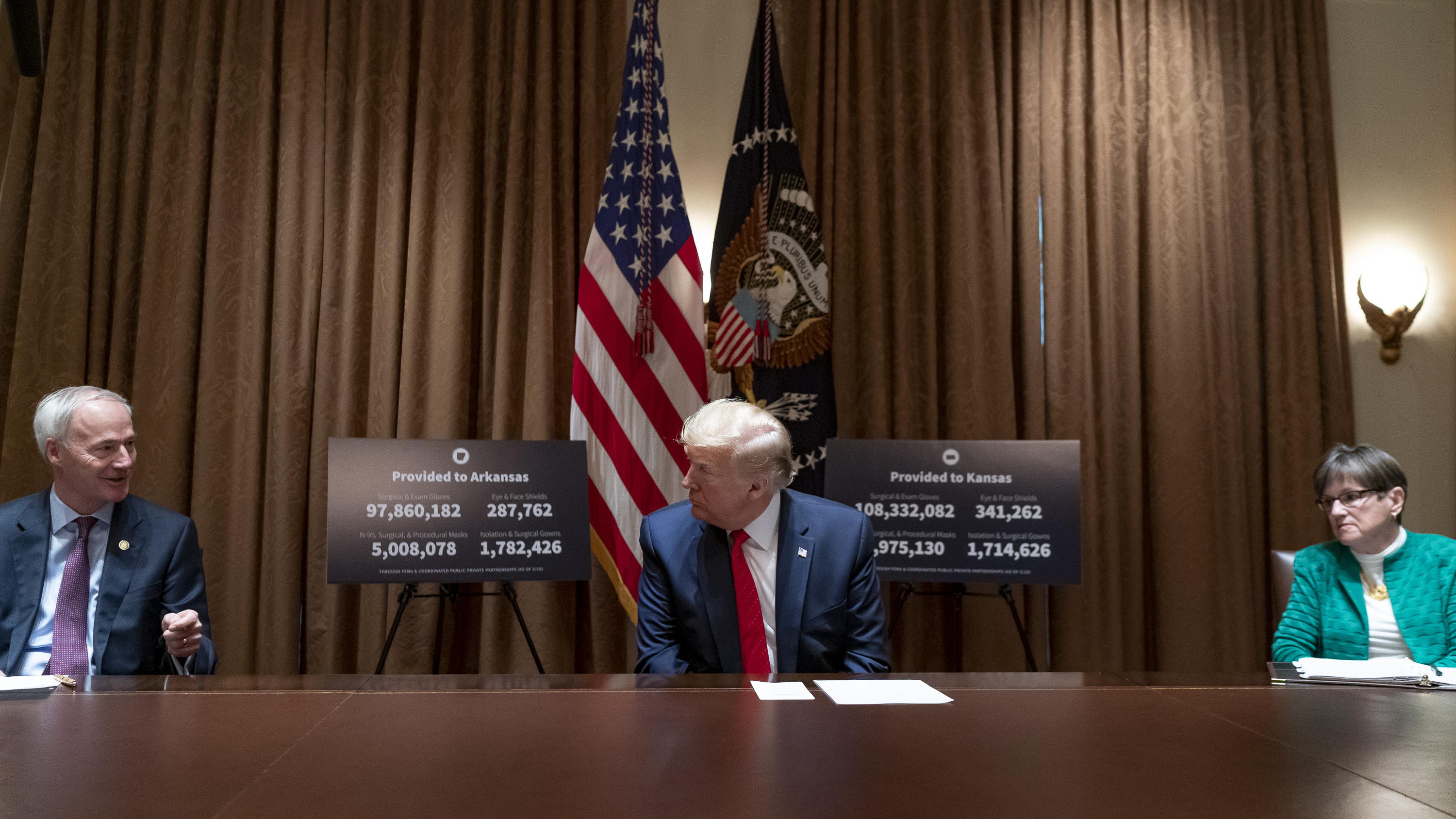
Hutchinson meeting with President Donald Trump and Laura Kelly in 2020

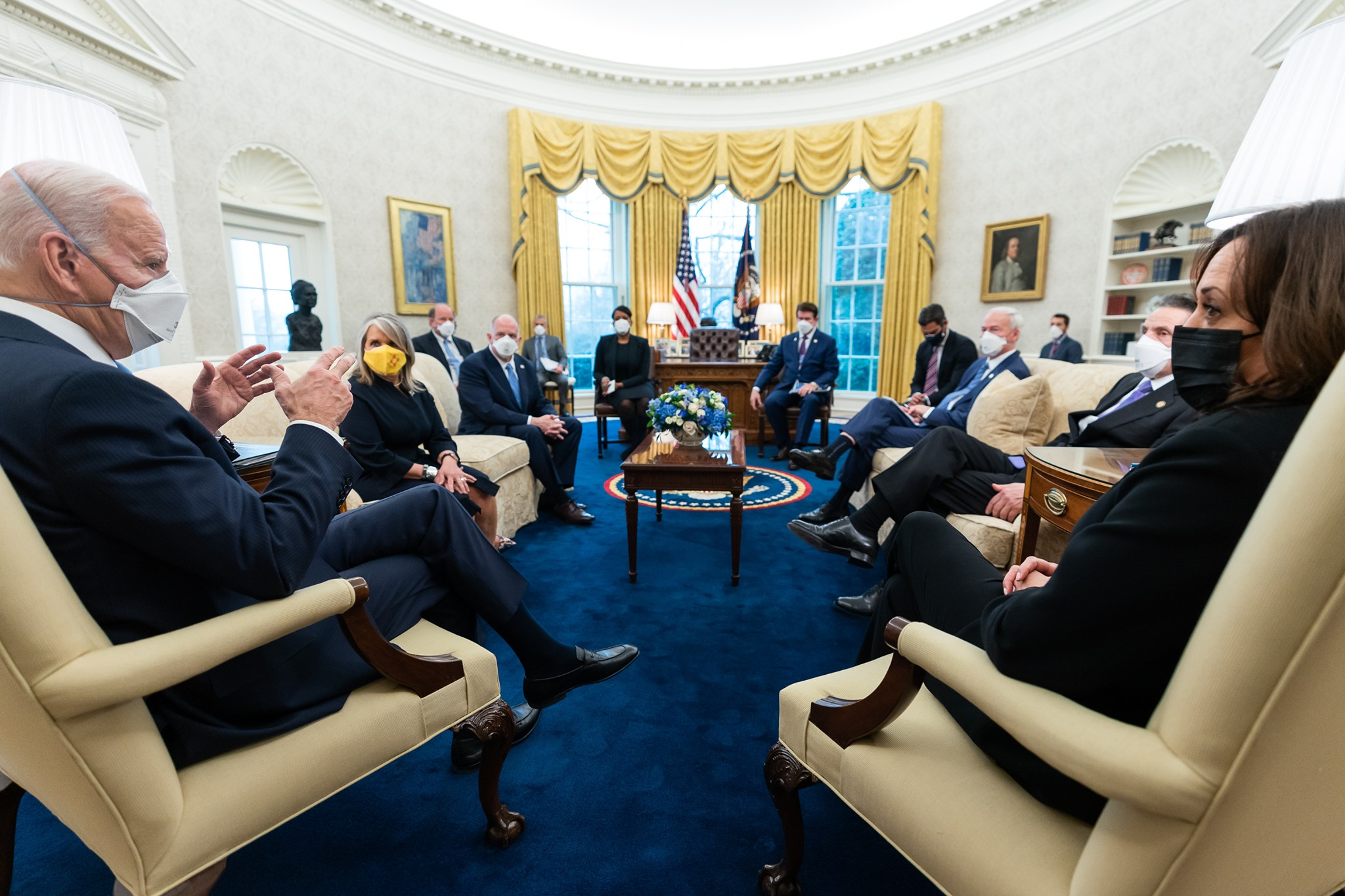
Hutchinson meeting with President Joe Biden, Vice President Kamala Harris and a bipartisan group of governors and mayors in 2021

On November 16, 2015, Hutchinson said that he would block all Syrian refugees from entering the state in response to the November 2015 Paris attacks.

Under Hutchinson, Arkansas resumed executions in 2017 after having executed no one since 2005. In 2021, DNA testing on the murder weapon and a bloody shirt at the scene of the crime did not match Ledell Lee, who was convicted and executed for murder. Hutchinson defended Lee's execution, saying, "the DNA findings released today do not present any conclusive evidence to undermine [Lee's guilty verdict]."

In March 2017, Hutchinson signed Act 710 into law which prohibits Arkansas agencies from investing in or contracting with companies unless they sign a pledge not to boycott Israel or offer a 20% cut in compensation in lieu of signing such a pledge.

As governor, Hutchinson implemented work requirements for Medicaid enrollees. As a result, by December 2018, almost 17,000 Arkansans had lost their Medicaid health insurance, with reapplication available in the new calendar year.

In February 2019, Hutchinson signed a bill into law that would criminalize abortion in the event Roe v. Wade is overturned. On March 9, 2021, he signed SB6, a near-total abortion bill, into law. He said that the bill was intended "to set the stage for the Supreme Court overturning current case law. I would have preferred the legislation to include the exceptions for rape and incest, which has been my consistent view, and such exceptions would increase the chances for a review by the U.S. Supreme Court." On May 8, 2022, Hutchinson responded to comments by Senate Minority Leader Mitch McConnell about potential passage of a future federal law prohibiting abortions nationwide: "If the court reverses Roe v. Wade, they're saying that the Constitution does not provide that, which returns it to the states. And that's where the vigorous debate is going to be. That is where we're going to face a lot of concerns on the compassion side."

In 2015, Hutchinson signed into law legislation that would prohibit localities from extending civil rights protections to LGBT individuals. At the time, Arkansas was among states that allowed discrimination in the workplace, housing and business on the basis of gender identity and sexual orientation. In March 2021, Hutchinson signed into law legislation that would allow doctors to refuse non-emergency medical treatment to LGBT people based on moral objection. In April 2021, he vetoed a bill that would make it illegal for transgender minors to receive gender-affirming medication or surgery, calling it "a vast government overreach". The state legislature later overrode his veto.

In August 2021, Hutchinson signed bills into law that prohibited businesses and government facilities from requiring proof of COVID-19 vaccination for staff and customers to enter facilities. While Arkansas was experiencing a wave of COVID-19 cases, he also signed a bill into law that prohibited state and local officials from enacting mask mandates. He later said he regretted doing so. In December 2021, Hutchinson praised President Joe Biden's COVID policies and thanked Biden for his efforts to "get the vaccinations out" and "depoliticizing" the federal COVID response. In January 2022, Hutchinson encouraged large businesses to not comply with the Biden administration's vaccine requirements.

Hutchinson demanded that Republicans who tried to overturn the 2020 presidential election and spread Donald Trump's "Big Lie" about mass voter fraud not be put in positions of leadership. He also accused Trump of dividing the party and said his election conspiracies were a "recipe for disaster". On February 5, 2022, Hutchinson and U.S. senator Lisa Murkowski condemned the Republican National Committee's censure of representatives Adam Kinzinger and Liz Cheney for their support of and participation on the House Select Committee tasked with investigating the January 6 United States Capitol attack.

== Post-gubernatorial career ==
=== 2024 presidential campaign ===
In May 2022, Hutchinson said he would consider running for president in 2024 even if former President Donald Trump ran again and that Trump's candidacy would not be a factor in his decision. He added, "I think he did a lot of good things for our country, but we need to go a different direction". On April 2, 2023, during an interview with ABC News' Jonathan Karl, Hutchinson announced his candidacy for the 2024 Republican Party presidential primaries.

Toward the beginning of his campaign Hutchinson distinguished himself as a Trump critic, calling for the former president to drop out of the race after being indicted by a New York grand jury. After Trump was indicted by a federal grand jury for mishandling classified documents, Hutchinson criticized other Republican presidential candidates for saying they would pardon Trump if elected. He also rebuked allegations made by fellow Republicans that the Department of Justice had been "weaponized" against Trump. Hutchinson came out against the decision by the Republican National Committee (RNC) to require candidates wishing to participate in the primary debate to sign a loyalty pledge saying they would support the eventual Republican nominee, stating he would not vote for Trump if convicted on federal charges. Because of the debate conditions, Hutchinson organized a meeting between RNC officials and one of his staffers. The staffer, on behalf of Hutchinson, requested that the RNC amend the debate requirements to accommodate Hutchinson's concerns; the RNC rejected his request. Hutchinson ultimately decided to sign the pledge, but when candidates were asked during the debate to raise their hand if they would still support Trump as the party's nominee if he were convicted, he and Chris Christie were the only ones not to do so.

Hutchinson failed to make any of the other debates, with his poll numbers remaining at around one percent nationally. He would drop out of the race on January 16, the day after he earned only 191 votes in the Iowa caucuses, fewer votes than every other candidate, including little-known candidate Ryan Binkley. Following Hutchinson's withdrawal, the Democratic National Committee (DNC) issued a statement mocking Hutchinson's campaign, "This news comes as a shock to those of us who could’ve sworn he had already dropped out." The statement elicited condemnation from anti-Trump conservatives who chastised the DNC for attacking someone who shared their opposition to Trump. White House Chief of Staff Jeff Zients later called Hutchinson to apologize for the DNC's statement. Days before the New Hampshire primary, Hutchinson endorsed Nikki Haley. After Trump won the primaries, Hutchinson said he planned to write-in a name for president in the general election, refusing to vote for Trump or Democratic nominee Kamala Harris.

== Personal life ==
Hutchinson has four children with his wife, Susan Burrell. Hutchinson's older brother, Tim, preceded him as U.S. representative from Arkansas' 3rd congressional district and served as a U.S. senator from 1997 to 2003 before being defeated for reelection by Arkansas Attorney General Mark Pryor, a Democrat, in 2002. Asa and Tim Hutchinson are both graduates of Bob Jones University. Tim Hutchinson's identical twin sons, Jeremy and Timothy Chad Hutchinson, were the first twins to serve together in the Arkansas General Assembly, both as members of the House of Representatives. Asa Hutchinson is the brother-in-law of former Arkansas state senator Kim Hendren, who in 1958 married his sister Marylea Hutchinson. Arkansas district 2 state senator Jim Hendren of Sulphur Springs is Hutchinson's nephew.

== Electoral history ==
2006 Arkansas gubernatorial election
Party	Candidate	Votes	%	±%
Democratic	Mike Beebe	430,765	55.61%	+8.65%
Republican	Asa Hutchinson	315,040	40.67%	−12.35%
Independent	Rod Bryan	15,767	2.04%	
Green	Jim Lendall	12,774	1.65%	
Write-ins		334	0.04%	
Majority		115,725	14.94%	+8.88%
Turnout		774,680		
Democratic gain from Republican		Swing		

Republican primary for 2014 Arkansas gubernatorial election
Party	Candidate	Votes	%
Republican	Asa Hutchinson	130,752	72.95
Republican	Curtis Coleman	48,473	27.05
Total votes		179,225	100

2014 Arkansas gubernatorial election
Party	Candidate	Votes	%	±%
Republican	Asa Hutchinson	470,429	55.44%	+21.81%
Democratic	Mike Ross	352,115	41.49%	−22.93%
Libertarian	Frank Gilbert	16,319	1.92%	N/A
Green	Josh Drake	9,729	1.15%	−0.71%
Total votes		848,592	100.0%	N/A
Republican gain from Democratic				

Republican primary for 2018 Arkansas gubernatorial election
Party	Candidate	Votes	%
Republican	Asa Hutchinson (incumbent)	145,251	69.7
Republican	Jan Morgan	63,009	30.3
Total votes		208,260	100.0

2018 Arkansas gubernatorial election
Party	Candidate	Votes	%	±%
Republican	Asa Hutchinson (incumbent)	582,406	65.33%	+9.89%
Democratic	Jared Henderson	283,218	31.77%	−9.72%
Libertarian	Mark West	25,885	2.90%	+0.98%
Total votes		891,509	100.0%	N/A
Republican hold				

== See also ==
- 2020 coronavirus pandemic in Arkansas

Legal offices
Preceded by Larry McCord	United States Attorney for the Western District of Arkansas; 1982–1985	Succeeded by Michael Fitzhugh
Party political offices
Preceded by Bill Clark	Republican nominee for U.S. Senator from Arkansas (Class 3); 1986	Succeeded by Mike Huckabee
Preceded by Warren Carpenter	Republican nominee for Attorney General of Arkansas; 1990	Succeeded by Dan Ivy
Preceded by Ken Coon	Chair of the Arkansas Republican Party; 1991–1995; Served alongside: Sheffield Nelson (1991–1992)	Succeeded by Lloyd Stone
Preceded by Mike Huckabee	Republican nominee for Governor of Arkansas; 2006	Succeeded by Jim Keet
Preceded by Jim Keet	Republican nominee for Governor of Arkansas; 2014, 2018	Succeeded by Sarah Huckabee Sanders
U.S. House of Representatives
Preceded by Tim Hutchinson	Member of the U.S. House of Representatives from Arkansas's 3rd congressional district 1997–2001	Succeeded by John Boozman
Political offices
Preceded by William Simpkins; Acting	Administrator of the Drug Enforcement Administration; 2001–2003	Succeeded by Karen Tandy
Preceded by Position established	Under Secretary of Homeland Security for Border and Transportation Security; 2003–2005	Succeeded by Randy Beardsworth; Acting
Preceded by Mike Beebe	Governor of Arkansas; 2015–2023	Succeeded by Sarah Huckabee Sanders
Preceded by Andrew Cuomo	Chair of the National Governors Association; 2021–2022	Succeeded by Phil Murphy
U.S. order of precedence (ceremonial)
Preceded by Mike Beebe as Former Governor	Order of precedence of the United States; Within Arkansas	Succeeded by Jack Markell as Former Governor
Preceded by Mike Beebe as Former Governor	Order of precedence of the United States; Outside Arkansas	Succeeded by James Blanchard as Former Governor
