= 1972 Arkansas gubernatorial election =

- November 7, 1972
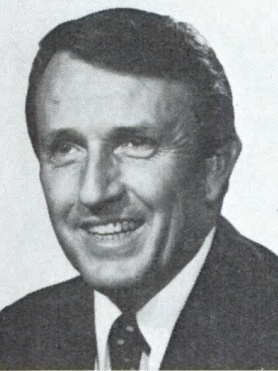

Nominee	Dale Bumpers	Len E. Blaylock
Party	Democratic	Republican
Popular vote	488,892	159,177
Percentage	75.44%	24.56%
- County results Bumpers: 50–60% 60–70% 70–80% 80–90%
Governor before election
Dale Bumpers
Democratic
Elected Governor
Dale Bumpers
Democratic

The 1972 Arkansas gubernatorial election was held on November 7, 1972.

Incumbent Democratic Governor Dale Bumpers defeated Republican nominee Len E. Blaylock with 75.44% of the vote, despite Democratic nominee George McGovern losing the state in a landslide in the concurrent presidential election.

== Primary elections ==
Primary elections were held on May 30, 1972.

=== Democratic primary ===
==== Candidates ====
- Dale Bumpers, incumbent governor
- George W. Davis, state representative
- Les Gibbs, former labor union official
- Mack Harbour, hospital administrator
- Q. Byrum Hurst, state senator

==== Results ====
Bumpers avoided a run-off (which would have been held on 13 June) by winning with more than 50% of the vote.

Democratic primary results
Party	Candidate	Votes	%
Democratic	Dale Bumpers (incumbent)	330,088	66.71
Democratic	Q. Byrum Hurst	81,239	16.42
Democratic	Mack Harbour	55,172	11.15
Democratic	George W. Davis	22,284	4.50
Democratic	Les Gibbs	6,068	1.23
Total votes		494,851	100.00

=== Republican primary ===
==== Candidates ====
- Len E. Blaylock, former staffer and welfare commissioner under Winthrop Rockefeller

==== Results ====
Republican primary results
Party	Candidate	Votes	%
Republican	Len E. Blaylock		unopposed

== General election ==
=== Candidates ===
- Len E. Blaylock, Republican
- Dale Bumpers, Democratic

=== Results ===
1972 Arkansas gubernatorial election
Party	Candidate	Votes	%	±%
Democratic	Dale Bumpers (incumbent)	488,892	75.44%	+13.78%
Republican	Len E. Blaylock	159,177	24.56%	−7.85%
Majority		329,715	50.88%	
Turnout		648,069	100.00%	
Democratic hold		Swing		

== Bibliography ==
- Glashan, Roy R. (1979). American Governors and Gubernatorial Elections, 1775-1978. Meckler Books. ISBN 0-930466-17-9.
- Gubernatorial Elections, 1787-1997. Washington, D.C.: Congressional Quarterly Inc. 1998. ISBN 1-56802-396-0.
- Scammon, Richard M., ed. (1973). America Votes 10: a handbook of contemporary American election statistics, 1972. Washington, D.C.: Governmental Affairs Institute.
