= 1970 Arkansas gubernatorial election =

- November 3, 1970
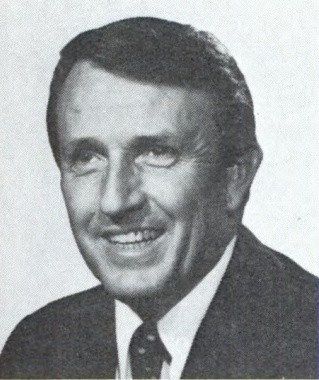

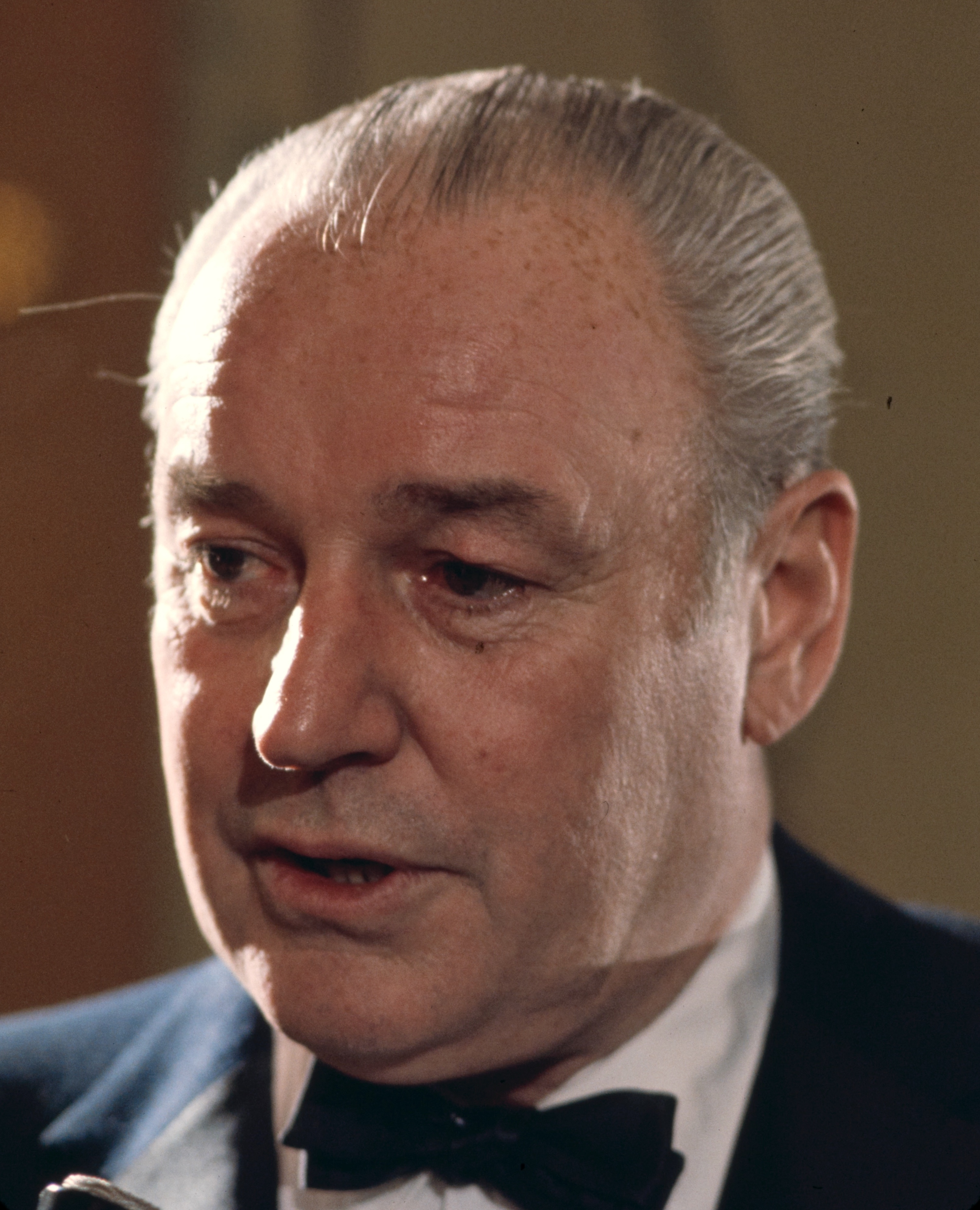

Nominee	Dale Bumpers	Winthrop Rockefeller	Walter L. Carruth
Party	Democratic	Republican	American
Popular vote	375,648	197,418	36,132
Percentage	61.66%	32.41%	5.93%
- County results Bumpers: 40–50% 50–60% 60–70% 70–80% Rockefeller: 40–50%
Governor before election
Winthrop Rockefeller
Republican
Elected Governor
Dale Bumpers
Democratic

The 1970 Arkansas gubernatorial election was held on November 3, 1970.

Incumbent Republican Governor Winthrop Rockefeller ran for a third term but was defeated by Democratic nominee Dale Bumpers who won 61.66% of the vote. As of 2022, this was the last time Lee County voted for the Republican candidate.

== Primary elections ==
Primary elections were held on August 25, 1970, with the Democratic runoff held on September 8, 1970.

=== Democratic primary ===
==== Candidates ====
- Dale Bumpers, Charleston city attorney
- William S. Cheek, businessman
- Robert C. Compton, lawyer and former Prosecuting Attorney
- Orval Faubus, former Governor
- Hayes C. McClerkin, Speaker of the Arkansas House of Representatives
- James M. Malone, Jr., farmer, son of J. M. Malone, unsuccessful candidate for Democratic nomination for governor in 1946
- Joe Purcell, incumbent Arkansas Attorney General
- Bill Wells, former state representative and Democratic candidate for Lieutenant Governor in 1968

==== Results ====
Democratic primary results
Party	Candidate	Votes	%
Democratic	Orval Faubus	156,578	36.36
Democratic	Dale Bumpers	86,156	20.01
Democratic	Joe Purcell	81,566	18.94
Democratic	Hayes C. McClerkin	45,011	10.45
Democratic	Bill Wells	32,543	7.56
Democratic	Robert C. Compton	19,336	4.49
Democratic	James M. Malone	6,718	1.56
Democratic	William S. Cheek	2,725	0.63
Total votes		430,633	100.00

Democratic primary run-off results
Party	Candidate	Votes	%
Democratic	Dale Bumpers	259,780	58.71
Democratic	Orval Faubus	182,732	41.29
Total votes		442,512	100.00

=== Republican primary ===
==== Candidates ====
- Les Gibbs, former tax collector
- R. J. Hampton, president of Shorter College, North Little Rock; first black candidate for governor since 1920
- James MacKrell, Preacher, radio broadcaster, former public relations executive, and a Democratic candidate for governor in 1948
- Winthrop Rockefeller, incumbent Governor

==== Results ====
Republican primary results
Party	Candidate	Votes	%
Republican	Winthrop Rockefeller (incumbent)	58,197	96.79
Republican	R. J. Hampton	829	1.38
Republican	James MacKrell	681	1.13
Republican	Les Gibbs	423	0.70
Total votes		60,130	100.00

== General election ==
=== Candidates ===
- Dale Bumpers, Democratic
- Winthrop Rockefeller, Republican
- Walter L. Carruth, American Party, farmer

=== Results overview ===
1970 Arkansas gubernatorial election
Party	Candidate	Votes	%	±%
Democratic	Dale Bumpers	375,648	61.66%	+14.09%
Republican	Winthrop Rockefeller (incumbent)	197,418	32.41%	−20.02%
American	Walter L. Carruth	36,132	5.93%	
Majority		178,230	29.25%	
Turnout		609,198	100.00%	
Democratic gain from Republican		Swing		

=== Results by county ===
County results
County	Dale Bumpers Democratic Party		Winthrop Rockefeller Republican Party		Walter L. Carruth American Party		Total votes
County	#	%	#	%	#	%	Total votes
Arkansas	4824	63.95%	2058	27.28%	661	8.76%	7543
Ashley	4955	66.07%	2104	28.05%	441	5.88%	7500
Baxter	4119	53.89%	3411	44.63%	113	1.48%	7643
Benton	8471	55.98%	6134	40.53%	528	3.49%	15133
Boone	4873	67.94%	2150	29.98%	149	2.08%	7172
Bradley	2964	63.95%	1317	28.41%	354	7.64%	4635
Calhoun	1501	64.70%	622	26.81%	197	8.49%	2320
Carroll	2976	62.46%	1700	35.68%	89	1.87%	4765
Chicot	2475	48.15%	2455	47.76%	210	4.09%	5140
Clark	4795	67.83%	1936	27.39%	338	4.78%	7069
Clay	4048	69.34%	1615	27.66%	175	3.00%	5838
Cleburne	3250	75.69%	770	17.93%	274	6.38%	4294
Cleveland	1864	70.50%	461	17.44%	319	12.07%	2644
Columbia	4992	65.68%	2397	31.54%	212	2.79%	7601
Conway	4326	66.48%	1941	29.83%	240	3.69%	6507
Craighead	10570	70.69%	3867	25.86%	515	3.44%	14952
Crawford	5169	67.19%	1872	24.33%	652	8.48%	7693
Crittenden	5644	54.73%	4279	41.49%	390	3.78%	10313
Cross	3471	67.49%	1414	27.49%	258	5.02%	5143
Dallas	2240	61.27%	1094	29.92%	322	8.81%	3656
Desha	3283	57.69%	2180	38.31%	228	4.01%	5691
Drew	3085	65.55%	1344	28.56%	277	5.89%	4706
Faulkner	7974	71.51%	2741	24.58%	436	3.91%	11151
Franklin	3776	77.50%	700	14.37%	396	8.13%	4872
Fulton	2062	71.65%	756	26.27%	60	2.08%	2878
Garland	10442	55.63%	6261	33.35%	2069	11.02%	18772
Grant	2745	74.63%	480	13.05%	453	12.32%	3678
Greene	5781	73.34%	1894	24.03%	208	2.64%	7883
Hempstead	4161	63.03%	2156	32.66%	285	4.32%	6602
Hot Spring	5321	67.04%	1792	22.58%	824	10.38%	7937
Howard	3044	72.03%	1077	25.49%	105	2.48%	4226
Independence	5735	71.74%	1935	24.21%	324	4.05%	7994
Izard	2339	77.07%	608	20.03%	88	2.90%	3035
Jackson	4484	66.87%	1806	26.93%	416	6.20%	6706
Jefferson	12914	49.48%	10639	40.76%	2546	9.76%	26099
Johnson	4181	70.64%	1437	24.28%	301	5.09%	5919
Lafayette	1837	55.52%	1253	37.87%	219	6.62%	3309
Lawrence	4255	73.53%	1211	20.93%	321	5.55%	5787
Lee	2561	44.29%	2724	47.11%	497	8.60%	5782
Lincoln	2366	60.81%	1261	32.41%	264	6.78%	3891
Little River	1934	61.57%	1103	35.12%	104	3.31%	3141
Logan	4782	71.84%	1594	23.95%	280	4.21%	6656
Lonoke	5395	67.93%	1817	22.88%	730	9.19%	7942
Madison	2610	61.76%	1514	35.83%	102	2.41%	4226
Marion	1877	59.68%	1228	39.05%	40	1.27%	3145
Miller	5593	60.06%	3099	33.28%	621	6.67%	9313
Mississippi	8655	56.87%	6247	41.05%	316	2.08%	15218
Monroe	2227	45.34%	2021	41.14%	664	13.52%	4912
Montgomery	1683	70.54%	517	21.67%	186	7.80%	2386
Nevada	2518	66.99%	1071	28.49%	170	4.52%	3759
Newton	1611	55.53%	1197	41.26%	93	3.21%	2901
Ouachita	6675	61.01%	3705	33.86%	561	5.13%	10941
Perry	1515	65.05%	701	30.10%	113	4.85%	2329
Phillips	4020	38.92%	4851	46.97%	1457	14.11%	10328
Pike	2202	73.57%	596	19.91%	195	6.52%	2993
Poinsett	5528	72.87%	1828	24.10%	230	3.03%	7586
Polk	2788	63.01%	1228	27.75%	409	9.24%	4425
Pope	6405	69.00%	2523	27.18%	355	3.82%	9283
Prairie	2471	74.07%	627	18.79%	238	7.13%	3336
Pulaski	43097	53.43%	32326	40.08%	5235	6.49%	80658
Randolph	3039	72.50%	1003	23.93%	150	3.58%	4192
Saline	7961	68.75%	2429	20.98%	1189	10.27%	11579
Scott	2588	76.01%	702	20.62%	115	3.38%	3405
Searcy	2042	71.78%	672	23.62%	131	4.60%	2845
Sebastian	16187	62.78%	8271	32.08%	1324	5.14%	25782
Sevier	2558	73.59%	714	20.54%	204	5.87%	3476
Sharp	2098	62.68%	1056	31.55%	193	5.77%	3347
St. Francis	4222	47.04%	3767	41.97%	987	11.00%	8976
Stone	2084	70.67%	734	24.89%	131	4.44%	2949
Union	9628	63.22%	4839	31.77%	763	5.01%	15230
Van Buren	2651	68.43%	983	25.37%	240	6.20%	3874
Washington	11647	54.81%	8933	42.04%	668	3.14%	21248
White	9399	74.62%	2557	20.30%	639	5.07%	12595
Woodruff	2290	60.63%	1120	29.65%	367	9.72%	3777
Yell	3795	76.42%	993	20.00%	178	3.58%	4966
Totals	375648	61.66%	197418	32.41%	36132	5.93%	609198

== Bibliography ==
- Gubernatorial Elections, 1787-1997. Washington, D.C.: Congressional Quarterly Inc. 1998. ISBN 1-56802-396-0.
- Scammon, Richard M., ed. (1972). America Votes 9: a handbook of contemporary American election statistics, 1970. Washington, D.C.: Governmental Affairs Institute. ISBN 9780871870339.
- Urwin, Cathy Kunzinger (1991). Agenda for Reform: Winthrop Rockefeller as Governor of Arkansas, 1967-71. Fayetteville, AR: University of Arkansas Press. ISBN 1-55728-200-5.
