= William L. Spicer =

Arkansas businessman and Republican state chairman (1918–1991)

William Leach Spicer

Chairman of the Arkansas Republican Party
- In office 1962–1964
- Preceded by: Benjamin Charles Henley
- Succeeded by: John Paul Hammerschmidt

Personal details
- Born: October 10, 1918 Yell County, Arkansas, U.S.
- Died: September 23, 1991 (aged 72) Arkansas, U.S.
- Occupation: Businessman: owner of a chain of drive-in theaters

William Leach Spicer (October 10, 1918 – September 23, 1991) was a businessman from Fort Smith, Arkansas, who from 1962 to 1964 was the embattled state chairman of the Arkansas Republican Party.

Originally supported for the position by Winthrop Rockefeller of Morrilton, Spicer soon broke with Rockefeller, the party's key financial backer, over matters of policy issues and party function. Spicer declined to seek reelection as the chairman, but he had resisted intraparty calls that he resign before his term ended in August 1964. He suggested that he could support a "Republicans for Faubus" organization against Rockefeller's gubernatorial bid in 1964, but he remained committed to Republican presidential nominee Barry M. Goldwater of Arizona, whom Rockefeller supported once Goldwater was nominated.

== Background ==
A native of Yell County in western Arkansas, Spicer was the only child of William Jacob Spicer, a Methodist minister for sixty-four years, and the former Ora Leach, hence his middle name. The couple married in 1917 in Logan County, Arkansas. Spicer's paternal grandparents were Monroe Moses Spicer and the former Delia C. Cummings; they are interred at Stony Point Cemetery, also in Logan County.

In the 1930 census, Spicer was living with his parents in Woodruff County in eastern Arkansas. In the 1940 census, Spicer, then twenty-one, was listed as residing still with his parents in Wynne in Cross County, also in eastern Arkansas, where his father, then forty-six, was a pastor. In 1946, Spicer married the former Freda Cowell in Sydney in New South Wales, Australia, possibly while having been on military duty during World War II. The couple had three children, David, Michael, and Sarah Spicer. Mrs. Spicer died in Australia in 1983.

The owner of a chain of drive-in theaters, Spicer in 1956 challenged the incumbent Democrat James William Trimble of Berryville for Arkansas's 3rd congressional district seat and received 34,318 votes (38.7 percent) to Trimble's 54,281 (61.3 percent). Spicer carried Newton and Searcy counties but lost his own Sebastian County, where he polled 46.7 percent of the ballots. Spicer finished six percentage points behind the 1952 Republican congressional candidate, John H. "Jack" Joyce, an attorney from Fayetteville and a fighter pilot in World War II who in that campaign opposed the continuation of the Korean War.,

Spicer's fellow Republican, Ben C. Henley, a lawyer from Harrison in Boone County, also in northwestern Arkansas, ran that year against U.S. Senator J. William Fulbright but finished with only 17 percent of the vote.

== Spicer as chairman ==
When Ben Henley, stepped down in 1962 as the state Republican chairman, Rockefeller publicly endorsed Spicer for the position. At the time Spicer faced opposition in the central committee from Henry M. Britt of Hot Springs, the party's 1960 gubernatorial nominee against Orval Faubus and an attorney and later a judge of the 18th Judicial Circuit Court. Upon his election as chairman in a bid for party unity, Spicer named Britt as the Republican general counsel. Though in the 1950s, Spicer and Britt had supported Dwight D. Eisenhower, by 1963 they were early backers of Goldwater. Spicer called himself a "conservative Republican. I am opposed to socialism and these liberal pinkos in every form and fashion."

Spicer and Britt expected to control federal patronage through the state party committee and were unwilling to cede authority to Rockefeller, who had been since 1961 the state's Republican national committeeman. Within months of his becoming chairman, Spicer was engaged in bitter political attacks on Winthrop Rockefeller. The cause of the disagreement between and the Spicer-Britt forces was related to both patronage and differences in partisan philosophy. Spicer had wanted Rockefeller's party-building activities coordinated through what he called the "state organization."

Spicer particularly quarreled with Rockefeller's paid assistant Everett Ham. According to John L. Ward, a Rockefeller biographer, Ham "could be – and frequently was – quite heavy-handed, excusing it in the name of building a two-party system. Ham knew how to roll heads, and he did it. You could go with Rockefeller, or get out of the way. The old mossback Republicans did neither." There was hence constant feuding in 1963–1964. Ham derided the intra-party rivals as "Post Office Republicans" who concentrated on local patronage over the rigors of running political campaigns in a traditional one-party state. As the tensions with Ham escalated, Spicer wrote Rockefeller to request that Ham be placed in another position in Rockefeller's organization, one in which Ham could not clash with Spicer. William Spicer also feuded with Marion Burton, an attorney from North Little Rock hired by Rockefeller to act as Spicer's own, unwanted executive assistant.

In 1963, Spicer contacted George Hinman, the Republican national committeeman from New York State, an ally of Nelson A. Rockefeller, the New York governor and brother of Winthrop Rockefeller, who challenged Goldwater for the presidential nomination, to discuss the intraparty friction underway in Arkansas. Spicer told Hinman that he found it interesting to observe "the activities of some of the boys operating in Arkansas. I have never seen so many moves being made by the wrong people in the wrong manner at the wrong time." Spicer also contacted Ab Hermann, the national GOP director of political organization, to complain that the Republican National Committee was showing favoritism to Winthrop Rockefeller: "It is most unfortunate to experience this disunity and turmoil in the Republican Party in Arkansas. Every effort has been made to work as a team."

On January 13, 1964, Spicer wrote to John Paul Hammerschmidt, a businessman from Harrison, and Eugene "Gene" Holman of DeQueen to explain that he was aware of efforts underway to remove him from the chairmanship. It was Hammerschmidt who succeeded Spicer in the fall of 1964 when Spicer resigned, having vowed "to wash my hands of the whole thing."

In 1963, the Arkansas Republican executive committee criticized Rockefeller's retaining of his own staff men to conduct a political drive. In March 1964, however, the same committee reversed itself and approved Rockefeller's hiring of four men at his own expense to enlist party members. A Little Rock businessman explained that the GOP under Henley and Spicer had been "sort of a small, closely held corporation here, and the members of the clan didn't want it to get too big." Spicer partisans said that the Rockefeller associates had "kicked the old Republicans out ... imagine the reaction of a 50-or 60-year old Republican who's been spending his own time and money working at this to have some two-bit employee come in and tell him what to do to win an election."

Winthrop Rockefeller said that he had letters from new arrivals in Arkansas who had insisted that Spicer had made them fell "not welcome" in the GOP.G. Thomas Eisele, a veteran Rockefeller advisor and a U.S. District Judge in Little Rock, admitted that Ham had employed "ruthless tactics" against party conservatives. Rockefeller stressed the two-party theme, established a United Republican Fund that was raising nearly $8,000 per month by 1966, and worked to establish a permanent Republican committee in each of the seventy-five counties. In 1972, not long before his death, Rockefeller reflected on his fight with the Spicer partisans:

The basic problem was political philosophy coupled with enormous ego. His following was politically antagonistic to my basic philosophy. They were the right-wingers up to and including sometimes Birchers, and they were power-crazy.

== Presidential politics, 1964 ==
Spicer accused Winthrop Rockefeller of dividing the small party organization by politicking behind the scenes for Nelson Rockefeller's presidential primary campaign against Goldwater. Though Spicer preferred Goldwater, he suggested that to maintain unity the party send unpledged delegates to the national convention which met that year in San Francisco, California. "It is inappropriate for the national committeeman or the state chairman to be campaigning for any candidate," Spicer said. Spicer admitted that Winthrop Rockefeller "sees the policies of the Republican Party in one direction, and I see them 180 degrees in the other direction."

Coupled with Rockefeller's disputes with Spicer and Britt, the presidential divisions within the Arkansas GOP undermined Winthrop Rockefeller's own plans to run for governor in 1964, when he lost to the Democratic incumbent Orval Faubus, who ironically in 1955 had appointed Rockefeller to the highly visible chairmanship of the Arkansas Industrial Development Commission.

Eisele and Ham disagreed on how to promote Rockefeller in the 1964 gubernatorial race against Faubus. Eisele urged the formation of a moderate coalition that would appeal to supporters of U.S. President Lyndon B. Johnson, who was supporting Faubus. Ham urged the party in Arkansas to embrace Goldwater to increase conservative support for Rockefeller, who was expected also to receive some moderate and liberal support among Independent voters. Ultimately both Johnson and Faubus won the state with 57 percent of the vote.

After two years as chairman, Spicer was succeeded in 1964 by Rockefeller's subsequent choice, John Paul Hammerschmidt, a World War II Medal of Honor winner. On November 8, 1966, in a sudden upsurge for the Arkansas GOP that attracted national attention, Rockefeller, after having lost to Orval Faubus two years earlier, was elected governor, and Hammerschmidt became the first member of the GOP to represent the state in the United States House of Representatives since Reconstruction. Hammerschmidt prevailed in his race in the 3rd congressional district, the same seat that Spicer had sought a decade earlier.

Party political offices
Preceded by Benjamin Charles Henley	Chairman of the Arkansas Republican Party; 1962–1964	Succeeded by John Paul Hammerschmidt
