= Jim Caldwell (Arkansas politician) =

American politician (born 1936)

James Ray "Jim" Caldwell

Member of the Arkansas Senate from the 9th (then Benton and Carroll counties) district
- In office January 1, 1969 – December 31, 1978
- Preceded by: Russell Elrod
- Succeeded by: Kim Hendren

Chair of the Arkansas Republican Party
- In office March 1973 – December 1974
- Preceded by: Charles T. Bernard
- Succeeded by: Lynn Lowe

Personal details
- Born: 1936 (age 89–90) Dardanelle, Yell County; Arkansas, U.S.
- Spouse: Laferne Muller Caldwell
- Children: Four daughters
- Education: Central High School (Tulsa) Harding University; Southern Methodist University University of Tulsa
- Occupation: Minister; After-dinner speaker

Military service
- Branch/service: United States Air Force

James Ray Caldwell, known as Jim R. Caldwell (born 1936), is a retired Church of Christ minister in Tulsa, Oklahoma, who was a Republican member of the Arkansas Senate from 1969 to 1978, the first member of his party to sit in the legislative upper chamber in the 20th century. His first two years as a senator corresponded with the second two-year term of Winthrop Rockefeller, the first Republican governor of Arkansas since the Reconstruction era. Caldwell was closely allied with Rockefeller during the 1969-1970 legislative sessions.

== Background ==
A native of Dardanelle in Yell County in west central Arkansas, Caldwell was a son of Reece E. Caldwell (1912–1971) and the former Oval Ermice Greene (1914–2000). He attended the first eleven years of school in Dardanelle but completed his senior year at Central High School in Tulsa. In 1958, he obtained a Bachelor of Arts degree in general studies from the Church of Christ-affiliated Harding College in Searcy in White County, Arkansas. He received a Master of Science from Southern Methodist University in Dallas, Texas, and pursued but did not complete doctoral studies at the private University of Tulsa. He became a minister in 1956, and while a state senator, he was the minister at the Southside Church of Christ in Rogers in Benton County in northwestern Arkansas. He began after-dinner speaking before church and civic groups. For eight years before his return to Arkansas from Oklahoma, Caldwell served on stand-by in the Oklahoma Air National Guard.

== Arkansas legislative politics ==
A Democrat-turned-Republican, Caldwell first won the general election for state senator for Benton and Carroll counties in 1968, when he unseated the veteran Democratic incumbent, Russell Elrod (1904–1985) of Siloam Springs, who in the 1953–1954 session had been the Senate President Pro Tempore. Although he was considered a "progressive" or a Moderate Republican within the legislature, Caldwell recalled years later that he really had "no ideology, no issue when I first ran. I just thought a two-party system was a good idea. I don't recall any of us [Republican legislators] having an agenda. ... Usually when the candidates get to town, they see the big picture, and they understand they have to deal with issues that don't just apply to their home district."

In 1969, Caldwell joined two other senators who defended the right of Muhammad Ali, the African American boxer who converted to Islam and avoided military service in the Vietnam War, to speak at the student forum at the University of Arkansas at Fayetteville. "I don't agree with him, but he should be heard," explained Caldwell. Democratic Senator Milt Earnhart of Fort Smith introduced a resolution to condemn Ali's appearance, and Republican Lieutenant Governor Maurice Britt declared that the resolution had passed by a voice vote. In his speech Ali stunned many when he spoke highly of former Governor George C. Wallace of Alabama, who the year before had won forty-six electoral votes, including the six from Arkansas, as the nominee of the American Independent Party, only to lose the 1968 presidential election to Richard M. Nixon. Ali discussed racial segregation and said that he understood why whites in the American South as late as the early 20th century had lynched blacks who had molested white women. Ali further urged African-American men to protect black women.

In the 1969 legislative session, Caldwell followed Rockefeller's lead in supporting the legalization of the sale of mixed drinks when approved through local option. As a minister, Caldwell lectured against the use of liquor, but as a senator he urged that the matter be resolved at the local level.

In 1972 and 1974, Caldwell topped two other Democrats, Bill Nelson of Rogers and Rex Bolin, an insurance agent from Bentonville, to secure terms of two years and then four years, respectively.

== State Republican chairman ==
From 1973 to 1974, Senator Caldwell was also the Arkansas Republican chairman during a particularly bleak period for his party. In March 1973, a month after Rockefeller's death, Caldwell was elected as chairman to succeed Charles T. Bernard of Earle in Crittenden County in eastern Arkansas. Bernard had lost the 1968 race for the U.S. Senate to incumbent Democrat J. William Fulbright in what turned out to have been Fulbright's last successful election. In this role, Caldwell opposed fielding "sacrificial lambs" Griffith was a placeholder on the ballot. Caldwell expressed doubt that the GOP could win the governorship again for at least six years.

Jack Bass and Walter DeVries write that in 1974 the Arkansas GOP was seeking a new political personality in the post-Rockefeller era. Bass/DeVries speculated that the GOP could be revived: "Continued urbanization and economic growth should enable the Republicans to remain viable as an alternative if the Democrats drift from moderation."

A defender of the embattled President Nixon, Caldwell questioned whether the Watergate disclosures would have much impact on the Arkansas GOP because of the lack of political opportunities then available within the state. Caldwell called upon Republicans to continue to recruit African-American voters and Independents, something Rockefeller had pursued with considerable success in the short term. Caldwell said that many in his party were not "thinking in practical terms. We're busy debating issues that don't elect anybody." The Arkansas GOP, he said at the time, was in "a serious adjustment period" since Rockefeller's death in February 1973. In 1974, the GOP had organizations in just seventeen of the seventy-five Arkansas counties. The party supported its staff with occasional fundraising in the amount of $143,000 in 1973. The Republicans lost their best issue with the demise of the "Old Guard" Democrats, epitomized by former Governor Orval Faubus. Caldwell said that he believed that the GOP could nevertheless win with "the right candidate ... under the right circumstances."

In December 1974, Caldwell stepped down as state chairman and was succeeded by Lynn Lowe, a farmer in Miller County near Texarkana, who ran in 1966 for the United States House of Representatives against David Pryor and carried the Republican gubernatorial banner in 1978 against Bill Clinton. In 1975, Lowe speculated that Vice President Nelson A. Rockefeller, an older brother of Winthrop Rockefeller, had retained support within the Arkansas GOP because of "the feelings for his brother," but Nelson Rockefeller soon removed himself for consideration to a full term and was replaced on the unsuccessful 1976 Republican ticket by Robert J. Dole of Kansas.

Like his legislative colleague Danny L. Patrick of Madison County and the GOP functionary Len Blaylock of Perry County, Caldwell recalls having become personally friendly with Orval Faubus, whom he met in 1970 during the unsuccessful Rockefeller reelection campaign. Sitting Governor Jim Guy Tucker delivered the main address as Faubus' body lay in state at the Arkansas capitol.

== Later years ==
Caldwell did not seek reelection in 1978 and was succeeded by the Democrat, later Republican convert, Kim Hendren of Gravette in Benton County. Kim Hendren is a brother-in-law of former U.S. Senator Tim Hutchinson and former U.S. Representative nd current Governor Asa Hutchinson. Hendren himself lost a bid in 2010 for the Republican nomination for the U.S. Senate to John Boozman, who went on to unseat the Democrat Blanche Lincoln.

From 1987 to 1988, Caldwell served as chief of staff in the Tulsa office of James M. Inhofe who at that time had been elected to his first term as a member of the U.S. House of Representatives for Oklahoma's 1st congressional district.

In 2003, Caldwell was honored at a dinner by then Arkansas Governor Mike Huckabee for Caldwell's role in sponsoring legislation during the 1970s to expand the University of Arkansas for Medical Sciences at Little Rock.

Caldwell said that as an Oklahoma voter he usually voted for Republican candidates but declined to back the party's nominee for state attorney general in 2010 because that successful candidate, Scott Pruitt, campaigned against the Patient Protection and Affordable Care Act ("Obamacare"). "A conservative Republican in Arkansas would be a liberal over here," Caldwell jokingly said of the political climate in Oklahoma. Mark Darr, the Republican elected lieutenant governor of Arkansas in 2010, also campaigned against the Democrat health care law. Pruitt in 2017 joined the Donald Trump administration as administrator of the Environmental Protection Agency.

Winthrop Rockefeller had few members of his own party to guide his programs through the legislature. Eleven of Rockefeller vetoes were overridden, far more than for other Arkansas governors in a four-year period. The fate of Rockefeller programs rested with the Democratic legislators, one of whom, Arkansas House Speaker Sterling R. Cockrill of Little Rock, provided assistance to Rockefeller and in 1970 even joined the Republican Party to run for lieutenant governor on Rockefeller's ticket when Maurice Britt stepped down.

After Rockefeller's defeat in 1970 and death barely two years later, the state GOP apparatus returned to the control of the mostly unknown partisans, a few of whom had previously been active in the party. Republicans in Arkansas found it difficult to function without Rockefeller's financial support. As time passed, one might conclude that the state GOP made only minimal progress in its political mission though some of the programs were adopted under Rockefeller and in subsequent administrations beginning with his immediate successor, Dale Bumpers, and then David Pryor. In time, the GOP moved beyond Rockefeller's moderate stance to a more conservative governing philosophy than that which Rockefeller and Caldwell had championed.

Political offices
Preceded by Russell Elrod	Arkansas State Senator for Benton and Carroll counties (now District 9); 1969–1978	Succeeded by Kim D. Hendren
Preceded by Charles T. Bernard	Chairman of the Arkansas Republican Party; 1973–1974	Succeeded by Lynn Lowe
