= Cosmic Cavern =

Limestone cave in Arkansas, U.S.

Coordinates: 36.4359°N 93.4973°W

Cosmic Cavern is a limestone cave located in north Arkansas, near the town of Berryville, Arkansas.

One brochure for the cave touts it as "Arkansas' Most Beautifully Decorated Cave." It is the "warmest" cave in the Ozarks, having a high humidity holding at a constant 64 °F year-round. Most caves in the area are between 55° and 60°.

The cave has an abundance of formations (speleothems), including stalactites, stalagmites, flowstone, cave popcorn, cave bacon, and a multitude of soda straws and helictites.

One section of the cave housing a particularly enormous group of soda straws has been dubbed "Silent Splendor." One of the longest soda straw formations in the Ozarks, this large formation has straws hanging up to nine feet in length.

== Lakes and life in the cave ==
Cosmic Cavern has two cave lakes reported to be bottomless, since cave divers have never found the bottoms. They are among the largest underground lakes in the Ozarks. The south lake was artificially stocked with trout in 1957 where the tours could feed them from a platform above; however, the trout no longer reside in Cosmic Cavern's South Lake bringing it back to its natural state.

Rainfall is known to dramatically change the water level in the cave, which can fill and empty rapidly.

Other life in the cave includes the Ozark blind salamander. This salamander is endemic to the Ozarks, where it is found in several caves. It is related to the Olm (Proteus anguinus). Though there are also isopods and crawdads in the cave, these are not believed to be native. On occasion, you will also find tri-colored, pip, and brown bats. In the “Twighlight Zone” of the cave (just inside the entrance) you'll sometimes find the grotto salamander with its colors of orange and black.

== Discovery and history ==
Cosmic Cavern was discovered in 1845 by a prospector named John Moore, who was searching for lead. The areas near the entrance to the cave were, upon its discovery, mined for much of its onyx. Soot from their torches can still be seen. Since these early visitors of the cave were afraid of bats, they originally dropped burning tires into the cave to smoke them out. After 70 years, the population is just now beginning to return.

The cave changed hands more than 14 times until its present owners, the Randy Langhover family, bought it in 1980.

Reportedly, the gangsters Bonnie and Clyde were in the neighborhood in the early 1930s. They used the road west of the cave as an escape from Missouri lawmen. They cruised by with a storekeeper they had kidnapped in Missouri in 1933, on their way to releasing him in the Berryville square.

== Publicity and tours ==
When the "Silent Splendor" room was discovered in 1993, it was featured nationally in newspapers and on CBS news. The cave has also appeared in an IMAX films, Journey into Amazing Caves & Ozarks Legacy & Legends

Cosmic cavern hosts a regular tourist tour as well as a "wild" cave tour. The "wild" cave tour takes visitors into the undeveloped parts of the cave where the most spectacular formations are found. The gift shop has a small museum on the second floor, highlighting some of the cave's history. One of the exhibits is a large sign that was found crumpled in a ditch, dating from when the cave was called "Mystery Cave."

The cave is part of the National Caves Association.

There was also a Paranormal Documentary episode made in 2025 directed by film-maker and Arkansas native Gavin Webb for the TV Series "Haunted Arkansas". It goes into the history of the Caverns and why the location is possible haunted.
