= 1968 United States Senate election in Arkansas =

- November 5, 1968
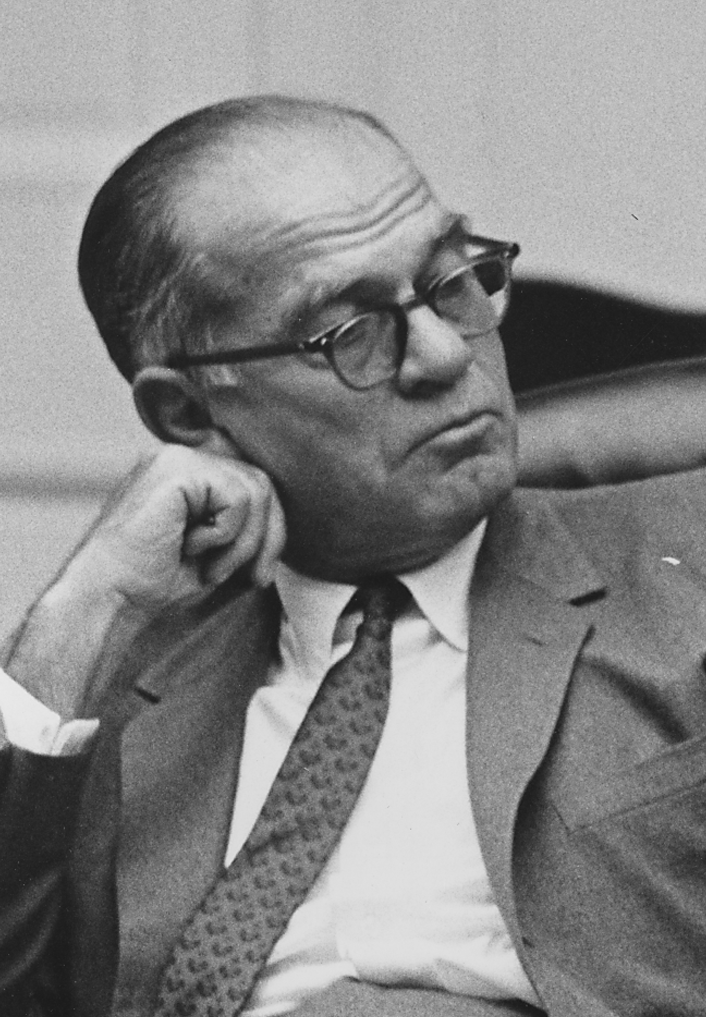

| Nominee | J. William Fulbright | Charles T. Bernard |
| Party | Democratic | Republican |
| Popular vote | 349,965 | 241,731 |
| Percentage | 59.15% | 40.85% |
- County results Fulbright: 50–60% 60–70% 70–80% Bernard: 50–60% 60–70%
U.S. senator before election
J. William Fulbright
Democratic
Elected U.S. Senator
J. William Fulbright
Democratic

The 1968 United States Senate election in Arkansas was held on November 5, 1968.

Incumbent Democratic Senator J. William Fulbright was re-elected to a fifth term, defeating Democratic and Republican challengers. However, Fulbright saw his margin of victory reduced by twenty points, following the national trend of the Republicans gaining ground in federal politics.

== Democratic primary ==
=== Candidates ===
- J. William Fulbright, incumbent U.S. Senator
- Bob Hayes, resident of Calico Rock
- Foster Johnson, candidate for U.S. Senate in 1966
- James D. Johnson, former Associate Justice of the Arkansas Supreme Court and 1966 nominee for Governor of Arkansas

=== Results ===
The primary was held on July 30.

1968 Democratic U.S. Senate primary
| Party | Candidate | Votes | % |
|---|---|---|---|
| Democratic | J. William Fulbright (incumbent) | 220,684 | 52.92% |
| Democratic | James D. Johnson | 132,038 | 31.66% |
| Democratic | Bob Hayes | 52,906 | 12.69% |
| Democratic | Foster Johnson | 11,395 | 2.73% |
| Total votes | | 417,023 | 100.00% |

== General election ==
=== Results ===
General election results
| Party | Candidate | Votes | % | ±% |
|---|---|---|---|---|
| Democratic | J. William Fulbright (incumbent) | 349,965 | 59.15% | ▼9.52 |
| Republican | Charles T. Bernard | 241,731 | 40.85% | ▲9.52 |
| Total votes | | 591,696 | 100.00% | |

== See also ==
- 1968 United States Senate elections
