= Republican Party of Arkansas =

Arkansas affiliate of the Republican Party

Coordinates: 34°44′41.1″N 92°17′04.7″W

- Abbreviation: RPA
- Chairperson: Joseph K. Wood
- Governor: Sarah Huckabee Sanders
- Lieutenant Governor: Leslie Rutledge
- Senate President pro tempore: Bart Hester
- House Speaker: Brian S. Evans
- Founded: April 2, 1867 (159 years ago)
- Headquarters: 1201 West 6th Street, Little Rock, Arkansas
- Membership (June 2021): 117,277
- Ideology: Conservatism
- National affiliation: Republican Party
- State House: 80 / 100
- State Senate: 29 / 35
- Statewide Executive Offices: 7 / 7
- U.S. House of Representatives: 4 / 4
- U.S. Senate: 2 / 2

Election symbol

Website
- arkansasgop.org

The Republican Party of Arkansas (RPA), headquartered at 1201 West 6th Street in downtown Little Rock, is the affiliate of the Republican Party in Arkansas. It is currently the dominant party in the state, controlling all four of Arkansas' U.S. House seats, both U.S. Senate seats, all statewide executive offices, including the governorship, and supermajorities in both houses of the state legislature.

The Republican Party of Arkansas was founded on April 2, 1867, by "the leading Union men" of Arkansas. Under Powell Clayton, it played a preeminent role in politics at the height of Reconstruction in the state (1864–1874). The party chairman is Joseph K. Wood, and the current executive director is Drew Martin.

== History ==
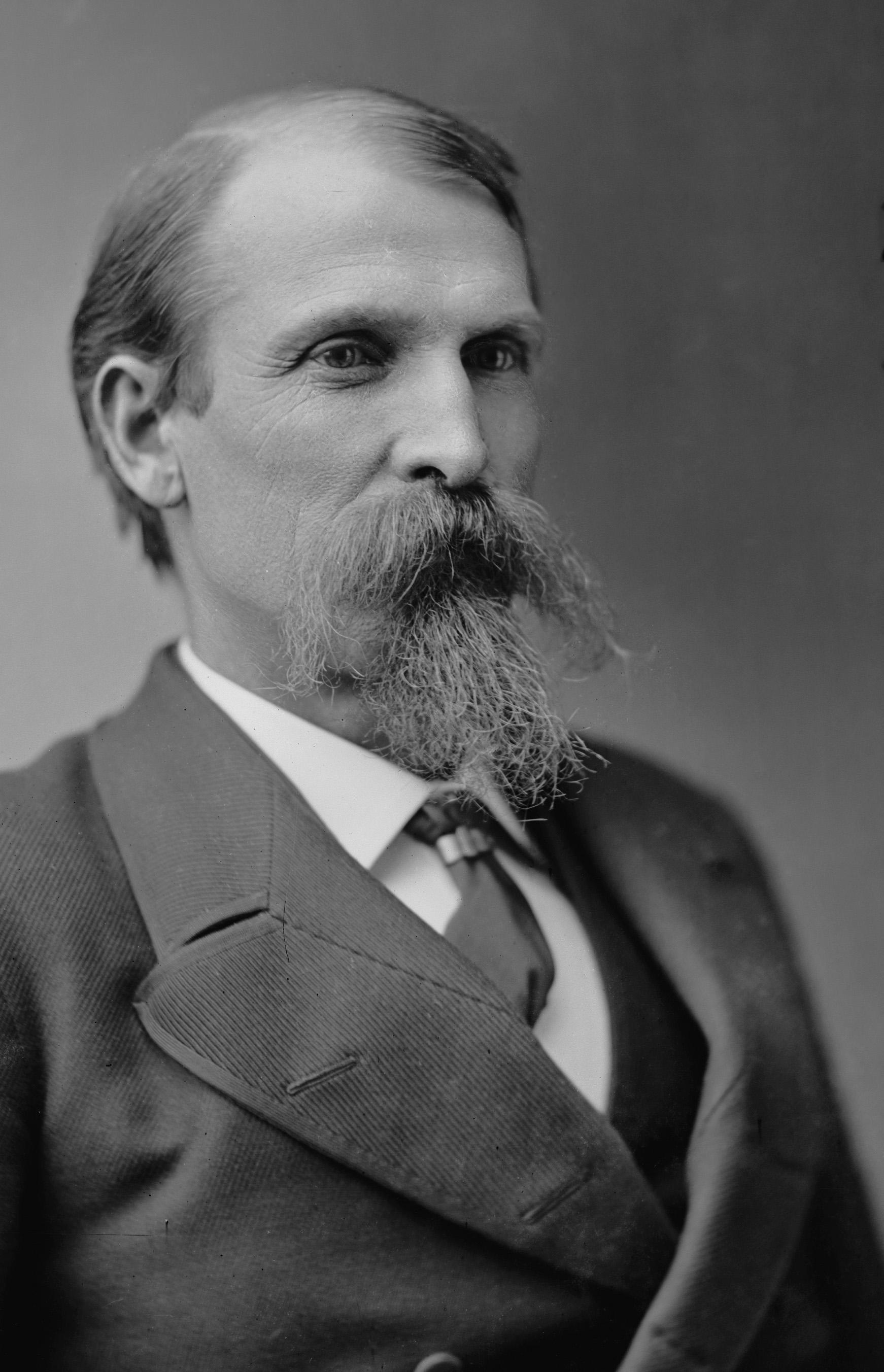
Powell Clayton, 9th Governor of Arkansas (1868–1871) and the first Republican to hold the office

The Republican Party, also referred to as the GOP (Grand Old Party), is the second oldest currently existing political party in the United States after its older rival, the Democratic Party. Both parties exist in all 50 states. Historically, prior to the late 20th century, the Republican Party was much weaker than the Democratic Party in the former states of the old Confederacy, including Arkansas.

The Arkansas party did not hire its first paid executive director until 1970, when businessman Neal Sox Johnson, then of Nashville, Arkansas, assumed the position in the last year of Winthrop Rockefeller's second term as governor of Arkansas. Johnson held the position until early in 1973, when he left Arkansas to take a position with the former Farmers Home Administration in Washington.

Between 2010 and 2014, similar to what took place in neighboring Oklahoma, Arkansas Republicans won all four U.S. House seats, both U.S. Senate seats, all of the statewide offices, and supermajority control of both chambers of the General Assembly.

== Associated groups ==
There are six groups and these groups are: Arkansas Diversity Alliances Coalition, African American Coalition of Arkansas, Arkansas African American Trailblazers, Arkansas Federation of College Republicans, Arkansas Federation of Young Republicans, Arkansas Federation of Republican Women, and the Arkansas Federation of Teenage Republicans. The Tusk Club is another arm of the Arkansas Republican Party.

== Republican governors ==
As of 2023, there have been a total of eight Republican governors.

#	Governor	Photo	County	Start date	End date	Time in office
9	Powell Clayton (1833–1914)		Jefferson	July 2, 1868	March 17, 1871 (Note: Resigned.)	2 years, 258 days
—	Ozra Amander Hadley (1826–1915)		Pulaski	March 17, 1871	January 6, 1873	1 year, 295 days (Note: President of the Senate acting as Governor.)
10	Elisha Baxter (1827–1899)		Independence	January 6, 1873	November 12, 1874	1 year, 310 days
37	Winthrop Rockefeller (1912–1973)		Conway	January 10, 1967	January 12, 1971	4 years, 2 days
41	Frank D. White (1933–2003)		Pulaski	January 19, 1981	January 11, 1983	1 year, 357 days
44	Mike Huckabee (born 1955)		Hempstead	July 15, 1996	January 9, 2007	10 years, 359 days
46	Asa Hutchinson (born 1950)		Benton	January 13, 2015	January 10, 2023	7 years, 362 days
47	Sarah Huckabee Sanders (born 1982)		Hempstead	January 10, 2023	Incumbent	3 years, 315 days

== Current elected officials ==
The Arkansas Republican Party controls all of the state's seven statewide offices. Republicans also hold both of the state's U.S. Senate seats and all four of the state's U.S. House seats.

=== Members of Congress ===
==== U.S. Senate ====
Republicans have controlled both of Arkansas's seats in the U.S. Senate since 2015:

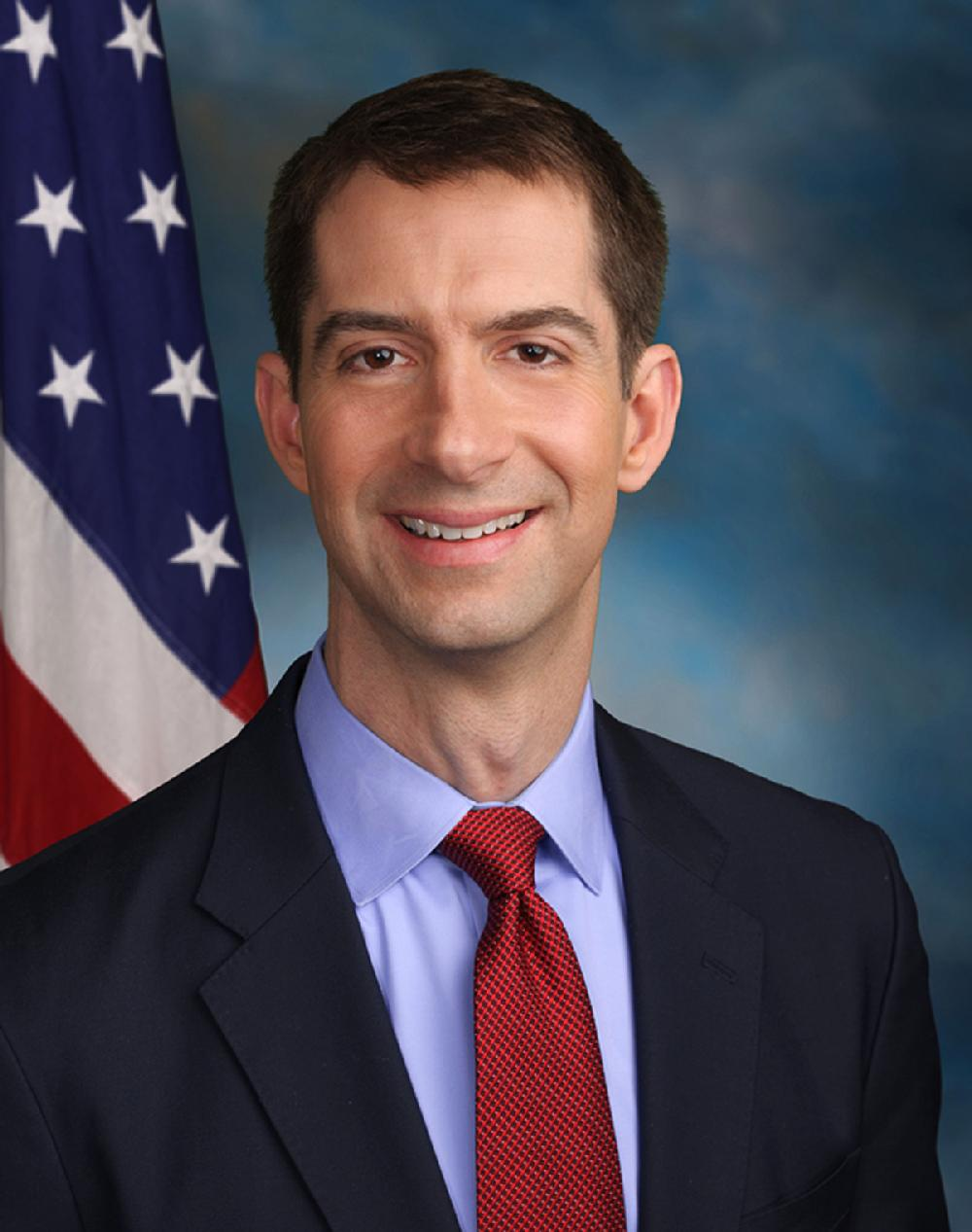
Junior U.S. Senator Tom Cotton

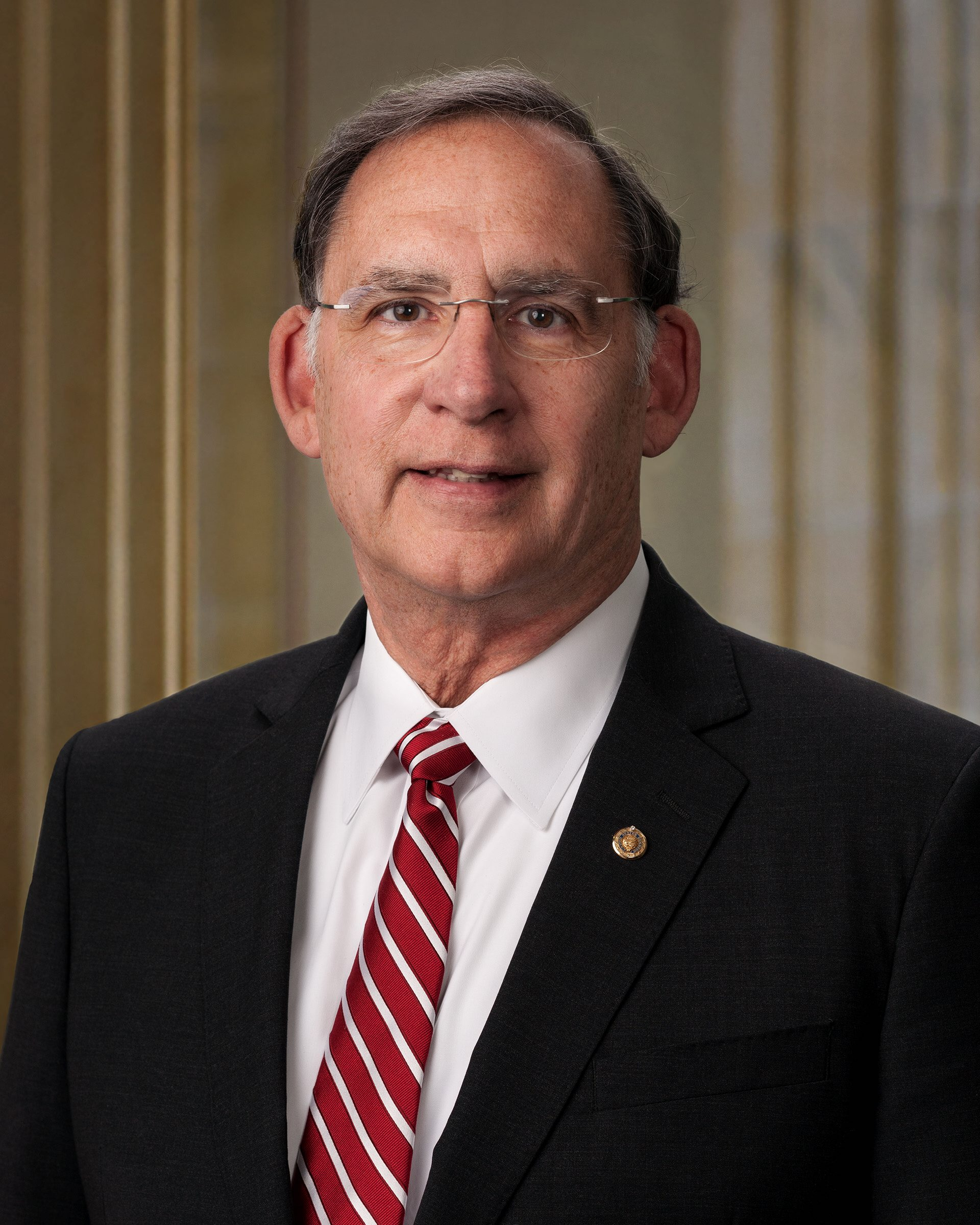
Senior U.S. Senator John Boozman

==== U.S. House of Representatives ====
Out of the four seats Arkansas is apportioned in the U.S. House of Representatives, all four are held by Republicans:

District	Member	Photo
1st	Rick Crawford	
2nd	French Hill	
3rd	Steve Womack	
4th	Bruce Westerman	

=== Statewide offices ===
Republicans control all seven of the elected statewide constitutional offices:

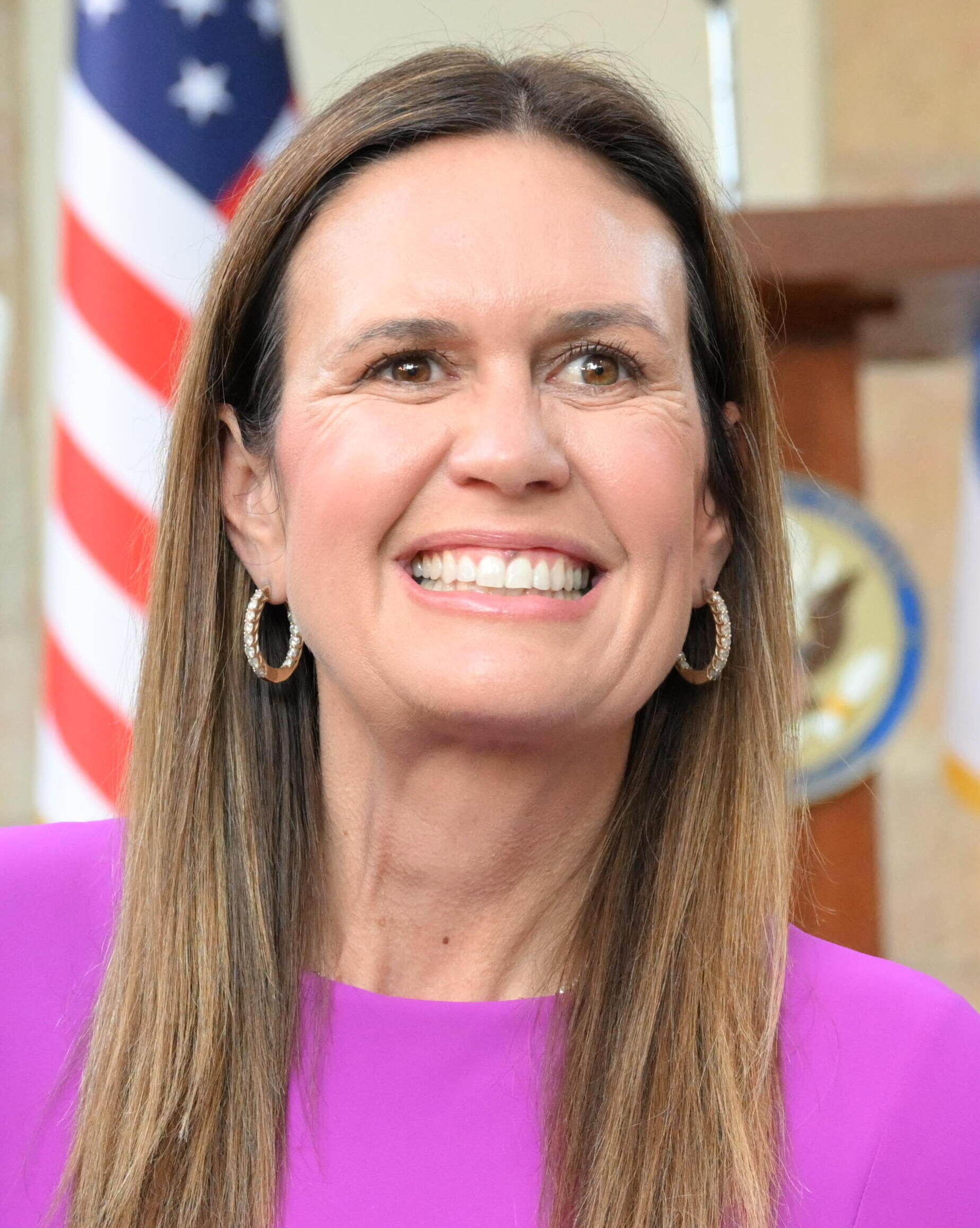
Governor Sarah Huckabee Sanders

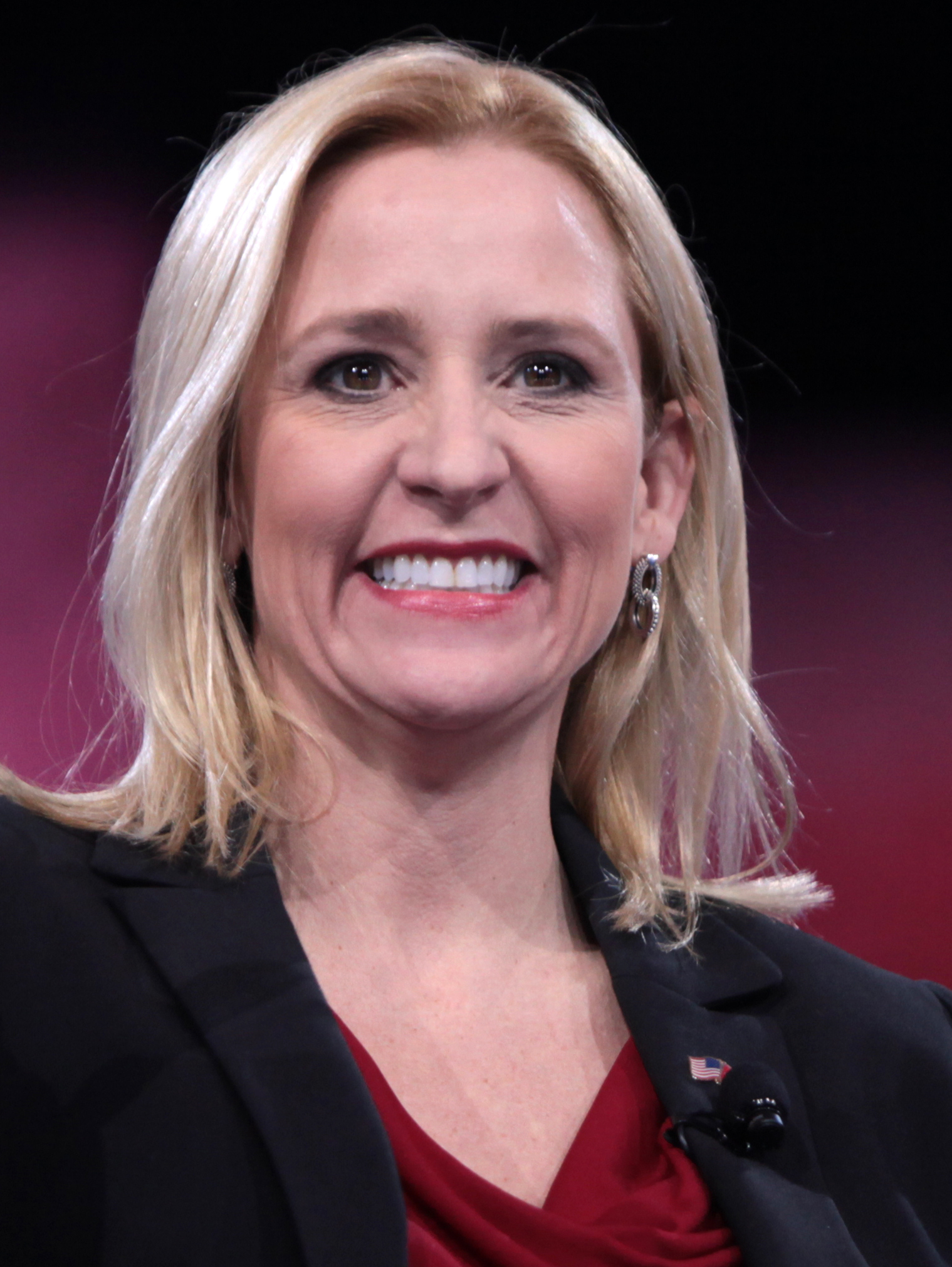
Lieutenant Governor Leslie Rutledge

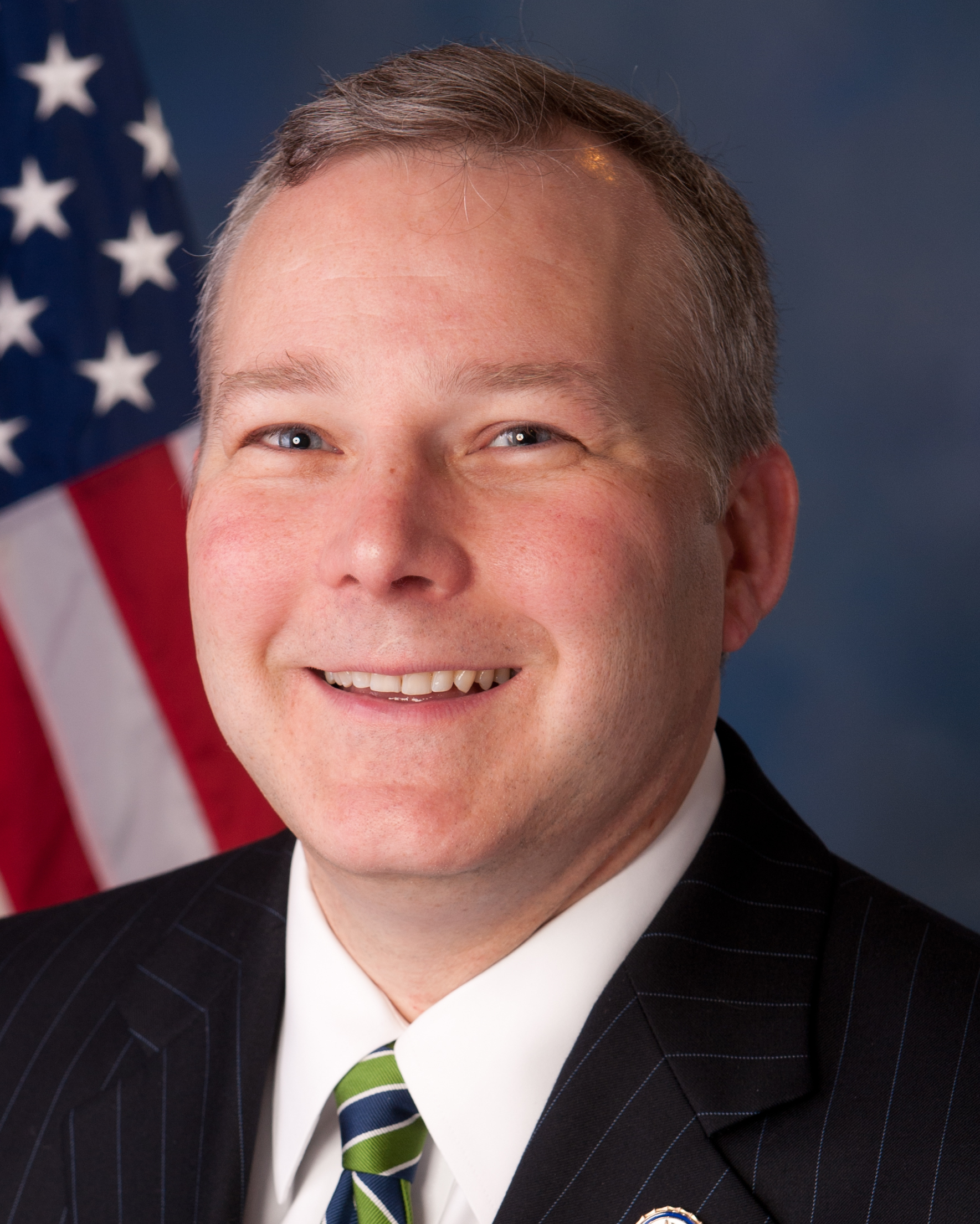
Attorney General Tim Griffin
- Secretary of State: Cole Jester
- State Auditor: Dennis Milligan
- State Treasurer: John Thurston
- Commissioner of State Lands: Tommy Land

=== State legislative leaders ===
- Senate President Pro Tempore: Bart Hester
  - Senate Majority Leader: Blake Johnson
- Speaker of the House: Brian S. Evans
  - Speaker Pro Tempore: Jon Eubanks
  - House Majority Leader: Howard Beaty

== List of chairmen ==
This is a list of chairmen of the Republican Party of Arkansas:

- 1932–1955: Osro Cobb
- 1955–1962: Ben C. Henley
- 1962–1964: William L. Spicer
- 1964–1966: John P. Hammerschmidt
- 1966–1970: Odell Pollard
- 1970–1972: Charles T. Bernard
- 1972–1974: Jim Caldwell
- 1974–1980: A. Lynn Lowe
- 1980: Jeraldine D. Pruden (interim)
- 1980–1982: Harlan Holleman
- 1982: Bob Cohee (interim)
- 1982–1983: Morris S. Arnold
- 1983–1984: Bob Leslie
- 1984–1985: William Kelly
- 1985: Sharon Trusty (interim)
- 1985–1986: Len E. Blaylock
- 1986–1988: Ed Bethune
- 1988–1990: Dr. Ken Coon (Also serving as Executive Director)
- 1991–1992: Asa Hutchinson (co-chairman)
- 1991–1992: Sheffield Nelson (co-chairman)
- 1992–1995: Asa Hutchinson
- 1995–2002: Lloyd Vance Stone Jr.
- 2002–2003: John P. Hammerschmidt
- 2003–2004: Winthrop P. Rockefeller
- 2004–2007: Gilbert Baker
- 2007–2008: Dennis Milligan
- 2008–2020: Doyle Webb
- 2020–2022: Jonelle Fulmer
- 2022–2023: Cody Hiland
- 2023: John Parke
- 2023–present: Joseph Wood

== Electoral history ==
=== Gubernatorial ===
Arkansas Republican Party gubernatorial election results
Election	Gubernatorial candidate	Votes	Vote %	Result
1994	Sheffield Nelson	287,904	40.16%	Lost ✗
1998	Mike Huckabee	421,989	59.77%	Won ✓
2002	Mike Huckabee	427,082	53.02%	Won ✓
2006	Asa Hutchinson	315,040	40.67%	Lost ✗
2010	Jim Keet	262,784	33.63%	Lost ✗
2014	Asa Hutchinson	470,429	55.44%	Won ✓
2018	Asa Hutchinson	582,406	65.33%	Won ✓
2022	Sarah Huckabee Sanders	571,105	62.96%	Won ✓
2026	Sarah Huckabee Sanders	477,304	53.87%	Won ✓

== See also ==
- Democratic Party of Arkansas
- Political party strength in Arkansas
