= Charles T. Bernard =

American businessman and politician

Arkansas Republican Party State Chairman
- In office 1971–1973
- Preceded by: Odell Pollard
- Succeeded by: Jim R. Caldwell

Personal details
- Born: Charles Taylor Bernard; September 10, 1927 Earle, Arkansas, U.S.
- Died: June 27, 2015 (aged 87) Memphis, Tennessee, U.S.
- Party: Republican
- Spouse: Betty Hill (divorced)
- Domestic partner: Jaynie Moon
- Children: 5
- Education: Baylor University
- Occupation: Farmer; businessman
- In 1968, Bernard made the strongest showing of any Republican nominee against Democratic U.S. Senator J. William Fulbright in Arkansas but barely reached 40 percent.

Charles Taylor Bernard Sr. (September 10, 1927 – June 27, 2015) was an American businessman and politician originally from Earle, Arkansas. He is best known as the 1968 Republican nominee for the United States Senate seat held by long-time Democrat J. William Fulbright of Fayetteville.

== Background ==
Bernard attended Baylor University in Waco, Texas, where he became enamored with the poetry of Robert Browning, whom he often quoted. He farmed cotton at Earle and operated One Hour Martenizing dry cleaning establishments in eastern Arkansas.

In 2013, he was listed as a resident of Naples, Florida. His obituary indicates that he also resided in Maui, Hawaii. Bernard and his wife, the former Betty Hill (born c. 1931), who still resides in Earle, had five children: Sallie Hill Armstrong (husband Robert) of Reno, Nevada; Mary Troy Johnston (Kauaʻi, Hawaii), Charles Taylor Bernard Jr., and wife Elaine of Memphis, Tennessee; David Wesley Bernard and wife Virginia Caris of Birmingham, Alabama, and John Harbert Bernard and wife Mary Reynolds of Atlanta, Georgia.

His obituary indicated that after the middle 1980s he lived with Jaynie Moon (born c. 1941). The obituary does not indicated if he divorced Betty. At the age of seventy-five, Bernard hiked with all the men of his family to the bottom of the Grand Canyon; at eighty-two, he completed a seven-mile combination kayak tour and trail to the waterfall in the Wailua River Valley on Kauaʻi, Hawaii.

== Political activities ==
In 1970, Bernard and then Republican State Representative George E. Nowotny of Fort Smith both considered running for governor had Rockefeller not sought a third term.

Bernard died in Memphis, Tennessee, at the age of eighty-seven, but it is unclear if he was a Memphis resident in his last years. He was cremated. According to his obituary, Bernard "always remained a combination of a small town boy and larger than life figure, making himself big enough for any challenge but always remaining a true Southern gentleman.

Party political offices
Preceded by Kenneth Jones, 1962	Republican U.S. Senate nominee in Arkansas; 1968	Succeeded by John Harris Jones 1974
Preceded by Odell Pollard	Arkansas Republican Party State Chairman; 1971–1973	Succeeded by Jim R. Caldwell
