= John Michael Talbot =

American Catholic singer-songwriter (born 1954)

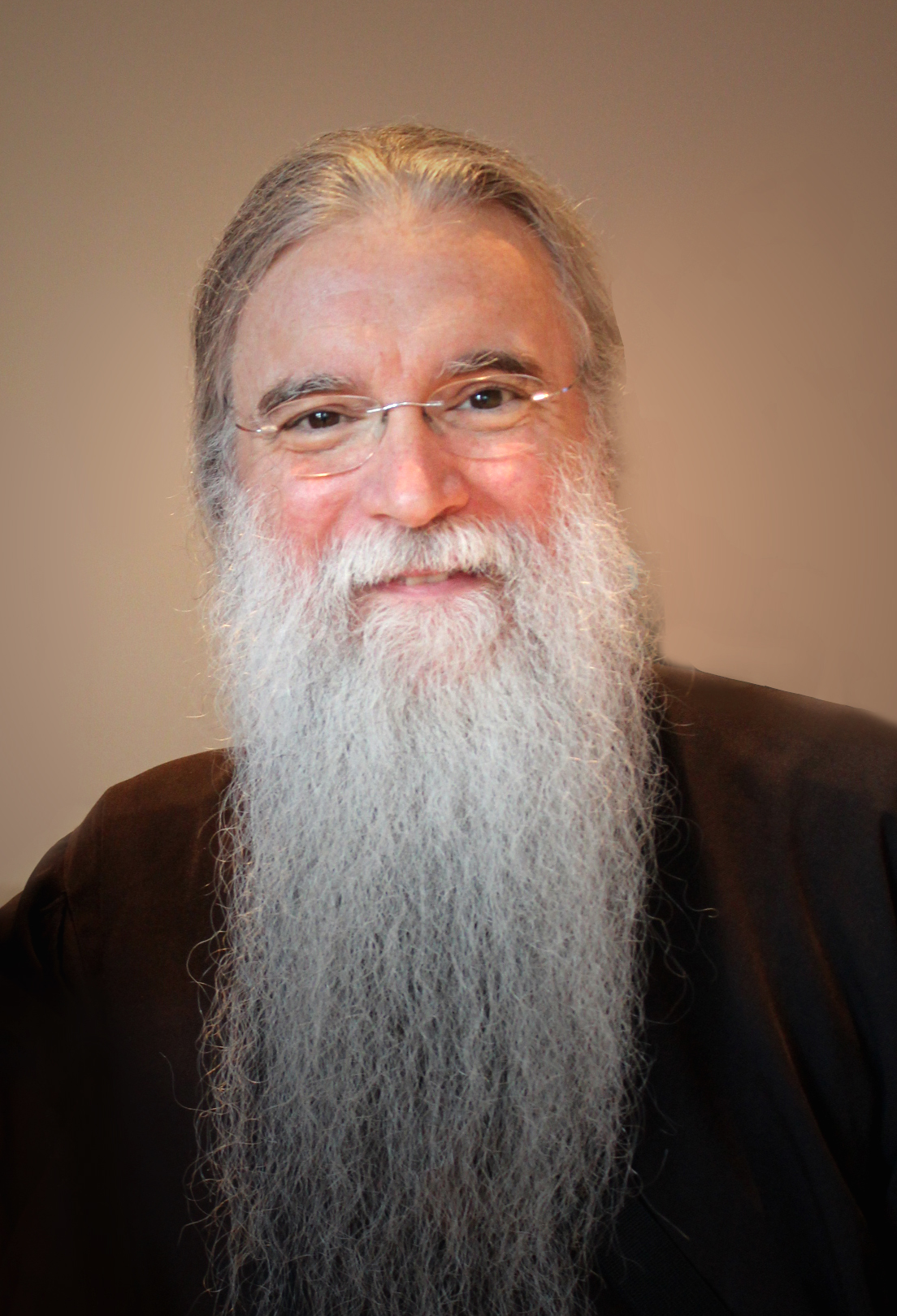
- Talbot in 2014

Background information
- Born: John Michael Talbot; May 8, 1954 (age 72)
- Origin: Oklahoma City, Oklahoma, U.S.
- Genres: Contemporary Christian music, country, folk-rock
- Years active: 1970s–present
- Labels: Sparrow, Troubadour for the Lord
- Website: johnmichaeltalbot.com

John Michael Talbot (born May 8, 1954) is an American Catholic musician, author, television presenter and founder of a monastic community known as the Brothers and Sisters of Charity.

== Life and career ==
Talbot was born into a Methodist family with a musical background in Oklahoma City, Oklahoma, and started learning to play the guitar at an early age. At age 15, he dropped out of school and was performing as a guitarist for Mason Proffit, a country folk-rock band formed with his older brother Terry.

Talbot embarked on a spiritual journey that led him through Native American religion and Buddhism and finally to Christianity. At this point, he and his brother, Terry, joined the Jesus movement and recorded the album Reborn, which was re-released by Sparrow Records (originally released as The Talbot Brothers on the Warner Brothers label). He married his first wife Nancy in 1971.

Two solo albums followed for Talbot: John Michael Talbot (1976) and The New Earth (1977). Both of these were recorded at Golden Voice Recording Studio in South Pekin, Illinois, and produced by Billy Ray Hearn. Reading the life of Saint Francis of Assisi, he was inspired to begin studying at a Franciscan center in Indianapolis. He and his wife divorced, and he became a Catholic and joined the Secular Franciscan Order in 1978. His new beliefs influenced his next solo albums, The Lord's Supper (1979) and its follow-up, Come to the Quiet (1980). In the years that followed, he continually released new albums and became the best-selling artist in the history of Sparrow Records.

He started a house of prayer called "The Little Portion". Talbot moved The Little Portion to Berryville, Arkansas, on land he had purchased during his Mason Proffit days. He founded a community, the Brothers and Sisters of Charity, at Little Portion Hermitage as an "integrated monastic community" with celibate brothers and sisters, singles, and families. By 1989, Talbot had married Viola Pratka (with the permission of the Catholic Church), a former Incarnate Word Sister who had come to the community in 1986.

In accordance with the community's general constitutions, Talbot's title is "General Minister and Spiritual Father". For many years, he has promoted the work of Mercy Corps.

The hermitage suffered a fire in April 2008 in which the chapel, library and many common areas were destroyed. On April 10, 2010, the Bishop of Little Rock, Anthony Taylor, dedicated the new buildings. On October 2, 2010, the Brothers and Sisters of Charity at Little Portion Hermitage celebrated the opening of the new monastery church and common center.

Talbot is the host of an inspirational television program, All Things Are Possible, on The Church Channel which is owned and operated by the Trinity Broadcasting Network.

== See also ==
- Contemporary Catholic liturgical music

== Discography ==
- 1976: John Michael Talbot
- 1977: The New Earth
- 1979: The Lord's Supper
- 1980: Come to the Quiet
- 1980: The Painter
- 1980: Beginnings
- 1981: For the Bride
- 1981: Troubadour of the Great King
- 1982: Light Eternal
- 1983: No Longer Strangers
- 1984: The God of Life
- 1985: The Quiet
- 1986: Be Exalted
- 1986: Empty Canvas
- 1987: Heart of the Shepherd
- 1987: Quiet Reflections
- 1988: The Regathering
- 1988: The Lord's Supper/Be Exalted
- 1988: Songs For Worship Volumes 1 & 2
- 1989: Master Collection V1 - The Quiet Side
- 1989: The Lover and the Beloved
- 1990: Hiding Place
- 1990: The Birth of Jesus: A Celebration of Christmas
- 1991: Come Worship the Lord Vol. 1
- 1991: Come Worship the Lord Vol. 2
- 1992: The Master Musician
- 1993: Meditations In The Spirit
- 1994: Meditations From Solitude
- 1995: Chant From The Hermitage
- 1996: The Early Years
- 1996: Troubadour For The Lord
- 1997: Table of Plenty
- 1997: Pathways To Wisdom
- 1998: Pathways To Solitude
- 1998: Hidden Pathways
- 1998: Sprit Pathways
- 1998: Quiet Pathways
- 1999: Pathways Of The Shepherd
- 1999: Cave Of The Heart
- 2000: Simple Heart
- 2001: Wisdom
- 2003: Signatures
- 2003: The Talbot Brothers Collection
- 2003: Collection
- 2005: City Of God
- 2005: Monk Rock
- 2006: The Ultimate Collection
- 2006: The Beautiful City
- 2007: Living Water
- 2008: The Troubadour Years
- 2011: Worship and Bow Down
- 2013: Audio Teachings from Nothing Is Impossible
- 2016: The Inner Room
- 2020: Songs from Solitude
- 2023: Adoration
- 2024: Late Have I Loved You

== Bibliography ==
=== Books ===
- St. Romuald's Hermitage of the Heart: 40 Days to Peace, Prayer, and the Presence of God — (Book Baby) (2021)
- The Music of Creation: Foundations of a Christian Life — (Tarcher/Putnam) (1999) ISBN 1-58542-037-9
- Changes: A Spiritual Journal — (Troubadour For The Lord) ISBN 1-883803-00-4
- Blessings: Reflections On The Beatitudes — (Crossroads Publishing) ISBN 0-8245-1077-1
- Come to the Quiet: The Principles Of Christian Meditation — (J.P. Tarcher) ISBN 1-58542-144-8
- The Fire of God – (Troubadour for the Lord) ISBN 1-883803-01-2
- Hermitage: A Place Of Prayer & Spiritual Renewal — (Troubadour For The Lord) ISBN 1-57921-040-6
- Simplicity (with Dan O'Neill) ISBN 978-0-89283-635-2
- The Joy of Music Ministry (Resurrection Press) ISBN 1-878718-63-0
- Lessons of St. Francis: Bring Simplicity & Spirituality Into Your Daily Life — (Plume Books) ISBN 0-452-27834-1
- The Lover and the Beloved: A Way Of Franciscan Prayer — (Troubadour For The Lord) ISBN 1-883803-04-7
- Meditations From Solitude: A Mystical Theology From The Christian East — (Troubadour For The Lord) ISBN 1-883803-05-5
- Reflections on the Gospels, Vol. 1: Daily Devotions For Radical Christian Living – (Troubadour for the Lord) ISBN 1-883803-02-0
- Reflections on the Gospels, Vol. 2: Daily Devotions For Radical Christian Living – (Troubadour for the Lord) ISBN 1-883803-03-9
- Reflections on the Gospels, VOL. 3: A Passion For God – (Servant Publications) ISBN 0-89283-705-5
- Signatures (with Dan O'Neill) – (Troubadour for the Lord) ISBN 0-89283-635-0
- The Way of the Mystics: Ancient Wisdom For Today (with Steve Rabey) — (Jossey-Bass)ISBN 0-7879-7572-9
- Reflections on Saint Francis (Liturgical Press) ISBN 978-0-8146-3302-1
- The World Is My Cloister: Living from the Hermit Within (Orbis Books) ISBN 978-1-57075-858-4
- The Universal Monk: The Way of the New Monastic (Liturgical Press) ISBN 978-0-8146-3341-0
- Blessings of Saint Benedict (Liturgical Press) ISBN 978-0-8146-3386-1
- The Jesus Prayer - A Cry For Mercy, A Path of Renewal (Inter-Varsity Press) ISBN 978-0-8308-3577-5
- Nothing Is Impossible With God (Dynamic Catholic) ISBN 978-1-937509-61-3

== Video releases ==
- All Things Are Possible With God (2014, Troubadour for the Lord)
- Nothing Is Impossible (2012, Troubadour for the Lord)
- Live in Concert (2001, Troubadour for the Lord)
- Quiet Reflections (1991, Santa Fe Communications, Inc.)

== Information sources ==
- Troubadour for the Lord: The Story of John Michael Talbot by Dan O'Neill — (Crossroad Publishing) (1983) ISBN 0-8245-0567-0
- Signatures: The Story Of John Michael Talbot by Dan O'Neill — (Troubadour For The Lord) (2004) ISBN 1-883803-10-1 (revised version of his earlier biography "Troubadour for the Lord")
