= Berryville, Arkansas =

Berryville
- City
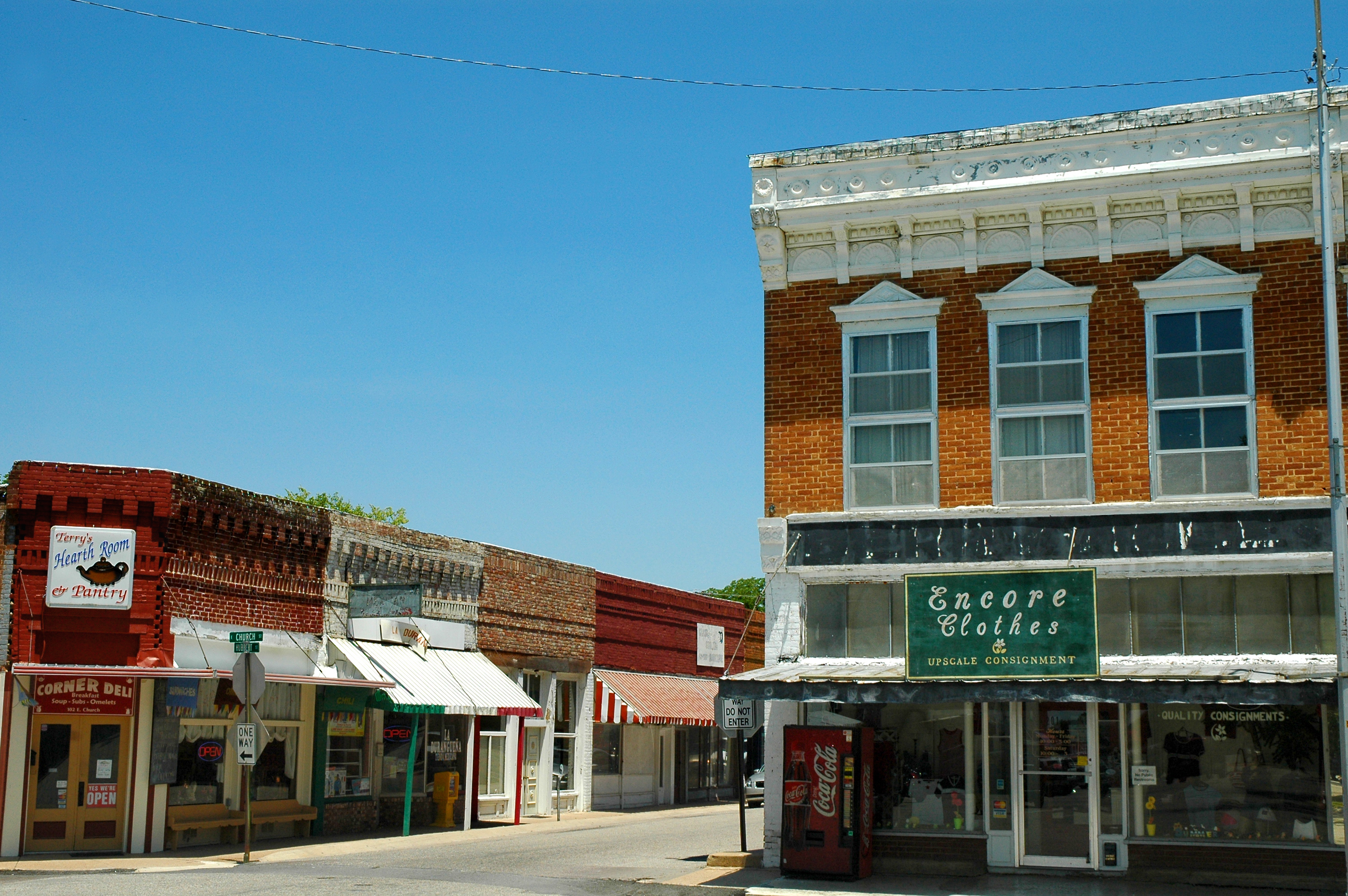
- Berryville Town Square (2006)

- Location of Berryville in Carroll County, Arkansas.
- Coordinates: 36°22′16″N 93°34′13″W
- Country: United States
- State: Arkansas
- County: Carroll
- Founded: 1851

Government
  - Mayor: Tim McKinney

Area
  - Total: 6.15 sq mi (15.93 km^{2})
  - Land: 6.15 sq mi (15.93 km^{2})
  - Water: 0 sq mi (0.00 km^{2})
- Elevation: 1,243 ft (379 m)

Population (2020)
  - Total: 5,682
  - Estimate (2025): 5,813 ▲
  - Density: 924/sq mi (356.7/km^{2})
- Time zone: UTC-6 (CST)
  - Summer (DST): UTC-5 (CDT)
- ZIP code: 72616
- Area code: 870, exchange 423,480
- FIPS code: 05-05560
- GNIS ID: 2403863
- Website: berryvillear.gov

Berryville (/ˈbʌr.əˌvʊl/ BURR-ə-vul) is a city in Carroll County, Arkansas, United States. The population was 5,682 at the 2020 census. making it the largest city in Carroll County. Along with Eureka Springs, it is one of the two county seats of Carroll County.

== History ==
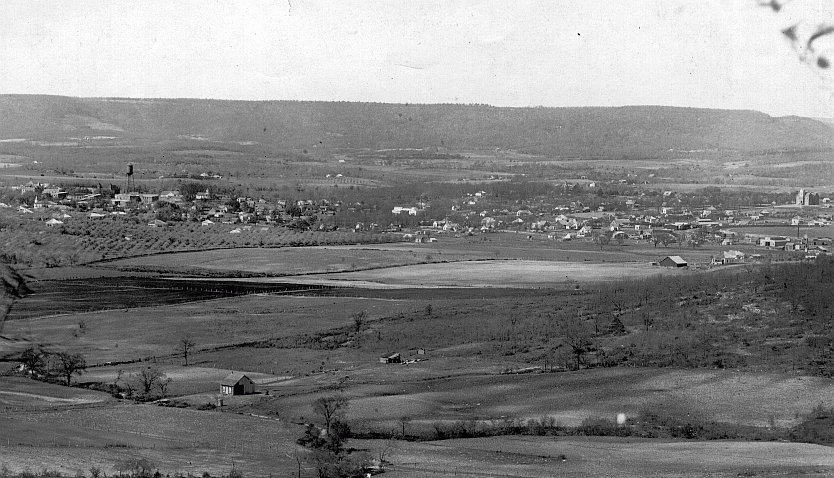
Berryville, 1914

Berryville was founded by local settler Blackburn Henderson Berry in 1850; his nephew James Henderson Berry would become the fourteenth governor of Arkansas in 1883. The city was incorporated in 1876.

== Geography ==
U.S. Route 62 passes through the center of the city, leading east 30 miles (48 km) to Harrison and west 46 miles (74 km) to Rogers. Eureka Springs is 12 miles (19 km) to the west on US 62. Arkansas Highway 21 leads north from Berryville 16 miles (26 km) to the Missouri line.

According to the United States Census Bureau, Berryville has a total area of 6.1 square miles (15.8 km^{2}), all land.

== Demographics ==
Historical population
Census	Pop.	Note	%±
1880	253		—
1890	549		117.0%
1900	551		0.4%
1910	785		42.5%
1920	1,474		87.8%
1930	1,286		−12.8%
1940	1,482		15.2%
1950	1,753		18.3%
1960	1,999		14.0%
1970	2,271		13.6%
1980	2,966		30.6%
1990	3,212		8.3%
2000	4,433		38.0%
2010	5,356		20.8%
2020	5,682		6.1%
2025 (est.)	5,813	▲	2.3%
U.S. Decennial Census; 2014 Estimate

=== 2020 census ===
Berryville racial composition
Race	Number	Percentage
White (non-Hispanic)	3,425	60.28%
Black or African American (non-Hispanic)	15	0.26%
Native American	43	0.76%
Asian	118	2.08%
Pacific Islander	257	4.52%
Other/Mixed	282	4.96%
Hispanic or Latino	1,542	27.14%

As of the 2020 census, Berryville had a population of 5,682. The median age was 34.6 years. 28.0% of residents were under the age of 18 and 15.4% were 65 years of age or older. For every 100 females there were 93.1 males, and for every 100 females age 18 and over there were 91.4 males age 18 and over.

88.9% of residents lived in urban areas, while 11.1% lived in rural areas.

There were 2,082 households in Berryville, of which 37.1% had children under the age of 18 living in them. Of all households, 42.8% were married-couple households, 17.5% were households with a male householder and no spouse or partner present, and 32.0% were households with a female householder and no spouse or partner present. About 28.9% of all households were made up of individuals and 13.4% had someone living alone who was 65 years of age or older. There were 1,269 families residing in the city. There were 2,214 housing units, of which 6.0% were vacant. The homeowner vacancy rate was 1.2% and the rental vacancy rate was 4.3%.

=== 2010 census ===
As of the census of 2010, there were 5,356 people, 1,963 households, and 1,309 families residing in the city. The population density was 879.0 inhabitants per square mile (339.4/km^{2}). There were 2,155 housing units at an average density of 353.3 units per square mile (136.4 units/km^{2}). The racial makeup of the city was 81.7% White, 0.5% Black or African American, 0.8% Native American, 0.9% Asian, 0.4% Native Hawaiian or Pacific Islander, 13.2% some other race, and 2.6% two or more races. 24.7% of the population were Hispanic or Latino of any race.

There were 1,963 households, out of which 38.9% had children under the age of 18 living with them, 45.3% were headed by married couples living together, 14.9% had a female householder with no husband present, and 33.3% were non-families. 28.5% of all households were made up of individuals, and 13.3% were someone living alone who was 65 years of age or older. The average household size was 2.65, and the average family size was 3.26.

In the city, the population was spread out, with 29.0% under the age of 18, 9.8% from 18 to 24, 25.5% from 25 to 44, 21.1% from 45 to 64, and 14.6% who were 65 years of age or older. The median age was 33.5 years. For every 100 females, there were 90.3 males. For every 100 females age 18 and over, there were 86.0 males.

=== Income and poverty ===
For the period 2008–2012, the estimated median annual income for a household in the city was $30,046, and the median income for a family was $37,717. Male full-time workers had a median income of $28,244 versus $24,074 for females. The per capita income for the city was $16,924. About 14.2% of families and 17.4% of the population were below the poverty line, including 17.5% of those under age 18 and 14.8% of those age 65 or over.

== Education ==
Public education for elementary and secondary school students is provided by the Berryville School District, which leads to graduation at Berryville High School.

== Places of interest ==
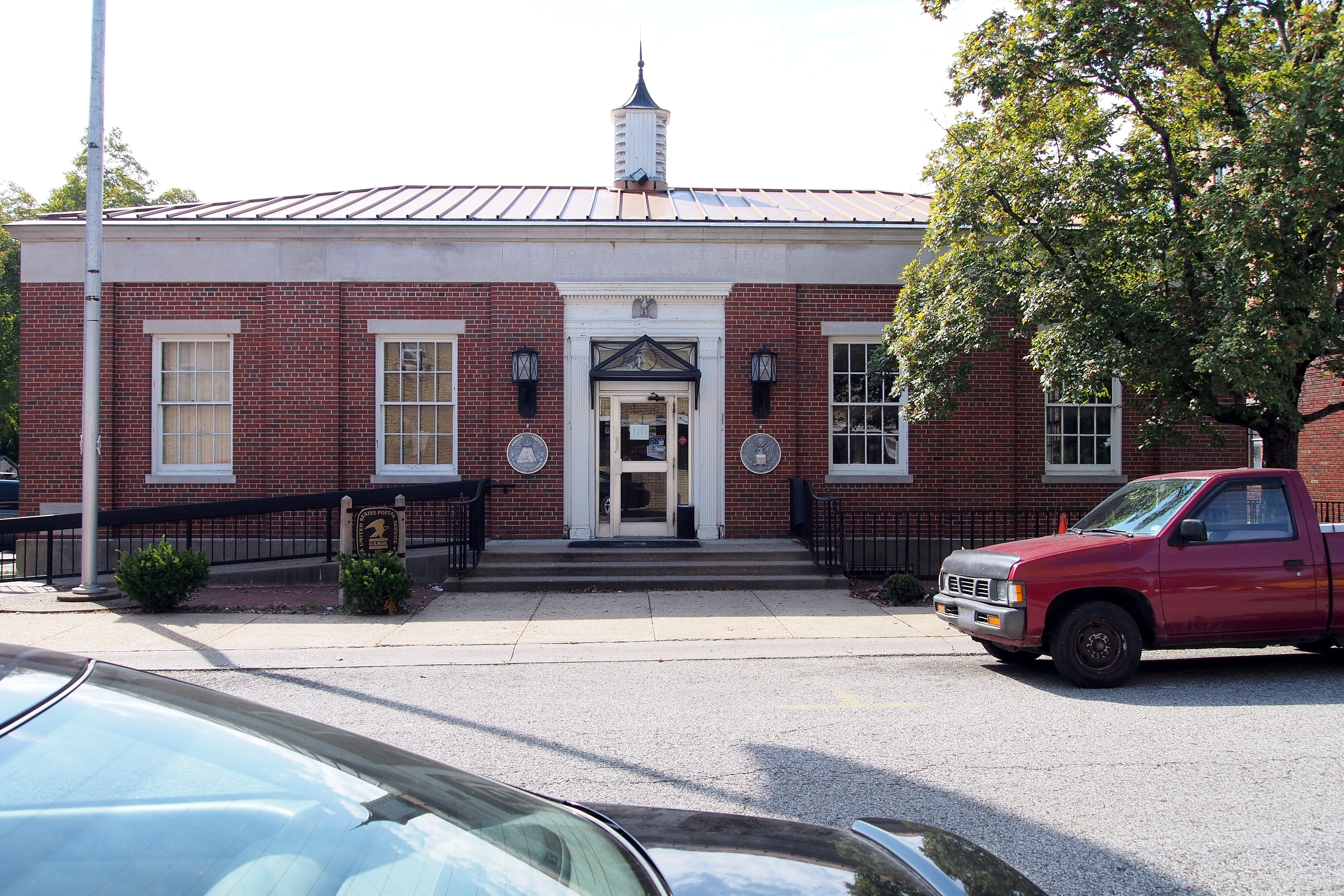
The Berryville Post Office is listed on the National Register of Historic Places.

Saunders' Museum, which has guns used by outlaws such as Pancho Villa, Billy the Kid, and many others, as well as other items of interest, is located in the center of town.

Cosmic Cavern is 7 miles (11 km) north of town on Arkansas Highway 21.

Berryville is the home of handgun manufacturing companies of Nighthawk Custom and Wilson Combat, as well as the International Defensive Pistol Association, a body that sanctions practical shooting competitions that emphasize real-world self-defense scenarios.

Little Portion Hermitage, a community founded by Christian musician John Michael Talbot, is located outside of Berryville.

== Transportation ==
=== Roadways ===
- US 62
- US 62S
- AR 21
- AR 143
- AR 221
- AR 980

=== Transit ===
- Jefferson Lines

== Notable people ==
- Bob Ballinger, Republican member of the Arkansas House of Representatives from District 97 (Carroll, Madison, and Washington counties); resides and maintains law office in Berryville
- James Henderson Berry, U.S. senator, 14th governor of Arkansas
- James William Trimble, former congressman, unseated in 1966 by Republican John Paul Hammerschmidt, a former Berryville lawyer
