= Berryville School District =

School district in Arkansas, United States

Location
- 902 West Timble Ave; Berryville, Arkansas 72616 Northwest Arkansas United States

District information
- Grades: K–12
- Superintendent: Dr. Owen Powell
- Accreditations: ADE; AdvancED
- Schools: 4
- NCES District ID: 0503150

Students and staff
- Students: 1,927
- Teachers: 143.81 (on FTE basis)
- Student–teacher ratio: 13.40
- Athletic conference: 4A Region 1
- District mascot: Bobcat
- Colors: Purple Gold

Other information
- Website: bobcat.k12.ar.us

Berryville School District 27 is a public school district based in Berryville, Arkansas, United States. The Berryville School District provides early childhood, elementary and secondary education for more than 1,900 kindergarten through grade 12 students at its four facilities.

Berryville School District and all of its schools are accredited by the Arkansas Department of Education (ADE) and AdvancED.

== History ==
In 1966 the Carroll County School District dissolved with a piece going to the Berryville district.

== Schools ==
- Berryville High School—grades 9 through 12.
- Berryville Middle School—grades 6 through 8.
- Berryville Intermediate School—grades 3 through 5.
- Berryville Elementary School—prekindergarten through grade 2.
