= Ben C. Henley =

American lawyer (1907–1987)

Benjamin Charles Henley

Arkansas Republican Party State Chairman
- In office 1955–1962
- Preceded by: Osro Cobb
- Succeeded by: William L. Spicer

Personal details
- Born: October 7, 1907 St. Joe, Searcy County; Arkansas, USA
- Died: November 25, 1987 (aged 80) Harrison, Arkansas
- Resting place: Henley Cemetery in St. Joe, Arkansas
- Spouse: Jewel Ivie Henley
- Relations: Jesse Smith Henley (brother)
- Education: University of Arkansas School of Law
- Occupation: Attorney; Businessman

Benjamin Charles Henley (October 7, 1907 – November 25, 1987) was an American lawyer and businessman from Harrison in Boone County in northwestern Arkansas, who was the chairman of his state's Republican Party from 1955 to 1962.

== Biography ==
He graduated from the University of Arkansas School of Law in Fayetteville. He tutored an aunt by marriage, Mary Elizabeth Smith Massey (1900–1971), in the study of law. Massey became one of the first women lawyers in Arkansas. In 1934, she ran on the Republican ticket for county/circuit clerk in Henley's native Searcy County, was elected, and served three terms in the position. As an appointed city attorney in 1935, she developed the blueprint for the water city system in Marshall, Arkansas, and campaigned for a bond issue to finance the project.

As the state party chairman, Henley was a delegate to the 1956 and the 1960 Republican national conventions held in San Francisco and Chicago, respectively. In 1956, as his party's unsuccessful nominee for the United States Senate against the Democrat J. William Fulbright, Henley finished with 17 percent of the vote, well behind his party's presidential nominee, Dwight D. Eisenhower, who still lost Arkansas in the second race against Adlai E. Stevenson, II, of Illinois. Henley did not actively campaign against the politically entrenched Fulbright, who instead was out of state working for the Stevenson campaign, which was managed by the Arkansas journalist Harry S. Ashmore. Fulbright received 331,679 votes to Henley's 68,016.

In addition to his legal practice, Henley was part-owner, with later Harrison Mayor Bob Reynolds, of Walters Dry Goods Company at the intersection of Main and Stephenson streets in Harrison, the only local dealer of Levi's jeans. In May 1961, the store was completely flooded by heavy rains, and virtually all of the mud-soaked merchandise was lost. The facility, which carried no flood insurance, was refurbished through a loan from the Small Business Administration. Walters has since passed into history, and another business, Leflers, moved into that location.

Henley's younger brother, Jesse Smith Henley, was a long-term judge of the U.S. district and Court of Appeals for the Eighth Circuit for whom the federal building in Harrison is named.

Party political offices
Vacant Title last held by Victor M. Wade	Republican nominee for U.S. Senator from Arkansas (Class 3); 1956	Succeeded by Kenneth Jones
Preceded by Osro Cobb	Arkansas Republican Party State Chairman; 1955–1962	Succeeded by William L. Spicer
