= James William Trimble =

American politician (1894–1972)

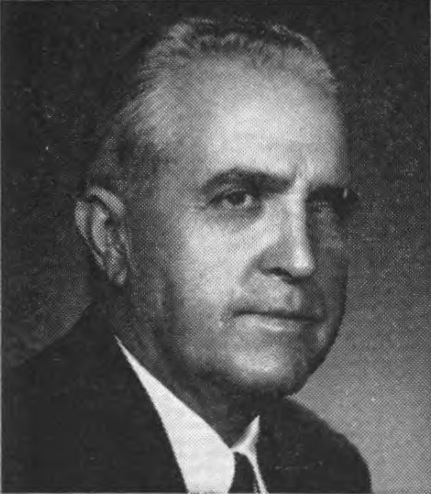

Member of the U.S. House of Representatives from Arkansas's 3rd district
- In office January 3, 1945 – January 3, 1967
- Preceded by: J. William Fulbright
- Succeeded by: John Paul Hammerschmidt

Prosecuting attorney for the 4th Judicial District of Arkansas
- In office 1930–1938

Judge of the 4th Judicial District of Arkansas
- In office 1938–1944

Personal details
- Born: February 3, 1894 Osage, Arkansas, U.S.
- Died: March 10, 1972 (aged 78) Eureka Springs, Arkansas, U.S.
- Resting place: Berryville Memorial Park in Berryville, Arkansas
- Party: Democratic
- Education: University of Arkansas at Fayetteville
- Occupation: Lawyer

Military service
- Branch/service: United States Army
- Rank: Private in Adjutant General's Office
- Battles/wars: World War I

James William Trimble (February 3, 1894 – March 10, 1972) was a liberal Democratic member of the United States House of Representatives from Arkansas, having served from 1945 to 1967. He was the first Democrat in Arkansas since Reconstruction to lose a congressional race to a Republican. Trimble was unseated in the 1966 general election by state GOP chairman John Paul Hammerschmidt of Harrison in Boone County, who won election on the ticket headed by gubernatorial nominee Winthrop Rockefeller.

Born in tiny Osage in Carroll County in northwestern Arkansas, Trimble attended public schools. He was graduated in 1917 from the University of Arkansas at Fayetteville. He was admitted to the bar in 1925 and commenced practice in Berryville in Carroll County.

During World War I, he served in the United States Army as a private and was assigned to the Adjutant General's Office in Little Rock. From 1920 to 1928, he was a county official of Carroll County. He served as prosecuting attorney of the 4th Judicial Circuit of Arkansas from 1930 to 1938. He served as judge of the 4th Judicial Circuit of Arkansas from 1938 to 1944, when he was elected to the U.S. House.

Trimble was elected as a Democrat to the Seventy-ninth and to the ten succeeding Congresses (January 3, 1945 – January 3, 1967). In the 1944 general election he defeated the Republican Tom Sullins of Fayetteville, 63.3 to 36.7 percent. In 1956, Trimble defeated the Republican William L. Spicer of Fort Smith, later the chairman of the Arkansas Republican Party, by a vote of 61-39 percent. He was a signatory to the 1956 Southern Manifesto that opposed the desegregation of public schools ordered by the Supreme Court in Brown v. Board of Education.

Trimble was the chairman of the Special Committee on Chamber Improvements (Eighty-first and Eighty-second Congresses). He was an unsuccessful candidate for reelection in 1966 to the Ninetieth Congress.

Trimble resided in Berryville and died in Eureka Springs. He is interred at Berryville Memorial Park in Berryville.

U.S. House of Representatives
Preceded by J. William Fulbright	Member of the U.S. House of Representatives from Arkansas's 3rd congressional district 1945–1967	Succeeded by John P. Hammerschmidt
