= Berryville High School =

Location
- 902 West Trimble Avenue; Berryville, Arkansas 72616; United States
- Coordinates: 36°22′10″N 93°34′29″W

Information
- School type: Public comprehensive
- Status: Open
- School district: Berryville School District
- CEEB code: 040185
- NCES School ID: 050315000080
- Teaching staff: 77.85 (on FTE basis)
- Grades: 9–12
- Enrollment: 553 (2023-2024)
- Student to teacher ratio: 7.10
- Education system: ADE Smart Core
- Classes offered: Regular, Advanced Placement (AP)
- Colors: Purple and gold
- Athletics conference: 4A Region 1
- Mascot: Bobcat
- Team name: Berryville Bobcats
- Accreditation: ADE
- Feeder to: Berryville Middle School (6–8)
- Affiliation: Arkansas Activities Association
- Website: bhs.bobcat.k12.ar.us

Berryville High School is a comprehensive public high school for students in grades 9 through 12 located in Berryville, Arkansas, United States. Berryville High School is the only high school of the Berryville School District and the largest of three public high schools in Carroll County.

== Academics ==
The assumed course of study follows the Smart Core curriculum developed by the Arkansas Department of Education (ADE), which requires students complete at least 22 units prior to graduation. Students complete regular coursework and exams and may take Advanced Placement (AP) courses and exam with the opportunity to receive college credit.

== Athletics ==
The high school emblem (mascot) of the Bobcat and colors of purple and gold have been shared by all schools in the district.

The Berryville Bobcats compete in interscholastic activities within the 4A Classification administered by the Arkansas Activities Association. The Bobcats play within the 4A Region 1 Conference. Berryville fields varsity teams in soccer (boys/girls) football, golf (boys/girls), basketball (boys/girls), cross country (boys/girls), cheer, baseball, fastpitch softball, track and field (boys/girls).

The Berryville Bobcats cross country teams are one of the state's most successful with 19 boys' state championships, including nine consecutive titles from 1971-80. The girls' cross country teams have won seven girls' state championships between 1980 and 1992, including six consecutive titles (1997–2002).

The Berryville Bobcats and their rivals, The Green Forest Tigers hold an annual competition known as the Carroll County Super Bowl. It is held on the same day as a chili competition known as the "Carroll County Souper Bowl"

Former football head coach Ron Clark won 211 games at Berryville between 1964 and 1994.
