= Little Portion Hermitage =

Catholic hermitage in Berryville, Arkansas

Coordinates: 36.4512°N 93.6622°W

The Brothers and Sisters of Charity at Little Portion Hermitage is a Catholic religious order made up of an integrated monastic expression of celibate brothers, celibate sisters, families and singles, and a domestic expression of those who live throughout the world in their own homes. It is the first Vatican sanctioned self-supported indigenous religious community in the United States.

The Brothers and Sisters of Charity, a Public Association of the Faithful, was founded by John Michael Talbot in 1980.

Most of the members of the monastic expression live at the Little Portion Hermitage in Berryville, Arkansas. In 2012, a second house was opened in Houston, Texas. There is also an international ecumenical domestic expression consisting of single men and women and families, living in their own homes and sharing the same Rule and Constitution with the monastic expression. The monastic mission foundation on the island of Ometepe in Central America currently includes both monastic and domestic members.
