= Hatton, Arkansas =

- Unincorporated community
- Location within Arkansas Location within the United States
- Coordinates: 34°21′30″N 94°22′19″W
- Country: United States
- State: Arkansas
- County: Polk
- Elevation: 1,194 ft (364 m)
- Time zone: UTC-6 (Central (CST))
  - Summer (DST): UTC-5 (CDT)
- Area code: 479
- GNIS feature ID: 57899

Hatton is an unincorporated community in Polk County, Arkansas, United States.

== Notable person ==
- Osro Cobb, lawyer and politician, was born near Hatton.
