= John Paul Hammerschmidt Federal Building =

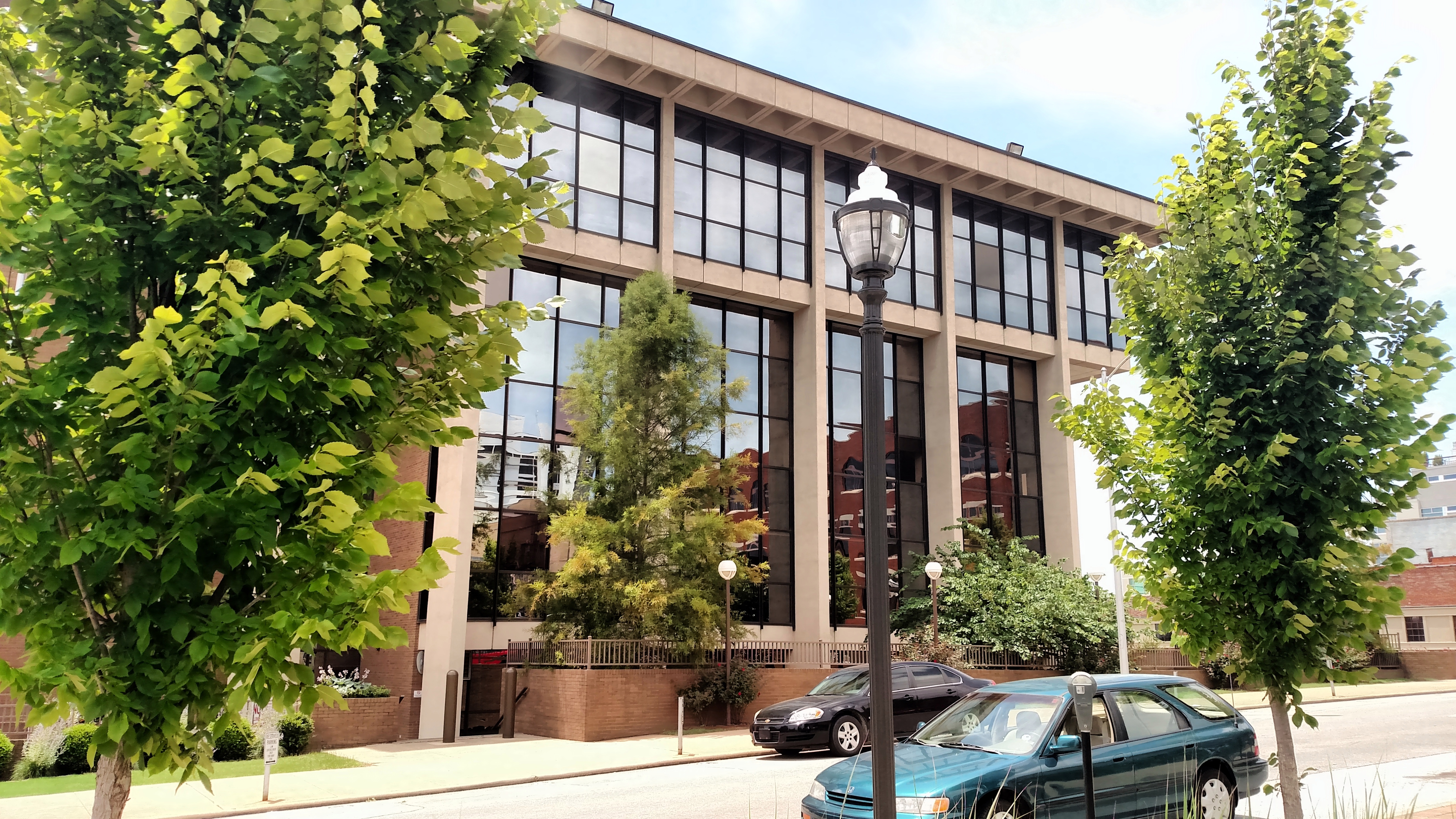
- Interactive map of the John Paul Hammerschmidt Federal Building area
- Etymology: Public Law 102-446

General information
- Status: Open
- Type: Office building
- Location: 35 East Mountain Street, Fayetteville, Arkansas
- Coordinates: 36.061586°N 94.158599°W
- Named for: Rep. John Paul Hammerschmidt
- Owner: United States of America
- Affiliation: United States District Court for the Western District of Arkansas

The John Paul Hammerschmidt Federal Building, located 1/2 block off the Fayetteville Historic Square in downtown Fayetteville, Arkansas is home to the Fayetteville division of the United States District Court for the Western District of Arkansas.

The 102nd United States Congress Bill H.R.5432 became Public Law 102-446 October 23, 1992: "To designate the Federal building and United States courthouse located at the corner of College Avenue and Mountain Street in Fayetteville, Arkansas, as the 'John Paul Hammerschmidt Federal Building and United States Courthouse'."

== About John Paul Hammerschmidt ==
John Paul Hammerschmidt was born May 4, 1922 in Harrison, Boone County, Arkansas. He attended The Citadel in South Carolina and University of Arkansas. He enlisted in the Army Air Corps, was commissioned as a second lieutenant and served as a combat pilot during World War II. Hammerschmidt was awarded the Air Medal with four oak leaf clusters, the Distinguished Flying Cross with three oak leaf clusters, three Battle Stars and the China War Memorial Medal by the government of the Republic of China. He served 13 terms in Congress from 1967 to 1993 and was the first Republican in Arkansas to win a federal election in the 20th century. Hammerschmidt died April 1, 2015.
