= Odell Pollard =

American lawyer and politician (1927–2015)

Chairman of the Arkansas Republican Party
- In office 1966–1970
- Preceded by: John P. Hammerschmidt
- Succeeded by: Charles T. Bernard

Personal details
- Born: April 29, 1927 Union Hill, Arkansas, U.S.
- Died: March 12, 2015 (aged 87) Searcy, Arkansas, U.S.
- Party: Republican
- Other political affiliations: Democratic (until 1956)
- Education: University of Arkansas School of Law

Odell Pollard (April 29, 1927 – March 12, 2015) was a lawyer and politician in Arkansas. He switched from being a Democrat to becoming a member of the Republican Party. In the 1960s, he chaired the Arkansas Republican Party. In 1967, he addressed the Urban League of Little Rock. He had a law firm in Searcy, Arkansas, and for many years worked to transform Arkansas from a Democratic stronghold into a two-party state. He was a liberal Republican and a close ally of Winthrop Rockefeller.

He was born in Union Hill, Arkansas. He graduated from University of Arkansas School of Law in 1950.
