= Southern Trust Building =

- U.S. National Register of Historic Places
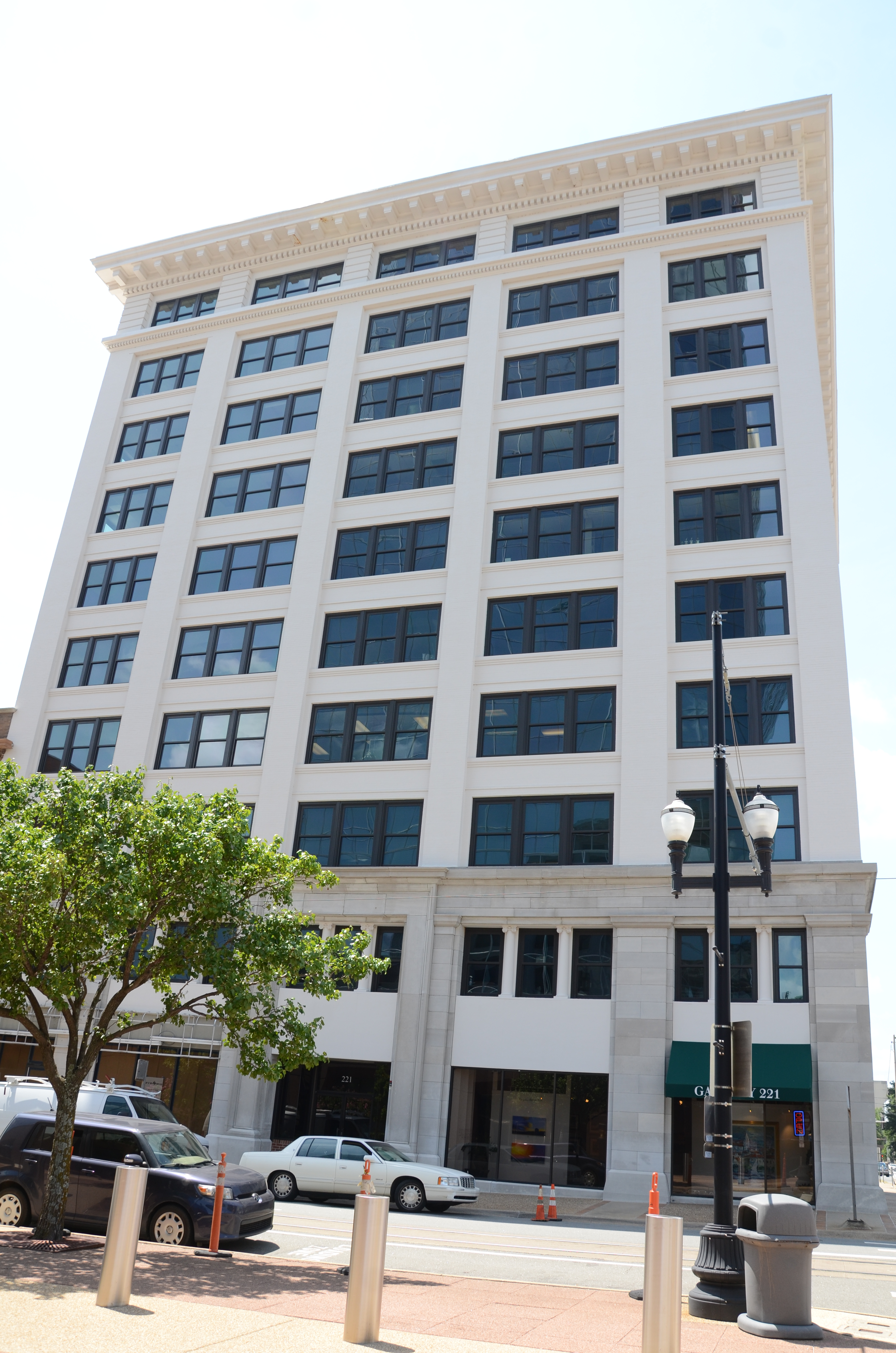

- Location within Arkansas Location within the United States
- Location: 221 W. 2nd St., Little Rock, Arkansas
- Coordinates: 34°44′50″N 92°16′20″W
- Area: less than one acre
- Built: 1906
- NRHP reference No.: 13000790
- Added to NRHP: September 26, 2013

The Southern Trust Building, also known as Pyramid Place, is a historic commercial building at 221 West 2nd Street in Little Rock, Arkansas. It is a ten-story steel, concrete and glass U-shaped structure, built in 1906–07 to a design by George R. Mann, designer of the Arkansas State Capitol. It was the city's first skyscraper, and the tallest building in the state at the time of its construction. It is an early example of what became known later as curtain wall construction.

The building was listed on the National Register of Historic Places in 2013.

== See also ==
- National Register of Historic Places listings in Little Rock, Arkansas
