= John Paul Hammerschmidt =

American politician (1922-2015)

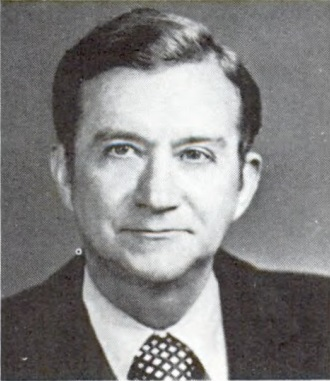

Member of the U.S. House of Representatives from Arkansas's 3rd district
- In office January 3, 1967 – January 3, 1993
- Preceded by: James William Trimble
- Succeeded by: Tim Hutchinson

Chairman of the Arkansas Republican Party
- In office 1964–1966
- Preceded by: William L. Spicer
- Succeeded by: Odell Pollard
- In office 2002–2004
- Preceded by: Lloyd Vance Stone Jr.
- Succeeded by: Winthrop Paul Rockefeller

Republican National Committeeman from Arkansas
- In office 1976–1980
- Preceded by: Odell Pollard
- Succeeded by: A. Lynn Lowe

Personal details
- Born: May 4, 1922 Harrison, Arkansas, U.S.
- Died: April 1, 2015 (aged 92) Springdale, Arkansas, U.S.
- Party: Republican
- Spouse: Virginia Ann Sharp (m. 1948; died 2006)
- Children: 1
- Education: Oklahoma State University (BS)
- Occupation: Lumberman; entrepreneur

Military service
- Allegiance: United States
- Branch/service: U.S. Army Air Corps; United States Air Force Reserve; District of Columbia Army Reserves
- Years of service: 1942–1945 (Army Air Corps); 1945–1960 (Reserves); 1977–1981 (Army Reserves)
- Battles/wars: World War II (South-East Asian theatre)
- Awards: Distinguished Flying Cross with three Oak leaf clusters
- John Paul Hammerschmidt's voice John Paul Hammerschmidt speaks in support of the Intermodal Surface Transportation Efficiency Act; Recorded October 23, 1991

John Paul Hammerschmidt (May 4, 1922 – April 1, 2015) was an American politician from the U.S. state of Arkansas. A member of the Republican Party, he served 13 terms in the United States House of Representatives for Arkansas's 3rd congressional district, located in the northwestern quadrant of the state. He served from 1967 until his retirement in 1993.

In 1974, a nationally Democratic year, he secured his fifth term by defeating the then 28-year-old Bill Clinton. He was also the first Republican elected to the House of Representatives from Arkansas since Reconstruction. Coincidentally, Hammerschmidt left the House the same month in which Clinton became president.

== Early life and business career ==
Born in Harrison in Boone County in northwestern Arkansas, Hammerschmidt was the fourth of five children of the former Junie Mildred Taylor and Arthur Paul Hammerschmidt. Both sets of grandparents migrated to Boone County in the early years of the 20th century and were of German descent. He graduated in 1938 from Harrison High School.

He attended The Citadel in Charleston, South Carolina, from 1938 to 1939 and the University of Arkansas in Fayetteville from 1940 to 1941.

Hammerschmidt served in the United States Army Air Corps during World War II. In 1942, he joined the 3rd Combat Cargo Group of the U.S. Army Air Corps and served in the China-Burma-India theater until the end of the war in 1945. Hammerschmidt received the Distinguished Flying Cross with three oak leaf clusters for his service in the war.

Hammerschmidt returned to the United States and attended Oklahoma A&M College (now Oklahoma State University) in Stillwater, Oklahoma, from 1945 to 1946, having received a Bachelor of Science degree. He then entered the lumber industry, working at the Hammerschmidt Lumber Company, which had been founded by his grandfather, and becoming its president. Hammerschmidt also was president of the Construction Products Company and the Arkansas Lumber Dealers Association and Southwestern Lumberman's Association.

Hammerschmidt continued his military service in the United States Air Force Reserves from 1945 to 1960, and later in the District of Columbia Army Reserves from 1977 to 1981.

== Political career ==
Hammerschmidt was a delegate to the Republican National Conventions in 1964, 1968, 1972, 1976, 1980, 1984, and 1988. He was twice the state chairman of the Republican Party of Arkansas, serving from 1964 to 1966 and again from 2002 to 2004.

In the 1966 election, Hammerschmidt won the Republican nomination for the 3rd district and then defeated 11-term incumbent Democrat James William Trimble, by more than nine thousand votes. He became the first Republican to represent Arkansas in Congress since Reconstruction. Hammerschmidt was elected twelve more times, having served twenty-six years from January 3, 1967 to January 3, 1993, from the 90th Congress to the 102nd Congress. The 3rd district had begun shaking off its Solid South roots before the rest of Arkansas; it has only supported a Democrat for president twice since 1952, and its voters had begun splitting their tickets at the federal level as early as the 1930s.

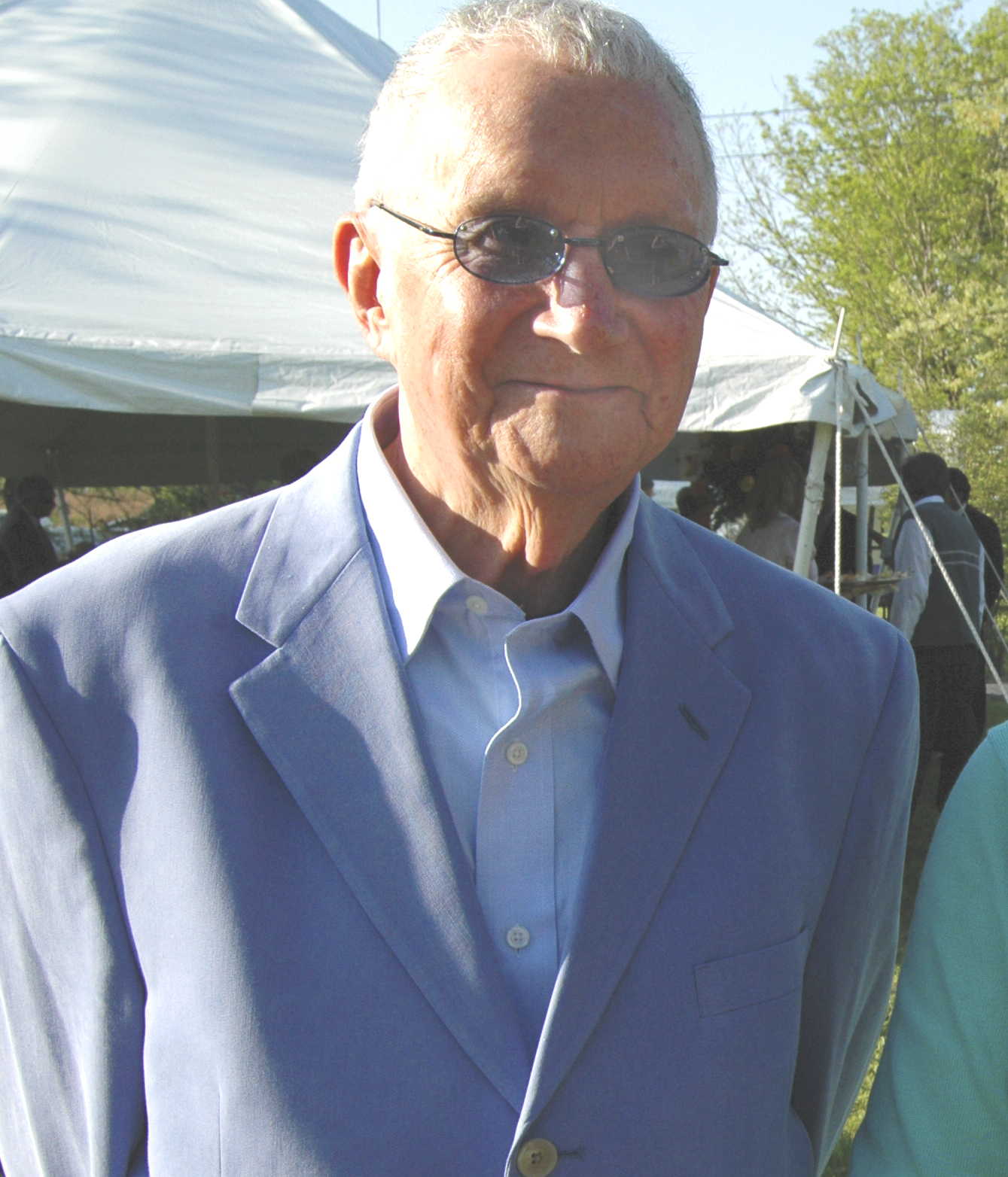
Hammerschmidt in 2007

Hammerschmidt became very popular in the 3rd district, even though most of its residents had never been represented by a Republican before; indeed, Democrats would hold most state and local offices well into the 1990s. He only faced one contest anywhere near as close as his initial bid for the seat. In the 1974 election, he defeated Bill Clinton (then a University of Arkansas law professor) by only 6,400 votes. Clinton had harshly criticized Hammerschmidt for being one of the few Republicans to stand by Richard Nixon in the wake of the Watergate scandal. This election was one of only four in which Democrats received more than one-third of the vote against Hammerschmidt, the others being Hardy Croxton in 1968, Donald Poe in 1970, and former Clinton associate James McDougal in 1982. The district reverted to form in 1976, when Hammerschmidt was reelected unopposed. In 1978, Hammerschmidt faced weak opposition from the Hot Springs real estate broker William C. Mears and instead had the resources to help the Republican gubernatorial nominee, A. Lynn Lowe, a farmer from Texarkana, win in Boone County. Lowe, who was also the state party chairman, lost to Hammerschmidt's former opponent, Bill Clinton, by a margin of 63%–37%.

Hammerschmidt was a member of the President's Commission on Aviation Security and Terrorism (PCAST) which was organized in September 1989 to review and report on aviation security policy in the light of the sabotage of Pan Am Flight 103 on December 21, 1988.

Hammerschmidt had a conservative voting record on foreign policy and social issues, but a slightly more moderate record on economic issues. He supported a constitutional amendment proposing to enact flag desecration laws.

Hammerschmidt did not vote on the Abandoned Shipwrecks Act of 1987.

Hammerschmidt was in the Air Force Reserve from 1945 to 1960 and the Army Reserve from 1977 to 1981. He was a Presbyterian and a member of the American Legion, Veterans of Foreign Wars, Freemasons, Shriners, Elks, Rotary International, and had alumni status at the Alpha Zeta chapter of the Pi Kappa Alpha fraternity at the University of Arkansas at Fayetteville. From 1999 to 2004, he was a trustee of Arkansas State University at Jonesboro. His wife, Virginia Ann Sharp, died on January 2, 2006 at the age of 77, following 58 years of marriage. Hammerschmidt died at the age of 92 of heart and respiratory failure at a hospital in Springdale, Arkansas.

== Legacy ==
A fellowship at the University of Arkansas at Fort Smith was created in his name to allow a university student to work in the 3rd congressional district office.

The John Paul Hammerschmidt Federal Building near the Fayetteville Historic Square is home to the Fayetteville office of the United States District Court for the Western District of Arkansas.

Interstate 49 in Arkansas is designated as the John Paul Hammerschmidt Highway in northwest Arkansas.

Hammerschmidt was inducted into the Arkansas Aviation Hall of Fame in 1990 by the Arkansas Aviation Historical Society.

UA Northark in Harrison, Arkansas, formerly North Arkansas College, hosts the John Paul Hammerschmidt Lecture Series. Beginning in 1999, the Lecture Series features notable speakers from varied backgrounds and disciplines. The Lecture Series is free and open to the public.

U.S. House of Representatives
| Preceded by James William Trimble | Member of the U.S. House of Representatives from Arkansas's 3rd congressional district 1967–1993 | Succeeded by Tim Hutchinson |
| Preceded by Charles M. Teague | Ranking Member of the House Veterans' Affairs Committee; 1973–1987 | Succeeded by Gerald Solomon |
| Preceded by Gene Snyder | Ranking Member of the House Public Works and Transportation Committee; 1987–1993 | Succeeded by Bud Shuster |
Party political offices
| Preceded by William L. Spicer | Chairman of the Arkansas Republican Party; 1964–1966 | Succeeded by Odell Pollard |
| Preceded by Odell Pollard | Republican National Committeeman from Arkansas; 1976–1980 | Succeeded by Lynn Lowe |
| Preceded by Lloyd Vance Stone Jr. | Chairman of the Arkansas Republican Party; 2002–2004 | Succeeded by Winthrop Paul Rockefeller |
