= 1968 Arkansas gubernatorial election =

- November 5, 1968
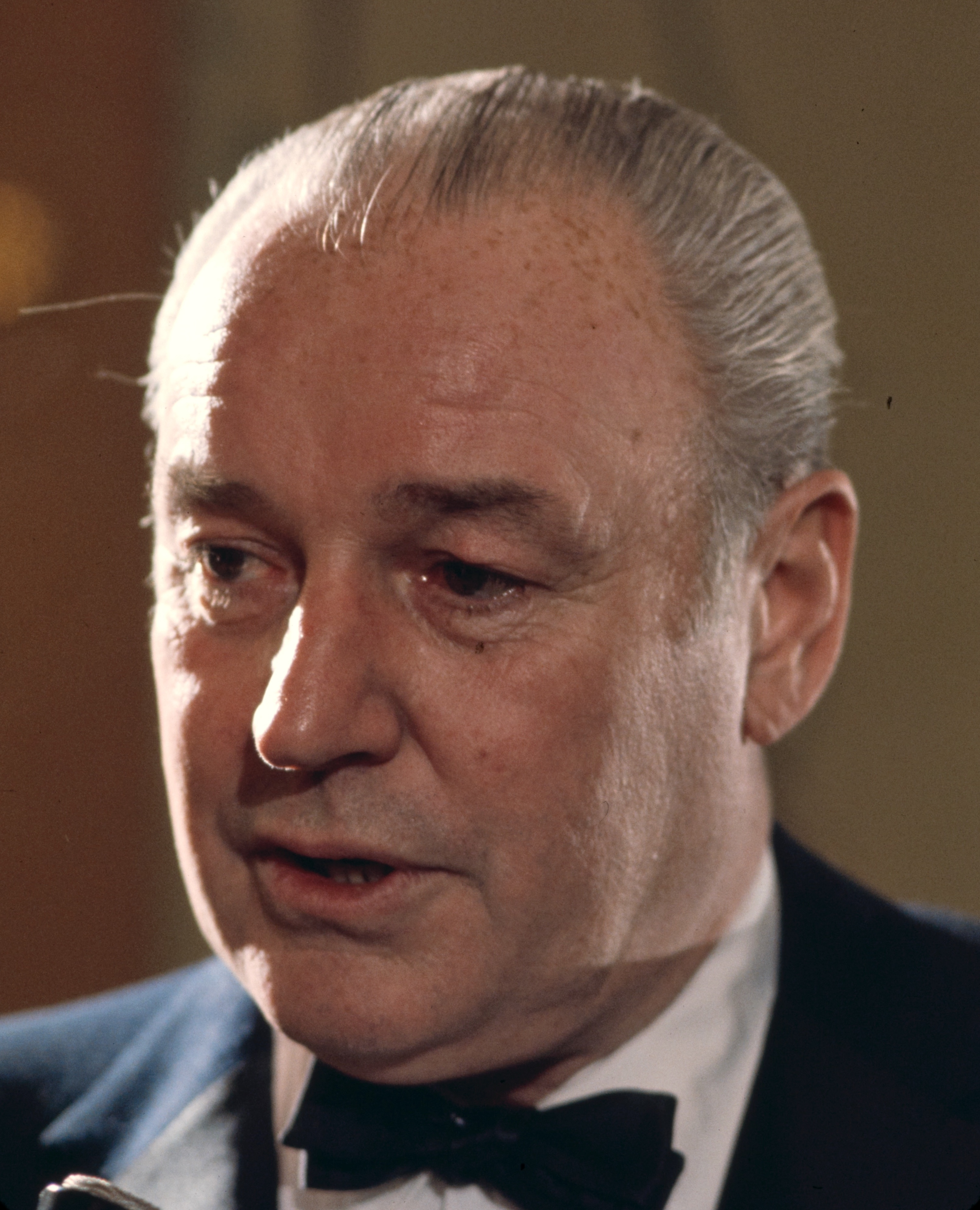

Nominee	Winthrop Rockefeller	Marion H. Crank
Party	Republican	Democratic
Popular vote	322,782	292,813
Percentage	52.43%	47.57%
- County results Rockefeller: 50–60% 60–70% 70–80% Crank: 50–60% 60–70% 70–80%
Governor before election
Winthrop Rockefeller
Republican
Elected Governor
Winthrop Rockefeller
Republican

The 1968 Arkansas gubernatorial election was held in the U.S. state on November 5, when incumbent Republican Winthrop Rockefeller defeated former speaker of the Arkansas House of Representatives Marion Crank by a small margin. Rockefeller was first elected in 1966, and was the first Republican to hold the office since Reconstruction. This was the first time a Republican was re-elected as governor of Arkansas, and would be the only time until 2002.

As of 2022, this is the last time that Chicot County and St. Francis County voted for the Republican candidate.

== Background ==
Probably due to the crowded Democratic primary and allegations of nepotism cast upon Crank, aided by the recent full enfranchisement of African Americans who supported Rockefeller and his liberal reforms Rockefeller prevailed with a clear majority, though a reduced one, compared to his 1966 margin.

Virginia Johnson was the wife of former Arkansas Supreme Court Justice James D. Johnson who, concurrently with her candidacy, unsuccessfully sought the Democratic nomination against J. William Fulbright in the Senate election.

== Democratic primary ==
Candidates:

- Marion H. Crank, state representative, former house speaker, and president of Foreman Cement Company
- Virginia Johnson, legal secretary and wife of James D. "Justice Jim" Johnson, Democratic nominee for governor in 1966
- Ted Boswell, attorney
- Bruce Bennett, former attorney general
- Frank Whitbeck, insurance executive
- Clyde Byrd, state senator

Arkansas Democratic primary
Party	Candidate	Votes	%
Democratic	Marion H. Crank	106,092	25.57
Democratic	Virginia Johnson	86,038	20.74
Democratic	Ted Boswell	86,629	20.64
Democratic	Bruce Bennett	65,095	15.69
Democratic	Frank Whitbeck	61,758	14.89
Democratic	Clyde E. Byrd	10,265	2.47

=== Runoff ===
Arkansas Democratic primary runoff
Party	Candidate	Votes	%
Democratic	Marion H. Crank	215,087	63.27
Democratic	Virginia Johnson	124,880	36.73

== Election results ==
Arkansas gubernatorial election, 1968
Party	Candidate	Votes	%	±%
Republican	Winthrop Rockefeller (incumbent)	322,782	52.43	−1.93%
Democratic	Marion Crank	292,813	47.57	+1.93%
Total votes		615,595	100.00	
