= Governor Rockefeller =

Governor Rockefeller may refer to:

- Jay Rockefeller (1937–2026), 29th Governor of West Virginia, nephew of Nelson Rockefeller and Winthrop Rockefeller.
- Nelson Rockefeller (1908–1979), 49th Governor of New York, brother of Winthrop Rockefeller.
- Winthrop Rockefeller (1912–1973), 37th Governor of Arkansas
