= Noblestown, Pennsylvania =

Unincorporated community in Pennsylvania, US

- Census-designated place
- Location in Allegheny County and state of Pennsylvania
- Coordinates: 40°23′43″N 80°12′7″W
- Country: United States
- State: Pennsylvania
- County: Allegheny
- Townships: North Fayette, South Fayette

Area
  - Total: 1.21 sq mi (3.13 km^{2})
  - Land: 1.21 sq mi (3.13 km^{2})
  - Water: 0 sq mi (0.00 km^{2})

Population (2020)
  - Total: 797
  - Density: 659.8/sq mi (254.76/km^{2})
- Time zone: UTC-5 (Eastern (EST))
  - Summer (DST): UTC-4 (EDT)
- FIPS code: 42-54568

Noblestown is a census-designated place (CDP) in Allegheny County, Pennsylvania, United States. The community was part of the Sturgeon-Noblestown CDP before later splitting into two separate CDPs in 2010, becoming Sturgeon and Noblestown. The population of Noblestown was 797 at the 2020 census.

== Geography ==
Noblestown is located at 40°23′43″N 80°12′7″W (40.3955, -80.2019).

According to the United States Census Bureau, the CDP has a total area of 1.2 square miles (3.1 km^{2}), all land.

== Demographics ==
Historical population
Census	Pop.	Note	%±
2010	575		—
2020	797		38.6%
U.S. Decennial Census

== Education ==
Areas in North Fayette Township are in the West Allegheny School District while areas in South Fayette Township are in the South Fayette Township School District.
