= Bobo Rockefeller =

American actress

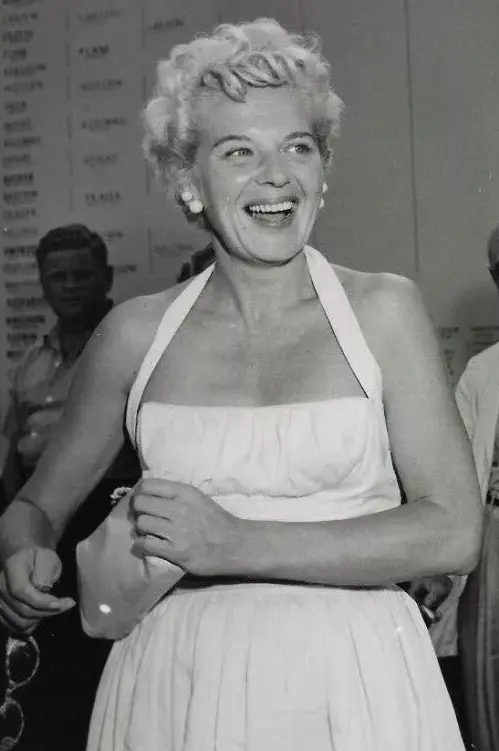
- Bobo Rockefeller in 1954
- Born: Jievutė Paulekiūtė; September 16, 1916; Noblestown, Pennsylvania, U.S.
- Died: May 19, 2008 (aged 91); Little Rock, Arkansas, U.S.
- Education: Northwestern University
- Spouses: Richard Sears (m. 1941, divorced) Winthrop Rockefeller (m. 1948; div. 1954)
- Partner: Charles W. Mapes (1962)
- Children: Winthrop Paul Rockefeller

Barbara "Bobo" Sears Rockefeller (née Jievutė Paulekiūtė; September 6, 1916 – May 19, 2008), also known professionally as Eva Paul, was an American actress. She was married to Winthrop Rockefeller of the Rockefeller family from 1948 to 1954. They were the parents of Winthrop Paul Rockefeller.

== Early life and career ==
Rockefeller was born on 6 September 1916 as Jievute Paulekiute (Lithuanian: Jievutė Paulekiūtė) in Noblestown, Pennsylvania to Julius Paulekas, a coal miner, and Jieva (née Ivanavicius), both destitute Lithuanian immigrants. Her parents divorced shortly after her birth.

After the divorce, Rockefeller moved with her mother and sister to Chicago. It was there, while attending grammar school, that she began going by Eva. In high school, she shortened her surname to Paul. At the age of 17, Rockefeller was crowned Miss Lithuania in a contest held by the Lithuanian Daily News. Her mother and stepfather moved the family to Indiana not long afterwards.

Rockefeller graduated from high school in 1935 and attended Northwestern University for a year and a half before dropping out to become a model.

She also held the position of third secretary at the U.S. embassy in Paris. She was also featured on Time's cover.

== Personal life ==
Rockefeller married the wealthy Richard Sears Jr. in 1941. They divorced seven years later.

She married Winthrop Rockefeller on February 14, 1948 in a small, private ceremony attended by fewer than 10 people, including best man Laurance Rockefeller and Bobo’s sister, Isabel Paul, as the maid of honor. She and Rockefeller split in a highly publicized divorce in 1954, reporting they had already been separated for four years. Following what newspapers described as a "fierce legal battle", she won custody of her son and a $5.5 million settlement. She later had a brief engagement to hotelier Charles W. Mapes in 1962. Her son, Winthrop Paul Rockefeller, a former lieutenant governor of Arkansas, died in 2006.

She died on May 19, 2008, in Little Rock, Arkansas.

== Filmography ==
- Tobacco Road (1941)
- That Night with You (1945)
- Bad Men of the Border (1945)
- Code of the Lawless (1945)
- The Road to Total War (1983)
- Goodbye War (1983)
- The Relationship (1988)
