= Winthrop Rockefeller =

Governor of Arkansas from 1967 to 1971

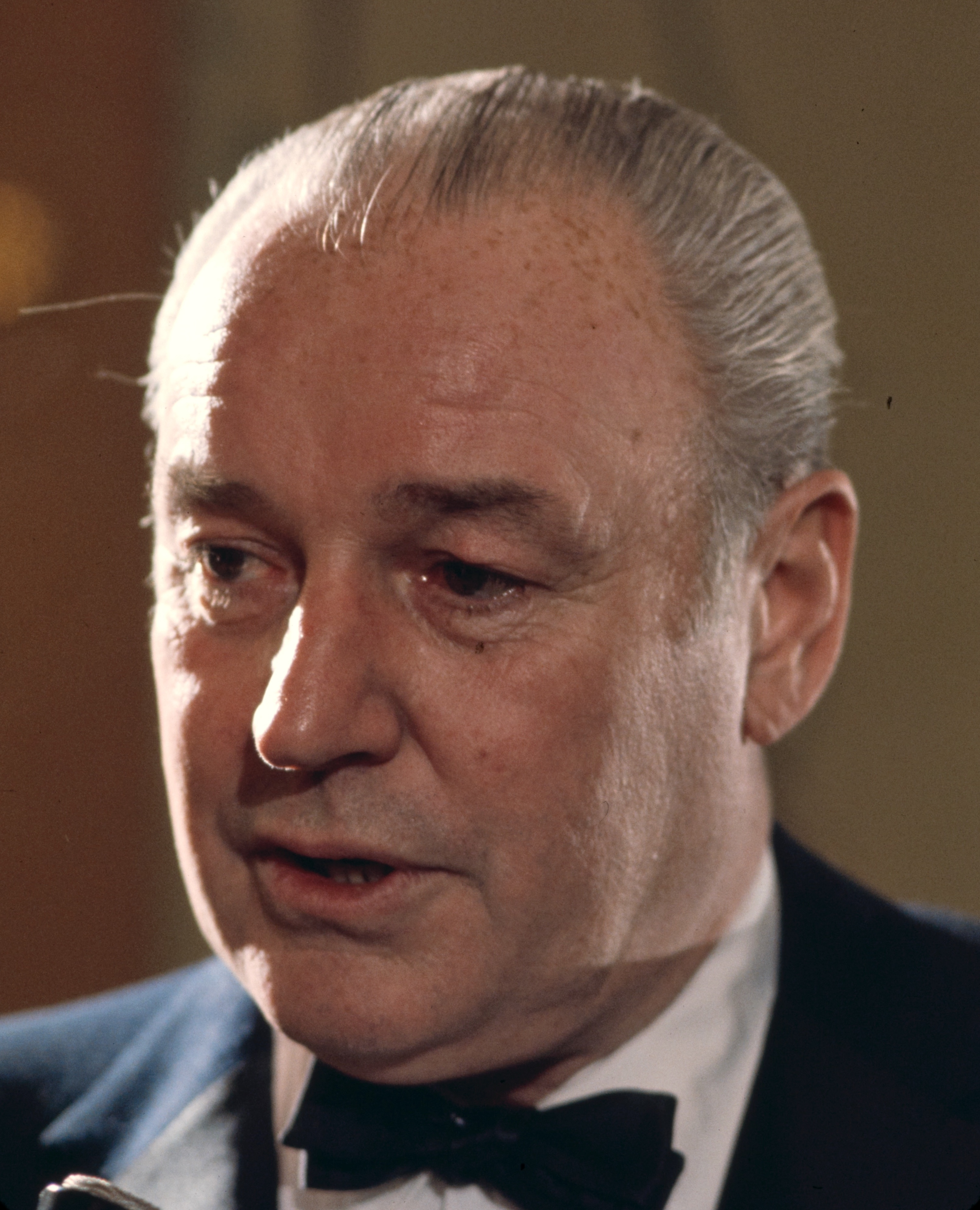
- Portrait by Bernard Gotfryd, 1967

37th Governor of Arkansas
- In office January 10, 1967 – January 12, 1971
- Lieutenant: Maurice Britt
- Preceded by: Orval Faubus
- Succeeded by: Dale Bumpers

Personal details
- Born: May 1, 1912 New York City, New York, U.S.
- Died: February 22, 1973 (aged 60) Palm Springs, California, U.S.
- Resting place: Winrock Farms; Morrilton, Arkansas, U.S.
- Party: Republican
- Spouses: Jievute "Bobo" Paulekiute (m. 1948; div. 1954) Jeannette Edris (m. 1956; div. 1971)
- Children: Winthrop Paul Rockefeller
- Parent(s): John Davison Rockefeller Jr. Abigail Greene Aldrich
- Relatives: See Rockefeller family
- Education: Yale University
- Profession: Politician, businessman

Military service
- Allegiance: United States
- Branch/service: United States Army
- Years of service: 1941–1945
- Rank: Lieutenant Colonel
- Unit: 77th Infantry Division
- Battles/wars: World War II
- Awards: Purple Heart; Bronze Star Medal

Winthrop Rockefeller (May 1, 1912 – February 22, 1973) was an American politician and philanthropist. Rockefeller was the fourth son and fifth child of American financier John D. Rockefeller Jr. and Abby Aldrich Rockefeller. He was one of the grandchildren of Standard Oil co-founder John D. Rockefeller. As an entrepreneur in Arkansas, he financed many local projects, including a number of new medical clinics in poorer areas, before being elected state governor in 1966, as the first Republican governor of Arkansas since the Reconstruction era. Despite accusations of lacking insight into the concerns of low-income voters, Rockefeller was re-elected in 1968, and went on to complete the integration of Arkansas schools.

In 1968, he was the favorite son of the Arkansas delegation to the 1968 Republican National Convention. It was widely expected that the Arkansas delegates would switch to his brother, New York governor Nelson Rockefeller, on a second ballot. However, Richard Nixon secured the nomination on the first ballot, and the Arkansas delegates switched to Nixon instead.

== Early life ==
Winthrop Rockefeller was born in New York, to philanthropists John Davison Rockefeller Jr. and socialite, Abigail Greene "Abby" Aldrich. He is one of the grandsons of Standard Oil co-founder John D. Rockefeller. He had one elder sister named Abby, three elder brothers John III, Nelson, and Laurance, and a younger brother named David. Nelson served as Governor of New York and Vice President of the United States under Gerald Ford.

Winthrop attended Yale University (1931–1934) before resigning to go work in the oil industry. Prior to attending Yale, he graduated from the Loomis Chaffee School in Windsor, Connecticut.

On January 22, 1941, he enlisted as a private in the Army, while the United States was still neutral during World War II. He was initially assigned to the 26th Regiment of the 1st Infantry Division. He was later assigned to the 77th Infantry Division. He eventually rose to the rank of lieutenant colonel. With the 77th Division he served in the invasions of Guam and Leyte in the Philippines. He earned a Bronze Star with Oak Leaf Clusters and a Purple Heart for his actions aboard the troopship USS Henrico, after a kamikaze attack during the invasion of Okinawa. His image appears in the Infantry Officer Hall of Fame at Fort Benning, Georgia.

== Early political career ==
=== First campaigns ===
Rockefeller resigned his position with the Arkansas Industrial Development Commission and conducted his first campaign for governor in 1964 against Orval Faubus. His campaign was ultimately unsuccessful, but Rockefeller energized and reformed the tiny Republican Party of Arkansas to set the stage for the future. In 1964, Osro Cobb, a Republican former state chairman who had also served as United States Attorney for the Eastern District of Arkansas, refused to endorse Rockefeller but openly endorsed Faubus, who subsequently gave Cobb a temporary appointment to the Arkansas Supreme Court.

In his memoirs, Cobb recalls that Rockefeller

had used ruthless tactics to convert the fine Republican state organization into a one-man Rockefeller machine, loyal not to party but to Rockefeller personally. In rapid succession, Mr. Rockefeller captiously took over most of the functions of the state chairman and in a matter of months succeeded in taking over and exercising absolute right of dictation as to each and every important party function at the state level. Such one-man dictatorship is clearly the deadly enemy of any semblance of two-party government. ... Faithful Republican leaders who have worked tirelessly over the years have been pushed aside or replaced. ... A stranger passing through Arkansas at this time and seeing Mr. Rockefeller's advertising on billboards would not know whether Mr. Rockefeller belonged to any political party. Certainly the fact that he is the Republican nominee has not been included. The evidence simply is unanswerable that Mr. Rockefeller is working for his own personal interest to the exclusion of all other considerations, which leaves the Republican Party in Arkansas hanging precariously at the whims of one individual ... .

== 1966 Arkansas gubernatorial election ==
When Rockefeller made his second run in the 1966 election, only 11 percent of Arkansans considered themselves Republicans. But Arkansans had tired of Faubus after six terms as governor and as head of the Democratic "machine". Democrats themselves seemed to be more interested in the reforms that Rockefeller offered in his campaign than "winning another one for the party". An odd coalition of Republicans and Democratic reform voters catapulted Rockefeller into the governor's office, as he defeated a segregationist Democratic former Justice of the Arkansas Supreme Court, James D. Johnson of Conway in Faulkner County, who preferred the appellation "Justice Jim".

Former state Republican chairman Osro Cobb reversed himself in 1966 and endorsed Rockefeller. He explains:

Arkansas Republicans were eager to work with Winthrop Rockefeller on another race for governor if he could be led to run as a true Republican to help build the party in the state. I liked him personally. He showed me many courtesies, and I still thought [despite feelings in 1964] that he would make a good governor and could be elected on the Republican ticket. ... He had learned a lesson. And he won his next two races for governor. ... His service contributed greatly to the enormous benefits of two-party government in Arkansas.

At the time Winthrop became governor, his brother Nelson Rockefeller had been the governor of New York since 1959, and remained so throughout Winthrop's four years in office. They are often erroneously cited as the first two brothers to be governors at the same time, but they were actually the third case; the previous instances were Levi and Enoch Lincoln from 1827 to 1829, and John and William Bigler from 1852 to 1855. More recently, George W. and Jeb Bush were both governors from 1999 to 2000.

At the 1968 Republican National Convention, Winthrop Rockefeller received backing from members of the Arkansas delegation as a "favorite son" presidential candidate. He received all of his state's 18 votes; his brother Nelson, then concluding a major presidential bid against Richard M. Nixon, received 277. This was the only time in the 20th century that the names of two brothers were placed into nomination at the same time.

== Governor of Arkansas 1967–1971 ==
=== Tenure ===
The Rockefeller administration enthusiastically embarked on a series of reforms but faced a hostile Democratic legislature. Rockefeller endured a number of personal attacks and a concerted whispering campaign regarding his personal life.

Scholars Diane Blair and Jay L. Barth continue: "As long as Rockefeller led the Arkansas Republicans, the party had a progressive, reformist cast, and those whom Rockefeller had brought into the party continued to dominate party offices and shape presidential preferences until 1980," when the nomination and election of Ronald Reagan of California as president and Frank D. White as governor moved power within the state GOP "sharply to the right." Ultimately the growth of the Republican Party was slower in Arkansas than in the other southern states in the post-segregation era. Blair and Barth attribute sluggish GOP development to "tradition, [which] is important to rural people. They are looking for ways to stay with the Democratic Party; they have to be run off."

According to his biographer, Cathy Kunzinger Urwin, Rockefeller's "good-government" reform proposals included: revision of the Arkansas State Constitution, governmental administrative reorganization, election law reform (a "little Hatch Act" to prohibit state employees from engaging in political activities on the job), teacher tenure, taxpayer-funded kindergarten under Amendment 53, adult and continuing education programs, rehabilitation and vocational training in the corrections system, and the recurring attempts at industrial recruitment. One of Rockefeller's most publicized "good-government" reforms was the ending of illegal gambling in the resort city of Hot Springs. He also made headway in streamlining state government and secured passage of a state minimum-wage law.

Urwin determined that Rockefeller's negatives created public perceptions of "his personal flaws, rather than his accomplishments or lack of them, as governor." Considered a weak administrator, he depended too heavily on staff, so improperly managed that the employees often failed to answer mail. He was habitually tardy to meetings. A special legislative session in May 1968 was particularly disastrous. An Oliver Quayle poll in 1968 declared that Rockefeller seemed "strange, alien, and foreign" to many voters. The poll maintained that many thought Rockefeller sought too much power, that he drank too much, and that he spent too little time in his office. A majority said that the wealthy Rockefeller, despite his interest in "good government," could not understand the problems of common people on restricted incomes or those in the middle class with limited investment opportunities.

Rockefeller had a particular interest in the reform of the Arkansas prison system. Soon after his election he had received a shocking report from the Arkansas State Police on the brutal conditions within the prison system. He decried the "lack of righteous indignation" about the situation and created a new Department of Corrections. He appointed a new warden, academic Tom Murton, the first professional penologist that the state had ever retained in that capacity. However, he fired Murton less than a year later, when Murton's aggressive attempts to expose decades of corruption in the system subjected Arkansas to nationwide contempt.

Rockefeller also focused on the state's lackluster educational system and proposed funding increases for new buildings and teacher salaries when the legislature allowed.

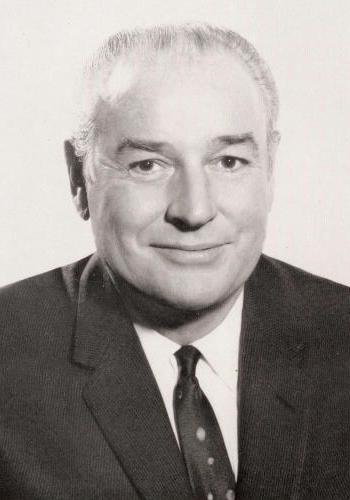
Rockefeller in 1969

Much of Rockefeller's second term was spent in conflict with the opposition legislature. In 1969, he told the lawmakers that his reelection the previous November had meant that a slim majority of voters had approved of tax increases. He proposed to spend half of the new revenues sought on education, 12 percent on health and welfare, 10 percent on local government, and the remainder on state employee salaries and streamlined services. "There are no frills in what I am proposing ... . no luxuries ... . no monuments to me as an individual ... . I implore every member of the General Assembly as I have myself: Listen to the voice of the people ... . not to the selfish interests."

Ernest Dumas, then with the since defunct Arkansas Gazette in Little Rock noted that the Rockefeller revenue package was essentially dead-on-arrival in both houses of the legislature though parts of the program were enacted piecemeal in the subsequent administration of the Democrat Dale Bumpers. Dumas describes Rockefeller as the "most liberal governor in Arkansas history" in light of his attempts to increase taxes to augment the size and scope of state government as well as steadfast support for civil rights and opposition to capital punishment.

During this term Rockefeller quietly and successfully completed the integration of Arkansas schools that had been such a political bombshell only a few years before. He established the Council on Human Relations despite opposition from the legislature. Draft boards in the state boasted the highest level of racial integration of any U.S. state by the time that Rockefeller left office. He was also the only governor from a Southern state to hold a public memorial for Martin Luther King Jr.

In 1970, the Arkansas GOP under Rockefeller hired its first paid executive director, Neal Sox Johnson of Nashville in Howard County. Johnson left the position in 1973 to take a high position with the former Farmers Home Administration in Washington, D.C., and was replaced by Ken Coon, who carried the party's gubernatorial banner in 1974 against David Pryor.

=== 1970 gubernatorial election ===
In the 1970 campaign, Rockefeller expected to face Orval Faubus, who led the old-guard Democrats, but the previously unknown Dale Bumpers of Charleston in Franklin County rose to the top of the Democratic heap by promising reforms. Bumpers' charisma and "fresh face" were too much for an incumbent Republican to overcome. Rockefeller lost his third-term bid, but he had inadvertently propelled the Democrats to reform their own party.

With the 1970 elections, the Republicans were reduced to a single member of each legislative chamber, Preston Bynum of Siloam Springs in the House and Jim Caldwell in the Senate. Danny Patrick, elected with Rockefeller in 1966 and 1968, went down to defeat in Madison and Carroll counties at the hands of Stephen A. Smith, who at twenty-one became Arkansas' youngest-ever state legislator, a designation that Patrick himself had taken only four years earlier. Smith later became a top aide to Bill Clinton in his first term as Governor.

As a dramatic last act, Governor Rockefeller, a longtime death penalty opponent, commuted the sentences of every prisoner on Arkansas's death row and urged the governors of other states to do likewise. Thirty-three years later, in January 2003, Illinois' lame duck governor, George Ryan, would do the same, granting blanket commutations to the 167 inmates then sentenced to death in the state.

== Personal life ==
An article in Texas Monthly alleges Candace Johnson née Weatherby, later to become the well-known Houston socialite Candy Mossler, was involved with Winthrop Rockefeller during his military service in the South.

On February 14, 1948, Winthrop married actress Jievute "Bobo" Paulekiute (September 6, 1916 – May 19, 2008). She was previously married to Boston Brahmin socialite John Sears Jr. The wedding took place in Florida, and at the reception, a choir sang Negro spirituals. On September 17, 1948, she gave birth to their son, Winthrop Paul "Win" Rockefeller. The couple separated in 1950 and divorced in 1954. Bobo got custody of Win.

Winthrop was given the Marcel Breuer House at Pocantico after that house was relocated to his family's estate, Kykuit, in 1950. However, he did not spend much time at Kykuit in adulthood.

On June 11, 1956, Rockefeller wed the Seattle-born socialite Jeanette Edris (1918–1997). She had two children, Bruce and Anne Bartley, from a previous marriage. Winthrop and Jeanette had no children together and divorced shortly after he left the governorship in 1971. As the state's First Lady, Jeanette Rockefeller took a special interest in mental health issues.

In September 1972, Rockefeller was diagnosed with inoperable pancreatic cancer and endured a devastating round of chemotherapy. When he returned to Arkansas the populace was shocked at his gaunt and haggard appearance. Winthrop Rockefeller died February 22, 1973, in Palm Springs, California, at the age of sixty. His body was cremated, and his ashes were interred at Winrock Farms in Morrilton, Arkansas.

== Legacy ==
The legacy of Winthrop Rockefeller lives on in the form of numerous charities, scholarships, and the activities of the Winthrop Rockefeller Foundation and the Winthrop Rockefeller Charitable Trust, including Winrock International, an international nonprofit organization based in Little Rock, Arkansas whose mission is to empower disadvantaged people, increase economic opportunity, and sustain natural resources. The Winthrop Rockefeller Foundation provides funding for projects across Arkansas to encourage economic development, education, and racial and social justice. In 1964, he founded Museum of Automobiles on Petit Jean Mountain, which after his death in 1973 was given to the Arkansas State Parks system; a non-profit organization was formed to run the museum; in March 2007, the Charitable Trust pledged $100,000 for its ongoing operations if the museum raised an equal amount by the end of that year.

Founded in 2005, the Winthrop Rockefeller Institute (commonly called the Institute) is a nonprofit organization on Petit Jean Mountain that seeks to continue Gov. Winthrop Rockefeller’s collaborative approach to creating transformational change and a 509(a)(3) supporting organization of the University of Arkansas System. The Winthrop Rockefeller Charitable Trust gifted the Institute a $100 million endowment in 2018, which is held by the University of Arkansas Foundation.

Rockefeller's political legacy lives on in both the Republican and Democratic parties of Arkansas, both of which were forced to reform as a result of his presence on the state scene.

Rockefeller was the subject of the December 2, 1966, cover of Time magazine.

Winthrop Rockefeller's son and only child, Win, served as Arkansas lieutenant governor, having won a special election in 1996 to succeed Mike Huckabee. Winthrop Paul Rockefeller then won two full four-year terms in 1998 and 2002. Like his father, Win Paul Rockefeller's political career was cut short by a devastating cancer.

The Winrock Shopping Center in Albuquerque, New Mexico, is named for Rockefeller. He developed the center in a relationship with the University of New Mexico.

During his tenure as chairman of Colonial Williamsburg, Winthrop was a frequent visitor at the foundation's Carter's Grove Plantation eight miles away in James City County, Virginia. He is credited with helping develop a plan with Gussie Busch in the early 1970s to turn a portion of the large tract of undeveloped land between the two points into the massive Anheuser-Busch (AB) investment there, which included building a large brewery, the Busch Gardens Williamsburg theme park, the Kingsmill planned resort community, and McLaws Circle, an office park. AB and related entities from that development plan now are the source of the area's largest employment base, surpassing both Colonial Williamsburg and the local military bases.

== Electoral history ==
1964 General Election for Governor Orval Faubus (D) (inc.) 57% Winthrop Rockefeller (R) 43%

1966 Republican Primary for Governor Winthrop Rockefeller 98% Gus McMillan 2%

1966 General Election for Governor Winthrop Rockefeller (R) 54% James D. "Justice Jim" Johnson (D) 46%

1968 Republican Primary for Governor Winthrop Rockefeller (inc.) 95% Sidney K. Roberts 5%

1968 General Election for Governor Winthrop Rockefeller (R) (inc.) 52% Marion Crank (D) 48%

1970 Republican Primary for Governor Winthrop Rockefeller (inc.) 95% James K. "Uncle Mac" MacKrell 2% R.J. Hampton 2% Lester Gibbs 1%

1970 General Election for Governor Dale Bumpers (D) 62% Winthrop Rockefeller (R) (inc.) 32% Walter L. Carruth (AIP) 6%

== See also ==
- List of governors of Arkansas
- Rockefeller family
- Arkansas Prison scandal
- Winthrop Paul Rockefeller

== Notes ==
Political offices
Preceded by Orval Faubus	Governor of Arkansas; January 10, 1967 – January 12, 1971	Succeeded by Dale L. Bumpers
Party political offices
Preceded by Willis Ricketts	Republican nominee for Governor of Arkansas; 1964, 1966, 1968, 1970	Succeeded by Len E. Blaylock
Preceded by Wallace Townsend	Republican National Committeeman from Arkansas; 1961–1973	Succeeded by Odell Pollard
