= 1964 Arkansas gubernatorial election =

- November 3, 1964
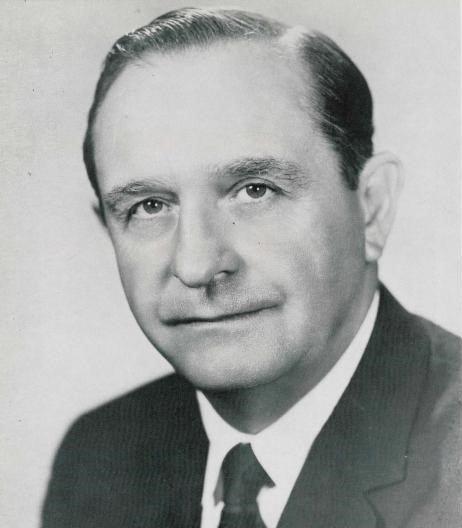

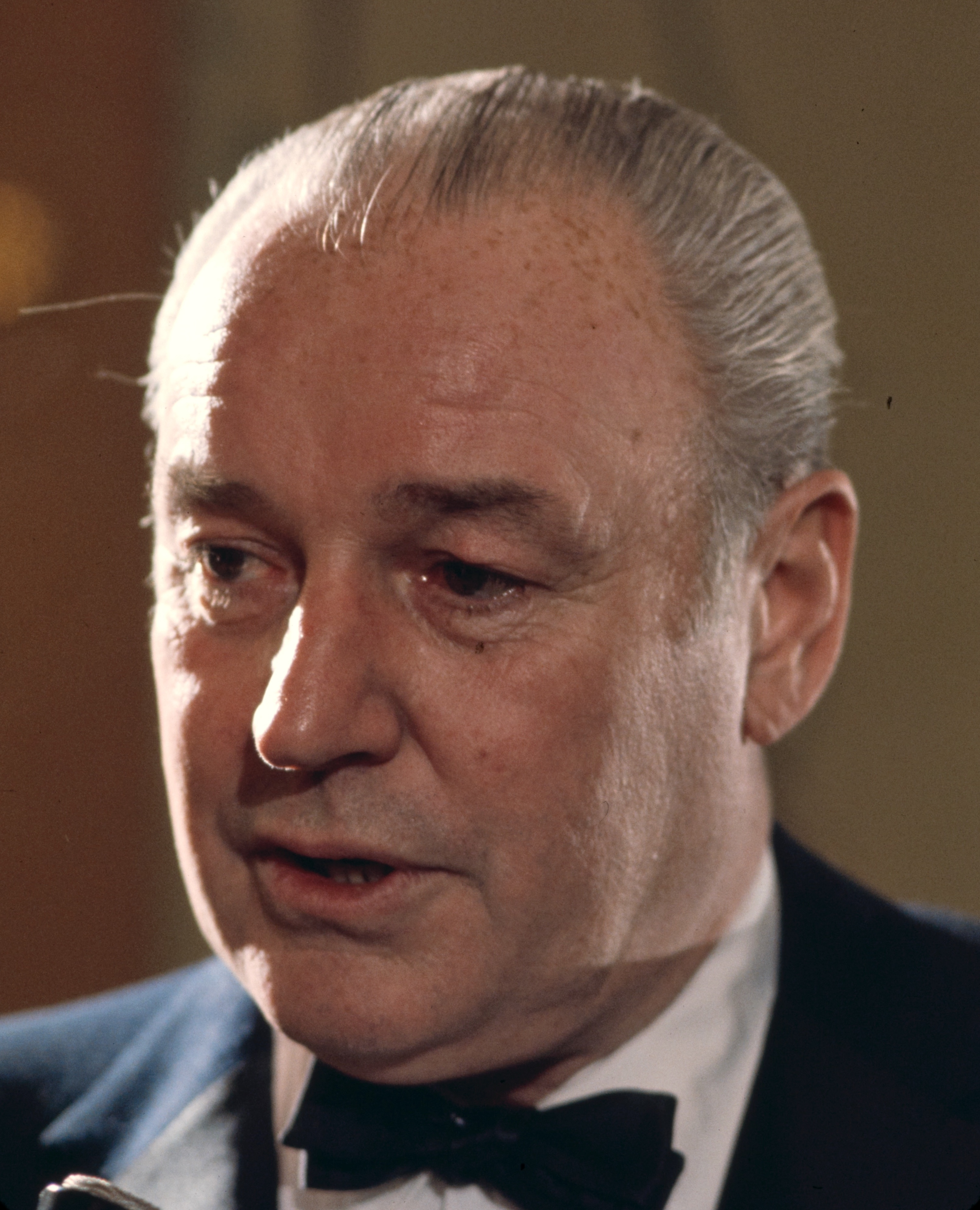
Nominee	Orval Faubus	Winthrop Rockefeller
Party	Democratic	Republican
Popular vote	337,489	254,561
Percentage	57.00%	42.99%
- County results Faubus: 50–60% 60–70% 70–80% Rockefeller: 50–60% 60–70%
Governor before election
Orval Faubus
Democratic
Elected Governor
Orval Faubus
Democratic

The 1964 Arkansas gubernatorial election was held on November 3, 1964.

Incumbent Democratic Governor Orval Faubus won election to a sixth term, defeating Republican nominee Winthrop Rockefeller with 57.00% of the vote.

== Primary elections ==
Primary elections were held on July 28, 1964.

=== Democratic primary ===
==== Candidates ====
- Ervin Odell Dorsey
- Orval Faubus, incumbent Governor
- Joe Hubbard
- R. D. Burrow, hardware store owner

==== Results ====
Democratic primary results
Party	Candidate	Votes	%
Democratic	Orval Faubus (incumbent)	239.890	65.72
Democratic	Ervin Odell Dorsey	69,638	19.08
Democratic	Joe Hubbard	39,199	10.74
Democratic	R. D. Burrow	16,310	4.47
Total votes		365,037	100.00

=== Republican primary ===
==== Candidates ====
- Winthrop Rockefeller, businessman

==== Results ====
Republican primary results
Party	Candidate	Votes	%
Republican	Winthrop Rockefeller		unopposed

== General election ==
=== Candidates ===
- Orval Faubus, Democratic
- Winthrop Rockefeller, Republican
- Kenneth Hurst, Write-in, Service Station operator

=== Results ===
1964 Arkansas gubernatorial election
Party	Candidate	Votes	%	±%
Democratic	Orval Faubus (incumbent)	337,489	57.00%	−16.27%
Republican	Winthrop Rockefeller	254,561	42.99%	+16.26%
Write-in	Kenneth Hurst	63	0.01%	
Majority		82,928	14.01%	
Turnout		592,113	100.00%	
Democratic hold		Swing		

=== Results by county ===
County	Orval Faubus Democratic		Winthrop Rockefeller Republican		Kenneth Hurst Write-in		Margin		Total votes cast
County	#	%	#	%	#	%	#	%	Total votes cast
Benton	5,747	44.77%	7,090	55.23%	0	0.00%	-1,343	-10.54%	12,837
Crawford	4,409	59.66%	2,981	40.34%	0	0.0%	1,472	19.32%	7,490
Franklin	3,202	64.58%	1,756	35.42%	0	0.00%	1,446	29.16%	4,958
Johnson	3,109	62.44%	1,870	37.56%	0	0.00%	1,339	24.88%	4,979
Logan	3,404	56.64%	2,606	43.36%	0	0.00%	798	13.28%	6,010
Madison	3,155	63.67%	1,800	36.33%	0	0.00%	1,355	27.34%	4,955
Newton	1,555	51.97%	1,437	48.03%	0	0.00%	118	3.94%	2,992
Scott	1,689	54.61%	1,404	45.39%	0	0.00%	285	9.22%	3,093
Sebastian	11,644	48.03%	12,599	51.97%	0	0.00%	-955	-3.94%	24,243
Washington	8,741	44.27%	11,002	55.73%	0	0.00%	-2,261	-11.46%	19,743
Totals	337,489	57.00%	254,561	42.99%	63	0.01%	82,928	14.01%	592,113

== Bibliography ==
- Gubernatorial Elections, 1787-1997. Washington, D.C.: Congressional Quarterly Inc. 1998. ISBN 1-56802-396-0.
- Scammon, Richard M., ed. (1966). America Votes 6: a handbook of contemporary American election statistics, 1964. Washington, D.C.: Governmental Affairs Institute.
