= South Fayette Township, Pennsylvania =

Township in Pennsylvania, US

Coordinates: 40°20′53″N 80°08′41″W

South Fayette Township, Allegheny County, Pennsylvania
- Township
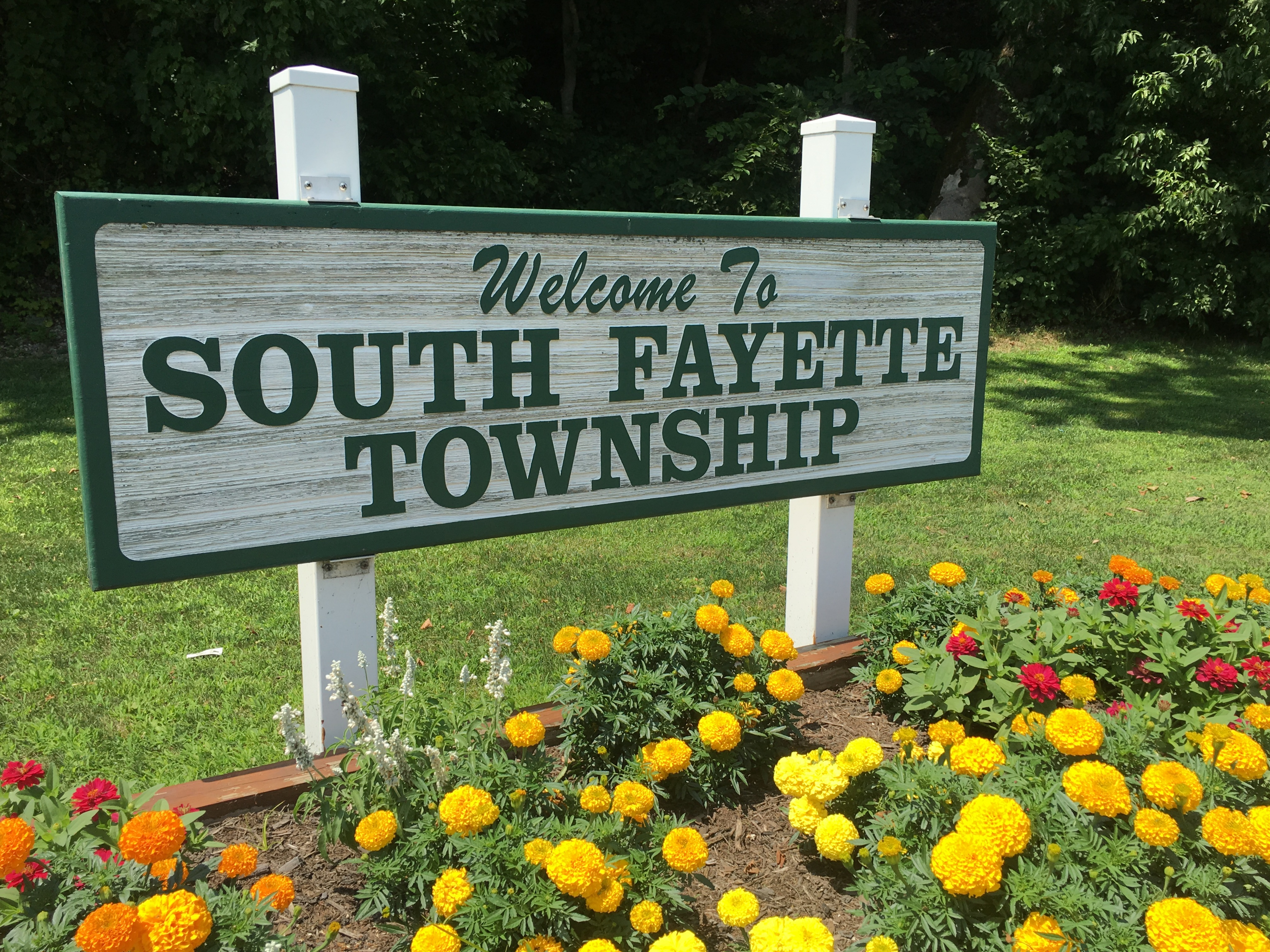
- South Fayette Township Welcome Sign
- Etymology: Named for Gilbert du Motier, Marquis de Lafayette
- Motto: A Community Growing Together
- Location in Allegheny County and state of Pennsylvania
- Country: United States
- State: Pennsylvania
- County: Allegheny
- Established: 1842

Government
  - Type: First-Class Township Government (Board of Commissioners/Township Manager)

Area
  - Total: 20.39 sq mi (52.80 km^{2})
  - Land: 20.38 sq mi (52.79 km^{2})
  - Water: 0.0039 sq mi (0.01 km^{2})

Population (2020)
  - Total: 18,358 ▲
  - Estimate (2025): 18,648
  - Density: 764.2/sq mi (295.06/km^{2})
- Time zone: UTC-5 (Eastern (EST))
  - Summer (DST): UTC-4 (EDT)
- ZIP code: 15017, 15031, 15057, 15064, 15071, 15082, 15142, 15321
- Area codes: 412, 724
- FIPS code: 42-003-72160

South Fayette Township is a township in Allegheny County, Pennsylvania, United States. The population was 18,358 at the 2020 census.

== History ==
Throughout its early history, South Fayette Township was the site of numerous conflicts between the earlier Native American residents and arriving settlers, particularly in the northern areas of the township. There are several historical relics found in South Fayette, such as Native American stone instruments and graves.

The earliest known settler was a man of English descent with the surname Miller; he came to the area sometime around 1768. He settled at the mouth of a stream that would be named Millers Run. Before later emigrating to Kentucky, Miller sold an expansive tract of land to a land speculator named Campbell for a pair of shoes. The first permanent settler was Christian Lesnett, a German immigrant who came from Baltimore, Maryland, in 1770.

In 1790, Capt. Samuel Morgan built a gristmill, later purchased by Moses Coulter, whose son converted it into a steam mill. He added a sawmill and later changed it to a steel mill. Coal and oil were discovered in the township between 1860 and 1910, and mining became a big industry.

The area that today is known as South Fayette Township originally was claimed by both Pennsylvania and Virginia. In 1788, the area became part of Moon Township, one of the seven townships in Allegheny County, Pennsylvania. Two years later, Fayette Township was carved out of Moon Township. The areas that today are known as South Fayette Township and North Fayette Township comprised Fayette Township, named in honor of General Lafayette. In 1842, Fayette Township was split into North Fayette and South Fayette townships. South Fayette was officially established March 16, 1842, and celebrated its 175th anniversary in 2017. Following the creation of Collier Township in 1875, South Fayette Township's territorial limits as they stand today are formed by the Washington County line, Robinson Run, Coal Run and Chartiers Creek.

Today, South Fayette Township is a fast-growing community benefiting from its proximity to Downtown Pittsburgh, Southpointe, Pittsburgh International Airport, the Robinson Township commercial district, the South Fayette interchange of Interstate 79, the future Southern Beltway toll highway, public parks, a variety of businesses and a highly ranked school district. In 2013, South Fayette was nominated as the best Pittsburgh suburb in which to raise a family in a regional survey.

The Historical Society of South Fayette Township works to preserve the community's history.

== Geography ==
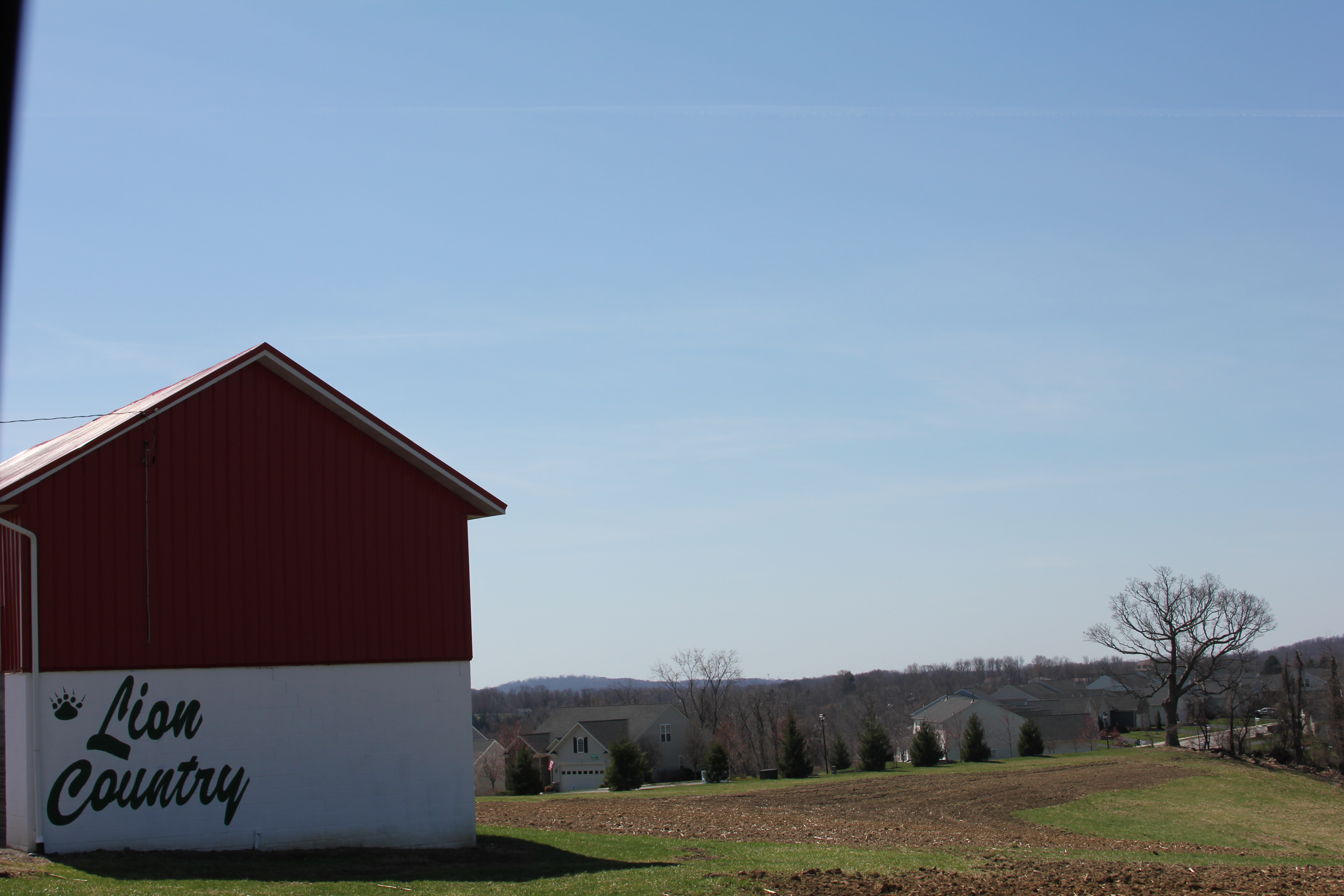

According to the United States Census Bureau, the township has a total area of 20.4 square miles (53 km^{2}), of which 20.95 square miles (54.3 km^{2}) is land and 0.05% is water. The topography is mostly wooded with small hills and floodplains on four streams. It is located 14 miles (23 km) southwest of Pittsburgh.

=== Neighboring communities ===
South Fayette Township has seven borders, including the borough of Bridgeville and Upper St. Clair Township to the east, Cecil Township (Washington County) to the south and west, North Fayette Township and the boroughs of McDonald and Oakdale to the northwest, and Collier Township to the northeast.

=== Commercial districts ===
Most of South Fayette's commercial business is concentrated along Washington Pike, a state-owned road. A commercial development of about 1,000,000 square feet (93,000 m^{2}) is under way called Newbury Market. Plans include a Topgolf entertainment center, restaurants, office buildings and other business. The Gateway Shops has opened at the Newbury entrance.

The Original Farmers Market, Pittsburgh's oldest farmers market is located on Route 50 in South Fayette Township and is open from May to November.

The Route 22 to I-79 span of the Southern Beltway is currently under construction. The new span of the turnpike will run through the southwestern part of the township, providing direct access to Pittsburgh International Airport. It is expected that the construction of this new span will spur residential and commercial development along its path.

=== Communities within South Fayette ===
Newer neighborhoods within South Fayette include Sterling Ridge, The Berkshires, Newbury, Forest Ridge, Hunting Ridge, Hickory Heights, Pinnacle Point, Springhouse, Willowbrook, and Estates of Lion Ridge. Historic neighborhoods include Morgan, Morgan Hill, Cuddy, National Hill, Treveskyn, Boyce, Sturgeon, Gladden, and Noblestown, among others.

== Demographics ==
Historical population
Census	Pop.	Note	%±
1930	9,147		—
1940	9,780		6.9%
1950	9,979		2.0%
1960	10,728		7.5%
1970	9,369		−12.7%
1980	9,707		3.6%
1990	10,329		6.4%
2000	12,271		18.8%
2010	14,416		17.5%
2020	18,349		27.3%
2024 (est.)	18,586		1.3%

=== 2000 census ===
As of the 2000 census, there were 12,271 people, 4,704 households, and 3,085 families residing in the township. The population density was 603.2 inhabitants per square mile (232.9/km^{2}). There were 4,924 housing units at an average density of 242.1 per square mile (93.5/km^{2}). The racial makeup of the township was 93.93% White, 3.50% African American, 0.02% Native American, 1.59% Asian, 0.05% Pacific Islander, 0.30% from other races, and 0.62% from two or more races. Hispanic or Latino of any race were 0.72% of the population.

There were 4,704 households, out of which 30.9% had children under the age of 18 living with them, 55.6% were married couples living together, 7.4% had a female householder with no husband present, and 34.4% were non-families. 29.7% of all households were made up of individuals, and 10.7% had someone living alone who was 65 years of age or older. The average household size was 2.39 and the average family size was 3.01.

In the township the population was spread out, with 22.1% under the age of 18, 5.4% from 18 to 24, 33.4% from 25 to 44, 23.1% from 45 to 64, and 16.0% who were 65 years of age or older. The median age was 39 years. For every 100 females, there were 90.3 males. For every 100 females age 18 and over, there were 87.3 males.

The median income for a household in the township was $53,739, and the median income for a family was $65,473. Males had a median income of $48,750 versus $33,534 for females. The per capita income for the township was $26,082. About 2.9% of families and 4.2% of the population were below the poverty line, including 6.1% of those under age 18 and 4.0% of those age 65 or over.

=== 2020 census ===
As of the 2020 census, there were 18,394 people residing in the township. The population density was 904.3 inhabitants per square mile (349.2/km^{2}). The racial makeup of the township was 78.5% White, 3.0% African American, 0.0% Native American, 11.3% Asian, 0.0% Pacific Islander,and 5.7% from two or more races. Hispanic or Latino of any race were 3.2% of the population.

In the township the population was spread out, with 5.7% under the age of 5, 25.9% under the age of 18, and 17.1% who were 65 years of age or older.

== Government and politics ==
Presidential election results
Year	Republican	Democratic	Third parties
2020	51% 5,120	47% 4,769	1% 104
2016	54% 4,327	45% 3,603	1% 52
2012	57% 4,132	43% 3,107	0% 56

The Township of South Fayette operates under the powers of the First Class Township Code. The township is governed by a five-member elected Board of Commissioners, who serve four-year terms.

The residents of the township are served by Pennsylvania's 18th congressional district.

South Fayette Township publishes a free quarterly magazine, South Fayette Connect, for its citizens.

== Education ==
The South Fayette Township School District provides public educational services. The school district shares its borders with the township. The school district has an elementary school for grades K–2, an intermediate school for grades 3–5, a middle school for grades 6–8 and a high school for grades 9–12. The school district's mascot is a lion, and the school's teams are called lions.

The South Fayette Foundation for Excellence is a non-profit community organization that raises funds to support the academic, athletic and arts programs within the school district to supplement the school budget allocated for such purposes.

== Taxes ==
The current municipal/township property tax rate is 4.73 mills. The earned income tax rate is 1%. The school district tax rate (2017-2018) rate is 26.7 mills.

== Recreation ==
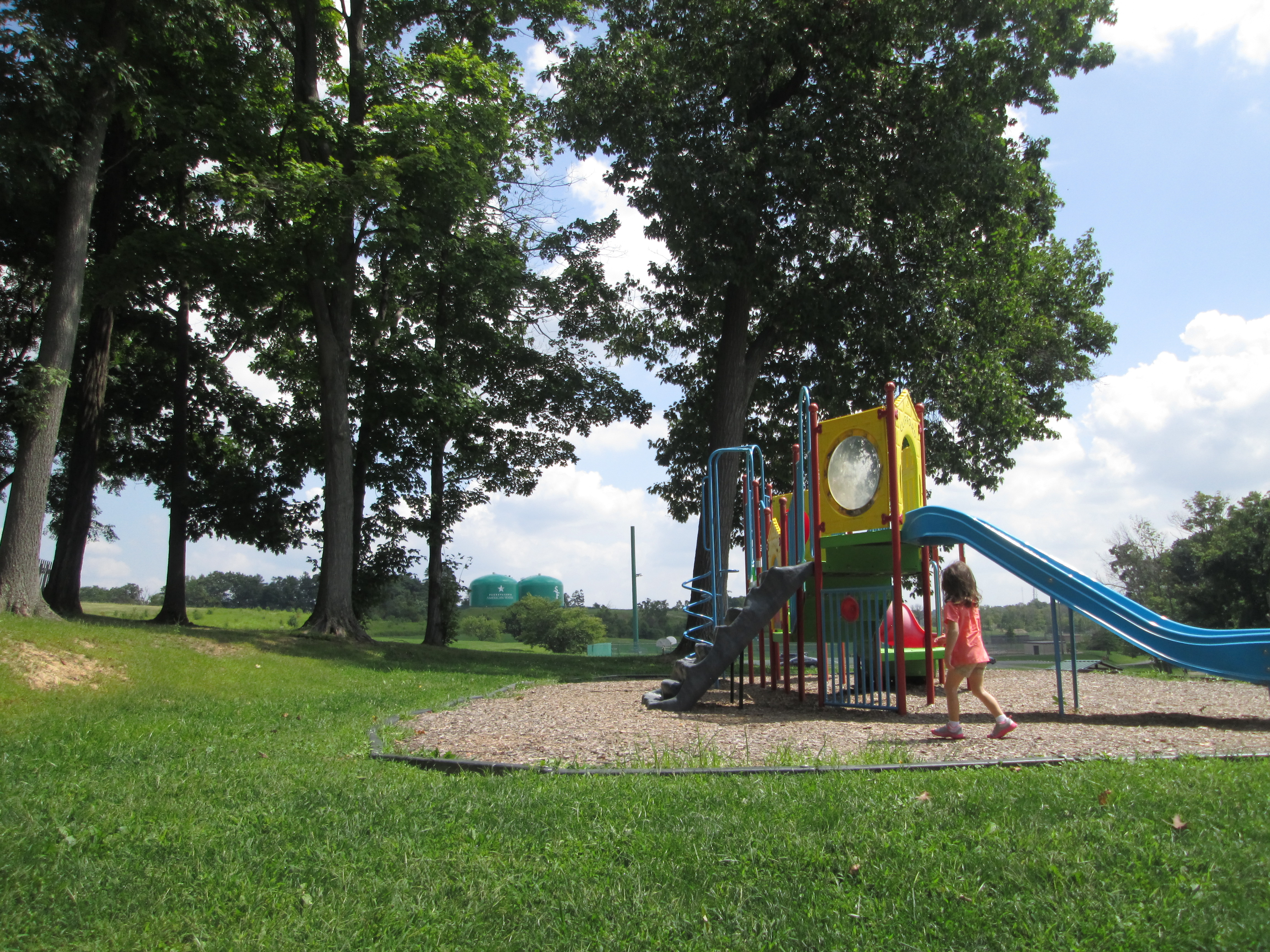
Fairview Park in South Fayette

South Fayette Township has a Department of Parks and Recreation which maintains municipal parks and organizes recreational events, including the largest annual event held each August, South Fayette Community Day. Township parks include Fairview Park, Morgan Park, Boys Home Park, Sturgeon Park, the Panhandle Trail and Preservation Park, which is under development. A portion of Fairview Park has been designated as an Off-Leash Dog Zone allowing dogs to run without leashes by annual permit only.

The South Fayette Township School District also makes available to residents and non-residents its Fitness and Aquatic Centers.

Community athletic associations, operating under the South Fayette Athletic Association, include:

- South Fayette Aqua Club
- South Fayette Baseball and Softball Association
- South Fayette Lady Lions Recreational Basketball
- South Fayette Men's Softball
- South Fayette Soccer Association
- South Fayette Township Youth Cheerleading Association
- South Fayette Township Youth Lacrosse Association
- South Fayette Youth Football Association

The Hickory Heights Golf Club provides an 18-hole golf course.

The South Fayette Township Library, in operation since January 10, 1994, is located in the township municipal building.

== Notable people ==
- Aldo Donelli, NFL player and member of the National Soccer Hall of Fame
- Jonathan Hayes, NFL player and coach
- Fred Mannering, Professor, Highly Cited Researcher, member of the U.S. National Academy of Engineering
- Jenna Morasca, winner of Survivor: The Amazon
- Ron Sams, NFL player
- Justin Watson, NFL player Super Bowl Champion (Chiefs)
- Stefen Wisniewski, NFL player and two-time Super Bowl Champion (Eagles, Chiefs)
