= Boyce, Pennsylvania =

Unincorporated community in Pennsylvania, US

- Unincorporated community
- Location within Pennsylvania
- Coordinates: 40°19′04″N 80°06′36″W
- Country: United States
- State: Pennsylvania
- County: Allegheny
- Township: Upper St. Clair, South Fayette
- Elevation: 879 ft (268 m)
- Time zone: UTC-5 (Eastern (EST))
  - Summer (DST): UTC-4 (EDT)
- Area code: 412
- GNIS feature ID: 1203133

Boyce is an unincorporated community in South Fayette and Upper St. Clair townships, Allegheny County, Pennsylvania, United States. Boyce is located along Chartiers Run, 10.5 miles (16.9 km) southwest of downtown Pittsburgh.
