= Sturgeon-Noblestown, Pennsylvania =

Sturgeon-Noblestown
- CDP
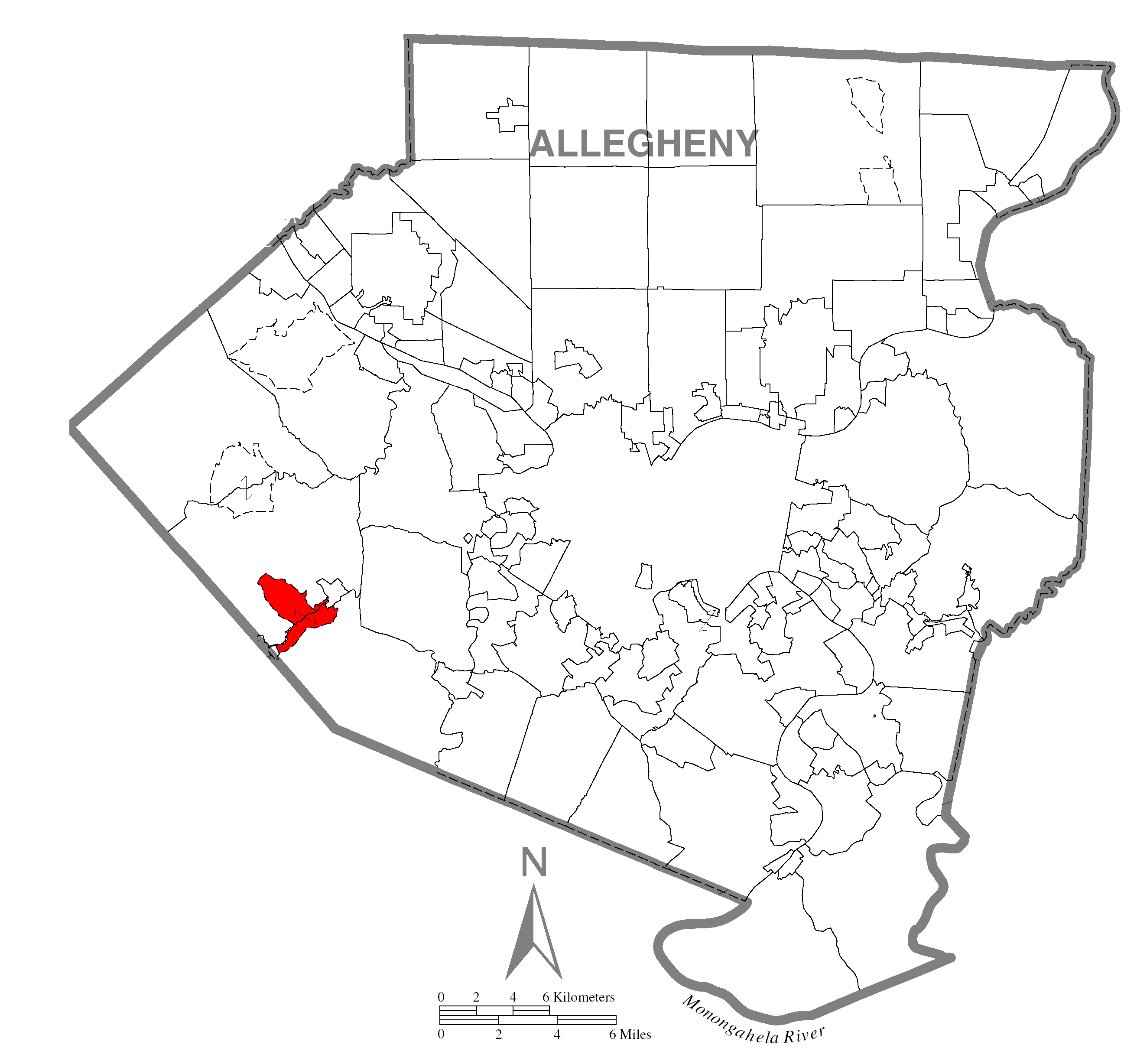
- Location within Allegheny county

- Location within the U.S. state of Pennsylvania Sturgeon-Noblestown (the United States)
- Coordinates: 40°23′2″N 80°12′33″W
- Country: United States
- State: Pennsylvania
- County: Allegheny

Area
  - Total: 2.9 sq mi (7.5 km^{2})
  - Land: 2.9 sq mi (7.5 km^{2})

Population (2000)
  - Total: 1,764
  - Density: 610/sq mi (230/km^{2})
- Time zone: UTC-5 (Eastern (EST))
  - Summer (DST): UTC-4 (EDT)

Sturgeon-Noblestown was a census-designated place (CDP) for the 2000 United States census in Allegheny County, Pennsylvania, United States. The population was 1,764 at that time. In the 2010 census the CDP was split into the two separate CDP's of Sturgeon and Noblestown.

== Geography ==
Sturgeon-Noblestown was located at 40°23′2″N 80°12′33″W (40.383875, -80.209191).

According to the United States Census Bureau, the CDP had a total area of 2.9 square miles (7.4 km^{2}), all of it land.

== Demographics ==
As of the census of 2000, there were 1,764 people, 676 households, and 504 families residing in the CDP. The population density was 615.5 inhabitants per square mile (237.6/km^{2}). There were 715 housing units at an average density of 249.5 per square mile (96.3/km^{2}). The racial makeup of the CDP was 96.77% White, 2.27% African American, 0.11% Native American, 0.06% Asian, 0.06% from other races, and 0.74% from two or more races. Hispanic or Latino of any race were 0.45% of the population.

There were 676 households, out of which 37.9% had children under the age of 18 living with them, 63.8% were married couples living together, 7.2% had a female householder with no husband present, and 25.3% were non-families. 21.6% of all households were made up of individuals, and 10.4% had someone living alone who was 65 years of age or older. The average household size was 2.61 and the average family size was 3.05.

In the CDP, the population was spread out, with 27.0% under the age of 18, 4.7% from 18 to 24, 35.7% from 25 to 44, 19.6% from 45 to 64, and 13.0% who were 65 years of age or older. The median age was 36 years. For every 100 females, there were 98.0 males. For every 100 females age 18 and over, there were 98.9 males.

The median income for a household in the CDP was $48,056, and the median income for a family was $58,571. Males had a median income of $34,500 versus $22,042 for females. The per capita income for the CDP was $18,948. About 4.5% of families and 6.7% of the population were below the poverty line, including 10.3% of those under age 18 and 6.4% of those age 65 or over.
