= Sturgeon, Pennsylvania =

Unincorporated community in Pennsylvania, US

- Census-designated place
- Location in Allegheny County and state of Pennsylvania
- Coordinates: 40°23′6″N 80°12′55″W
- Country: United States
- State: Pennsylvania
- County: Allegheny
- Townships: North Fayette, South Fayette

Area
  - Total: 1.1 sq mi (2.8 km^{2})
  - Land: 1.1 sq mi (2.8 km^{2})
  - Water: 0 sq mi (0 km^{2})

Population (2020)
  - Total: 1,611
  - Density: 1,500/sq mi (570/km^{2})
- Time zone: UTC-5 (Eastern (EST))
  - Summer (DST): UTC-4 (EDT)
- ZIP code: 15082
- Area code: 724

Sturgeon is a census-designated place (CDP) in Allegheny County, Pennsylvania, United States. The community was part of the Sturgeon-Noblestown CDP for the 2000 census, but was split into two separate CDPs for the 2010 census. The population of Sturgeon was 1,611 at the 2020 census.

== Geography ==
Sturgeon is located at 40°23′06″N 80°12′55″W (40.3835, -80.2152).

According to the United States Census Bureau, the CDP has a total area of 1.1 square miles (2.8 km^{2}), all land.

== Education ==
Areas in North Fayette Township are in the West Allegheny School District while areas in South Fayette Township are in the South Fayette Township School District.
