= Jonathan Hayes =

American football player and coach (born 1962)

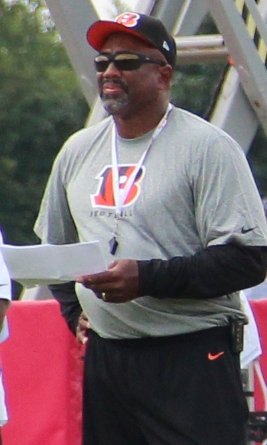
- Hayes in 2013

Moeller High School
- Title: Athletic director

Personal information
- Born: August 11, 1962 (age 64); South Fayette Township, Pennsylvania, U.S.
- Listed height: 6 ft 5 in (1.96 m)
- Listed weight: 248 lb (112 kg)

Career information
- High school: South Fayette (PA)
- College: Iowa
- NFL draft: 1985: 2nd round, 41st overall pick

Career history

Playing
- Kansas City Chiefs (1985–1993); Pittsburgh Steelers (1994–1996)

Coaching
- Oklahoma (1999–2002) Tight ends & special teams coach; Cincinnati Bengals (2003–2018) Tight ends coach; St. Louis BattleHawks (2020) Head coach & General manager; Arlington Renegades (2023) Co-offensive coordinator

Operations
- Moeller High School (2024–present) Athletic director

Awards and highlights
- As coach: XFL champion (2023); National champion (2000); As player: Second-team All-Big Ten (1984)

Career NFL statistics
- Receptions: 153
- Receiving yards: 1,718
- Receiving touchdowns: 13
- Stats at Pro Football Reference

Head coaching record
- Regular season: XFL: 3–2 (.600)

Jonathan Michael Hayes (born August 11, 1962) is an American football coach and former tight end. He previously served as the head coach of St. Louis Battlehawks as well as tight ends coach for Cincinnati Bengals of the National Football League (NFL), and the co-offensive coordinator for the Arlington Renegades of the United Football League (UFL). Hayes is currently the athletic director for Moeller High School in Cincinnati, Ohio.

== Early life ==
Hayes was raised by his parents, Jewett and Florence Hayes. His father worked as a parole officer and his mother worked for 39 years as a teacher. Hayes attended and graduated from South Fayette Township High School in South Fayette Township, Pennsylvania. Hayes's older brother Jay Hayes graduated from South Fayette Township High School three years earlier.

== Playing career ==
Hayes played college football for Iowa from 1982 to 1984. Hayes was recruited to Iowa after graduating from South Fayette Township High School in South Fayette Township, Pennsylvania. He played under Hall of Fame Coach Hayden Fry at Iowa. As a freshman, Hayes played defense and started for Iowa at linebacker. As a sophomore, he switched to tight end, where he had 10 receptions and 1 TD catch. As a junior, he had 42 catches for 512 yards and 6 TD catches. He decided to leave college early and declared for the 1985 NFL draft following his junior year. Hayes was named as an All-American following his junior season. Hayes is part of a tight end lineage at Iowa that had Marv Cook, Dallas Clark, Tony Moeaki, George Kittle, Noah Fant, T. J. Hockenson and Sam LaPorta and others following him in the program.

While playing at Iowa, Hayes was diagnosed with diabetes. He has worked with numerous diabetes organizations and sponsored events throughout his playing and coaching career to assist children and raise money for diabetes research.

After his career at Iowa, Hayes was drafted in the second round of the 1985 NFL Draft. He played for the Kansas City Chiefs (1985–1993) and the Pittsburgh Steelers (1994–1996).

== Coaching career ==
=== Oklahoma ===
Hayes's coaching career began at Oklahoma under Bob Stoops. While coaching in Norman, the 2000 Oklahoma Sooners football team won the BCS National Championship Game. At Oklahoma, Hayes coached Trent Smith, who was named to the 2001 and 2002 All-Big 12 Conference football team.

=== Cincinnati Bengals ===
Hayes joined Marvin Lewis's Cincinnati Bengals staff in 2003 and won 4 AFC North titles on the way to 7 NFL playoff berths. Hayes also coached several Pro Bowl players; Tyler Eifert (2015), and Jermaine Gresham (2011, 2012),

In January 2018, Hayes was the head coach of the East team in the 2018 East–West Shrine Game.

=== St. Louis BattleHawks ===
On April 18, 2019, Hayes was announced as the first head coach and general manager of the St. Louis BattleHawks franchise in the revived XFL.

=== Dallas Renegades ===
On June 9, 2022, Dallas Renegades head coach Bob Stoops hired Hayes to serve as his offensive coordinator for the 2023 XFL season. With Hayes as offensive coordinator, the renamed Arlington Renegades won the 2023 XFL championship, with a 35-26 victory over the D.C. Defenders in the championship game. His brother Jay Hayes, served as the co-defensive coordinator for the Renegades.

London Guard

On October 15th 2026 European Football Alliance team London Guard hired Hayes as Defensive Line Coach

== Head coaching record ==
=== XFL ===
Team	Year	Regular season					Postseason			
Team	Year	Won	Lost	Ties	Win %	Finish	Won	Lost	Win %	Result
STL	2020	3	2	0	.600	T-1st in XFL East	0	0	.000	TBD
Total		3	2	0	.600		0	0	.000	

== Personal life ==
Hayes's son, Jaxson, starred on the 2018–19 Texas Longhorns men's basketball team as a freshman and declared for the 2019 NBA draft. He was selected 8th overall by the Atlanta Hawks in the 2019 NBA Draft before being traded to the New Orleans Pelicans. Hayes's daughter, Jillian, committed as a member of the 2020 recruiting class to play college basketball at the University of Cincinnati. Hayes's wife, Kristi, was a scholarship basketball player at Drake and college women's basketball coach before getting married. On January 29, 2024, it was announced that Hayes became the new Athletic Director for Moeller High School.
