= Guy Amsler =

American judge (1895–1986)

The Honorable Guy Amsler

Associate Justice of the Arkansas Supreme Court
- In office April 1966 – December 1966
- Appointed by: Orval Faubus
- Preceded by: James D. Johnson
- Succeeded by: John A. Fogleman

Personal details
- Born: Ernest Guy Amsler; November 9, 1895 Leakesville, Mississippi, U.S.
- Died: May 25, 1986 (aged 90) Little Rock, Arkansas, U.S.
- Spouse: Ollie Buchanan Sanders
- Children: 1
- Education: University of Mississippi School of Law

Ernest Guy Amsler (November 9, 1895 – May 25, 1986) was an American attorney and jurist who served as an associate justice of the Arkansas Supreme Court in 1966.

== Early life, education, and career ==
Born in Leakesville, Greene County, Mississippi, as one of eleven children of Swiss immigrants Jakob Anton Friedrich Amsler and Flora McLeod Amsler, Amsler served in World War I and thereafter received a law degree from the University of Mississippi at Oxford in 1921.

He moved to Hamburg, Arkansas, where he began his legal practice and served as deputy prosecuting attorney for Ashley County, Arkansas. He later relocated to Little Rock to serve as executive secretary of the Arkansas Game and Fish Commission.

In 1935, Amsler joined attorney Lee Miles in private practice. During World War II, he volunteered for service and became an attorney for the U.S. Army Corps of Engineers. After the war, he resumed his law practice in Little Rock.

== Judicial service and later life ==
In 1948, Amsler was elected without opposition to a seat on the circuit court for the Sixth Judicial District, which had been vacated by the death of Judge L. C. Auten. Amsler held this position as circuit judge until April 1966, when Governor Orval Faubus appointed him to as seat on the Arkansas Supreme Court vacated by the resignation of Justice James D. Johnson, who was running for governor. Amsler served as an associate justice until December 1966.

After leaving the Supreme Court, Amsler chaired the board of trustees of the Arkansas Law School at Little Rock and the board of directors of Goodwill Industries, and served as president of the Arkansas Judicial Council.

== Personal life and death ==
In 1922, Amsler married Ollie Buchanan Sanders, with whom he had one son. Amsler died in Little Rock, Arkansas, at the age of 90, and was interred at Roselawn Cemetery.

Political offices
Preceded by James D. Johnson	Justice of the Arkansas Supreme Court; 1966–1966	Succeeded by John A. Fogleman
