= Winthrop Paul Rockefeller =

American politician (1948–2006)

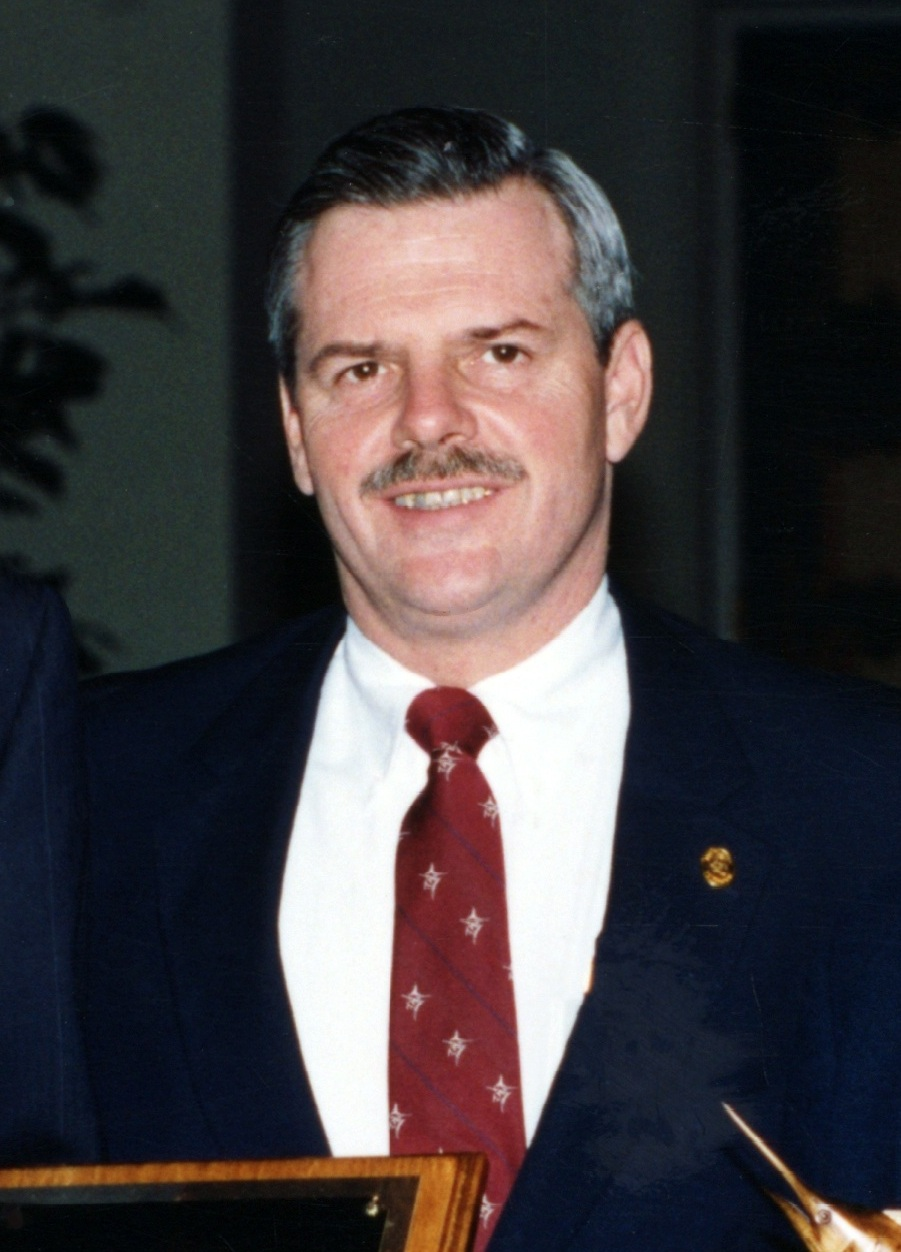
- Rockefeller in 1992

17th Lieutenant Governor of Arkansas
- In office November 19, 1996 – July 16, 2006
- Governor: Mike Huckabee
- Preceded by: Mike Huckabee
- Succeeded by: Bill Halter (2007)

Personal details
- Born: September 17, 1948 New York City, New York, U.S.
- Died: July 16, 2006 (aged 57) Little Rock, Arkansas, U.S.
- Party: Republican
- Spouses: Deborah Cluett Sage (m. 1971; div. 1979) Lisenne Dudderar (m. 1983)
- Children: 8
- Parent(s): Winthrop Rockefeller; Jievutė "Bobo" Paulekiūtė
- Relatives: See Rockefeller family
- Education: American College of Switzerland; Pembroke College, Oxford; Texas Christian University
- Profession: Politician; farmer; businessman

Winthrop Paul "Win" Rockefeller (September 17, 1948 – July 16, 2006) was an American Republican politician and businessman who served as the 17th lieutenant governor of Arkansas from 1996 until his death in 2006. He was a member of the Rockefeller family.

== Early life ==
Rockefeller was born in New York City, New York, the only child of Arkansas Governor Winthrop Rockefeller and actress Jievute "Bobo" Paulekiute. His parents separated in 1950 and divorced four years later. His maternal grandparents were Lithuanian.

Rockefeller grew up in both the United States and in Europe and was educated at schools in New York, England, and in Switzerland. He attended the American College of Switzerland, and Pembroke College, Oxford for one year, before graduating with a Certificate from the Ranch Management program at Texas Christian University in Fort Worth, Texas in 1974.

== Political career ==
Rockefeller served from 1981 to 1995 on the Arkansas State Police Commission. In 1991, he was appointed by President George H. W. Bush to serve on the President's Council on Rural America and became chairman of the council. He was a president of the Quapaw Area Council of the Boy Scouts of America and was on the board of directors of the national Scouting organization. Rockefeller's first foray into elective politics came when he won a narrow victory over Arkansas State Senator Charlie Cole Chaffin, the first woman elected to serve in the Arkansas State Senate and the 1994 nominee for Lieutenant Governor.

=== Lieutenant governor of Arkansas ===
The November 1996 special election was necessitated by the resignation of Governor Jim Guy Tucker and the elevation of Lieutenant Governor Mike Huckabee to the Governorship. Rockefeller was subsequently re-elected in 1998 to a full four-year term with 67 percent of the vote, over physician Dr. Kurt Dilday. This margin far greater than the vote received by his father in the 1966 and 1968 gubernatorial elections. Rockefeller was elected once again in 2002 with 60 percent of the vote, over Arkansas State Supreme Court Justice Ron Sheffield, the first Black man nominated for statewide office as a Democrat. Money was important to the race.

As Lieutenant Governor, Rockefeller was an avid proponent of the state’s economic interests, and he often traveled at his own expense to seek out potential foreign investors, while at the same time donating his own governmental salary to charity. As Acting Governor on September 11, 2001, the day terrorists attacked the World Trade Center and The Pentagon, he resisted calls to declare a state of emergency and instead urged Arkansans to remain calm and to donate blood. He sponsored Project ChildSafe, a national firearms safety program that has distributed hundreds of thousands of free trigger locks in Arkansas. He was honorary chairman of the Arkansas Literary Festival. In 1997, Rockefeller created Books in the Attic, a program using existing resources, Boy Scouts, and volunteers to ensure access to reading opportunities for all children. In 2004, he was chairman of the Arkansas Republican Party.

== Personal life ==
On March 22, 1971, Rockefeller married Deborah Cluett Sage of New York, the eldest daughter of Louis Davidson Sage and the former Constance Cluett Ward. The couple met while both were studying in Oxford, England. The wedding took place at the Bruton Parish Church at Colonial Williamsburg in Virginia.

The couple had three children:

- Andrea Davidson Rockefeller (b. July 31, 1972)
- Katherine Cluett Rockefeller (b. February 7, 1974)
- Winthrop Paul Rockefeller Jr. (b. July 10, 1976)

The couple divorced on January 11, 1979.

On June 4, 1983, Rockefeller married Lisenne Dudderar, an administrative assistant with the Arkansas Nature Conservancy. They had four sons:

- William Gordon Rockefeller (born 1986), who is managing director of Bank OZK, as well as on the leadership team of Rockefeller Capital Management and a variety of profit and nonprofit boards. In 2014, he married Caroline Farrior Boone of Tuscaloosa, Alabama.
- Colin Kendrick Rockefeller (born 1990), married in 2014 to Taylor Elise Stevens, at Winrock Farms.
- John Alexander Camp Rockefeller (born 1992)
- Louis Henry Rockefeller (born 1996), who was sentenced on one count of transfer of a machine gun, and ordered to serve 52 months in federal prison in March 2022.

They adopted a daughter, Grace, in Hong Kong. Win and Lisenne founded a school for children with learning disabilities in Little Rock, now known as the Academy at Riverdale.

== Wealth ==
Rockefeller was chief executive of Winrock Farms, Inc., which had been set up by his father, and had interests in various small businesses around the state: in retailing, automobiles, farming, and the resort industry. He was an active member of the National Federation of Independent Business. Rockefeller was ranked # 283 on the Forbes magazine list of the nation's wealthiest people in 2005, with a fortune the magazine estimated at $1.2 billion. As lieutenant governor, which was a part-time job, he forwarded his $34,673 state salary to charity.

== Illness and death ==
Rockefeller had announced his candidacy for governor and was expected to face Asa Hutchinson in the Republican primary election in May 2006. On July 20, 2005, however, he bowed out of the race due to his myeloproliferative disease, a blood disorder that can develop into leukemia if left untreated. In October 2005 and March 2006, Rockefeller underwent unsuccessful bone marrow transplants at the Fred Hutchinson Cancer Research Center in Seattle, Washington. On July 8, 2006, after the failure of his second bone marrow transplant, he returned to Little Rock, where he died eight days later at the University of Arkansas for Medical Sciences. On July 19, his body lay in state in the rotunda of the Arkansas State Capitol, and the next day, a memorial service was held at Pulaski Heights United Methodist Church, of which Rockefeller was a member.

The following November, then-Attorney General Mike Beebe, the Democrat who won the race for Governor of Arkansas by defeating Hutchinson, gave tribute to the late Rockefeller saying, "Had he lived, we all know I would not have been here but rather we would have been congratulating a good friend and a great Arkansan as the next Governor, Win Paul Rockefeller."

Party political offices
Preceded by Mike Huckabee	Republican nominee for Lieutenant Governor of Arkansas; 1996, 1998, 2002	Succeeded by Jim Holt
Political offices
Preceded by Mike Huckabee	Lieutenant Governor of Arkansas; November 19, 1996 – July 16, 2006	Succeeded by Bill Halter
