= 1956 Arkansas gubernatorial election =

- November 6, 1956
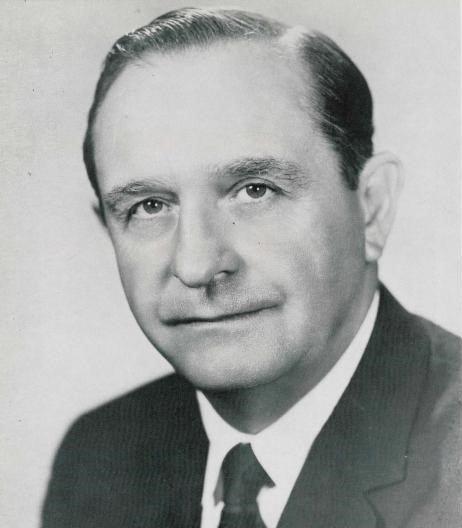

Nominee	Orval Faubus	Roy Mitchell
Party	Democratic	Republican
Popular vote	321,797	77,215
Percentage	80.65%	19.35%
- County results Faubus: 50–60% 60–70% 70–80% 80–90% >90%
Governor before election
Orval Faubus
Democratic
Elected Governor
Orval Faubus
Democratic

The 1956 Arkansas gubernatorial election was held on November 6, 1956.

Incumbent Democratic Governor Orval Faubus won election to a second term, defeating Republican nominee Roy Mitchell with 80.65% of the vote.

== Primary elections ==
Primary elections were held on July 31, 1956. By winning over 50% of the vote, Faubus avoided a run-off which would have been held on August 14, 1956.

=== Democratic primary ===
==== Candidates ====
- Orval Faubus, incumbent Governor
- James D. "Justice Jim" Johnson, lawyer, State Senator and leader of the Citizens' Councils
- Ben F. Pippin, retired businessman
- S. K. "Stew" Prosser, former U.S. Marine and state agency executive
- Jim Snoddy, former State Senator

==== Results ====
Democratic primary results
Party	Candidate	Votes	%
Democratic	Orval Faubus (incumbent)	180,760	58.08
Democratic	James D. Johnson	83,856	26.94
Democratic	Jim Snoddy	43,630	14.02
Democratic	S. K. Prosser	1,653	0.53
Democratic	Ben F. Pippin	1,328	0.43
Total votes		311,227	100.00

== General election ==
=== Candidates ===
- Orval Faubus, Democratic
- Roy Mitchell, Republican

=== Results ===
1956 Arkansas gubernatorial election
Party	Candidate	Votes	%	±%
Democratic	Orval Faubus (incumbent)	321,797	80.65%	+18.56%
Republican	Roy Mitchell	77,215	19.35%	−18.54%
Majority		244,582	61.30%	
Turnout		399,012	100.00%	
Democratic hold		Swing		

== Bibliography ==
- Gubernatorial Elections, 1787-1997. Washington, D.C.: Congressional Quarterly Inc. 1998. ISBN 1-56802-396-0.
