= American College of Switzerland =

Business school and liberal arts college

The American College of Switzerland (ACS) was a business school and liberal arts college in Leysin, Switzerland in the canton of Vaud.

== History ==
The American College of Switzerland, based in the Swiss village of Leysin (Vaud), was founded by Dr. Fred Ott in 1963.

== Campus ==
The campus was housed in the modernized Victorian style building of Les Frenes, built in the late 1800s, which became a sanatorium of the Dr. Rollier health complex in the early 1900s. A private train station connected Leysin to all main lines and cities in Switzerland.

== Alumni ==
Some notable alumni include Glenne Headley (who attended on a full scholarship), Sylvester Stallone and Winthrop Paul Rockefeller.

== Ownership changes ==
In the 1990s, it was acquired by Schiller International University. In 2007, Knowledge Investment Partners Inc. acquired Schiller International University, along with the American College of Switzerland. The result was that in 2009 the American College of Switzerland was officially closed.
