= 1966 Arkansas gubernatorial election =

- November 8, 1966
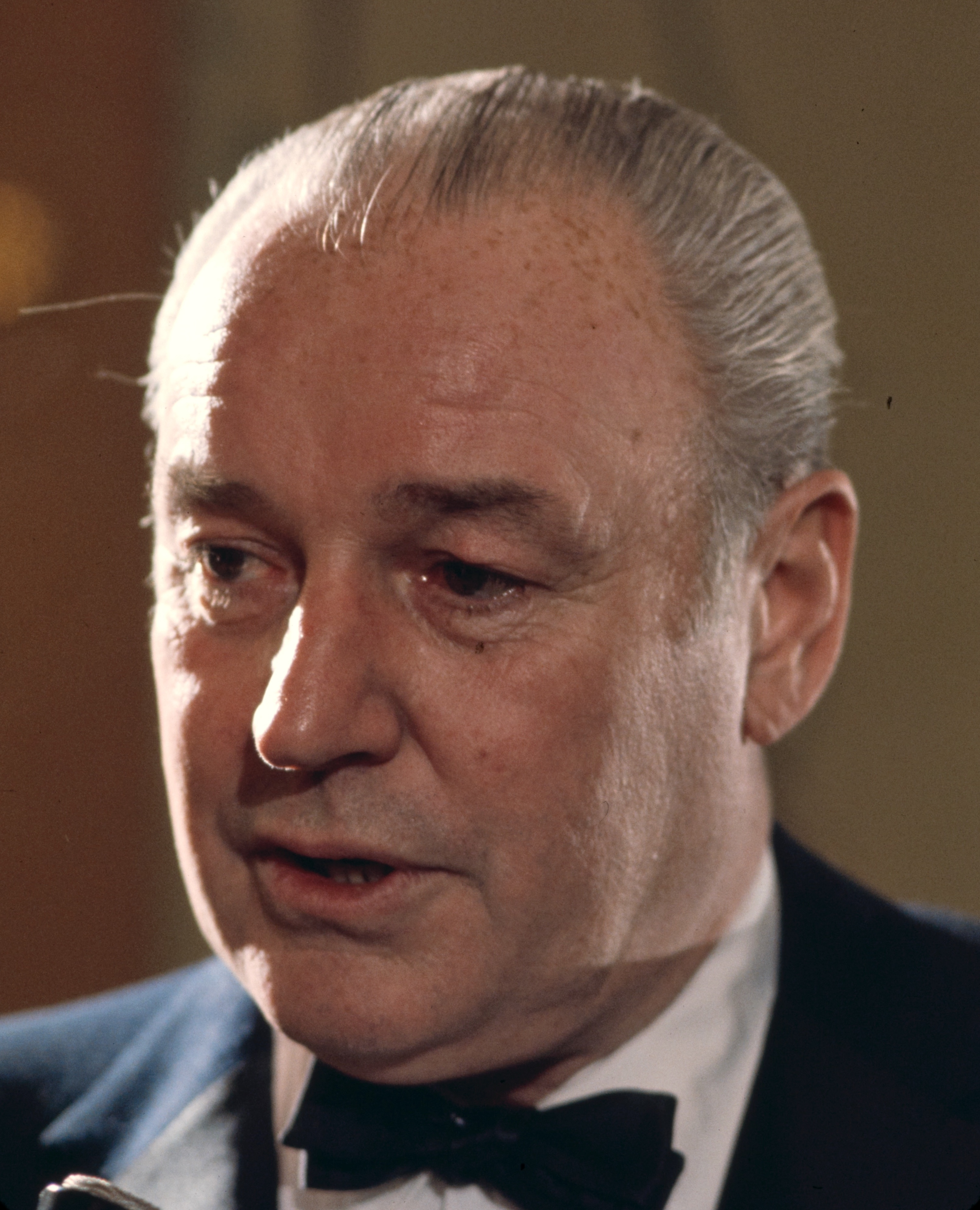

Nominee	Winthrop Rockefeller	James D. Johnson
Party	Republican	Democratic
Popular vote	306,324	257,203
Percentage	54.36%	45.64%
- County results Rockefeller: 50–60% 60–70% 70–80% Johnson: 50–60% 60–70% 70–80%
Governor before election
Orval Faubus
Democratic
Elected Governor
Winthrop Rockefeller
Republican

The 1966 Arkansas gubernatorial election was held in the US state on November 8, 1966. Winthrop Rockefeller was elected governor of Arkansas, becoming the first Republican to be elected to the office since Reconstruction in 1872.

The election occurred amidst strong midterm results for the Republican Party nationally, and in the traditionally-Democratic South. Republicans concurrently won the governorship of Florida also for the first time since Reconstruction, and only narrowly lost the governorship of Georgia, despite winning a plurality of the vote.

== Democratic primary ==
Popular and powerful six-term (since 1955) incumbent Orval E. Faubus decided against seeking re-election. "Justice Jim" Johnson, a political ally of George C. Wallace of Alabama, ran a segregationist campaign with support of the White Citizens Council. A decade earlier, Johnson had run in the Democratic primary against Faubus, another segregationist, whom he accused of working behind the scenes for racial integration.

=== Candidates ===
- Thomas Dale Alford, former U.S. Representative and candidate for governor in 1962
- Sam Boyce, attorney and former State Representative
- Brooks Hays, former U.S. Representative and candidate for governor in 1930
- Frank Holt, State Supreme Court Associate Justice and Attorney General
- James D. "Justice Jim" Johnson, State Supreme Court Associate Justice, former State Senator and candidate for governor in 1956
- Raymond Rebsamen, insurance executive and Ford dealer
- Kenneth S. Sulcer, state senator and real estate broker

=== Results ===
July 26 Democratic primary results
Party	Candidate	Votes	%
Democratic	James D. Johnson	105,607	25.14
Democratic	Frank Holt	92,711	22.07
Democratic	Brooks Hays	64,814	15.43
Democratic	Thomas Dale Alford	53,531	12.74
Democratic	Sam Boyce	49,744	11.84
Democratic	Raymond Rebsamen	35,607	8.48
Democratic	Kenneth S. Sulcer	18,051	4.30
Total votes		420,065	100.00

August 9 Democratic runoff results
Party	Candidate	Votes	%
Democratic	James D. Johnson	210,543	51.86
Democratic	Frank Holt	195,442	48.14
Total votes		405,985	100.00

Holt was supported by many younger, more liberal, Democrats, such as future governor and U.S. President Bill Clinton, who served as his campaign aide though he was not old enough to vote at the time.

== Republican primary ==
A northeastern native, multimillionaire and scion of a prominent political/business family Winthrop Rockefeller was nominated with over 96% of the vote over Gus McMillan of Sheridan. Charges abounded that McMillan, a lifelong Democrat, was planted in the race by Faubus in order to force the Republicans to hold an expensive and needless primary. Rockefeller had been the GOP nominee in the 1964 election.

== Campaign ==
Rockefeller was an unusual candidate – an eastern establishment member and moderate-to-liberal party wing member (such as his brother, Governor Nelson Rockefeller of New York, an unofficial leader of this wing for many years).

The Republican Party at this time practically played only a most minor role in Arkansas politics.

However, his popularity and the break within Democratic camp, where many were outraged with Johnson's segregationist stances, and good year for the Republicans nationally helped Rockefeller to win.

== Results ==
Arkansas gubernatorial election, 1966
Party	Candidate	Votes	%
Republican	Winthrop Rockefeller	306,324	54.36
Democratic	James D. Johnson	257,203	45.64
Total votes		563,527	100.00
