= South Fayette Township School District =

School district in Pennsylvania

Coordinates: 40.37991°N 80.17237°W

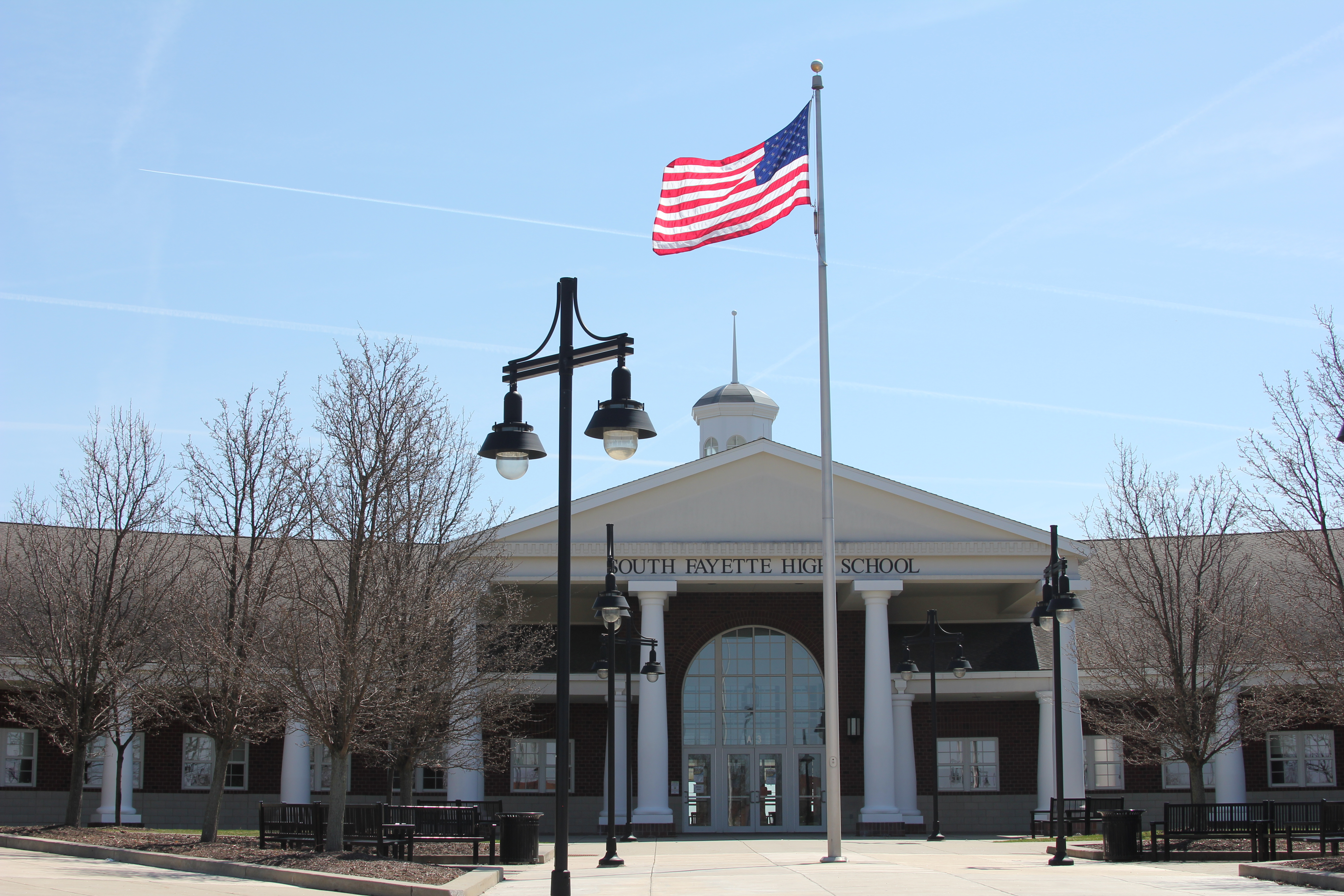

Address
- 3680 Old Oakdale Road McDonald, Pennsylvania, (Allegheny County); United States

District information
- Type: Public
- Motto: "Tradition, Pride, and Excellence"

Students and staff
- District mascot: Lion
- Colors: Kelly Green & white

Other information
- Website: www.southfayette.org

The South Fayette Township School District is a suburban, public school district serving the Pittsburgh suburb of South Fayette Township, Pennsylvania. The district encompasses approximately 21 square miles (54 km^{2}). In 2010, the district's population was 14,416 people. In 2009, the district residents’ per capita income was $26,082, while the median family income was $65,473. In the Commonwealth, the median family income was $49,501 and the United States median family income was $49,445, in 2010.

South Fayette Township School District operates four schools: South Fayette High School (9th-12th), South Fayette Middle School (6th-8th), South Fayette Intermediate School (3rd-5th) and South Fayette Elementary School (K-2nd). The Intermediate School was put into use in time for the 2013–2014 school year. A new elementary school is currently under construction as of October 2026.

== Extracurricular activities ==
The district offers a variety of clubs, activities and an extensive sports program.

=== Band ===
South Fayette High School has been home to the “Little Green Machine” Marching Band for more that 60 years. Content is created entirely by the band's members; the graduating class assumes responsibility of choreography while the director arranges the music. Much of what the band practices today has been passed down through generations of South Fayette students and directors, including its three-part audition process and “rookie” spot rotation. Another key element of the Little Green Machine tradition requires all majorettes to successfully complete one full year as an instrumentalist in the band before auditioning to become a majorette. In addition to numerous performances at Pittsburgh Steelers games, the band has performed in the New York City St. Patrick's Day Parade, the Walt Disney World “Magic Music Days” Parade and many other high visibility venues across the East Coast. In 1994, the band was profiled in a Fox Sports Profile. In 2010, it was awarded the County Executive's Award and deemed the best marching band in the county.

=== Clubs ===
Clubs/activities in the Middle School include:

- Newspaper Club
- Lion Hearts Club
- Stage Crew
- Future Business Leaders of America (FBLA)
- Art Club
- Library Club
- Chess Club
- Drama Club
- Student Council
- Middle School Best Buddies
- Yearbook Club
- Girls Who Code + Friends
- Environmental Club
- Baking Club
- Screen Printing Club
- Middle School Musical
- Chamber Choir
- UNESCO Club
- French Club
- German Club
- Esports
- Jazz Ensemble
- SHOUT - Social Handprints Overcoming Unjust Treatment
- Unified Robotics
- Speech and Debate Club
- Media Club
- Gender Sexuality Alliance (GSA)

Club/activities in the High School include:

- After School Chorus
- Art Club
- Best Buddies
- Cash Club
- Chamber Strings
- Chess Club
- Class Council - Freshmen + Sophomores
- Class Council - Juniors + Seniors
- Comic Book Club
- Competitive Programming and Math Club (CPMC)
- Drama Club
- Early Childhood Development Club
- Fall Showcase
- Future Business Leaders of America (FBLA)
- French Club
- Future Educators Association
- Gender Sexualtiy Alliance (GSA)
- German Club
- Girl's Steam Team
- Health Career's Club (HOSA)
- Interact
- Jazz Ensemble
- Library Club
- National Honor Society
- Media Club
- Mini-THON
- Model United Nations
- Prom Committee
- Quiz Bowl
- Robotics (Bots IQ)
- Science Bowl
- SF BeWell
- SFHS Mane Store
- SF Reads
- Ski and Board Club
- SHOUT - Social Handprints Overcoming Unjust Treatment
- Stage Crew
- STEAM Team
- SADD - Students Agaisnt Destructive Decisions
- Student Government
- Technology Student Association (TSA)
- Ultimate Frisbee

=== Athletics ===
The following sports are offered to students in grades 9-12:

- Fall Season:
  - Varsity and Junior Varsity Football,
  - Varsity and Junior Varsity Cross-country
  - Boys Varsity and Junior Varsity Soccer
  - Girls Varsity and Junior Varsity Soccer
  - Varsity Golf
  - Girls Varsity and Junior Varsity Volleyball
  - Girls Varsity and Junior Varsity Tennis
  - Varsity and Junior Varsity Cheerleading
- Winter Season:
  - Boys Varsity and Junior Varsity Basketball
  - Girls Varsity and Junior Varsity Basketball
  - Boys/Girls Varsity Swimming
  - Varsity and Junior Varsity Wrestling
  - Varsity and Junior Varsity Cheerleading
  - Hockey
  - Track (indoor)
- Spring Season:
  - Boys Varsity and Junior Varsity Baseball
  - Girls Varsity & Junior Varsity Softball
  - Boys Tennis
  - Varsity and Junior Varsity Track
  - Boys Lacrosse, Girls Lacrosse

In February 2010, the Boys Basketball Team won the PIAA State Championship in State College, Pennsylvania.

In November 2010, 2013, and 2014 the Football team won the WPIAL championship

In December 2013 and 2014, the Football team won the PIAA State Championship in Hershey, Pennsylvania, for the third and Fourth time in the history of the school.

In 2023, the South Fayette High School boys' ice hockey team won the PIHL Class AA Penguins Cup, defeating Armstrong 2–0 in the championship game. Five days later, South Fayette defeated Pennsbury 7–4 at the Robert Morris University Island Sports Center to win the Pennsylvania Cup Class AA state championship, the first state championship in program history.

=== Controversies ===
In April 2014, it was reported that Christian Stanfield, a sophomore at South Fayette High, was brought up on charges of disorderly conduct after he recorded several people bullying him. When he reported it to school officials, they forced him to delete the video and called police to report that Stanfield may have violated the state's wiretapping law; Pennsylvania law requires all parties to consent to being recorded. The police opted to charge him with disorderly conduct, a charge that was upheld by a judge. However, the charges were later dropped by the Allegheny County District. Attorney

Former wrestling head coach Michael Ladick was fired in 2011 after 3 season as coach due to increasing demand from parents.

In 2017, former South Fayette High School assistant football coach ,Patrick Onesko, was found guilty after soliciting two students of South Fayette through Snapchat. Patrick had been working at California University of Pennsylvania when the messaging began. Patrick told the boys that he was a 15-year-old girl from Bethel Park. He used the screen name ALAINABP5. The messages between the boys and Patrick included Patrick asking about the boys genitals and the boys calling Patrick a pedophile. The jurors found that Mr. Onesko was guilty of all counts against him: solicitation, unlawful contact with a minor and two counts of corruption of minors.

In May 2019, a 15-year-old student was suspended from South Fayette High School for retaliating against a white classmate who repeatedly called him a racial slur at lunch.

In March 2021, teacher Donald Sekelik was suspended after his 10th-grade World Cultures class was told to imagine themselves as retired captains in the British navy and asked, “Is the slave trade profitable?”. According to the assignment, students needed to determine if, economically, they would profit more with a large "pack" of Africans who had lower odds of surviving the trip to America, or a smaller one with a better chance at survival.

== Notable alumni ==
- Fred Mannering, Current Professor of civil and environmental engineering at the University of South Florida, Former head of civil engineering at Purdue, Highly Cited Researcher, member of the U.S. National Academy of Engineering.
- Jonathan Hayes, former tight end for the Kansas City Chiefs and Pittsburgh Steelers, former tight end coach for the University of Oklahoma and the Cincinnati Bengals, Head Coach & General Manager of the St. Louis Battlehawks.
- Jenna Morasca, Winner of Survivor: The Amazon,emergency veterinary nurse supervisor, swimsuit model.
- Justin Watson, wide receiver for the Houston Texans
