= James D. Johnson =

American judge and lawyer (1924–2010)

James Douglas Johnson

Associate Justice of the Arkansas Supreme Court
- In office 1959–1966
- Preceded by: William J. Smith
- Succeeded by: Guy Amsler

Member of the Arkansas Senate from the Twenty-second district
- In office January 12, 1953 – 1957
- Preceded by: (redistricting)
- Succeeded by: Gaither C. Johnston
- Constituency: Ashley and Chicot counties

Member of the Arkansas Senate from the Twenty-seventh district
- In office January 8, 1951 – January 12, 1953
- Preceded by: Ohmer C. Burnside
- Succeeded by: (redistricting)
- Constituency: Ashley and Chicot counties

Personal details
- Born: August 20, 1924 Crossett, Arkansas, U.S.
- Died: February 13, 2010 (aged 85) Conway, Arkansas, U.S.
- Party: Democratic (1950–80); Independent (1980–83); Republican (1983–2010)
- Spouse: Virginia Lillian Morris Johnson (m. 1947; died 2007)
- Children: Mark Johnson; John David Johnson; Joseph Daniel Johnson
- Education: Cumberland University
- Occupation: Attorney, politician

Military service
- Allegiance: United States
- Branch/service: United States Marine Corps
- Years of service: 1942
- Rank: Corporal
- Battles/wars: World War II

James Douglas Johnson (August 20, 1924 – February 13, 2010), known as "Justice Jim" Johnson, was an Arkansas legislator and jurist known for outspoken support of racial segregation during the mid-20th century. He served as an associate justice of the Arkansas Supreme Court from 1959 to 1966, and in the Arkansas Senate from 1951 to 1957. Johnson unsuccessfully sought several elected positions, including Governor of Arkansas in 1956 and 1966, the United States Senate in 1968, and Chief Justice of the Arkansas Supreme Court in 1976, 1980, and 1984. A segregationist, Johnson was frequently compared to George Wallace of Alabama. He joined the Republican Party in 1983.

== Early life and career ==
Johnson was a native of Crossett in southern Arkansas near the Louisiana state line. He was the son of T. W. and Myrtle née Long Johnson, who owned and operated a grocery store in the sawmill town. During World War II, Johnson was drafted into the United States Marine Corps, serving in the Pacific Theater. After the war, Johnson attended Cumberland University, married Conway-native Virginia Lillian Morris, and returned to Crossett to start a law practice. She would serve as his legal secretary for the rest of her life.

Johnson was said to have admired the political style of Huey Long, but was to Long's political right. His interest in politics grew following the 1948 Democratic National Convention and formation of the Dixiecrat party. When former Governor of Arkansas Benjamin T. Laney recommended Johnson run for office, he sought the District 27 seat in the Arkansas Senate, which covered Ashley and Chicot counties. He was seated in the 58th Arkansas General Assembly.

Following the United States Supreme Court Brown v. Board of Education decision in 1954, Johnson sought to use segregation as a wedge issue for many campaigns thereafter. He brought the Citizens' Councils to Arkansas to stoke the white backlash created in the wake of Brown v. Board, and seized on the pending integration of Hoxie School District as a hot-button issue ahead of the 1956 gubernatorial election. Johnson also drafted and flogged an interposition amendment to the Arkansas Constitution and used red-baiting to raise the temperature around integration in Hoxie and raise his public profile.

In 1956, Johnson declined to run for another term in the legislature, instead seeking to challenge incumbent Governor Orval Faubus in the Democratic primary during the Solid South period, in which winning the Democratic primary was tantamount to election. Johnson accused the segregationist Faubus of working behind the scenes for racial integration, but finished a distant second with 83,856 votes (26.9%) Faubus went on to handily defeat Republican Roy Mitchell in the 1956 gubernatorial election for a second two-year term as governor.

Being a staunch and lifelong segregationist, in 1955, in response to school integration occurring in Hoxie, Johnson proposed an amendment to the Arkansas constitution that would prohibit integration. Johnson also played a role in the Little Rock Nine crisis. He claimed to have hoaxed Governor Faubus into calling out the National Guard, supposedly to prevent a white mob from stopping the integration of Little Rock Central High School: "There wasn't any caravan. But we made Orval believe it. We said. 'They're lining up. They're coming in droves.' ... The only weapon we had was to leave the impression that the sky was going to fall." He later claimed that Faubus asked him to raise a mob to justify his actions. He was elected to the Arkansas Supreme Court in 1958 and served until 1966, when he resigned to run again for governor.

== Campaigns of 1966 and 1968 ==
Johnson made four more bids for office, all unsuccessful. In 1968, he sought the Democratic nomination for the U.S. Senate in the Democratic Primary against J. William Fulbright while his wife, Virginia, sought the Democratic nod in the Governor's race to challenge the reelection of 1966 foe Rockefeller. Both lost, yet Johnson headed the third party effort of former Alabama Governor George Wallace while running for the Senate as a Democrat. In 1972, he lent key support to Senator John McLellan in a tight runoff against Representative David Pryor. He passed on a second run against Fulbright in 1974, opting instead to support the comeback bid of Orval Faubus for Governor, which he lost to Pryor.

In 1976, he unsuccessfully challenged the re-election bid of Chief Justice Carleton Harris of the Arkansas Supreme Court, but lost with 44% of the vote. In 1980, expressing alarm that Pulaski County Circuit Judge Richard Adkisson, who Johnson considered too liberal, would succeed Harris as Chief Justice, Johnson mounted a petition drive to get on the ballot as an Independent, but fell short of the required signatures. Adkisson won the Democratic primary and was unopposed in the general election.

After his son, Mark Johnson, was appointed to the cabinet of Governor Frank White (a Republican), Johnson hinted he would switch parties. In 1983 he did so and ran as the GOP nominee for Chief Justice in 1984, but lost by a 58-42% margin to Jack Holt, Jr., a nephew of Frank Holt, whom Johnson had defeated for the gubernatorial nomination in 1966.

== Later years ==
In the 1982, Jim and Virginia Johnson supported the re-election of Governor Frank D. White, Arkansas' second Republican governor since Reconstruction. White, however, was unseated by Bill Clinton, after a single term. Johnson had a long-standing enmity with Clinton. While he had been a student at Georgetown University in Washington, D.C., Clinton was a campaign aide for Johnson's 1966 runoff opponent, Judge Frank Holt. Twelve years later, Clinton would win the governorship. In reference to Johnson's overtly racist views and dirty campaign tactics, Clinton once told Johnson, "You make me ashamed to be from Arkansas." Years later, Johnson replied that he was ashamed Arkansas had produced "a president of the United States who is a queer-mongering, whore-hopping adulterer; a baby-killing, draft-dodging, dope-tolerating, lying, two-faced, treasonous activist." He also appeared in Jerry Falwell’s The Clinton Chronicles and was a paid consultant for the Arkansas Project.

During the Whitewater controversy, Johnson made accusations against Clinton based on a continuing opposition research campaign conducted by Republican political consultants, Floyd Brown and David Bossie. A client of Johnson's, David Hale, a former municipal court judge, was the special prosecutor's chief witness attempting to link Clinton to the Whitewater scandal. Hale's testimony was deemed to have been of no import, as he had agreed to testify under plea bargaining to secure a better deal on his own indictment for fraud.

Unlike George Wallace, who repented of his segregationist past, Johnson doubled down during his 1966 campaign for Governor, and refused to shake hands with black voters. Endorsed by the Ku Klux Klan, he campaigned against "mongrelization" – a stance for which he never apologized. In 1996, he said: "I have to admit that I have not grown to the point where I am not uncomfortable when I see a mixed couple. It causes me discomfort. But I say in the same breath that when I see a drunk it causes me discomfort."

== Death ==
The Faulkner County Sheriff's Office reported that Johnson was found dead about 10 a.m. on Saturday, February 13, 2010, at his home off Beaverfork Lake with a self-inflicted gunshot wound to the chest. Rice said a rifle was found, and authorities had no reason to suspect foul play. He had been suffering from cancer.

Party political offices
Preceded by Orval Faubus	Democratic nominee for Governor of Arkansas; 1966	Succeeded by Marion H. Crank
