= GOJO Jonesboro Public Transit =

Public transportation system in Arkansas

GOJO
- Founded: 2006
- Headquarters: 2630 Lacy Dr.
- Locale: Jonesboro, AR
- Service area: Jonesboro, AR
- Service type: bus service, paratransit
- Routes: 5
- Hubs: GOJO Regional Transfer Center (713 S. Caraway Rd.)
- Annual ridership: 85,759 (2022)
- Website: https://www.jonesboroar.gov/281/GOJO-Jonesboros-Public-Transit-System

GOJO, previously Jonesboro Economical Transit System or JETS, is the public transportation system in Jonesboro, the largest city in northeastern Arkansas. There are three scheduled bus routes and paratransit service is provided for individuals who cannot use the regular fixed-route bus service.

GOJO is a member of the Arkansas Transit Association.

== Operations ==
GOJO was launched on May 4, 2006 under the name of Jonesboro Economical Transit System, with three buses operating on 3 fixed routes (15,35,55) and 4 paratransit vans. As of 2018, there are five fixed routes, with five buses normally running those routes (17, 27, 37, 43, 53). Hours of operation are from 5:00 am to 7:00 pm on weekdays, with limited Saturday service also available on select routes.

JETS was officially rebranded to GOJO on March 4th of 2026 during a City of Jonesboro’s State of the City Address.

=== Regional Transfer Station ===
The Regional Transfer Station serves as the primary transfer hub for GOJO, with connections to Greyhound Lines buses at Caraway Road and Matthews Avenue. The $1.1 million project broke ground on April 30, 2015 and opened on October 23 that year. The new facility provides space for eight buses and a 2,000 square foot waiting area for passengers.

=== Routes ===
- 17 Central
- 27 Downtown West
- 37 North
- 43 South Central
- 53 East

== Fixed route ridership ==
The ridership statistics shown here are of fixed route services only and do not include demand response services.

== See also ==
- List of bus transit systems in the United States
- Walnut Ridge station
