= List of caves in Arkansas =

Arkansas, with its karst topography, is home to many caves. This list compiles those with Wikipedia articles.

== Show caves ==
- Onyx Cave
- Cosmic Cavern
- Mystic Caverns and Crystal Dome
- Old Spanish Treasure Cave
- Blanchard Springs Caverns
- Bull Shoals Caverns

== Wild caves ==
- Fitton Cave

== See also ==
- List of caves in the United States
