= Arkansas Transit Association =

Non-profit organisation in the USA

Incorporated in 1980, the Arkansas Transit Association provides services for more than 200 members, consisting of urban and rural public transit systems and agencies, non-profit human service agencies, related commercial businesses and vendor associate members.

They offer a broad range of training programs in partnership with the Arkansas State Highway and Transportation Department.

ATA Member Public Transit Systems
Agency	Location	Website
BRAD Public Transit	Pocahontas	BRAD
Eureka Springs Transit System	Eureka Springs	eurekatrolley.org
Fort Smith Transit	Fort Smith	FST
Hot Springs Intracity Transit	Hot Springs	Intracity Transit
GOJO	Jonesboro	letsgo.jonesboro.org
Mid Delta Transit	Helena	Transit
North Arkansas Transportation Services	Harrison	NATS
North East Arkansas Transit	Jonesboro	NEAT
Ozark Regional Transit	Springdale	ozark.org
Pine Bluff Transit	Pine Bluff	Transit
Razorback Transit	Fayetteville	Transit Operations
Rock Region METRO	North Little Rock	RR METRO
South Central Arkansas Transit	Malvern	SCAT
Southeast Arkansas Transportation	Pine Bluff	SEAT
Texarkana Urban Transit District	Texarkana	t-linebus.org
Western Transit Service	Fort Smith	WTS
