= Bull Shoals Caverns =

Limestone cavern in Bull Shoals, Arkansas, United States

- Interactive map of Bull Shoals Caverns
- Location: Bull Shoals, AR
- Coordinates: 36°22′47″N 92°35′02″W

Bull Shoals Caverns is a limestone cavern located in Bull Shoals, Arkansas.

The caverns were created approximately 350 million years ago, during the Ordovician period and were carved out by water method. The caverns were formed by water seeping into the cracks of the rocks, gradually enlarging the cracks and dissolving the surrounding rocks. There is an underground river that flows through the caverns.

Bull Shoals Caverns has been open since 1958.

== History ==
- Human dwelling was first documented starting 300 B.C. via carbon dating.
- The first Native Americans to use this cave were the Cliff Walkers which have been inhabiting caves for 10,000 years throughout Central North America as well as other tribes.
- Early settlers in the late 1800s to early 1900s would use utilize the caverns as a well cooler aka (refrigerator).
- During the American Civil War, Confederate soldiers use the cavern for harvesting saltpeter.
- In the early to middle 1900s, moonshiners utilized the cavern as a hideout for their stills during Prohibition. Due to a lack of good roads, moonshiners were not bothered by “Revenuers”. During World War II, Bull Shoals Caverns was used for refrigeration by the surrounding neighbors for whiskey and food storage.
