= List of flatiron buildings =

List of buildings shaped like a clothing iron

Over a hundred notable buildings shaped like a flatiron have been built worldwide. Such buildings are typically constructed at an intersection of streets or railway tracks that meet at an acute angle. One of the most famous is the Flatiron Building in New York City, which was finished in 1902.

== Australia ==
Building	Image	Dates	Location	City, Province	Description
Sydney Dental Hospital		1940 built	Chalmers Street, Surry Hills; 33°53′4″S 151°12′28″E	Sydney, New South Wales	Streamline Moderne
Wales House, Sydney		1922-29 built	Pitt Street; 33.8653°S 151.2090°E	Sydney, New South Wales	
OMNIA		2018 completed	Victoria Street; 33.8745°S 151.2225°E	Sydney, New South Wales	Adaptive re-use of the Crest Hotel.
Darlinghurst Fire Station		1911 built 1912 opened	Victoria Street; 33.876030°S 151.221770°E	Sydney, New South Wales	
The Meudon, Onslow Court		1927 designed 1927-8 built	Onslow Avenue, Elizabeth Bay; 33.870635°S 151.2264°E	Sydney, New South Wales	Designed in the Inter-War Free Classical style by architects Crane & Scott.
Griffith Teas building		1912 - 1915 built	Wentworth Avenue, Surry Hills 33.87885°S 151.2108°E	Sydney, New South Wales	Kent, Budden & Greenwell original architects; adaptive reuse by PopovBass. Despite its more quadrilateral shape, referenced by commentators as resembling the Flatiron building.
OJ Williams building		1939 built	corner Pacific Highway and Willoughby Road, Crows Nest. 33.827545°S 151.200801°E	Sydney, New South Wales	Builders Robert Wall & Sons
Marcus Clark 'Flatiron' Store		1906 built	814 George Street, Haymarket. 33.882332663377134°S 151.20464845148555°E	Sydney, New South Wales	Designed by James Nangle for Marcus Clark and Co. and modelled on the Fuller building
FV Flatiron		completed 2017	179 Alfred Street in Fortitude Valley, Brisbane-27.4566° S 153.0347° E	Fortitude Valley, Brisbane	Developed by the Gurner Group and designed by Elenberg Fraser

== Austria ==
Building	Image	Dates	Location	City, Region	Description
The Flatiron, Vienna		1890 built	Magdalenstrasse 22; 48.1959°N 16.3536°E	Vienna (city and federal state)	Vienna Stadtbaumeister Georg Löwitsch architect
Palais Fanto		1917-18 built	Schwarzenbergplatz 6; 48.19913°N 16.3775°E	Vienna (city and federal state)	

== Canada ==
Building	Image	Dates	Location	City, Province	Description
Gibson Block		1913 built	Jasper Ave. 53.54360°N 113.48248°W	Edmonton, Alberta	
Flatiron Building (Lacombe, Alberta)		1904 built	50 Ave. & 49c Ave. 52.46298°N 113.73083°W	Lacombe, Alberta	
Hotel Europe (Vancouver)		1909 built	43 Powell Street; 49°17′0.23″N 123°6′13.13″W	Vancouver, British Columbia	
Woodward's 43		2010 built	128 West Cordova Street 49°16′58.6″N 123°6′29.1″W	Vancouver, British Columbia	
Coffin Block Building		1830s	Front Street and Wellington Street at Church Street	Toronto, Ontario	First flatiron building in Toronto; demolished in the 1890s and replaced by the Gooderham Building (see below).
Gooderham Building, aka Flatiron Building		1892 built 1975 Ontario landmark	49 Wellington Street East; 43.64842678851329°N 79.37426220821774°W	Toronto, Ontario	Romanesque Revival
25 The Esplanade		1988 built	25 The Esplanade; 43.64622°N 79.37513°W	Toronto, Ontario	
CIBC branch at 90 Danforth Avenue at Broadview Avenue		c. 1918	90 Danforth Avenue at Broadview Avenue; 43.67642582180832°N 79.35874956190627°W	Toronto	by V.C. Horsburgh
former Dominion Bank at 533 St Clair Avenue West at Vaughan Road		c. 1912	533 St Clair Avenue West at Vaughan Road; 43.682705765659776°N 79.41958136043066°W	Toronto, Ontario	
Moses Block		1907 built	Durham at Elgin Street; 46.490095657203746°N 80.99525406949496°W	Sudbury, Ontario	A historic site in Sudbury, completed sometime between 1907 and 1915 by Hascal Moses and the Moses Family. The building was branded 'Flat Iron Building' under the eaves.
The Delta Block		1917 built 1922 second level added	Main St. and King St. 43.24391°N 79.82470°W	Hamilton, Ontario	Pizza Pizza.
Rodier Building		1875 built	932 rue Notre-Dame Ouest / rue Saint-Maurice45.497347815494386°N 73.56173850380051°W	Montreal, Québec	"Heritage Montreal, an organization dedicated to the protection of Montreal's heritage has placed this building in its list of ten threatened emblematic sites for 2012."
The Dalby Building		1865 built	143 Metcalfe Street; 43.682982126032165°N 80.43016816779567°W	Elora, Ontario	Designed by W.H.L. LaPenotiere and constructed in 1865, The Dalby Building has a storied history as one of Elora's first hotels, hosting council and society meetings, banquets, and even court sessions for the early villagers. It also ran Elora's earliest stagecoach operation. Operating as a hotel under various proprietors for over a century until the early 2000s, it has recently been returned to its roots with the summer 2025 opening of The Ayrshire Hotel. The Dalby Building is the oldest known surviving flatiron building in Canada.

== China ==
Building	Image	Dates	Location	City, Region	Description
Wukang Mansion, aka Normandie Apartments		1924 completed	1836–1858 Middle Huaihai Road, Xuhui District; 31.2045°N 121.4383°E	Shanghai (city and province)	Compare: Normandie Hotel
Oi Kwan Hotel (Chinese: 爱群大酒店)		1937 completed	113 Yanjiang W Road; 23.10956°N 113.255001°E	Guangzhou, Guangdong	

== Croatia ==
- Pegla (Zadar, Croatia)

== Ecuador ==
Building	Image	Dates	Location	City, Province	Description
Casa Vacas de Ortega		1910 built	Calle Guayaquil and Calle Montúfar 0.21981°S 78.50542°W	Quito, Pichincha	Designed in an eclectic style by an unknown architect.

== Finland ==
Building	Image	Dates	Location	City, Region	Description
Silitysrautatalo ("Flatiron building"), Helsinki		1888 built, 1937 renovated	Vuorimiehenkatu 4, Ullanlinna; 60.1605°N 24.9544°E	Helsinki, Uusimaa	Originally built to a design by Selim A. Lindqvist. Later comprehensively redesigned by Max Frelander in functionalist style, adding three more stories.

== France ==
Building	Image	Dates	Location	City, Region	Description
Flat Iron, Paris		1947 built 2024 refurbished	19-25 rue Boissonade; 48.8391°N 2.3334°E	Paris, Île-de-France	

== Germany ==
Building	Image	Dates	Location	City, Region	Description
Bügeleisenhaus		1611 built 1955 renovated 1962-2021 museum	Haldenplatz; 51°23′51.72″N 7°11′01.21″E	Hattingen, North Rhine-Westphalia	
Chilehaus		1924 completed	Fischertwiete; 53.548°N 10.0016°E	Hamburg (city and state)	
Forum Tower		1999 completed	Potsdamer Platz; 52.509°N 13.375°E	Berlin (city and state)	
Trias-Hochhaus		2014 completed	Martin-Luther-Ring; 51.3375°N 12.3712°E	Leipzig, Saxony	

== Hungary ==
Building	Image	Dates	Location	City, Region	Description
Vasalóház		1913 built	8 Takaréktár Street - 9 Horváth Mihály Street; 46.2551°N 20.1502°E	Szeged, Southern Great Plain	Name is Hungarian for "Flatiron Building". Designed by Lipót Baumhorn (1860–1932)

== Israel ==
Building	Image	Dates	Location	City, Region	Description
Bet Ha'Oniya		1935 built	56 Lavanda Street; 32.05852922498791°N 34.783655571551115°E	Tel Aviv, Tel Aviv District	Built in the International Style. Name is Hebrew for "Ship Building"

== Italy ==
Building	Image	Dates	Location	City, Region	Description
Fetta di Polenta		1840 built	Via Giulia di Barolo, 9; 45.067856746268575°N 7.696959157150555°E	Turin, Piedmont	

== Netherlands ==
Building	Image	Dates	Location	City, Region	Description
Het Strijkijzer		2007	Rijswijkseplein 400; 52.07138°N 4.3241°E	The Hague, South Holland	Name is Dutch for "The Iron"

== New Zealand ==
Building	Image	Dates	Location	City, Region	Description
Auckland Town Hall		1909 built	305 Queen Street; 36.85266004507154°S 174.76341803236087°E	Auckland, Auckland Region	Italian Renaissance Revival, likened to a cheese wedge and flat iron when constructed
Imperial Building, Dunedin		1906 built	1 Dowling Street and 18 Queens Gardens; 45.87705360007242°S 170.50381795314388°E	Dunedin, Otago	Queen Anne Revival, designed by Mason & Wales

== North Macedonia ==
Building	Image	Dates	Location	City, Region	Description
Adora Flatiron		2017	Boris Trajkovski 1; 41.9855689425116°N 21.4381600182876°E	Skopje, North Macedonia	

== Portugal ==
Building	Image	Dates	Location	City, Region	Description
Avenida da Liberdade, 155			Avenida da Liberdade, 155; 38°43′10.56″N 9°08′44.81″W	Lisbon, Lisbon metropolitan area	

== Singapore ==
Building	Image	Dates	Location	Planning Area, Region	Description
The Iveria		2024 completed	2 Kim Yam Road; 1.2952966786477085°N 103.83857827401611°E	River Valley, Central Region	
18 Robinson		2018 completed	18 Robinson Road; 1.2816766197979812°N 103.85053625007261°E	Downtown Core, Central Region	Designed by Kohn Pedersen Fox

== Slovakia ==
Building	Image	Dates	Location	City, Region	Description
Triangolo		2009	Spojovacia 30; 48.30363°N 18.08721°E	Nitra, Nitra Region	Sebastian Nalgy architect

== Slovenia ==
Building	Image	Dates	Location	City, Region	Description
Peglezen		1932-34 built 2009 declared cultural monument of national importance	Poljanska cesta 1; 46.0511°N 14.5111°E	Ljubljana, Central Slovenia Statistical Region	Jože Plečnik and Milan Černigoj, architects. Photo may be seen at sl:Peglezen

== Spain ==
Building	Image	Dates	Location	City, Autonomous community	Description
Casa Antònia Serra i Mas		1926	Carrer de Pere IV; 41.39933°N 2.19504°E	Barcelona, Catalonia	
Banco de Valencia		1935 designed 1942 built	C.del Pintor Sorolla; 39.4705°N 0.3736°W	Valencia, Valencian Community	Valencian neo-baroque
Edificio Metrópolis		1911 opened	Calle de Alcalá; 40.418889°N 3.697222°W	Madrid, Community of Madrid	Beaux-arts design
Edificio Grassy		1917 completed	Gran Via; 40.41907°N 3.69787°W	Madrid, Community of Madrid	

== Sweden ==
Building	Image	Dates	Location	Town / City, County	Description
Flat Iron Building (Stockholm)		2009 built	Norra Bantorget; 59.3359°N 18.0492°E	Stockholm	Designed by Rosenbergs Arkitekter
Daneliuska huset aka Strykjärnshuset (Flatiron building)		1901 built	Birger Jarlsgatan 20; 59.3367°N 18.0719°E	Stockholm	Designed by Erik Josephson

== United Kingdom ==
Building	Image	Dates	Location	Town / City, County	Description
Flat Iron Building (Prescot)	Flat Iron building, Prescot 2	1890 built	72 Eccleston Street; 53°25′47.19″N 2°48′7.22″W	Prescot, Merseyside	Originally built as a warehouse and watchmaking factory as part of Prescot's watchmaking industry.
Imperial Buildings (Liverpool)		1879 built	Victoria Street. 53°24′30.08″N 2°59′1.07″W	Liverpool, Merseyside	Originally used as a bank and later used as offices for Liverpool City Council.
Leeds Bridge House	Leeds Bridge House	1881 built 1996 Grade II Listed building	Hunslet Road. 53°47′35″N 1°32′28″W	Leeds, West Yorkshire	Opened as the 'People's Café'; later a temperance hotel, tea merchant's, dressmaker's, dentist's, manufacturing chemist's, and an office development.
The Peacock, Sunderland	The Peacock, Sunderland	1901-2 built 1978 Grade II Listed building	High Street West. 54°54′24″N 1°23′13″W	Sunderland, Tyne and Wear	At various times a pub, nightclub, and residential accommodation.
Bittles Bar, Belfast	Bittles Bar, Belfast	1868 built	Upper Church Lane. 54.598723°N 5.924291°W	Belfast, County Antrim and County Down	Originally the Shakespeare; renamed 'Bittles Bar' after the owner around 1990. Remainder of the building designed as a flour merchant's warehouse.
The Black Friar, Blackfriars	The Black Friar, Blackfriars	1875 built 1905 and 1917 remodelled 1972 Grade II* Listed building	Queen Victoria Street; 51.512121°N 0.103751°W	Blackfriars, London, Greater London	
Thin House		1887 built	Thurloe Square; 51.49421°N 0.17136°W	Kensington, Greater London	Originally seven artists' studios
Bullnose Building		1876 built 2019 Grade II Listed building	Leeman Road; 53.9596°N 1.0951°W	York, North Yorkshire	Built as the coal manager's office and house, forming part of the North Eastern Railway's York Goods Station. Now part of the National Railway Museum.
Lighthouse Building		c.1875 built 1997 Grade II Listed building 2016 reconstructed	Gray's Inn Road and Pentonville Road; 51.53072°N 0.12178°W	Camden, Greater London	Home of Netten's Oyster Bar and later the Mole Jazz record store.
Globe Point		2022 built	Globe Road; 53.79204°N 1.55255°W	Leeds, West Yorkshire	Advertised as the second flatiron building in Leeds
Island House, Birmingham		1912 built 2012 demolished	Moor Street; 52.4806°N 1.8907°W	Birmingham, West Midlands	
1–7 Constitution Hill, Birmingham		1896 completed 1981 Grade II Listed building	Constitution Hill; 52.486619°N 1.901453°W	Birmingham, West Midlands	
Thrale House (Flat Iron Building), Southwark		late 19th century	44-46 Southwark Street; 51.50504426679574°N 0.09466898187779525°W	Southwark, Greater London	Occupied from 1867 by Wright's Coal Tar Soap
South Eastern Railway Offices		1893 built 2016 demolished	64-84 Tooley Street, 51.50474789025697°N 0.08385507751293324°W	Southwark, Greater London	Demolished to re-develop London Bridge station
The Flat Iron Anfield		1850s built	377 Walton Breck Road; 53.42825275813591°N 2.954440654246572°W	Liverpool, Merseyside	
The Athletic Arms		c.1889 built	1-3 Angle Park Terrace, 55.93901554810787°N 3.2237394191996263°W	Edinburgh, City of Edinburgh Council	
Liverpool, London & Globe Insurance Building		1903 built 1974 Grade II Listed building	1 Albert Square, 53.48016318624905°N 2.245478832765543°W	Manchester, Greater Manchester	
62 Chapel Street, Manchester		c.1900 built 1980 Grade II Listed building	62 Chapel Street, 53.48503673799912°N 2.2489696679172013°W	Manchester, Greater Manchester	Former police station.
Victoria Buildings, Manchester		1874 built 1994 Grade II Listed building	Dantzig Street, 53.48511904405414°N 2.2397076054118337°W	Manchester, Greater Manchester	Originally warehouses and workshops; now converted to flats and a bar/nightclub
Exchange Buildings, Leicester		1888 built 2000 Grade II listed building	50 Rutland Street, 52.63499918794466°N 1.1278275316334654°W	Leicester, East Midlands	Fitted with a French pavilion roof. Formerly a printing press and furniture store; now a bar.
11 King Street, Nottingham		1893 complete 1972 Grade II listed building	11 King Street; 52.954380938702066°N 1.1497020797265332°W	Nottingham, East Midlands	Built in Flemish Renaissance Revival style. Originally the Prudential Assurance buildings; later Clarendon College, a Hard Rock Cafe, a Brazilian restaurant and a cocktail bar.
Bradley House, Manchester		1850s built 1994 Grade II listed building	33 Dale Street; 53.481565058485906°N 2.233150388890341°W	Manchester, Greater Manchester	Originally a shipping warehouse and hat factory. Now a hotel
The Kellstone		2026 to be completed	Aire Park; 53.79264691432922°N 1.5397915727757958°W	Leeds, West Yorkshire	Originally 'the Keystone'.
Bridgeway House		1921 completed 1997 Stockport Heritage Asset.	Mellor Lane; 53.37574479755587°N 2.1885659196139016°E	Cheadle Hulme, Cheshire	Built for Williams Deacon's Bank.

== United States ==
Key

	NHL-designated
	NRHP-listed
^{∞}	Contributing in a NRHP-listed Historic district
	Former building (demolished)

Building	Image	Dates	Location	City, State	Description
Flatiron Flats		1985 built	2 Center St. 36.40252°N 93.73692°W	Eureka Springs, Arkansas	In 1970-listed Eureka Springs Historic District; designed to be compatible with historic streetscape.
Flatiron Building (Novato, California)		1908 built	701 Grant Avenue; 38.1066°N 122.5654°W	Novato, California	Two stories.
Flood Building		1904 built 1982 San Francisco Designated Landmark	870 Market Street; 37.7849°N 122.4074°W	San Francisco, California	One of few buildings of its size that survived the 1906 earthquake. Designed by Albert Pissus.
Columbus Tower, aka the Sentinel Building		1907 built 1970 San Francisco Designated Landmark	916 Kearny Street; 37.7964°N 122.4049°W	San Francisco, California	Designed by Salfield & Kohlberg, developed by Abe Ruef.
Phelan Building		1908 built 1982 San Francisco Designated Landmark	760 Market Street; 37.7866°N 122.4055°W	San Francisco, California	Designed by William Curlett
Fugazi Bank Building aka Old Transamerica Building		1909 built 1973 San Francisco Designated Landmark	4 Columbus Avenue; 37.7958°N 122.4037°W	San Francisco, California	Designed by Charles Paff. Third storey added in 1914.
Flatiron Building (San Francisco, California), 1913		1913 built 1982 San Francisco Designated Landmark	540 Market Street; 37.7900°N 122.4007°W	San Francisco, California	Designed by Havens & Toepke
388 Market Street		1983 built	388 Market Street; 37.7922°N 122.3982°W	San Francisco, California	Designed by Skidmore, Owings and Merrill
Cathedral Building		1914 built 1979 NHRP	1615 Broadway; 37.806194°N 122.270000°W	Oakland, California	Gothic Revival, Designed by Benjamin Geer McDougall.
Flatiron Building (Denver, Colorado)		1916 built demolished after 1976	16th and Broadway	Denver, Colorado	Former building designed by architect J.B. Benedict, across from Brown Palace Hotel which is sometimes mistaken for it.
Carroll Building, aka Flat Iron Building (Norwich, Connecticut)		1887 built 1982 NRHP	9–15 Main St., and 14–20 Water St. 41°31′27.6″N 72°4′46.6″W	Norwich, Connecticut	Romanesque Revival architecture designed by Stephen C. Earle.
Flatiron Building (Auburndale, Florida), aka Triangle Building		1912 built	Bartow & Main	Auburndale, Florida	a bank building
Flatiron Building (Atlanta, Georgia), aka English-American Building		1897 built 1976 NRHP; 1991 Atlanta Landmark Building	84 Peachtree Street NW; 33.7562°N 84.3885°W	Atlanta, Georgia	11 stories, designed by Bradford Gilbert
Morris B. Sachs Building			2800 N. Milwaukee (Milwaukee & Diversey)	Chicago, Illinois	
Flatiron Building (Wicker Park, Chicago, Illinois)		1925 built	Milwaukee Avenue, North Avenue, and Damen Avenue, Wicker Park district of West Town; 41°54′37″N 87°40′37″W	Chicago, Illinois	
The Robey		1929 built	2018 W. North Avenue, at Damen Avenue and Milwaukee Avenue	Chicago, Illinois	
Purdue State Bank		1914 built	210 West State Street; 40.4238°N 86.9077°W	West Lafayette, Indiana	
Flatiron Building (Wichita, Kansas)		1917 built	E. 21st St. and N. Broadway; 37.72240°N 97.33547°W	Wichita, Kansas	a two-story building at 21st Street, with Broadway on one side and a railroad track on the other side; it is 12 feet wide on one end and 65 feet wide on the other end)
Howard Southern Triangle Building		1926 built	833 Howard Ave. (between Howard Ave. and St. Joseph St.); 29.94476°N 90.07425°W	New Orleans, Louisiana	
Hay Building, aka Flatiron Building (Portland, Maine)		1925 built	At Congress Square, between Congress St. and Free St. 43.65426°N 70.26262°W	Portland, Maine	
Maryland Inn		1782 built	Church Circle, between Main St. and Duke of Gloucester St. 38.97818°N 76.49214°W	Annapolis, Maryland	
Flatiron Building (Boston, Massachusetts), aka Bulfinch Hotel			107 Merrimac Street; 42.36393°N 71.06239°W	Boston, Massachusetts	
Flatiron Building (Fall River, Massachusetts)		1908 built	Between 2nd St. and Plymouth Ave. 41.69059°N 71.15908°W	Fall River, Massachusetts	
Parsons Block, aka Flatiron Building				Holyoke, Massachusetts	
I.O.O.F. Centennial Building		1876 built 1903 addition 1979 Michigan State Historic Site; 2015 NRHP	150 E. Chisholm Street; 45°03′40″N 83°25′57″W	Alpena, Michigan	Late Victorian, Italianate designed by William Mirre
Lafayette Building (Detroit, Michigan)		1923 built 2009–2010 demolished	144 West Lafayette Blvd. 42.33143°N 83.04879°W	Detroit, Michigan	
Reid Building		1896 built	162 Cadillac Square; 42.33125235656132°N 83.04372813584442°W	Detroit, Michigan	Romanesque Revival, designed by Donaldson & Meier for Dr. Stanley G. Miner.
The Ashley		1913 built	1538 Centre Street42.336380117316494°N 83.04733680049414°W	Detroit, Michigan	Originally the Henry Clay Hotel, designed by Alvin E. Harley and Norman S. Atcheson. Subsequently, the Milner Hotel; converted to apartments in 2012.
Flatiron Hotel		1912 built 1978 NRHP	1722 St. Mary's Avenue41°15′19.2″N 95°56′22.1″W	Omaha, Nebraska	Georgian Revival
Sawyer Building, aka Flatiron Building (Dover, New Hampshire)		1812 built 1980 NRHP	4-6 Portland St. 43°11′47″N 70°52′19″W	Dover, New Hampshire	Federal architecture
Flatiron Building (Auburn, New York)		1970 NRHP; 1978 delisted	1-3 Genesee St. 42.93307°N 76.56393°W	Auburn, New York	This building was on the list of National Register of Historic Places in Cayuga County, but was demolished in 1975.
Flat Iron Building (Goshen, New York)		1906 or before built	25 Main St.	Goshen, New York	
47 Plaza Street West		1928 built	47–61 Plaza Street West (at Grand Army Plaza), Park Slope; 40.673234°N 73.971441°W	Brooklyn, New York City	16-floor Venetian Gothic design by Rosario Candela
Flatiron Building, aka Fuller Building		1902 built 1966 NYC Landmark; 1979 NRHP; 1989 NHL	Fifth Ave. 40°44′28″N 73°59′23″W	New York, New York	Designed by Daniel Burnham in Renaissance Revival style.
Flat Iron Building (Asheville, North Carolina)		1925 built 1979 NRHP CP	Battery Park Avenue; 35.5950°N 82.5552°W	Asheville, North Carolina	Beaux-Arts in style, part of Downtown Asheville Historic District
Flatiron Building (Grand Forks, North Dakota)		1906 built 1982 NRHP; 2006 delisted	323 Kittson Ave. 47°55′25.3″N 97°1′47.2″W	Grand Forks, North Dakota	Destroyed in 1997 Red River flood.
Flatiron Building (Akron, Ohio)		1907 built		Akron, Ohio	
H.A. Higgins Building, aka Flatiron Building (Columbus, Ohio)		1914 built 1979 NRHP; 1984 Columbus Register of Historic Places	129 E. Nationwide Blvd. 39.968774°N 82.998062°W	Columbus, Ohio	Designed by Herbert Aloysius Higgins
Flatiron Building (Portland, Oregon)		1916 built 1989 NRHP; 2010 Portland Historic Landmark	1223–1225 SW Stark Street; 45.522834°N 122.683696°W	Portland, Oregon	
Portland Flatiron Building (2018)		2018 built	N. Cook St. 45.54673°N 122.67592°W	Portland, Oregon	A mixed-use building designed by Works Progress Architecture that utilizes CLT to accommodate for the significant grade change on site. (Note: Photo may not be available as copyrighted work of art.)
Flatiron Building, aka Wilbur Trust Building			40.61023°N 75.38323°W	Bethlehem, Pennsylvania	
Rufus Barrett Stone House, aka Flatiron Building (Bradford, Pennsylvania)		1903 built 1982 NRHP	11 Boylston Street; 41°57′25.5″N 78°38′59.5″W	Bradford, Pennsylvania	
Flatiron Building (Brownsville, Pennsylvania)		1830 built	69 Market Street; 40.02257°N 79.88582°W	Brownsville, Pennsylvania	Now the Flatiron Building Heritage Center
Flatiron Building (Pittston, Pennsylvania)		1906 built		Pittston, Pennsylvania	
Flatiron Hotel, Wilkes-Barre, Pennsylvania		1906 Built	Corners of South Main, Ross and Hazle Streets	Wilkes-Barre, Pennsylvania	
Pete's Clothing/ Hodge Bootery Flat iron Building		1903 built	Between State Street and Railroad Street, at U.S. Route 85 CanAm Highway; 44.67130°N 103.85333°W	Belle Fourche, South Dakota	
Raven Industries headquarters		1946 built	On 6th St. east of Phillips Avenue	Sioux Falls, South Dakota	Building is an extension of the Manchester Biscuit Co. building immediately east. Raven Industries purchased the building in 1960.
Flatiron Building (Chattanooga, Tennessee)		1911 built	Between Walnut St. and Georgia Ave. 35.04799°N 85.30725°W	Chattanooga, Tennessee	
Flatiron Building (Fort Worth, Texas)		1907 built 1971 NRHP	1000 Houston St. 32°45′1″N 97°19′46″W	Fort Worth, Texas	
Flatiron Building (Bellingham, Washington)		1908 built 1983 NRHP	1311–1319 Bay St. 48.75171°N 122.48076°W	Bellingham, Washington	
Pullman Flatiron Building		1905 built	E. Main St. & S. Grand Ave. 46.72955°N 117.18182°W	Pullman, Washington	
Flat Iron Building (Welch, West Virginia)		1915 built 1992 NRHP CP	73 McDowell; 37.43214°N 81.58567°W	Welch, West Virginia	
Emily Morgan Hotel (San Antonio)		1924 built 2012 National Trust for Historic Preservation	705 E Houston St. 29.42658°N 98.48575°W	San Antonio, Texas	
Times Square Building	[[File:Times_Square_Building%2C_Seattle.jpg/125px]]	1916 built	414 Olive Way; 47.61255°N 122.33808°W	Seattle, Washington	
Joshua Sears Building		1891 built 1982 NRHP	737 Market St. 47.68074°N 122.20981°W	Kirkland, Washington	Beaux Arts, Romanesque Revival, architect unknown
Turk's Head Building		1913	Westminster and Weybosset Streets, 41°49′28.42″N 71°24′35.5″W	Providence, Rhode Island	
56 Beaver Street		1891	56 Beaver Street; 40.70505172°N 74.0102781°W	New York, New York	Part of the Wall Street Historic District
Western Auto Building		1914 built 1988 NRHP	2107 Grand Boulevard, 39°5′16″N 94°34′52″W	Kansas City, Missouri	Designed in the commercial style by Arthur C. Tufts & Co. for the Coca-Cola Company

== See also ==
- Flatiron (disambiguation)
- Flatiron District, Manhattan
