= Flatiron =

Flatiron or flat iron may refer to:

== Objects ==
- Clothes iron
- Hair iron

== Places ==
- Flatiron Building, New York City, at the intersection of 5th & Broadway
  - Flatiron District, New York City, named after the Flatiron Building
- List of Flatiron buildings, including many similar buildings
- Flatirons Community Church, a large non-denominational church in Lafayette, Colorado

== Geology ==
- Flatiron (geomorphology), a steeply sloping wedge shaped landscape feature
  - Flatirons, rock formations near Boulder, Colorado
  - Flatiron (volcano), a volcano in Wells Gray Park, British Columbia, Canada
  - The Flatiron, a headland overlooking Granite Harbour, Victoria Land, Antarctica

== Other uses ==
- Flat Iron (restaurant), British steak restaurant chain
- The Flatiron (photograph), a 1904 photograph by Edward Steichen
- Flatiron Books, a division of Macmillan Publishers
- Flat Iron (lacrosse), First Nations lacrosse player who competed in the 1904 Summer Olympics for Canada
- Flat-iron gunboat, a 19th-century iron gunboat typified by a single large gun fitted in the bow
- Flatiron (ship), a type of British ship for passing under low bridges
- Flat iron steak, a cut of beef
- Flatiron Dragados, a civil infrastructure construction firm
