= Ledo Hotel =

Historic hotel in Sudbury, Ontario, Canada

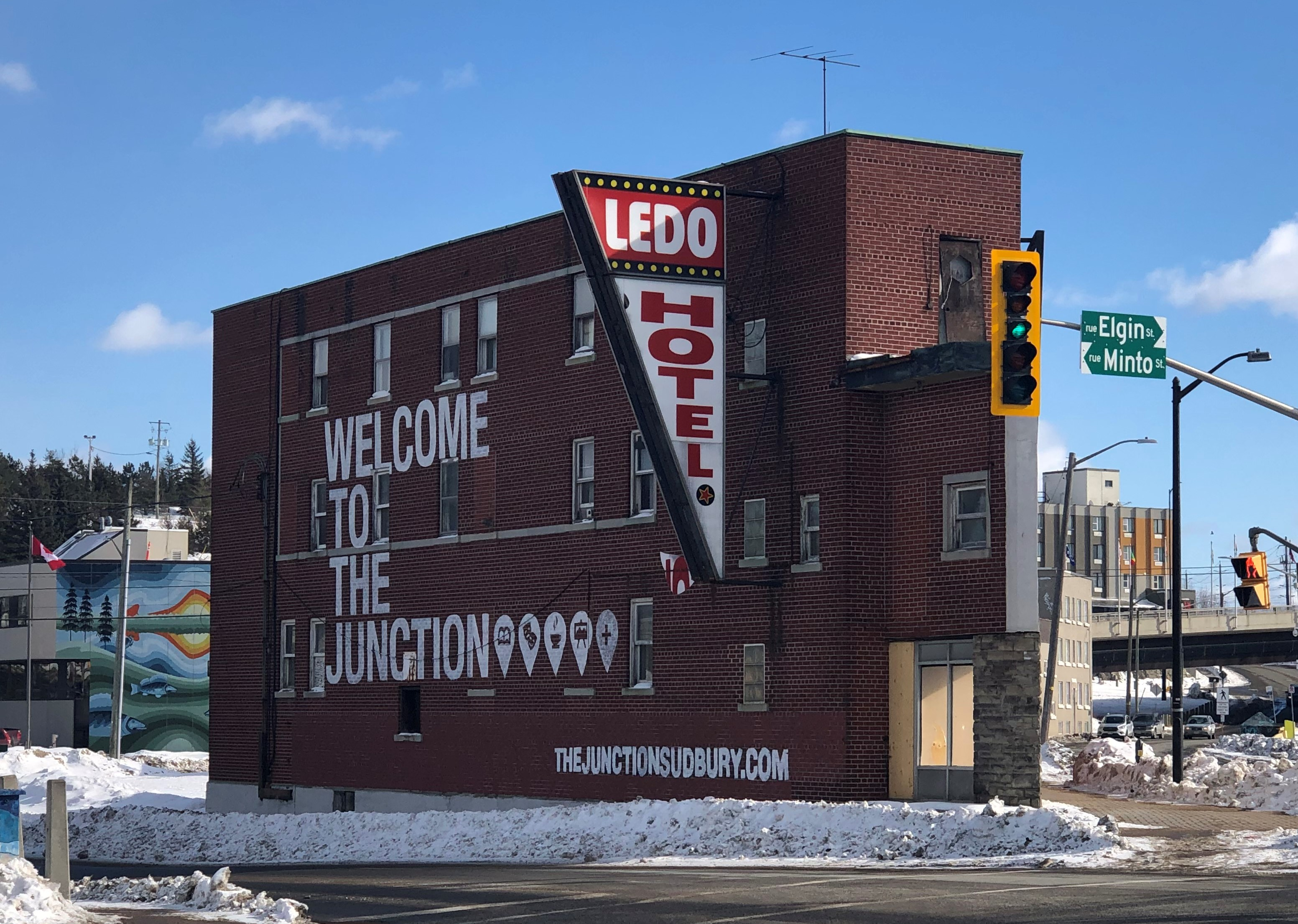
- Interactive map of the Ledo Hotel area

General information
- Status: Demolished
- Type: Hotel
- Location: Downtown Sudbury, 300 Elgin Street; Sudbury, Ontario; P3E 3N8
- Coordinates: 46.4876°N 80.9914°W
- Completed: 1955
- Demolished: 2024

The Ledo Hotel was a three-storey brick building located in downtown Sudbury, Ontario, Canada. Originally built as a commercial block in 1907, the building has also served as a hotel as well as contained apartment suites. The project sits on a high traffic site, triangulated between Van Horne, Elgin and Shaughnessy Street. It was located in downtown Sudbury, named as such due to the concentration of restaurants, entertainment, local craft stores and tattoo parlors as well as the Place des Arts. The original building was destroyed by a fire in 1952 and a new building built on the same footprint, known as the Ledo seen today. The building has become increasingly unsafe until being deemed too dangerous for human occupation by the Sudbury Fire Marshal in October 2020, and now exists as a vacant structure. Multiple proposals to reuse the building for further development in recent years were considered, but the Sudbury City Council voted to demolish the building for parking space, with demolition awaiting to be started. Demolition began January 8th, 2024.

== History ==
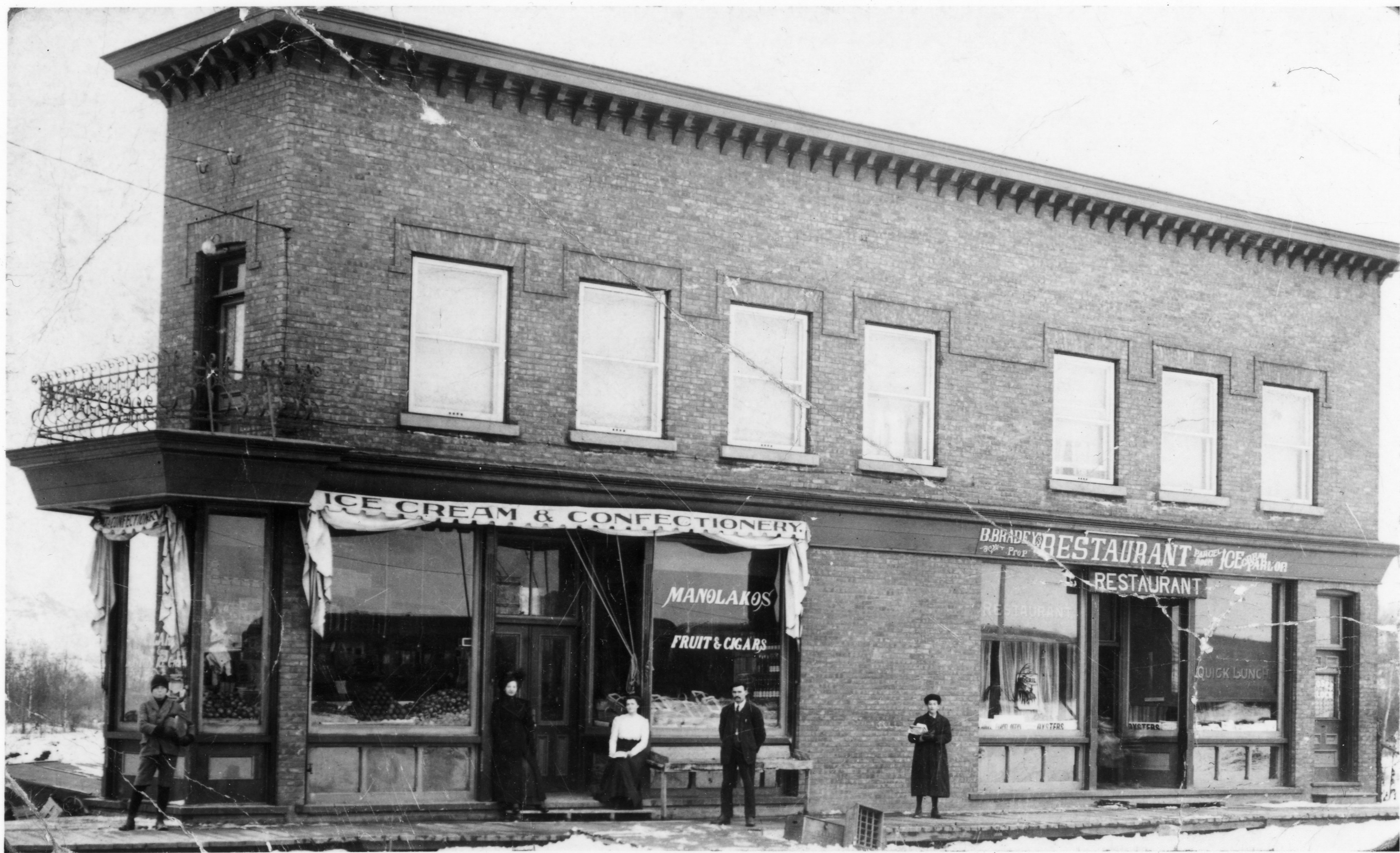
Original building located at Elgin and Van Horne

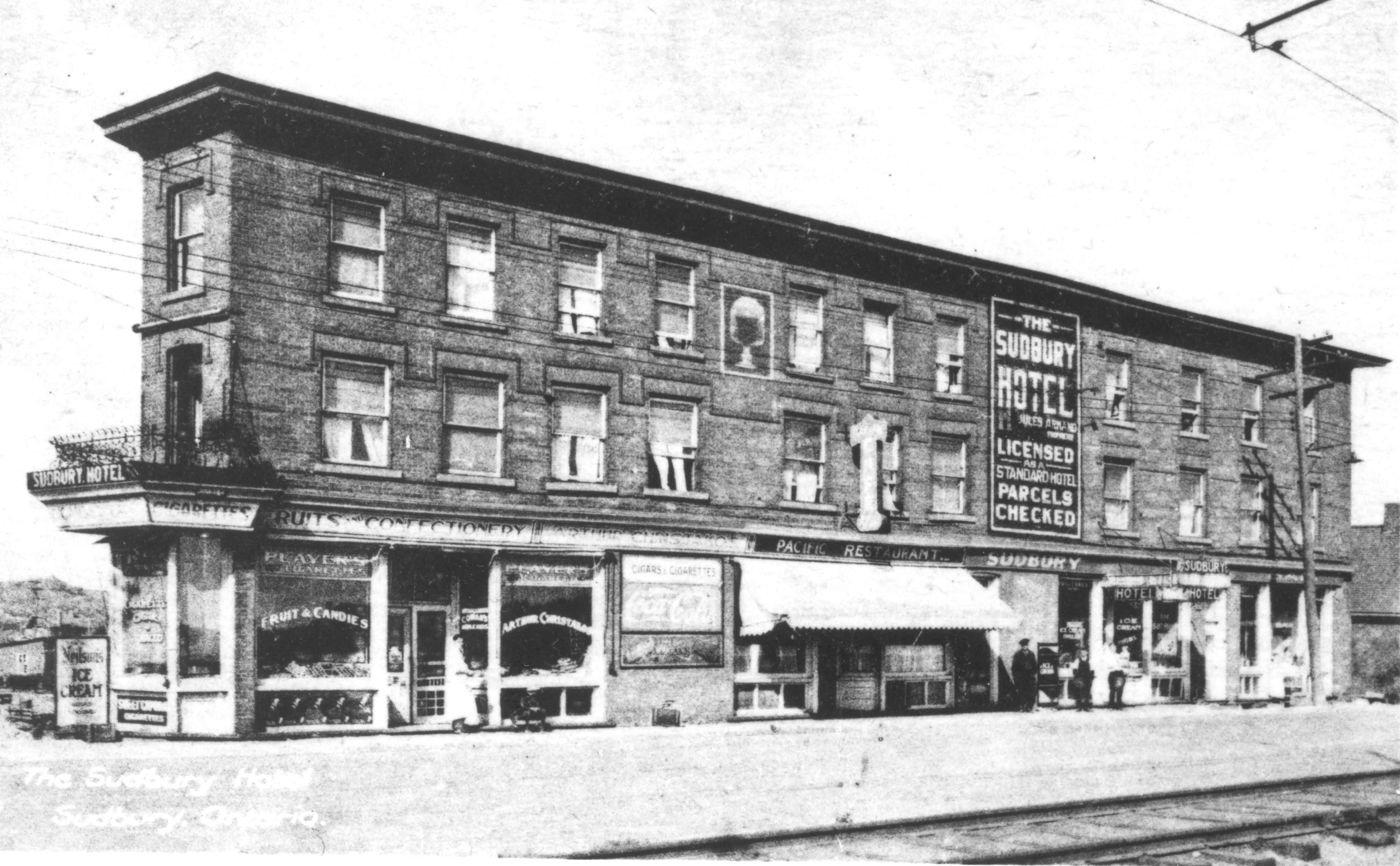
The Sudbury Hotel, after the expansion of the original building

The original 2-storey, flat-iron building was constructed in 1910 by P. Manolakos, a Greek resident in the Sudbury community. As a result of large-scale mining in the 1900s, Sudbury saw an increase of people coming through town on the railways. The building was erected across from the old CPR train station, now the Sudbury station, housing an Ice Cream and Confectionery store as well as a restaurant for locals as well as travelers. The second storey held residential units for the business owners.

=== Project development ===
The building was expanded in 1914, allowing for more businesses on the first storey as well as hotel suites on the second storey. A third storey was also added to allow for greater capacity in the hotel. It was at this time that the building was named the Sudbury Hotel, providing accommodations for travelers. The first storey now housed a lobby for the hotel as well as the other businesses, including the addition of a taxi service. The building was purchased in 1930 by Hascal Moses, a Jewish immigrant from Romania, who also owned the Moses Block in downtown Sudbury, a smaller flat-iron building. Moses sold the building upon his retirement in 1949. A fire destroyed the building in the winter of 1952, at which time the current Ledo Hotel was built, matching the footprint of the former Sudbury Hotel.

=== Current building ===
The current Ledo building functioned as a hotel for over 50 years, accommodating guests and tourist through the end of the 1900s. The Ledo, as well as the adjacent sites (Ledo Block), was then purchased in 2007 by George Soule, a Sudbury landlord, who operated the Ledo Hotel as a rooming house that was rented out on a monthly basis. The Ledo currently has 27 rooms across the second and third storeys, while the first acts as rentable storage for local businesses.

== Current condition ==
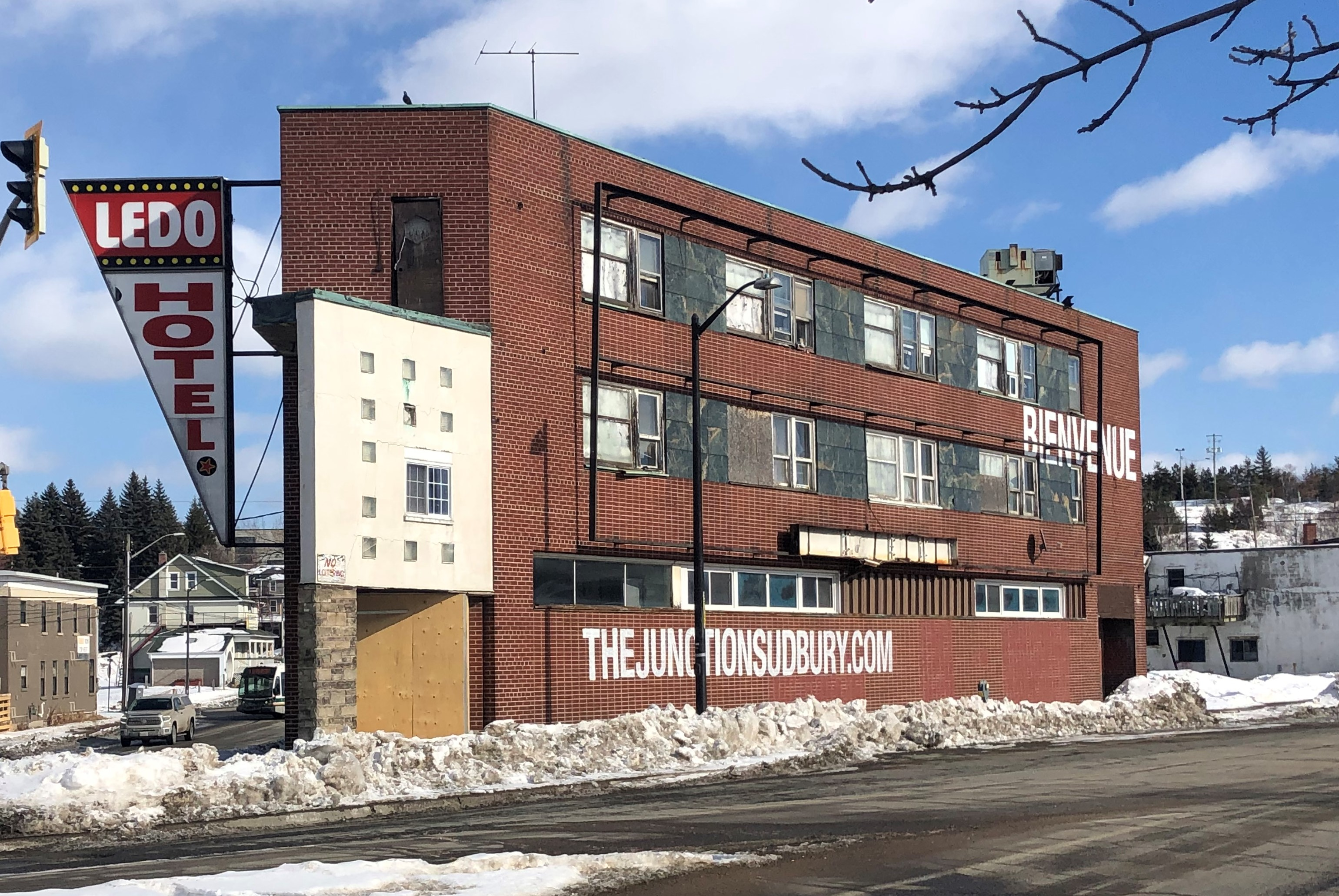
Ledo Hotel depicted while vacant

The landlord has reported many issues with the building, including aging of the building as well as people breaking in for a free place to stay. Damages include water leakage from the roof as well as broken windows and pried open doors on the ground floor. Due to a low amount of paying tenants, Soule has struggled to maintain the building, which has left the building in disrepair. On October 25, 2020, a fire was reported in one of the units. While no one was injured, thirteen residents were displaced to temporary locations. The Sudbury Fire Department deemed the building an “immediate threat to life” due to leakage and electrical concerns. Sudbury Hydro has disconnected the power to the Ledo, which presently sits vacant. Soule was willing to sell the Ledo Block from 2011 to 2023, being listed at $1.25 million. On June 13, 2023, the Sudbury City Council successfully voted to buy the land and the building for $900,000 and raze the land to make space for public parking development. On July 13, the City Council announced that they would buy the rest of the triangular block that The Ledo sat on. The Ledo is currently awaiting for who wins the bid on demolishing the building.

=== Downtown Sudbury rejuvenation ===
There have been multiple developments in downtown Sudbury in the past decade, including the McEwen School of Architecture as well as the Place Des Arts. These are part of a rejuvenation project in the downtown core of Sudbury, aiming to attract individuals to the once largely active center of Sudbury. The Elgin Street Greenway is a proposed development in which Elgin Street, running alongside the rail lines, is regreened in an effort to create a multi-use pathway that buffers the rail lines from the downtown. The Ledo Block is located along the Greenway, making the site attractive to developers.

== Proposed developments ==
=== McEwen School of Architecture ===
The McEwen School of Architecture, belonging to Laurentian University, is located in the downtown core of Sudbury. Completed in 2013, the project sits at 85 Elm Street, though community members formed a Best Option committee that proposed the project be located on the Ledo Block. The current location of the architecture school displaced the local farmers market, and there were various other proposals that allowed for the farmers market to remain untouched. Disadvantages to the current site were highlighted by community members, including proximity to the rail lines, relocation of the market as well as a loss of heavily used parking spaces. The Ledo Block, however, would not remove as much parking, it would allow the school to sit further from the rail lines and would be located in the “arts district” of the downtown core. This proposal acknowledged the existing buildings, stating that they could either be incorporated in an adaptive reuse or removed before construction began. Laurentian University's chief of staff at the time, Chris Mercer, stated that the architecture school requires more space than the Ledo Block offered. The development at the Ledo Block, according to the Best Option committee, also allowed for the addition of a student residence in close proximity to the school. Laurentian University currently does not have a student residence in proximity to the architecture school. Soule, the property owner, declared an interest to sell the property to the city for such a development.

=== Speculative development ===
A thesis project from McEwen architecture student, Christopher Baziw, Home: Sudbury is a proposal to begin to resolve the challenge of homelessness in Sudbury. The thesis culminates in a proposed development at the Ledo Hotel that provides affordable housing for the vulnerable community as well as various services that can aid with rehabilitation from homelessness. Similar to the McEwen School of Architecture proposal, Baziw's thesis proposal inhabits the entire Ledo Block, acting as an addition to the existing Ledo Hotel building.

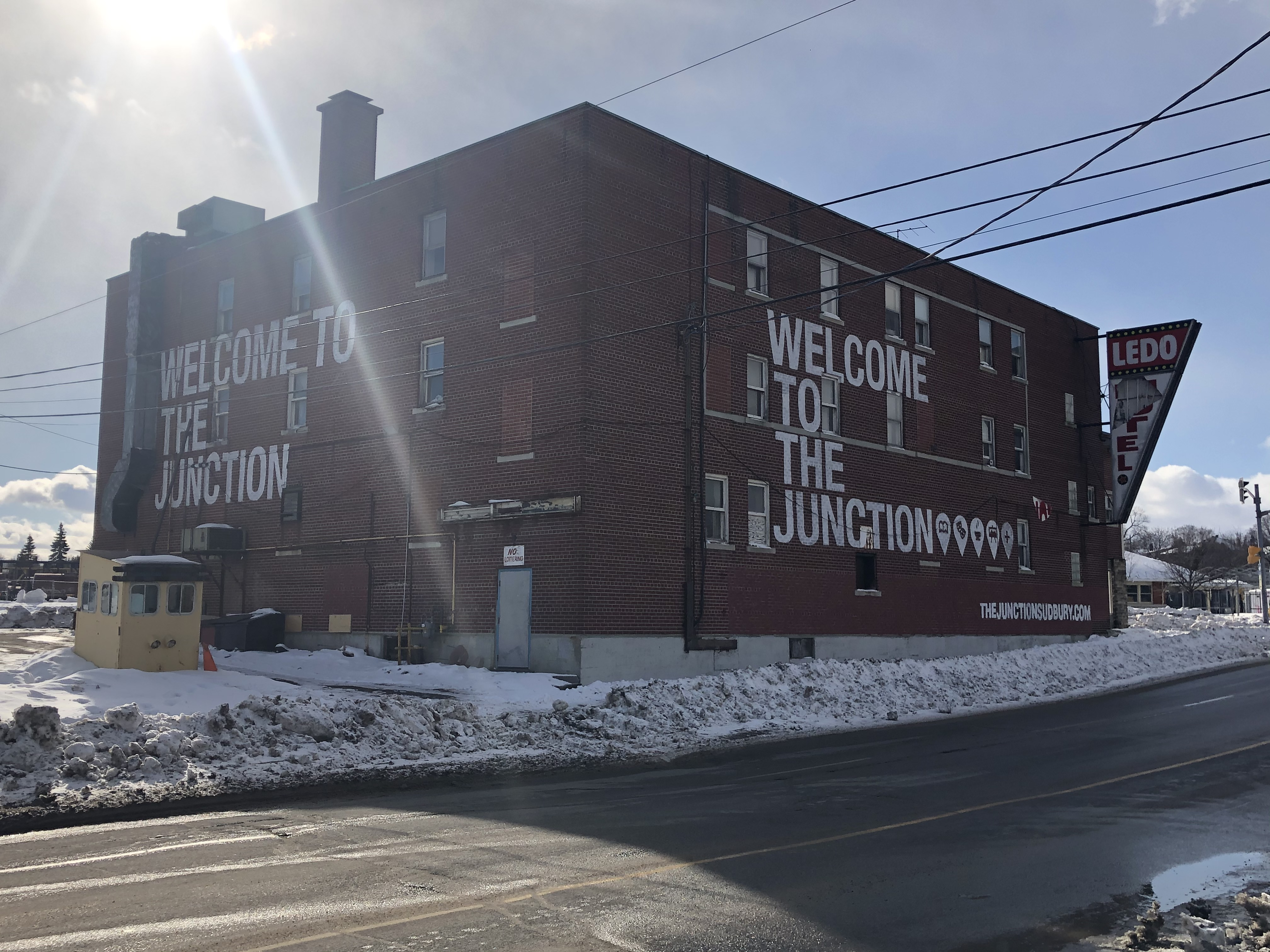
Mural on the Ledo Hotel

=== Le Ledo Inc. development ===
A proposed development from a private-sector Sudbury group named Le Ledo Inc. which sees the Ledo reimagined as a 150,000 sq ft (14,000 m^{2}) mixed-use commercial facility. The envisioned project is an adaptive reuse of the Ledo Hotel, with the addition of a 14-storey tower to be used as either a hotel or for residential purposes. The group is fronted by spokesperson Chris Tammi, a Sudbury real-estate broker, who has stated the intent of the project is to aid in the revitalization of the downtown core. Tammi sees the project to be a seamless addition to the City of Greater Sudbury's Downtown Master Plan, which includes the Elgin street Greenway. The project is still waiting on municipal approvals, but will adhere to uses allowed within C-6 commercial zoning.

A mural was added to the building in early October 2020. The mural reads 'Welcome to the Junction' and bears a website below. The website depicts various proposed projects in the Junction area of downtown Sudbury, including the Elgin Greenway project, the Sudbury Library and Art Gallery as well as the proposed development for the Ledo Hotel by Le Lido Inc.
