= Sawyer Building =

- U.S. National Register of Historic Places
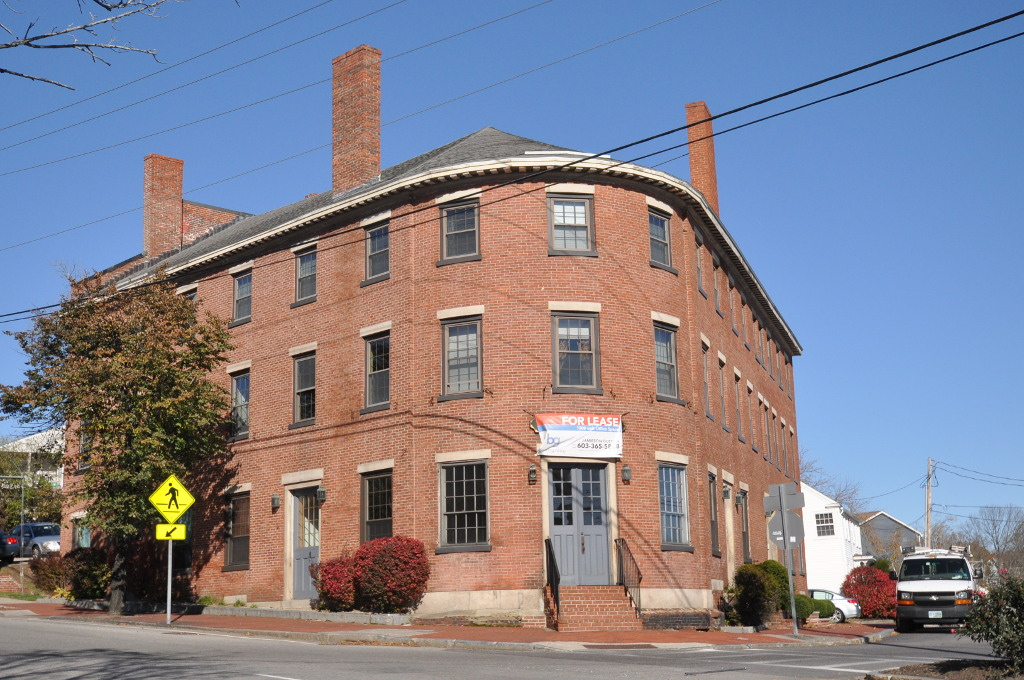

- Location within New Hampshire Location within the United States
- Location: 4-6 Portland St., Dover, New Hampshire
- Coordinates: 43°11′47″N 70°52′19″W
- Area: 0.2 acres (0.081 ha)
- Built: 1812
- Architectural style: Federal
- NRHP reference No.: 80000316
- Added to NRHP: May 23, 1980

The Sawyer Building is a historic commercial building at 4-6 Portland Street in Dover, New Hampshire. The three-story brick structure was built in 1825, during Dover's period of economic prosperity following the establishment of its textile mills. It is one of Dover's oldest commercial buildings. The building was listed on the National Register of Historic Places in 1980.

== Description and history ==
The Sawyer Building occupies a prominent triangular lot bounded by Portland Avenue and Main Street in downtown Dover, and is also known locally as the Flatiron Building, after the triangular Flatiron Building in New York City. It is three stories in height, built out of brick and set on a granite foundation. Its street-facing facade is curved at the street corner, and extends for a total of seventeen bays, five of which have entrances. The entrances are framed in granite, and windows have granite lintels. It is covered by a low-pitch hipped roof.

The building was erected in 1825, during Dover's early boom period as a cotton textile manufacturing center. Its location, known then as the Landing, was the commercial trading hub for the city's maritime cotton trade, which was one of the most extensive in the country in 1830. It is one of Dover's oldest surviving commercial buildings, and an excellent example of commercial Federal period architecture.

During the early 20th century, Platt’s Block housed Raoul Roux’s family-owned grocery and provision store at the corner of Main and Portland Streets. In December, Raoul suffered serious burns when an oil stove exploded and started a fire in the store. Although he was initially thought to be recovering, his injuries worsened, and he died at Wentworth Hospital. According to his obituary in Foster’s Daily Democrat, Roux had lived in Dover for approximately 30 years and was also a successful stock farmer, keeping registered cattle on a farm on Sixth Street.

== See also ==
- List of flatiron buildings
- National Register of Historic Places listings in Strafford County, New Hampshire
