= Flatiron Building (Novato, California) =

Novato Flatiron Building
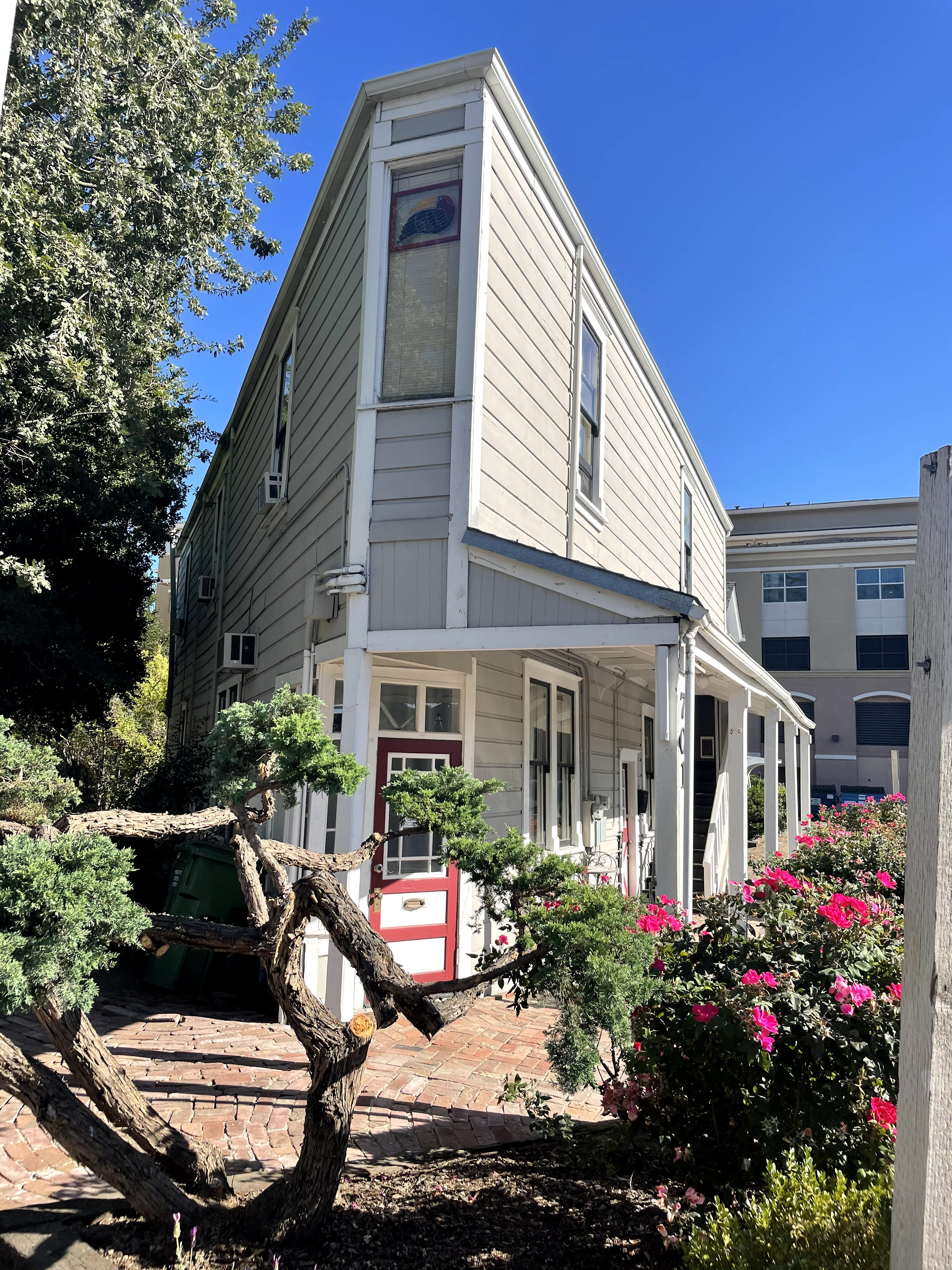
- Alternative names: Yelmorini Building

General information
- Address: 701 Grant Avenue
- Town or city: Novato
- Country: United States
- Coordinates: 38.1066°N 122.5654°W
- Completed: 1908

Technical details
- Floor count: 2

The Flatiron Building is a historic building in the "Old Town" of Novato, California. Built in 1908 by Abraham Yelmorini, a Swiss immigrant and dairy farmer, who also operated a saloon behind it. It was designed to attract the attention of passengers arriving at the nearby Novato train station and prevent them from seeing the other saloons in town. After Mr. Yelmorini's saloon ceased operations, a Wells Fargo express office opened in its place. Below street level are several black doors, for purposes unknown. It served as offices of the local newspaper, the Marin County Banner, and in 1922, for the Novato Advance. In 1918, it housed a market; in 1958, a thrift shop; in 2007, a gift shop; a home furnishings store; and in 2012, a bookshop.

== See also ==
- List of buildings named Flatiron Building
