= Flatiron Building (Bellingham, Washington) =

Coordinates: 48.7517°N 122.4807°W

- Flatiron Building or Hamilton Building
- U.S. National Register of Historic Places
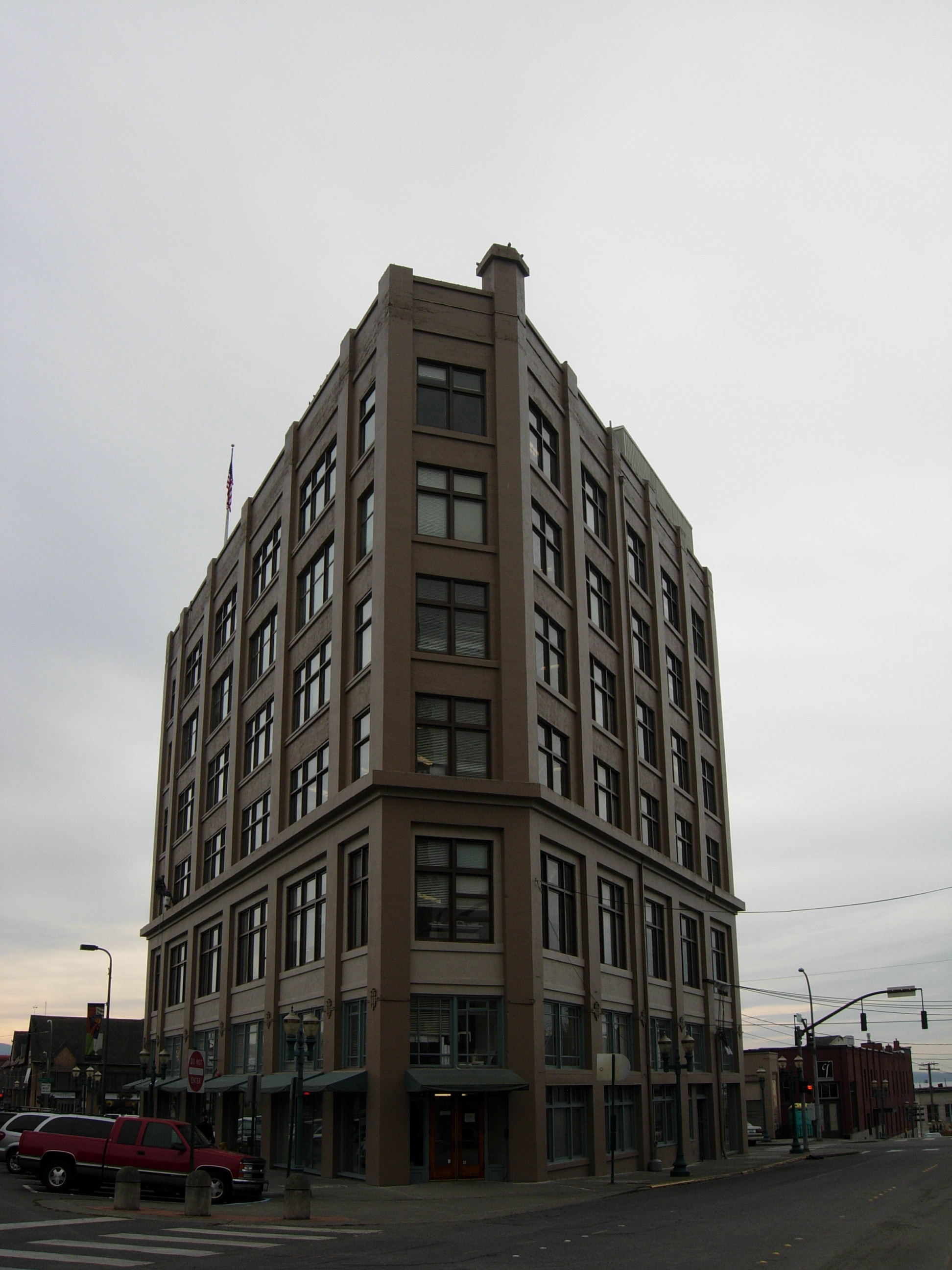
- Location: Bellingham, Washington
- Built: 1907-1908
- Architect: Frank C. Burns
- Architectural style: Chicago school
- NRHP reference No.: 83003358
- Added to NRHP: January 27, 1983

The Hamilton Building also known as The Flatiron Building of Bellingham and the Bellingham Bay Furniture Building was considered the first "skyscraper" in Bellingham, Washington. Built in 1908 for Talifero Simpson Hamilton's growing Bellingham Bay (B.B.) Furniture Company established in 1889, the building cost $100,000 and used thirty-five thousand barrels of cement along with 200,000 pounds of steel. Due to its triangular shape and resemblance to the Fuller Building in New York, the building instantly garnered the flatiron nickname. It was Bellingham's tallest structure until 1926.

== Construction ==
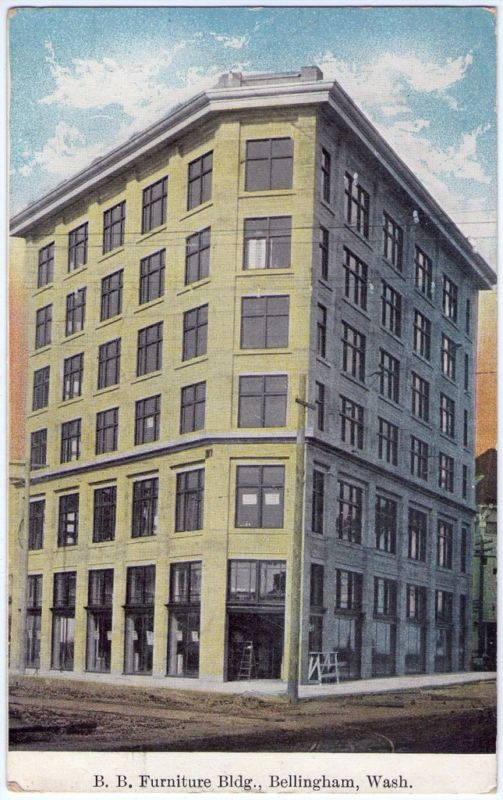
Bellingham Bay Furniture Building

In late 1906, the Bellingham Bay Improvement Company hired Seattle architect James C. Teague (later designer of the nearby Exchange [YMCA] and Dahlquist buildings) to draw preliminary plans for a five-story building that would fill their triangular block bound by Champion, Prospect and Bay Streets in downtown Bellingham, a very prime location. It would be a concrete frame building clad in brick with stone at the base. In the original plans, the building would house possibly a bank or other small stores with office space and lodge rooms above but because of litigation involving the property and the construction of a temporary skating rink on the site, it was speculated that the building would not be built very soon.

In April 1907, the Bellingham Herald announced that the Bellingham Bay Furniture Company, owned by T.S. Hamilton, had purchased the block for $15,000 cash and were rushing plans for the construction of the city's first skyscraper. Soon after the purchase, they dropped Teague's design in favor of one drawn by local architect Frank C. Burns. These plans were for a largely unadorned seven-story building of all reinforced concrete crowned with false chimneys and a large wooden cornice (now gone). To maximize floor space, large pivoting windows would cover all sides of the building, eliminating the need for a lightwell in the middle of the building. Two elevators, one for passengers and one for freight were included in the plans. Despite the buildings' size, it would actually only be 4,000 square feet (370 m^{2}) larger than the company's previous quarters at Holly and Bay Streets.

Bids were let for the Flatiron building, at the time known as the Hamilton Block, in June 1907. Booker & Campbell won the bid for general construction while Baumaster would handle woodworking. The contract specified that the first six stories were to be completed by January 1, 1908, with a seventh floor to be added later. The structure of the building was to be built sturdy enough to support another four floors if ever needed. Construction was almost brought to a halt by the Panic of 1907, which caused the delay of many construction projects in Bellingham and pushed construction of the building past the January 1 deadline. Contractors rushed to finish the building, canceling plans for any additional floors. The building formally opened to the public in May 1908.

== Fire ==
On the evening of April 28, 1924, a large fire broke out on the top floor and vented through the roof. However, due to the building's design of concrete and reinforced steel, the structure remained intact. Since 90% of the damage was covered by insurance, reconstruction of the building began shortly afterwards. During reconstruction, Hamilton operated the furniture store across the street, partially under a circus tent. The rebuilding took three years and as a precaution to future fire, an automatic sprinkler system with a rooftop tank was installed, the first of its kind in Bellingham. Another precautionary measure against fire was the relocating of the passenger elevator, the original fire's outlet, to a wall against the freight elevator so it could be contained easier. Another major change after the fire was that the second floor mezzanine was rebuilt as a full second story. When the building reopened, it had become seven stories tall without adding to its overall height.

== Current ==
The Bellingham Bay Furniture Company, later known as Van's BB Furniture, occupied the building until closing in 1979. It was unoccupied and owned by the City of Bellingham when it was added to the National Register of Historic Places on January 27, 1983.

The building received a major remodeling by Christenson Engineering in 1990, and served as the company's headquarters. Christenson was sold to VECO Corporation in 1993, and then VECO was sold to CH2M Hill in 2007.

On April 1, 2010, Logos Bible Software signed a long-term lease for the building, which commenced after CH2M Hill's lease expired on August 31, 2010.

On Sept 2, 2025 PLACE moved its headquarters to the building. PLACE is the all-in-one real estate services and technology platform for brokerages.

== See also ==
- List of buildings named Flatiron Building
