= Eureka Springs Historic District =

Historic district in Arkansas, United States

- U.S. National Register of Historic Places
- U.S. Historic district
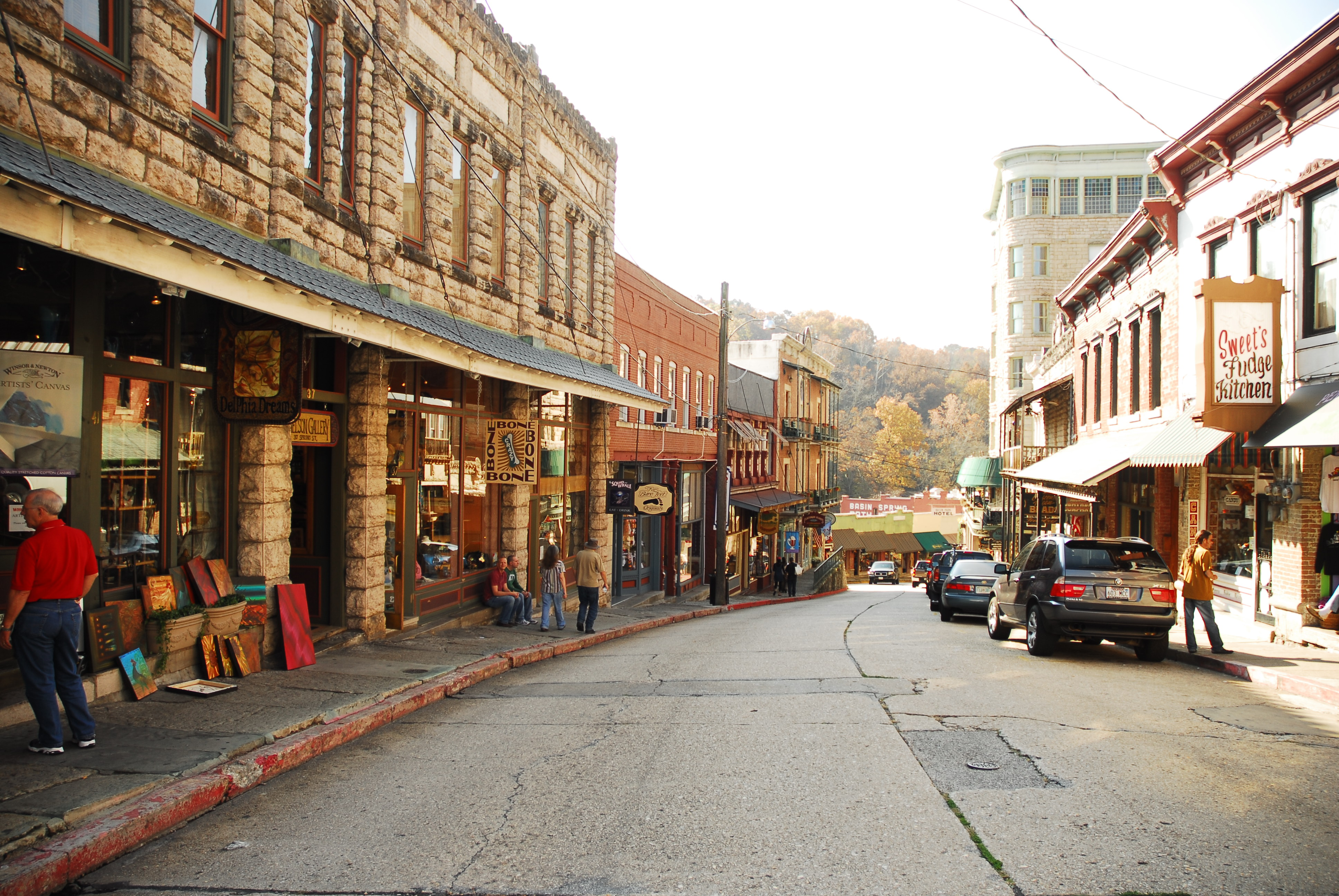
- Spring Street in the district

- Location within Arkansas Location within the United States
- Location: Most of Eureka Springs and its environs, Eureka Springs, Arkansas
- Coordinates: 36°24′6″N 93°44′18″W
- Area: 1,250 acres (510 ha)
- Architectural style: Late Victorian, Late 19th and 20th Century Revivals, Bungalow (original)
- NRHP reference No.: 70000118 (original); 79003730 (increase)

Significant dates
- Added to NRHP: December 18, 1970
- Boundary increase: January 29, 1979

The Eureka Springs Historic District is a historic district that was listed on the National Register of Historic Places in 1970. Its boundaries are those of the city of Eureka Springs, Arkansas at the time of its listing, specifically augmented in 1979 to include its historic railroad depot. Much of the city was developed between 1880 (when several fires swept through) and 1910, when the area was the center of resort activity taking advantage of the many natural springs in the area. About 20% of the city's buildings were built in the 1890s and have a significant element of either Queen Anne or Second Empire styling, while its commercial buildings tend to have Romanesque and Italianate details. The city is one of the best-preserved turn-of-the-century resort communities in the region.

The district was expanded to include the Eureka Springs Railroad Depot.

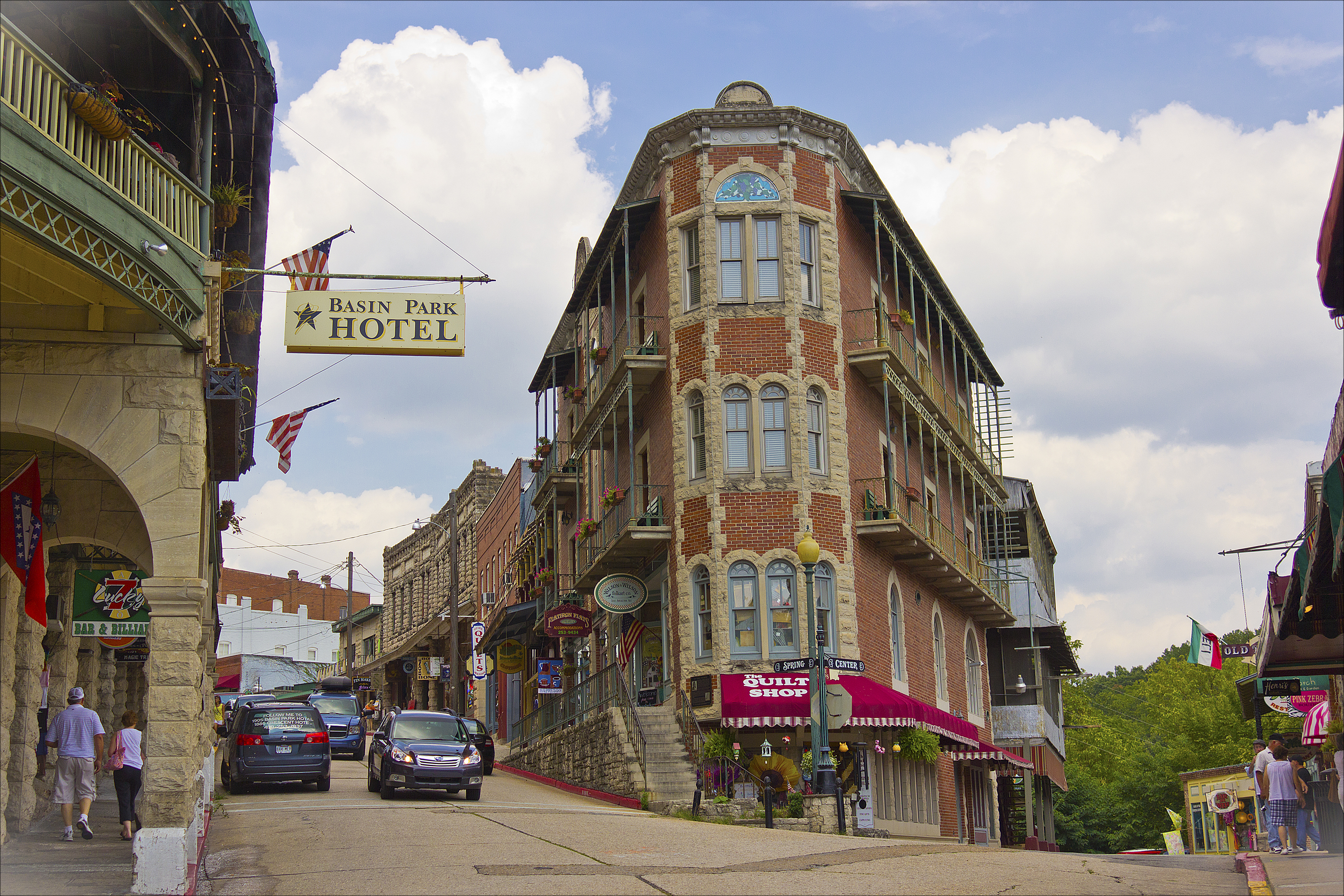
Flatiron Flats

It includes Flatiron Flats, a flatiron building at 2 Center St., which was built in 1985: "Care was taken to create the general shape and style of the original building located at this highly visible downtown comer at Spring and Center Streets."

== See also ==
- National Register of Historic Places listings in Carroll County, Arkansas
