= William Weller =

William Wellar
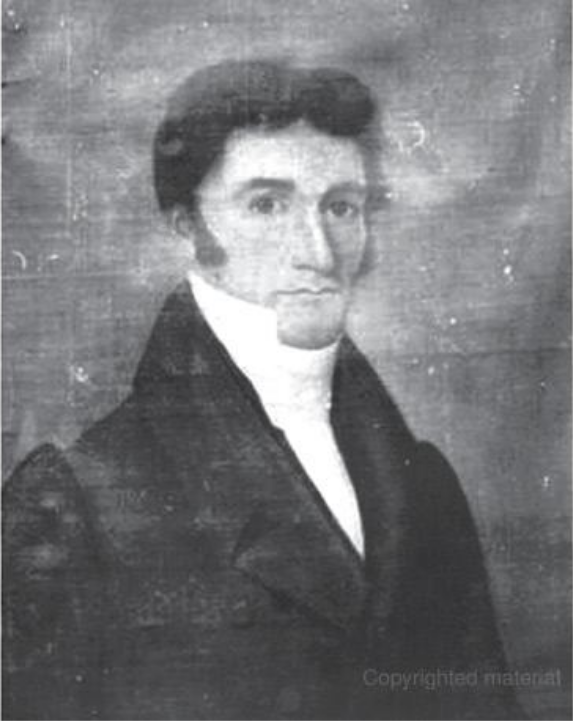
- William Weller in 1835
- Born: May 13, 1799; Vermont
- Died: September 21, 1863 (aged 64)
- Known for: Provincial official

William Weller (May 13, 1799 – September 21, 1863) was an entrepreneur and official in Upper Canada and Canada West. He served three terms as mayor of Cobourg.

He was born in Vermont and came to Upper Canada with his father. With Hiram Norton, in 1829, he purchased a stage coach line running between York (later Toronto) and Kingston, becoming sole owner in 1830. Weller made arrangements with other operators including his former partner to provide connecting service to Montreal. In 1835, he expanded to offer service in winter from Toronto to Hamilton and Niagara and also opened a stage line connecting to Peterborough. He transported mail as well as passengers. Weller also helped support the Cobourg & Peterborough Railroad which, however, was eventually closed in 1860.

He served as a member of the Board of Police for Cobourg from 1837 to 1844 and in 1847. He was also a shareholder in a number of companies involved in road upkeep. Weller was mayor of Cobourg in 1850, 1851 and 1863 and also served five years as a member of the town council.

He married Mercy Willcox and then Margaret McKechin after her death and is thought to have had 22 children. His youngest son, John Laing Weller, was an engineer involved in the construction of the Welland Canal.

Weller's office in Toronto was housed in the Coffin Block Building.
