= Coffin Block Building =

Building in Toronto, Ontario, Canada

Coordinates: 43.64836°N 79.37432°W

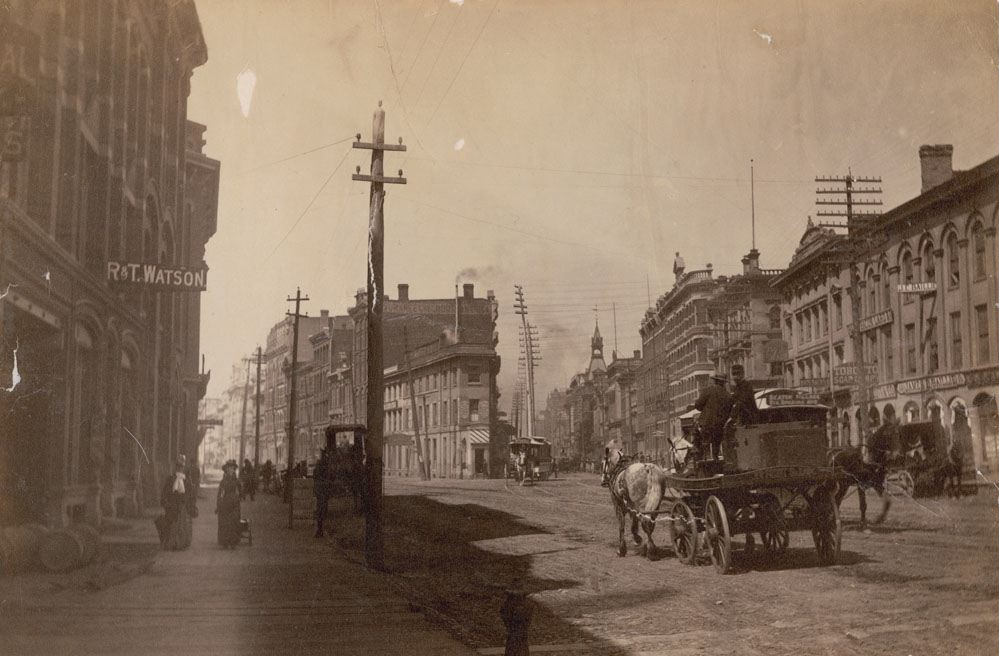
Photo of the Coffin Block by F. W. Micklethwaite, circa 1885

The Coffin Block Building at Front and Church streets was the first flatiron building in Toronto, Ontario, Canada.

The 3-storey Georgian structure was built some time before 1838 (based on a Bartlett print of the building drawn in 1838) and in 1845 became an annex to The Wellington hotel on Church Street.

The basement housed the office of the William Weller (of Cobourg) Stagecoach Company from 1830 to 1835. William Weller operated the east/west stagecoach line operating from Eastern Ontario to Hamilton area. In 1832, William bought the north/south Stagecoach line from John Playter of Richmond Hill. William operated the north/south stagecoach line until 1840, when he sold it to Charles P. Thompson of Summerhill, who operated a steamship service on Lake Simcoe and needed a means to move his ship passengers south to York (Toronto) The stage coach office at the apex of the building was added later. A business under the name J.M. McCuaig was located in the building as well. The M & L Samuel Company (now Samuel, Son & Co.) were based out of the building from 1855 until 1881.

The unique shape of the building was due to the intersecting roads of Front Street and Wellington Street at Church Street. The building is also seen in a Bartlett print, "Fish Market", from 1839 to 1842. Further research dates it to the early 1830s.

In the 1890s, it was replaced with the Gooderhams' Flatiron Building.

== See also ==
- Distillery District
- List of buildings named Flatiron Building
