= Gooderham Building =

Coordinates: 43.648366°N 79.374284°W

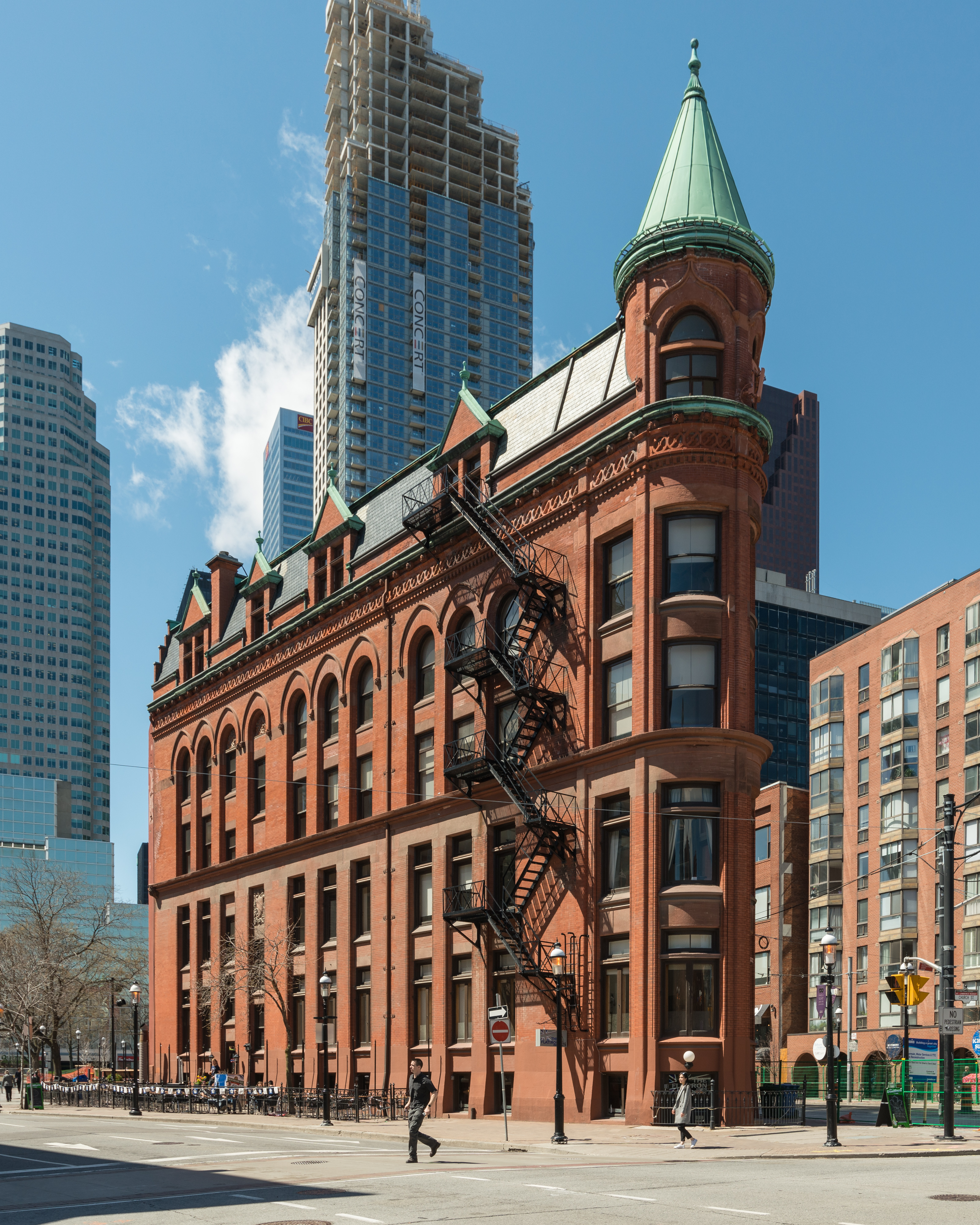
- The Gooderham Building in 2017
- Interactive map of the Gooderham Building area
- Alternative names: Flatiron Building

General information
- Type: Office building
- Architectural style: Romanesque Revival
- Location: 49 Wellington Street East; Toronto, Ontario; M5E 1C9
- Completed: 1892
- Owner: Lee Chow Group

Height
- Height: 16.70 metres (54.8 ft)

Technical details
- Floor count: 5

Design and construction
- Architect: David Roberts Jr.

Ontario Heritage Act
- Designated: 1975

The Gooderham Building, also known as the Flatiron Building, is an historic office building at 49 Wellington Street East in Toronto, Ontario, Canada. It is located on the eastern edge of the city's Financial District (east of Yonge Street) in the St. Lawrence neighbourhood, wedged between Front Street and Wellington Street in Downtown Toronto, where they join up to form a triangular intersection. Completed in 1892, the red-brick edifice was an early example of a prominent flatiron building.

The Gooderham Building is the focal point of one of Toronto's most iconic vistas: looking west down Front Street towards the building's prominent rounded corner, framed on the sides by the heritage commercial blocks along Front Street, and with the skyscrapers of the Financial District towering in the background. The CN Tower is also visible from certain angles behind Brookfield Place. This vista frequently appears in imagery of the city.

== History ==
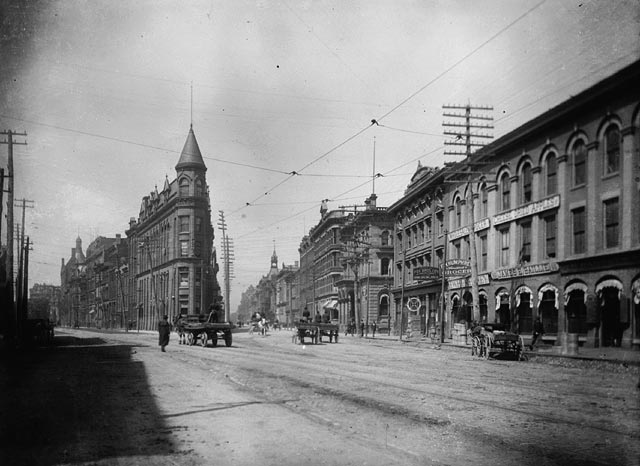
The Gooderham Building, c. 1895.

The previous building on the site was shorter, but in the same shape, and it was called the Coffin Block. The current building was designed by architect David Roberts Jr. and originally cost $18,000 to construct for distiller George Gooderham Sr. (1830–1905), a son of the Gooderham and Worts distillery's founder, William Gooderham. The building served as the office of the Gooderham and Worts distillery until 1952, and it was sold by the Gooderham family in 1957.

Bought in 1975 and saved (and partially restored) by David Walsh and Robert Phillips, further restoration took place in 1998 by owners Michael and Anne Tippin. The building was designated a historic site under the Ontario Heritage Act in 1975, then the Ontario Heritage Foundation attained a Heritage Easement in 1977. It was subsequently owned and managed by the Woodcliffe Corporation.

On 12 October 2011, the Woodcliffe Corporation announced that it would be selling the building. Previously, the building had sold for $10.1 million in 2005, and for $2.2 million in 1999. The building is currently owned and managed by Lee Chow Group.

== Architecture and art ==
The Gooderham Building is well-known both for its narrow wedge shape and for the mural on its back wall. The Flatiron Mural by renowned Canadian artist Derek Michael Besant uses a trompe-l'œil effect to not only make the wall appear to have more windows than it does, but to also give it a more mobile effect by having its edges 'fluttering' away where they are not 'tacked' down. It is a picture of the Perkins Building, which is located directly across the street.

The building has a Romanesque cornice and frieze above the arched windows on the 4th floor. The main entrance located on Wellington Street makes use of a French Gothic archway. The foundation is made of sandstone. The steep copper roof has eight gable dormers: four on the south facade and four on the north facade.

With its linear pattern of fenestration distributed equally on all floors, it conveys a light feeling of a corporate office building. The Gooderham Building is set on a high foundation that reaches half a storey above the ground. These days, it is still being used as an office building. The 1st floor uses rectangular sliding windows on the south side, but it has fixed windows on the north side. Conversely, on the 2nd floor, it uses fixed windows on the south side and rectangular sliders on the north side. On the 3rd, 4th and 5th floors, the Gooderham Building has single-hung and arch-hung windows.

The Gooderham Building has three entrances. Two of the entrances lead to the pub in the basement known as The Flatiron and Firkin. Entrance doors are in pairs, and have wooden frames for windows. The pub in the basement has a large patio around the south side of the building. Entrances for the pub are located in the basement and the 1st floor on the Front Street side. There is no public access to the pub from the building. The entrance for the Flatiron Building is located on the north side, and is made up of fanciful pinnacle dormers and arch frames with French Gothic styling.

== Berczy Park ==
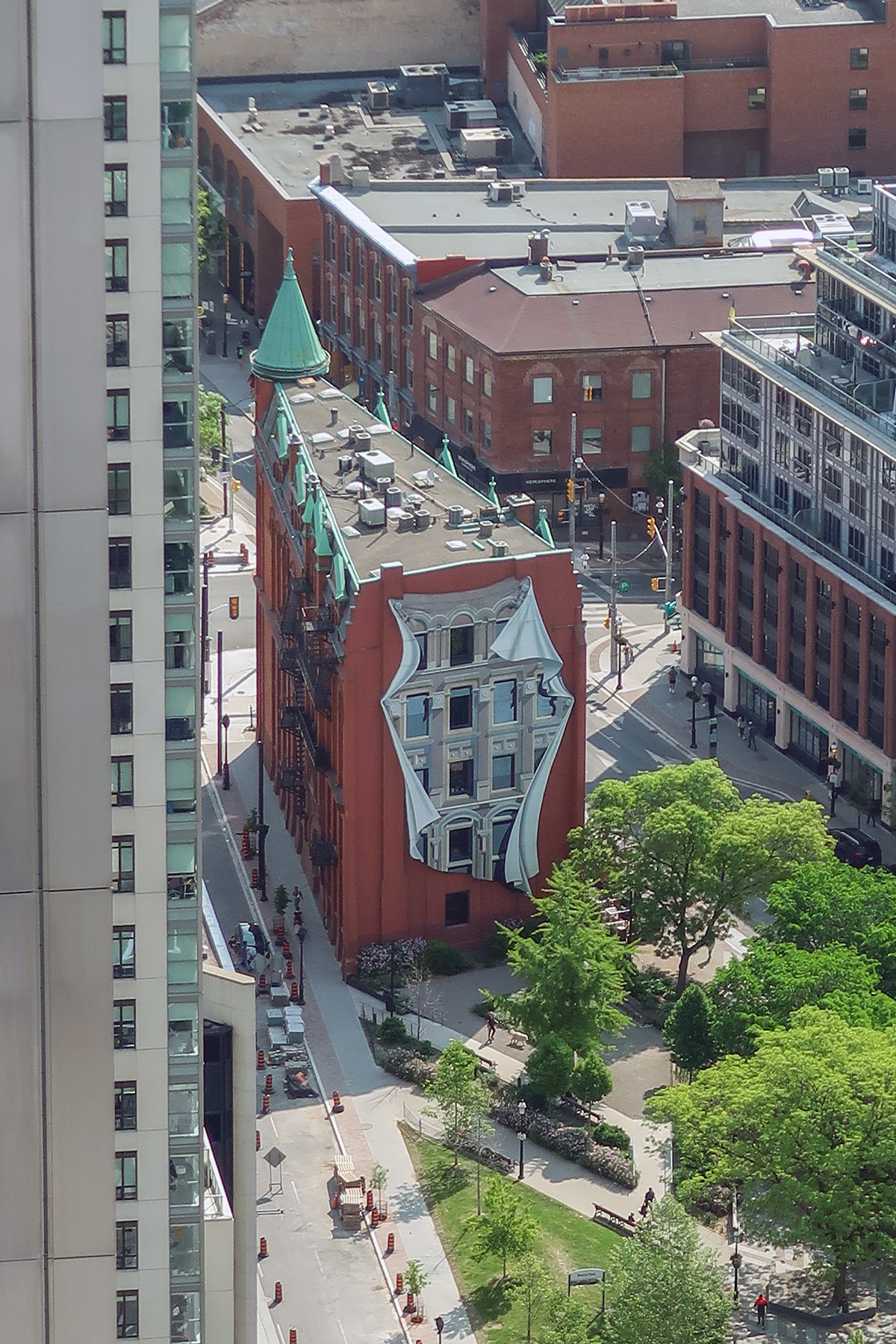
Berczy Park is a small park situated behind the Gooderham Building.

Berczy Park is a small park located behind the Gooderham Building at Front Street and Wellington Street in Toronto. The site was home to several buildings with the most notable being the Clarendon Hotel around the mid-19th century. By the late 19th century and early 20th century, commercial buildings ranging from offices, wholesalers, jewellers and lithographers occupied the area:

- Pacific Buildings at 26 to 34 Front - demolished between 1966 and 1967
- unnamed offices at 36-38 Front
- Sterns Building at 40-42 Front - home jeweller Samuel Stern until 1910 and demolished between 1962 and 1963
- unnamed silverware factory and offices at 44 Front
- unnamed wholesalers at 46-48 Front
- Janus (later as Frontwell) Building at 50 Front - demolished between 1966 and 1967

Once these buildings were demolished the site became a vacant lot and then as parking lot in the mid-1960s and informal grass lot by 1975, but did not become a city park with a few benches and walled sections in 1980. The current tree-lined city park was added and renovations, completed in 2017, added a large three-tier fountain designed by Montreal landscape architect Claude Cormier. The fountain features 27 cast-iron dogs spouting water, a cast-iron cat looking at two bird sculptures on a nearby wire, and a bone crowning the fountain. The fountain, which features a trough for dogs to drink from, became a popular destination, particularly for dog lovers.

== See also ==
- List of oldest buildings and structures in Toronto
- List of flatiron buildings
