= H.A. Higgins Building =

- U.S. National Register of Historic Places
- Columbus Register of Historic Properties
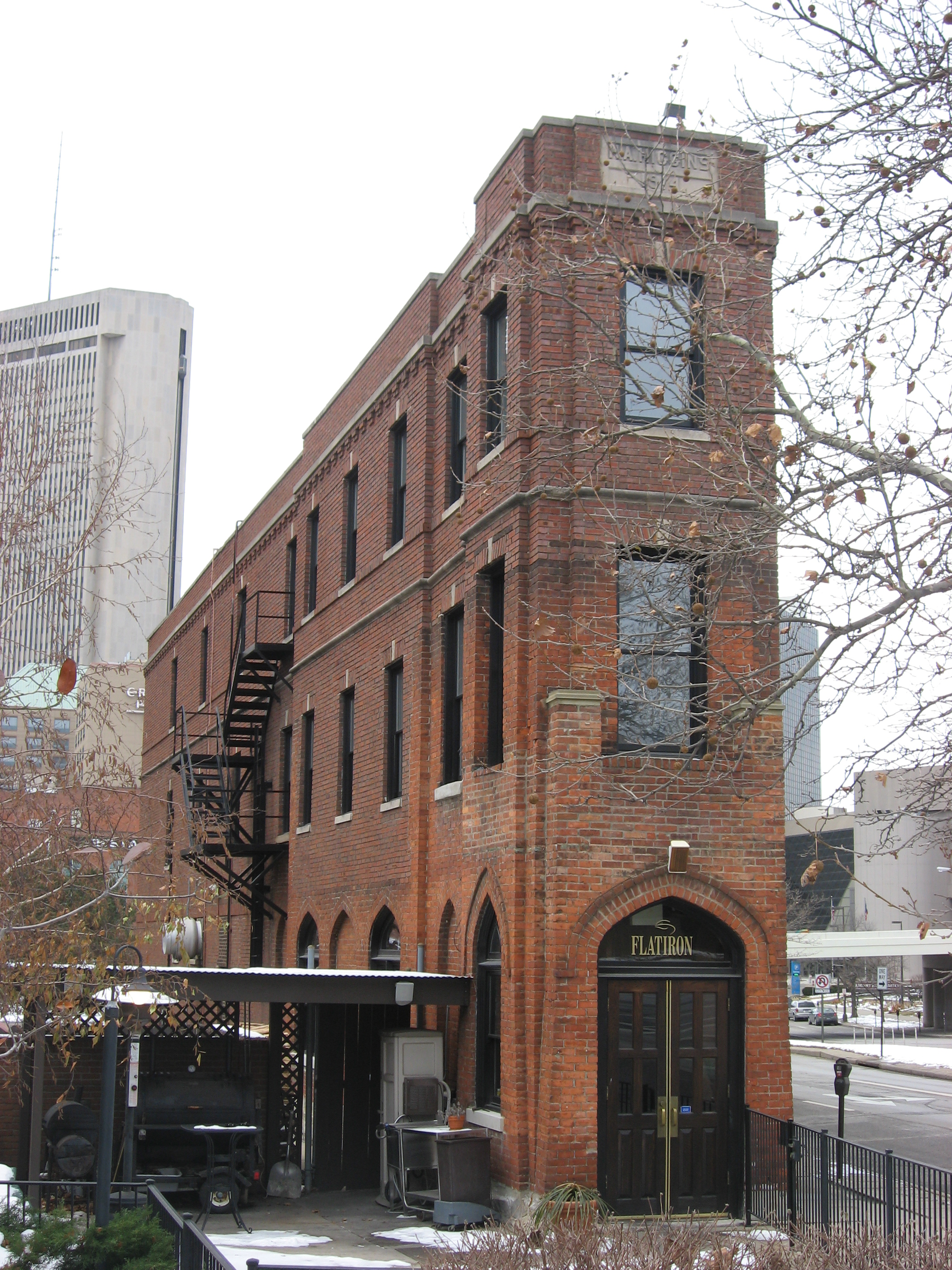
- Interactive map highlighting the building's location
- Location: 129 E. Nationwide Blvd., Columbus, Ohio
- Coordinates: 39.968774°N 82.998062°W
- Built: 1914
- Architect: Herbert Aloysius Higgins
- NRHP reference No.: 79001836
- CRHP No.: CR-26

Significant dates
- Added to NRHP: August 27, 1979
- Designated CRHP: April 2, 1984

The H.A. Higgins Building, also known as the Flatiron Building, is a historic building in Downtown Columbus, Ohio. It was listed on the National Register of Historic Places in 1979 and Columbus Register of Historic Properties in 1984. The building is architecturally unique in the city, an example of a flatiron building.

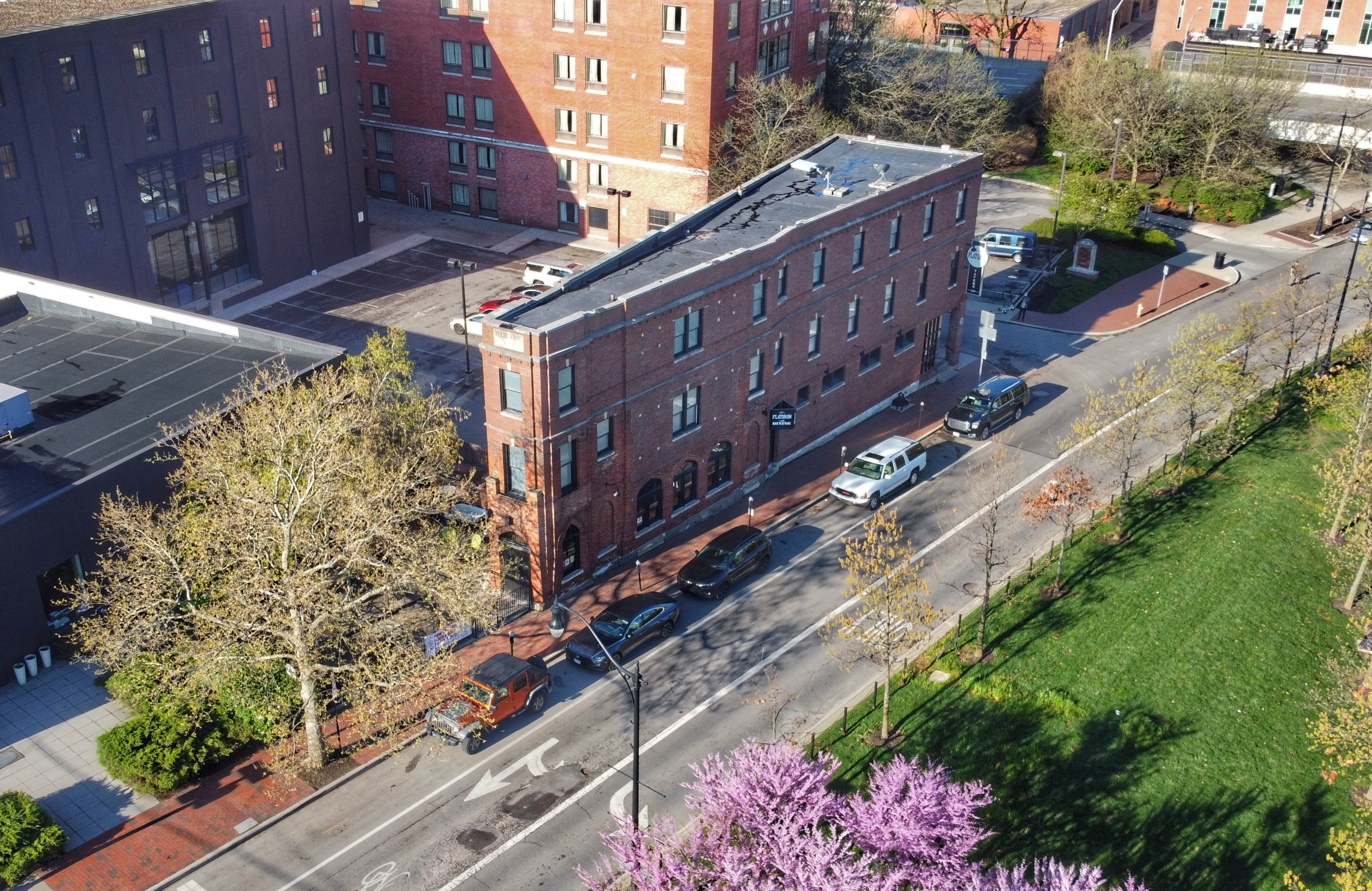
Aerial view

== See also ==
- National Register of Historic Places listings in Columbus, Ohio
