= Bittles Bar =

Bar in Belfast, Northern Ireland

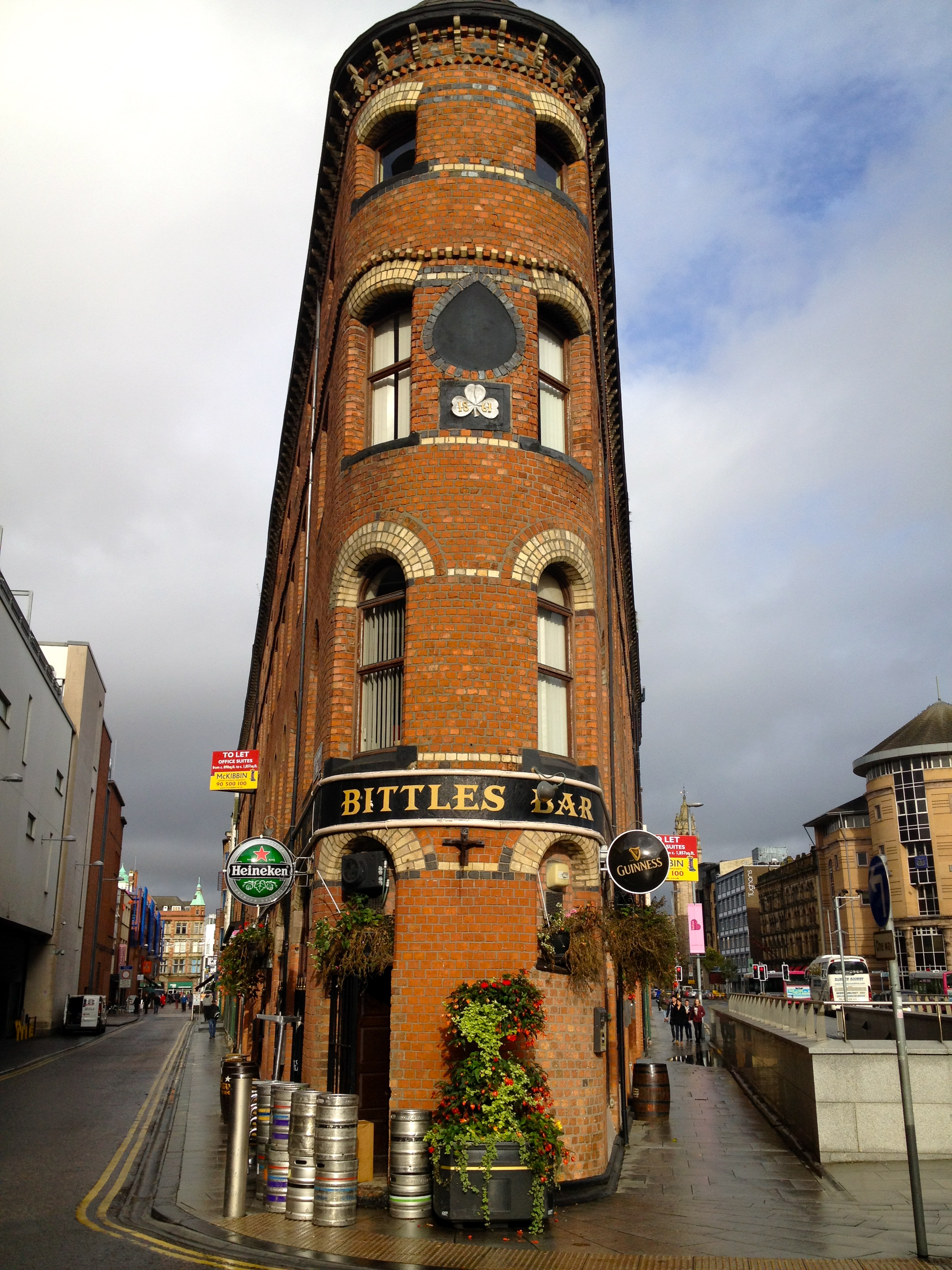
Outside of bar

Bittles Bar is a bar located near Victoria Square in central Belfast, Northern Ireland. It is one of Belfast's more curious pubs being "flat-iron" in shape. It constitutes the ground floor of a 4-storey red brick warehouse built for a flour merchant in 1868. Until the 1990s the bar was called "The Shakespeare", reflecting its theatrical clientele. In 1973 it was the site of an attempted Provisional IRA bombing: Alan Lundy, later killed in a gun attack, served ten years for the bombing.

It is noted for its eclectic range of artwork adorning the triangular lounge—portraits celebrating Ireland's literary and sporting heroes including Samuel Beckett, James Joyce, W B Yeats, Oscar Wilde, George Best, Alex Higgins and Barry McGuigan, plus some of Northern Ireland's most famous politicians.

== See also ==
- Flatiron Building
