= The Athletic Arms =

Historic Edinburgh pub

Athletic Arms
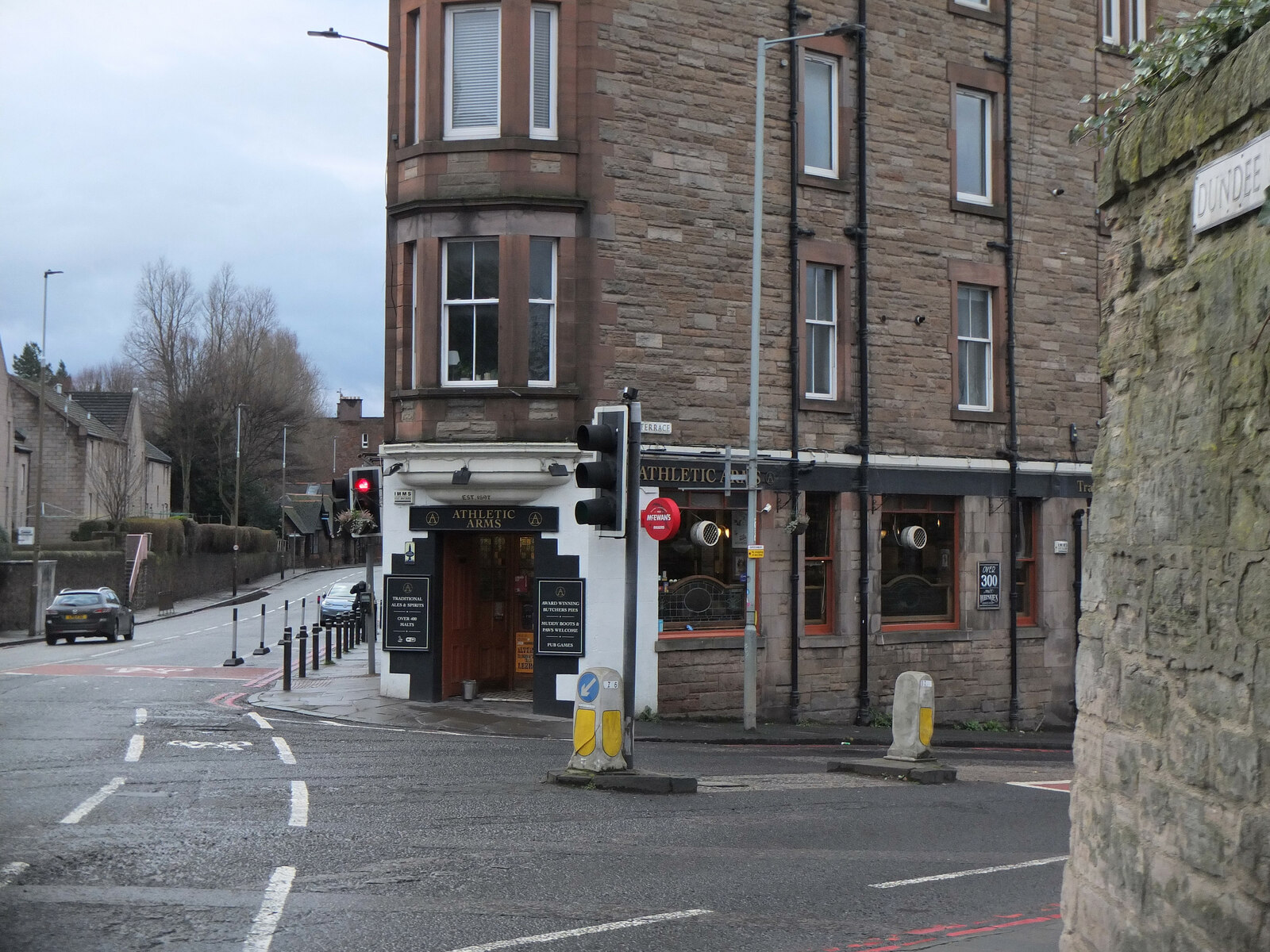
- Interactive map of the Athletic Arms area
- Alternative names: Diggers

General information
- Architectural style: Victorian
- Location: Edinburgh, 1-3 Angle Park Terrace, Edinburgh, EH11 2JX
- Opened: 1897
- Landlord: Kevin McGhee

Website
- https://athleticarms.co.uk

The Athletic Arms, commonly known as the Diggers, is a historic pub in Edinburgh, Scotland. Located near Tynecastle Park and Murrayfield, it is popular with sports fans on game days.

The pub's nickname, Diggers, comes from its location between two graveyards, which made it popular with gravediggers at the end of their shifts.

The building is an example of a late-Victorian Scottish pub, well-known for their spacious interiors and central bars. Its bar has a tall fount, a traditional way of serving draft beer in Scotland.

In December 2018, licensee Kevin McGhee won the BT Sport Manager of the Month award for the pub's close association with the Hearts football team.

In March 2020, at the start of the COVID-19 pandemic, the pub started a crowdfunding campaign to pay staff. It raised nearly £10,000.

In 2024, The Athletic Arms was shortlisted in the Best Pub category at the Scottish Bar Awards.

In 2025 The Athletic Arms was named Whisky Bar of the Year at the Scottish Bar and Pub Awards and was also shortlisted in the Pub of the Year category.

Famous patrons include actors James McAvoy and Ken Stott, and author Irvine Welsh.

In February 2026, the company behind the Athletic Arms opened a new venture “Diggers Leith” on Bernard Street, near the Shore. It also owns The Outhouse on Broughton Street Lane.

== McEwan's 80/- ==
The Athletic Arms was famous for its McEwan's 80/- (eighty shilling) beer, which was brewed at the nearby Fountain Brewery. Traditionally, patrons could hold up their fingers to indicate how many pints of 80/- they wanted. There would be up to 15 bar staff wearing red jackets at any one time. According to a sign inside the pub, "by the time [patrons] reached the bar the requested number of pints would be waiting for them.”

An unfounded rumour suggested that the pub had a direct line to the Fountain Brewery which meant it served the freshest beer. According to a 2006 BBC News article, then-owner Karl McKenna said he sold a third of all 80/- served in Edinburgh.

McEwan's stopped producing 80/- cask ale in 2006. The Athletic Arms currently serves a version of 80/- brewed by Stewart Brewing. The pub now calls itself a "specialist whisky pub", with over 700 malt whiskies at the bar.
