= Moses Block =

Coordinates: 46°29′24″N 80°59′43″W

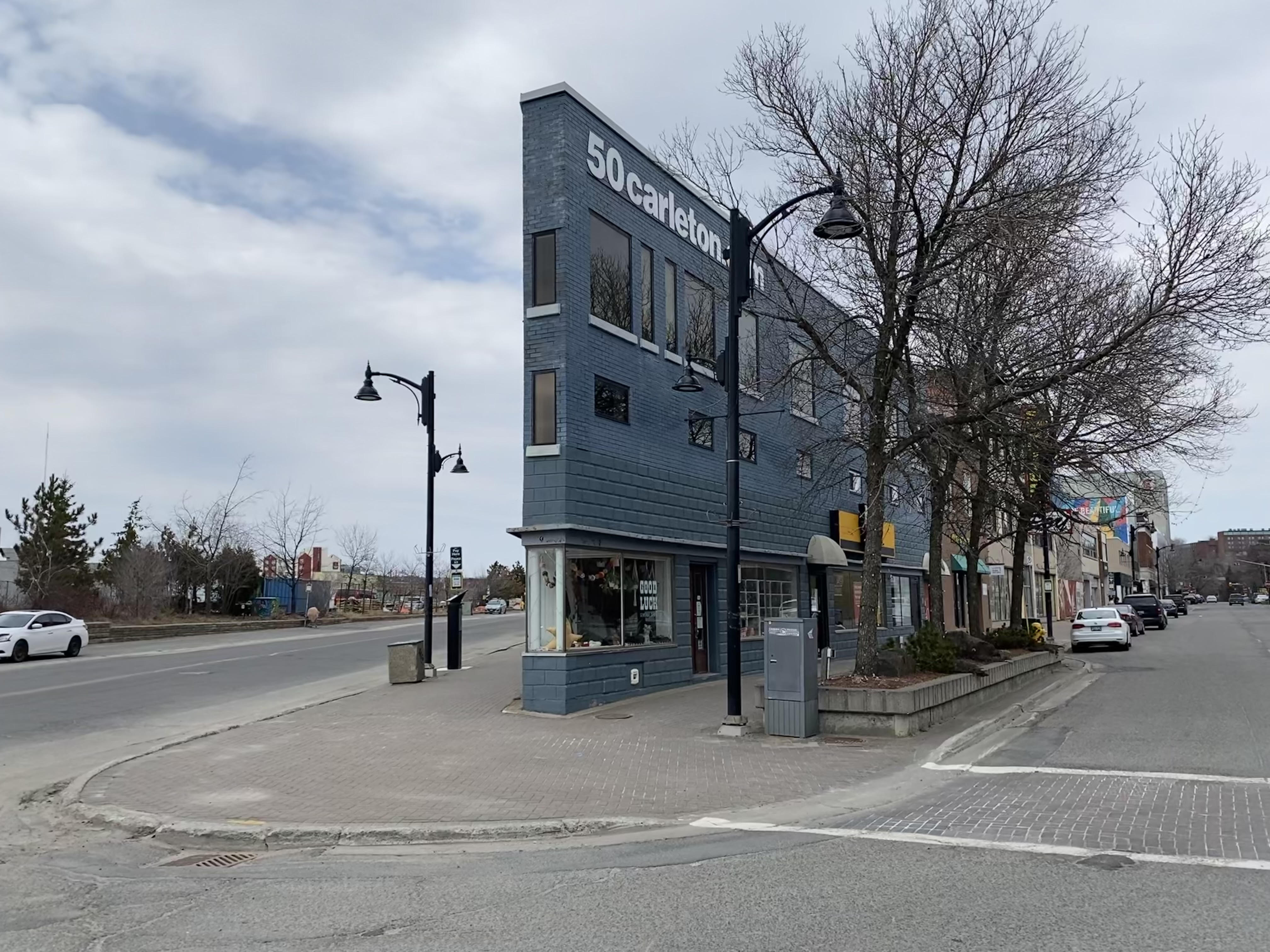

The Moses Block is located at the corner of Durham at Elgin Street in Sudbury, Ontario, Canada. It is one of only ten flatiron buildings in Canada, and one of the six within Ontario. Moses Block is a historic site in Sudbury dating back to the beginning of the 20th century. The construction date is unclear, although the building was completed sometime between 1907 and 1915 by Hascal Moses and the Moses Family. The design of the flatiron building was inspired by the famous Flatiron Building in New York City.

== History ==
The building originally housed Wolfe's Bookstore, a newspaper stand on the bottom floor owned by Wolfe Moses. Wolfe Moses owned the lucrative business from 1935 to 1973. The second floor was one of the largest raw fur businesses in Northern Ontario and Quebec, owned by Jack Leve after he served in the military. Leve traveled around Canada before setting up shop in Sudbury, Ontario.

Before a damaging fire in 1943 the building was branded on the side as "Flat Iron Building". When repairing the building Moses added a third floor to allow for more storage of books, but the branding was not replaced.

In 1975 the bookstore was purchased by John Rutherford, a University professor. As of 2021, the building is home to an advertising agency 50 Carleton, a Money Mart, and the Good Luck General Store.

The site of Moses Block was a part of the Village of Sudbury Township of McKim master plan in 1887. The approximate dimensions of the site are 9.11 metres by 21.25 metres by 21.87 metres. The approximate area of the site is 95 metre2. The neighborhood's master plan of the streets and railway lines allowed for the eventual design of the odd-shaped building.

The most famous Flatiron Building in New York City designed by architect Daniel Burnham was the first building of its kind. The building style gets its name from the resemblance to a certain household appliance. It is well known for its distinct triangular shape. Many buildings were modeled after it in the years following its construction in 1902.

== Architectural style and structure ==
Moses Block structure is characterized by the fact that it is part of a triangular-shaped block. Aside from that, the structure is very simple in nature. The brick has a stretcher bond pattern. The roof is flat, with a flat, narrow strip of metal serving as roof trim. The building's first floor was renovated, while the second and third floors were not. The windows have two panes of glass. They have lugsills and a rather simple trim. The main entrance is partly glazed and has a simple trim.

Seven large masonry buildings between Elgin and Elm are remnants of Sudbury's historic downtown core. Other buildings in the area such as the 1937 Coulson Hotel, former T. Eaton's, the Northern Ontario, and Roy's Furniture provide an insight into the scale and typology of the buildings in this area through the mid-century. Throughout the first half of the twentieth century, the downtown core bustled with railways, communication, retail, theatres, and hotels. This section of Sudbury’s downtown core is well known for its cohesive architectural typology.

Sudbury's first distinctively European architectural period, characterized by a mix of Victorian and Classical styles, was about to begin. Between the years 1907 and 1915 Sudbury experienced a building construction boom. The use of Victorian-style schools, also known as the Queen Anne revival, is most evident in the town's residential buildings. Many of the homes built featured numerous bays and dormers, which are typical of the Victorian era, as well as a near-fanatical use of classical Doric pillars.

The style of architecture of Moses Block is likely a part of the Queen Anne revival period, but it does fall at the tail end of the Art Nouveau period between 1890 and 1914. This style is commonly confused with the Art Deco period which began later in the 1920s. Art Nouveau style is a rebellion against the industrial era when designs turned attention back towards natural forms and the craftsmanship of the building. Although, "art deco, like art nouveau, did not become a dominant architectural style in Sudbury. The former, however, introduced the city to the era of modern building". By the 50s and 60s structural steel and precast concrete became trademarks of "modern" architecture. Resulting in the bulldozing of Sudbury's greatest buildings on the Elm at Durham corridor beginning with the post office building.
