= Thin House =

Block of flats in South Kensington, London, England

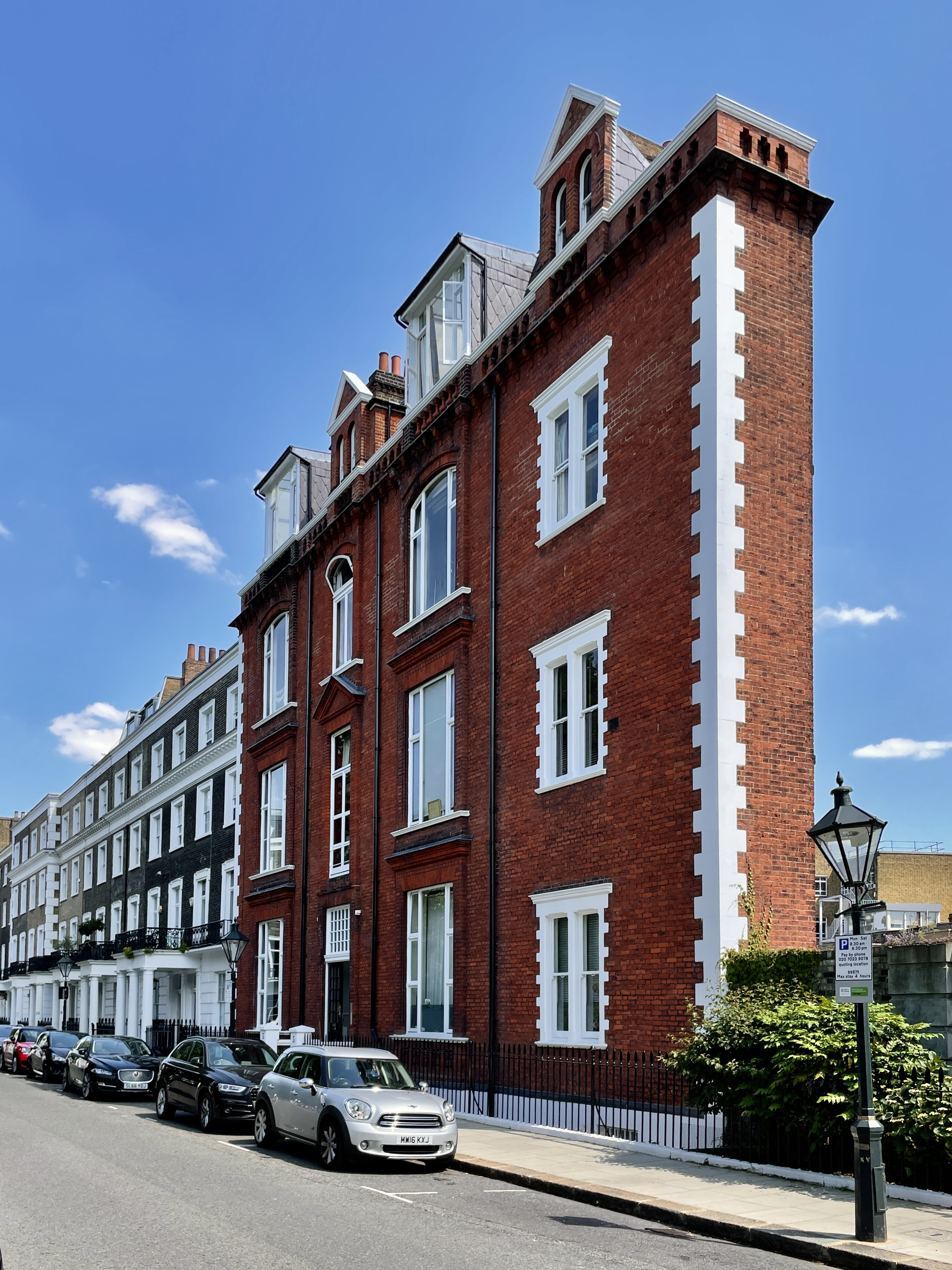
The Thin House in 2022.

Five Thurloe Square or The Thin House is a block of flats in South Kensington, London. The triangular building is 6 feet (1.8 m) wide at its narrowest. It was built between 1885 and 1887 by William Douglas on an area of land left over after the construction of South Kensington tube station. The building was initially used as artist studios.
