= Flat Iron (restaurant) =

British steak restaurant chain

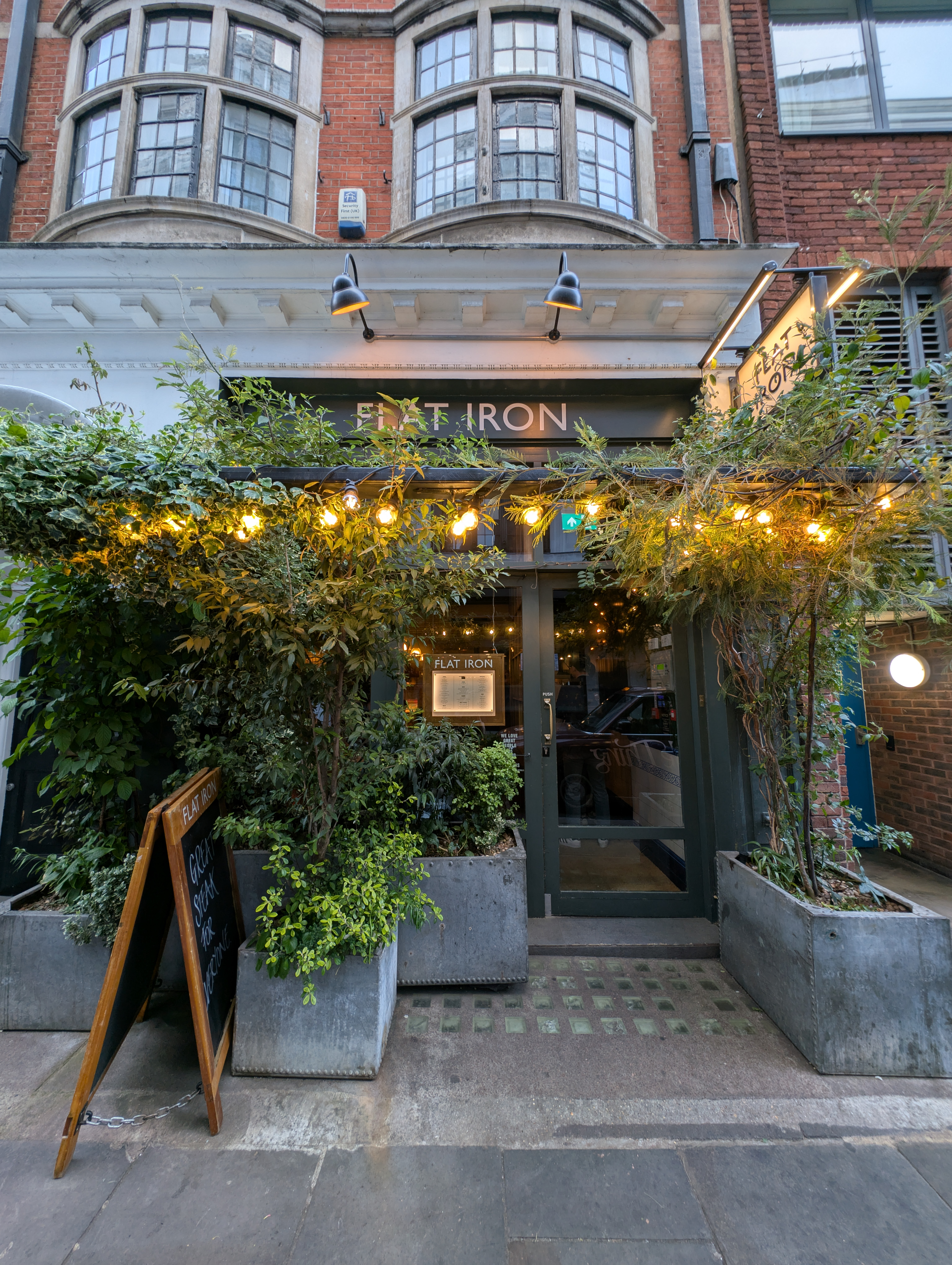
- Flat Iron, Kensington, London, 2025
- Industry: Restaurants
- Founded: 2012
- Founder: Charlie Carroll
- Headquarters: London, United Kingdom
- Number of locations: 20
- Area served: Greater London, Brighton, Bristol, Cambridge, Leeds, Manchester
- Key people: Charlie Carroll, Tom Byng
- Website: https://flatironsteak.co.uk/

Flat Iron is a British steak restaurant chain.

Flat Iron was founded by Charlie Carroll. The first restaurant opened in 2012 in the heart of Soho, London.

Their flat iron steak is a cut from the featherblade, taken from just below the shoulder of the animal.

Flat Iron have their own herd of cattle, the Flat Iron herd, who are looked after in Thirsk, North Yorkshire.

As of December 2025, there are 20 restaurants: 15 being in London (Borough, Covent Garden, Hammersmith, Kensington, Kings Cross, London Bridge, Marylebone, Shoreditch, Soho, Southbank, Spitalfields, Tottenham Court Road, Victoria, Waterloo and Westfield London) with one restaurant each in Cambridge, Leeds, Manchester, Brighton, and Bristol. Further expansion is planned, with new restaurants set to open in Piccadilly, London and Newcastle upon Tyne in Spring 2026, followed by an additional opening in Liverpool in Autumn 2026.
