= National Register of Historic Places listings in Carroll County, Arkansas =

Location of Carroll County in Arkansas

This is a list of the National Register of Historic Places listings in Carroll County, Arkansas.

This is intended to be a complete list of the properties and districts on the National Register of Historic Places in Carroll County, Arkansas, United States. The locations of National Register properties and districts for which the latitude and longitude coordinates are included below, may be seen in a map.

There are 30 properties and districts listed on the National Register in the county. Another property was once listed but has been removed.

== Current listings ==
	Name on the Register	Image	Date listed	Location	City or town	Description
1	Beaver Bridge	Beaver Bridge	April 9, 1990 (#90000730)	Highway 187, over the White River; 36°28′15″N 93°46′06″W	Beaver	
2	Berryville Agriculture Building	Berryville Agriculture Building	September 10, 1992 (#92001214)	South of Freeman Ave., east of Linda St., north of W. College Ave., and west of Ferguson St. 36°22′07″N 93°34′33″W	Berryville	
3	Berryville Commercial Historic District	Berryville Commercial Historic District	March 24, 2016 (#16000402)	Public Square; 36°21′52″N 93°34′03″W	Berryville	
4	Berryville Gymnasium	Berryville Gymnasium	September 10, 1992 (#92001215)	South of Freeman Ave., east of Linda St., north of W. College Ave., and west of Ferguson St. 36°22′08″N 93°34′33″W	Berryville	
5	Berryville Post Office	Berryville Post Office	August 14, 1998 (#98000922)	101 E. Madison Ave. 36°21′52″N 93°33′56″W	Berryville	
6	Blue Spring Shelter	Blue Spring Shelter	December 20, 2002 (#02001596)	Blue Spring Heritage Center, CR 210; 36°24′10″N 93°44′11″W	Eureka Springs	Native American prehistoric site
7	Carroll County Courthouse, Eastern District	Carroll County Courthouse, Eastern District	August 27, 1976 (#76000392)	Public Sq. 36°21′51″N 93°34′04″W	Berryville	
8	Carroll County Poor Farm Cemetery		May 24, 2006 (#06000412)	Address Restricted	Pleasant Valley	
9	Concord School House	Concord School House	March 9, 2009 (#08001334)	805 County Road 309; 36°23′13″N 93°40′57″W	Eureka Springs	
10	W.D. Crawford House	W.D. Crawford House	November 20, 1992 (#92001613)	East of County Road 27, about 1 mile north of its junction with County Road 98; 36°23′00″N 93°29′48″W	Cisco	
11	Crescent Hotel	Crescent Hotel	January 26, 2016 (#15000991)	75 Prospect Ave. 36°24′30″N 93°44′15″W	Eureka Springs	
12	Dog Branch School	Dog Branch School	September 8, 1992 (#92001177)	South of U.S. Highway 412, approximately 3 miles east of Osage; 36°12′12″N 93°21′28″W	Osage	
13	Eureka Springs Cemetery		June 8, 2018 (#100002535)	NW of jct. of Cty. Rd. 205 & US 62 E 36°23′52″N 93°42′17″W	Eureka Springs	
14	Eureka Springs Historic District	Eureka Springs Historic District	December 18, 1970 (#70000118)	Most of Eureka Springs and its environs; also S. Main; 36°24′06″N 93°44′18″W	Eureka Springs	South Main represents a boundary increase of January 29, 1979
15	Green Forest Water Tower	Green Forest Water Tower	May 22, 2007 (#07000470)	Southeast of the junction of S. Springfield St. and E. 2nd St. 36°20′11″N 93°26′08″W	Green Forest	
16	Kenner Cemetery		May 25, 2022 (#100007756)	18141 AR 103 South; 36°09′43″N 93°24′47″W	Osage	
17	Lake Leatherwood Park Historic District	Lake Leatherwood Park Historic District	November 24, 1998 (#98001346)	Between U.S. Highway 62 and Highway 23 at Leatherwood Lake; 36°26′07″N 93°45′37″W	Eureka Springs	
18	Lake Leatherwood Recreational Facilities	Lake Leatherwood Recreational Facilities	August 12, 1992 (#90001942)	End of County Road 61; 36°26′04″N 93°45′34″W	Eureka Springs	
19	Mo-Ark Baptist Academy	Mo-Ark Baptist Academy	September 27, 1996 (#96001030)	South of the western terminus of Park St. 36°29′52″N 93°23′57″W	Blue Eye	
20	Mulladay Hollow Bridge	Mulladay Hollow Bridge	April 6, 1990 (#90000531)	County Road 61, over Mulladay Hollow Creek; 36°26′06″N 93°45′56″W	Eureka Springs	
21	Old U.S. 62, Busch Segment	Old U.S. 62, Busch Segment	September 25, 2008 (#08000942)	County Roads 107, 109, and 173; 36°26′55″N 93°49′47″W	Busch	
22	Quigley's Castle	Quigley's Castle	May 30, 2003 (#03000467)	274 Quigley's Castle Rd. 36°20′46″N 93°45′21″W	Eureka Springs	
23	Sanitarium Lake Bridges Historic District	Sanitarium Lake Bridges Historic District	January 19, 2010 (#09001238)	County Road 317, approximately 0.5 miles south of Greenwood Hollow Rd. 36°22′30″N 93°44′02″W	Eureka Springs	
24	Shady Grove Delmar Church and School	Shady Grove Delmar Church and School	January 27, 2015 (#14001197)	Cty. Rd. 933, 1.4 mi. W. of Delmar; 36°10′07″N 93°21′44″W	Delmar vicinity	
25	Stamps Store	Stamps Store	September 5, 1990 (#90001380)	AR 103 south of U.S. Highway 412; 36°10′58″N 93°24′16″W	Osage	
26	Tall Pines Motor Inn	Tall Pines Motor Inn	January 15, 1999 (#98001603)	U.S. Highway 62; 36°24′18″N 93°45′08″W	Eureka Springs	
27	Thorncrown Chapel	Thorncrown Chapel	April 28, 2000 (#97000452)	U.S. Highway 62, 0.5 miles west of Eureka Springs; 36°25′01″N 93°46′13″W	Eureka Springs	
28	U.S. 62 White River Bridge	U.S. 62 White River Bridge	January 24, 2008 (#07001421)	U.S. Highway 62, approximately ¼ mile south of County Road 212; 36°27′04″N 93°49′24″W	Eureka Springs	
29	Winona Church and School	Winona Church and School	June 5, 1991 (#91000688)	Rockhouse Rd. 36°19′58″N 93°40′54″W	Winona Springs	
30	Yell Masonic Lodge Hall	Yell Masonic Lodge Hall	November 1, 1984 (#84000178)	CR 912, off U.S. Route 412; 36°15′49″N 93°19′19″W	Carrollton	Two-story wood-frame meeting house built in 1876.

== Former listing ==
	Name on the Register	Image	Date listed	Date removed	Location	City or town	Description
1	James C. Chaney House	James C. Chaney House	November 20, 1989 (#89002012)	September 20, 2006	AR 68; 36°00′22″N 93°11′19″W	Osage	Delisted after partial relocation to Jasper in 1999.

== Counties in Arkansas ==
Contents: Counties in Arkansas
- Arkansas
- Ashley
- Baxter
- Benton
- Boone
- Bradley
- Calhoun
- Carroll
- Chicot
- Clark
- Clay
- Cleburne
- Cleveland
- Columbia
- Conway
- Craighead
- Crawford
- Crittenden
- Cross
- Dallas
- Desha
- Drew
- Faulkner
- Franklin
- Fulton
- Garland
- Grant
- Greene
- Hempstead
- Hot Spring
- Howard
- Independence
- Izard
- Jackson
- Jefferson
- Johnson
- Lafayette
- Lawrence
- Lee
- Lincoln
- Little River
- Logan
- Lonoke
- Madison
- Marion
- Miller
- Mississippi
- Monroe
- Montgomery
- Nevada
- Newton
- Ouachita
- Perry
- Phillips
- Pike
- Poinsett
- Polk
- Pope
- Prairie
- Pulaski (Little Rock)
- Randolph
- St. Francis
- Saline
- Scott
- Searcy
- Sebastian
- Sevier
- Sharp
- Stone
- Union
- Van Buren
- Washington
- White
- Woodruff
- Yell

This National Park Service list is complete through NPS recent listings posted January 2, 2026.

== See also ==
- List of National Historic Landmarks in Arkansas
- National Register of Historic Places listings in Arkansas
