= Dog Branch School =

- U.S. National Register of Historic Places
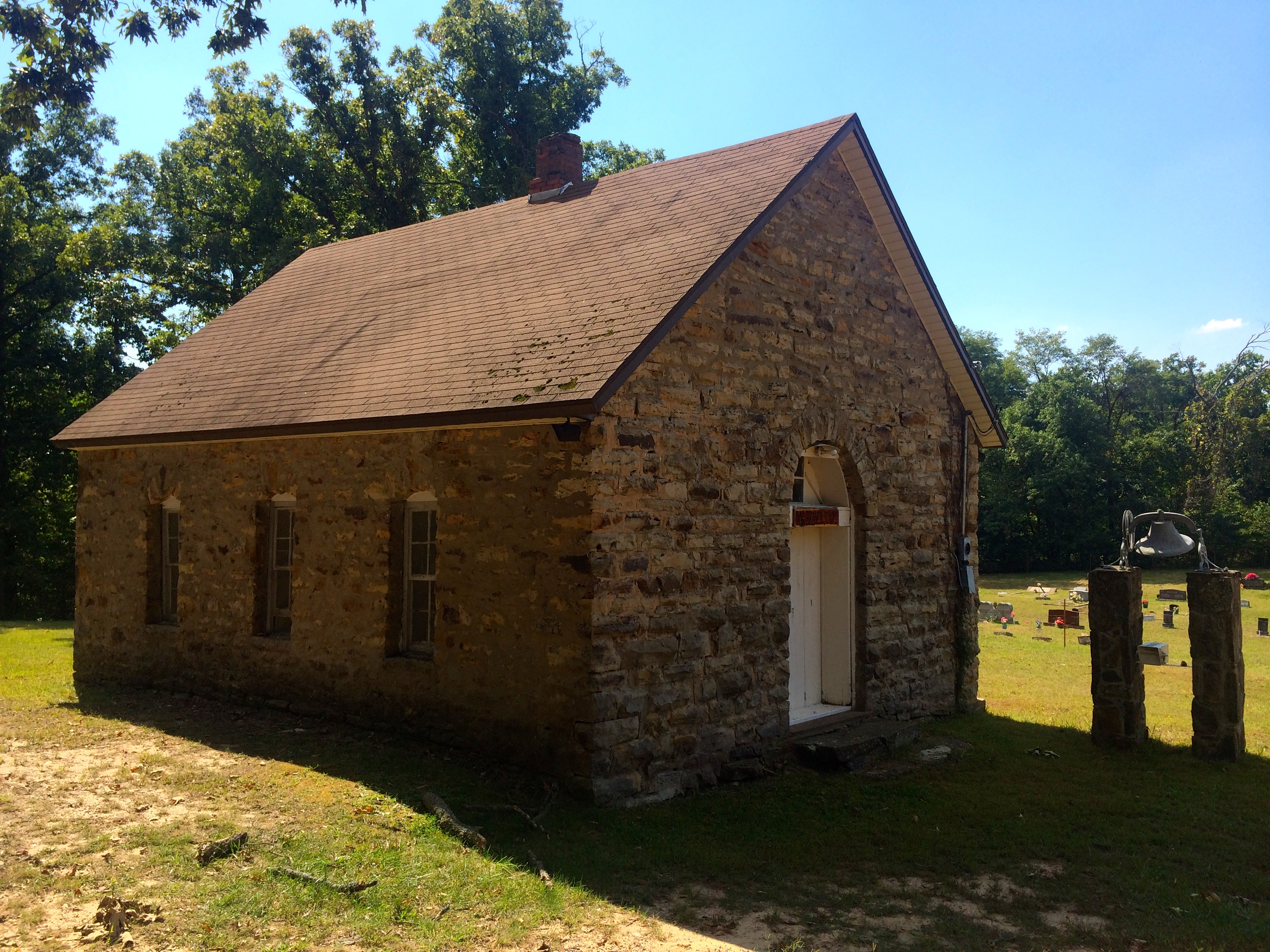

- Location within Arkansas Location within the United States
- Nearest city: Osage, Arkansas
- Coordinates: 36°12′12″N 93°21′28″W
- Area: less than one acre
- Built: 1898
- Built by: Bailey Bros.
- Architectural style: Late 19th and Early 20th Century American Movements, Italianate, Romanesque
- NRHP reference No.: 92001177
- Added to NRHP: September 8, 1992

The Dog Branch School is a historic one-room schoolhouse building in rural southeastern Carroll County, Arkansas. It is located about 3 miles (4.8 km) east of the hamlet of Osage, a short way south of United States Route 412 off County Road 927. It is a single story gable-roofed structure, built out of rough-hewn fieldstone. It has a very limited, vernacular amount of Romanesque Revival and Italianate features, including an arched entry opening and segmented-arch openings for the windows. The school was built in 1898, and is unusual mainly because most district schools built in the region at the time were built out of wood. Its builders, the Bailey Brothers, also built the Stamps Store in Osage.

The building was listed on the National Register of Historic Places in 1992.

== See also ==
- National Register of Historic Places listings in Carroll County, Arkansas
