= Carroll County Courthouse, Eastern District =

- U.S. National Register of Historic Places
- U.S. Historic district – Contributing property
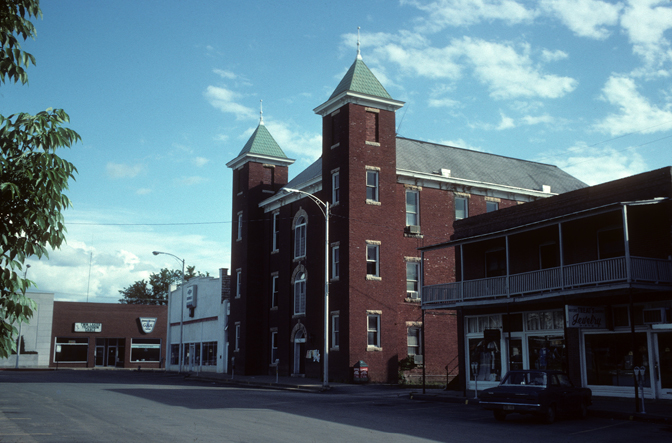

- Location within Arkansas Location within the United States
- Location: Public Sq., Berryville, Arkansas
- Coordinates: 36°21′51″N 93°34′4″W
- Area: less than one acre
- Built: 1880
- Architect: Fancher, J.P.
- Part of: Berryville Commercial Historic District (ID16000402)
- NRHP reference No.: 76000392

Significant dates
- Added to NRHP: August 27, 1976
- Designated CP: March 24, 2016

The Carroll County Courthouse, Eastern District is a historic courthouse at Public Square in the center of Berryville, one of the county seats of Carroll County, Arkansas. Built in 1881 and repeatedly enlarged, it is now a three-story brick structure with a truncated hip roof, and a pair of four-story towers at its front corners, which are topped by pyramidal roofs. The courthouse was built shortly after Berryville replaced Carrollton as the county seat, and before Eureka Springs was chosen as the county's western seat. The building now houses the Heritage Center Museum of the Carroll County Historical Society.

The building was listed on the National Register of Historic Places in 1976.

== See also ==
- National Register of Historic Places listings in Carroll County, Arkansas
