= Concord School House =

Concord School House may refer to:

- Concord School House (Arkansas)
- Concord School House (Philadelphia), Pennsylvania
