= Yell Masonic Lodge Hall =

Historic American Masonic lodge

- U.S. National Register of Historic Places
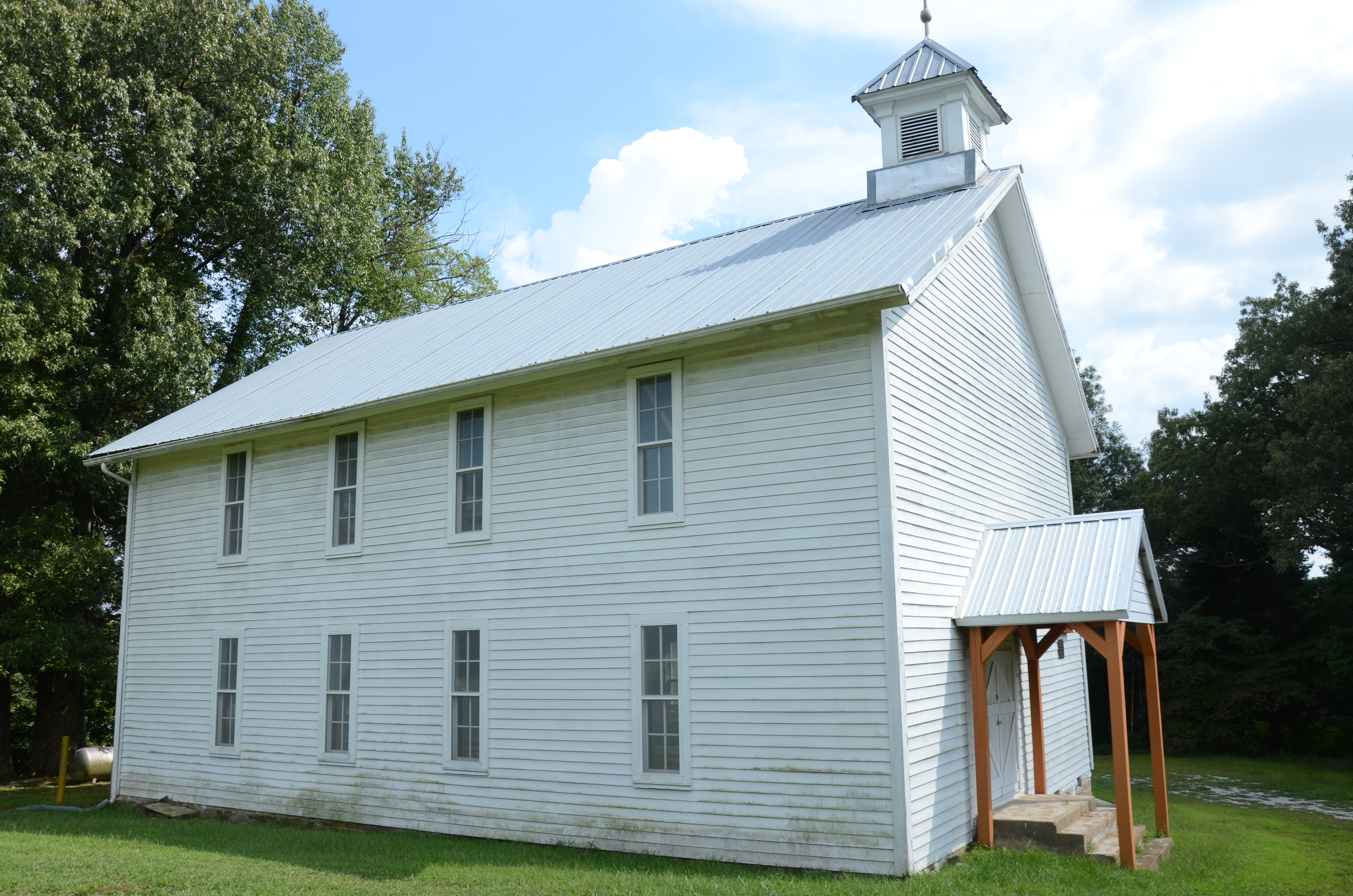

- Location within Arkansas Location within the United States
- Location: Off AR 68, Carrollton, Arkansas
- Coordinates: 36°15′47″N 93°19′18″W
- Area: 0.9 acres (0.36 ha)
- Built: 1876
- Architectural style: Masonic Temple
- NRHP reference No.: 84000178
- Added to NRHP: November 1, 1984

The Yell Masonic Lodge Hall is a historic Masonic lodge on the west side of United States Route 412 in Carrollton, Arkansas. Also known as Carrollton Masonic Lodge, it is a two-story wood-frame structure measuring about 50 by 35 feet with a front-gable roof, clapboard siding, and a stone foundation. A small belfry rises above the roof, capped by a pyramidal roof. The building was built in 1876, originally serving as a church on the ground floor, and a Masonic meeting hall for Yell Lodge #64 on the second. The building was a major community center for Carrollton, which was the first county seat of Carroll County but declined in importance after it was bypassed by the railroads.

In 1962, in a state of decay, the structure was rebuilt by the Arkansas Parks and Publicity Commission. It was listed on the National Register of Historic Places in 1984.

== See also ==
- National Register of Historic Places listings in Carroll County, Arkansas
