= Winona Church and School =

Historic church in Arkansas, United States

- U.S. National Register of Historic Places
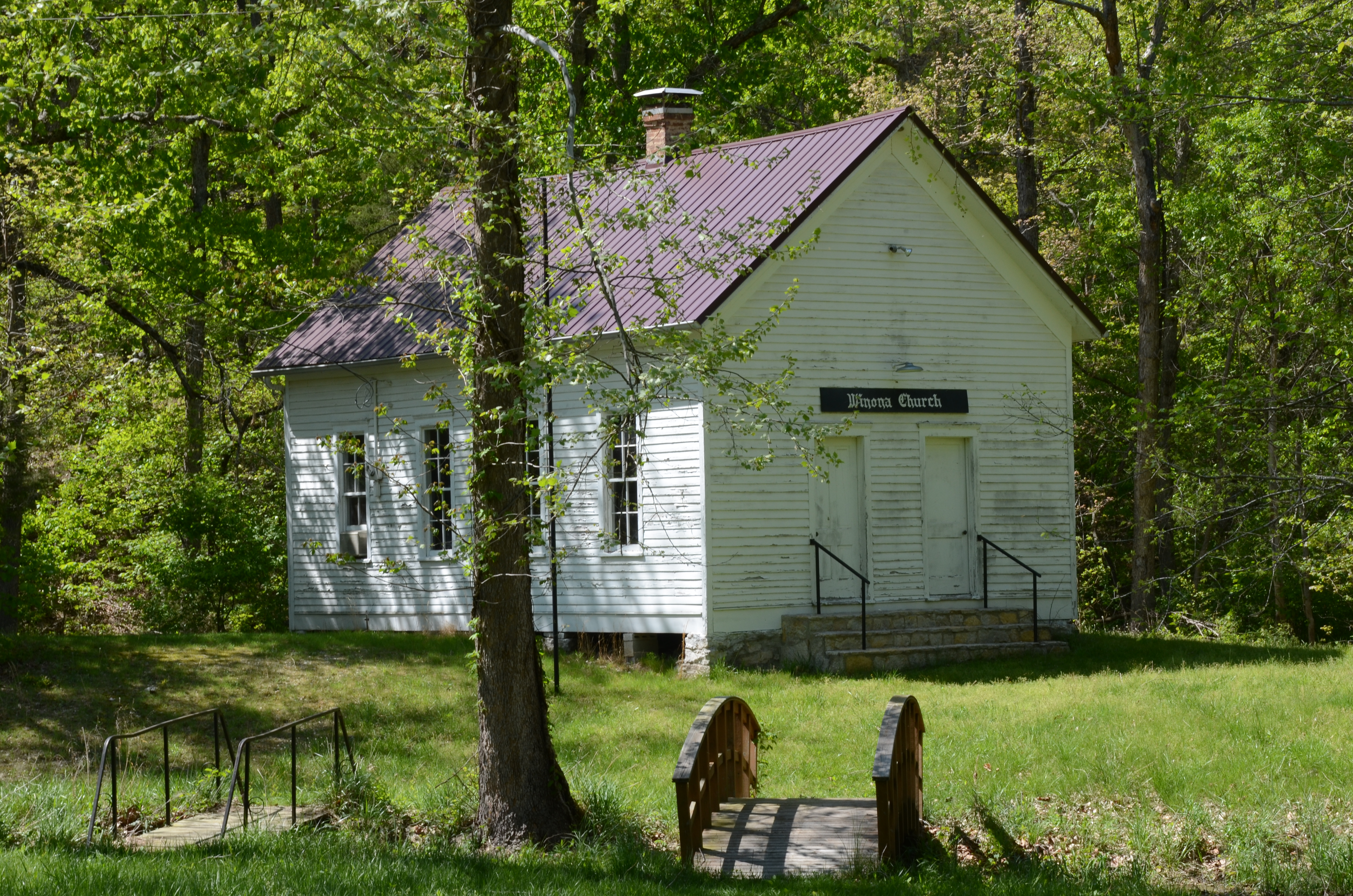

- Location within Arkansas Location within the United States
- Location: Rockhouse Road, Winona Township, Carroll County, Arkansas
- Coordinates: 36°19′58″N 93°40′54″W
- Area: less than one acre
- Built: 1881
- Architect: Pinkley, George; Clark, Joe
- Architectural style: Greek Revival, Other, Vernacular Greek Revival
- NRHP reference No.: 91000688
- Added to NRHP: June 5, 1991

The Winona Church and School is a historic church on Rockhouse Road in Winona Township, Carroll County, Arkansas, USA. The building, a single story wood-frame structure with a gable roof, weatherboard siding, and modest Greek Revival styling, was built c. 1890 for use as both a school and a church, a common regional practice of the time. It originally had a small pyramidal belfry, but the bell was stolen and the belfry removed when the roof was replaced. Other alterations include the replacement of the old stone piers with concrete piers as its foundation.

The building was listed on the National Register of Historic Places in 1991.

== See also ==
- National Register of Historic Places listings in Carroll County, Arkansas
