= Shady Grove Delmar Church and School =

Historic church in Arkansas, United States

- U.S. National Register of Historic Places
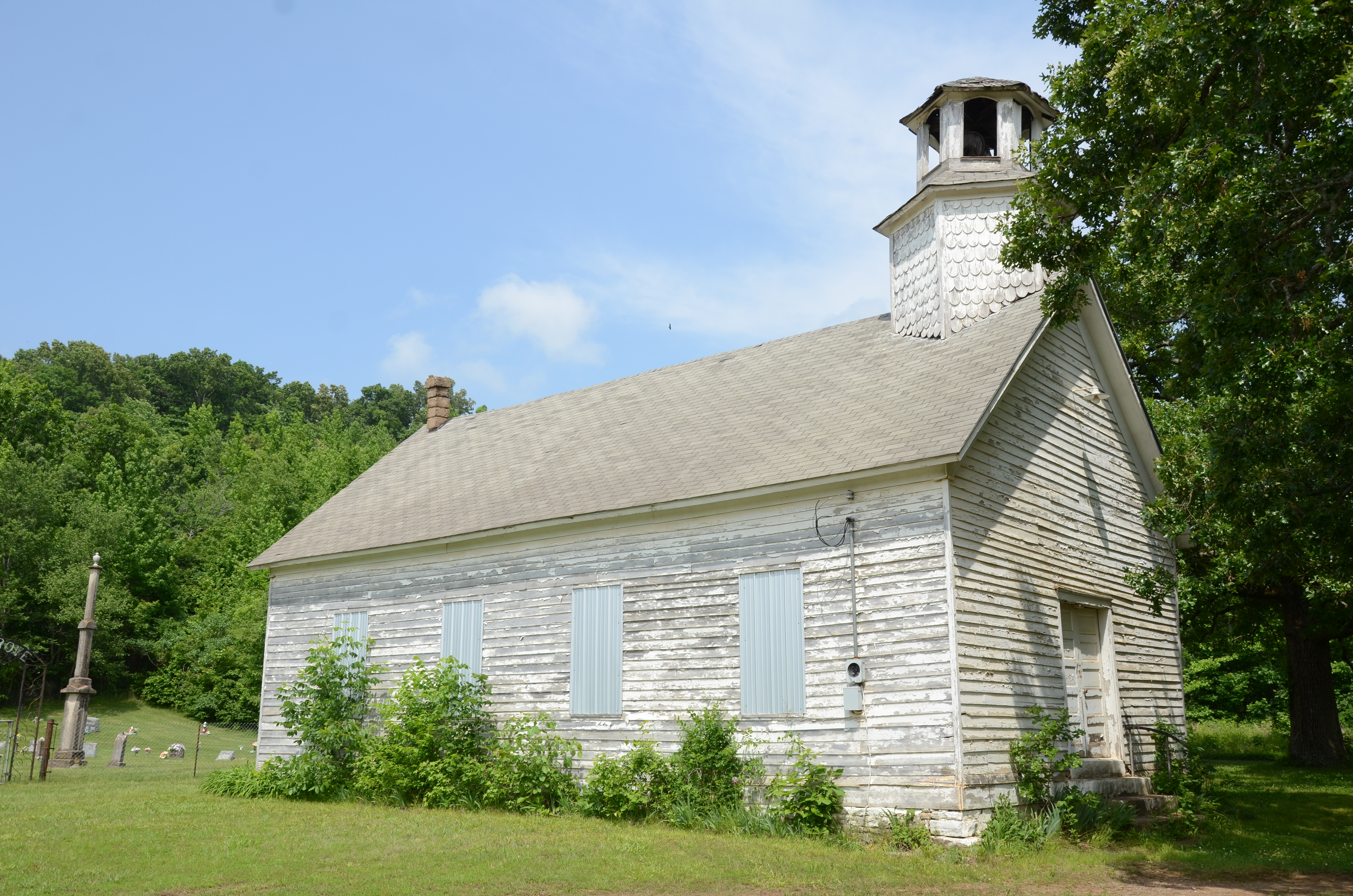

- Location within Arkansas Location within the United States
- Location: Cty. Rd. 933, 1.4 mi. W. of Delmar, Delmar, Arkansas vicinity
- Coordinates: 36°9′51″N 93°21′11″W
- Area: less than one acre
- Built: c. 1880
- Architectural style: Vernacular
- NRHP reference No.: 14001197
- Added to NRHP: January 27, 2015

Shady Grove Delmar Church and School is a historic church and school building in rural Carroll County, Arkansas, US. The building, a single story wood-frame structure with a gable roof, weatherboard siding, and a distinctive hexagonal tower with belfry and cupola. The building was built c. 1880 to provide a space for both religious services and a district school. It is a virtually unaltered example of the type, which was once common in rural Arkansas. The building is located on County Road 933, about 1.4 miles (2.3 km) west of the hamlet of Delmar, on the north side of Osage Creek.

The building was listed on the National Register of Historic Places in 2015.

== See also ==
- National Register of Historic Places listings in Carroll County, Arkansas
