= Carroll County Poor Farm Cemetery =

Historic cemetery in Arkansas, US

- U.S. National Register of Historic Places
- Nearest city: Pleasant Valley, Carroll County, Arkansas
- Area: less than one acre
- Built: 1900
- NRHP reference No.: 06000412
- Added to NRHP: May 24, 2006

The Carroll County Poor Farm Cemetery is a historic cemetery in rural Carroll County, Arkansas, near the small community of Pleasant Valley. It is all that is left of the county's poor farm, which operated from c. 1900 into the 1930s. The county purchased the land on which it operated between 1900 and 1907, and the farm was recorded as having an indigent population of 14 in the 1930 census. The farm's buildings were demolished sometime after its closure, which was occasioned by the rise in federally sponsored welfare programs.

The cemetery was listed on the National Register of Historic Places in 2006.

== See also ==
- National Register of Historic Places listings in Carroll County, Arkansas
