= Berryville Commercial Historic District =

Historic district in Arkansas, United States

- U.S. National Register of Historic Places
- U.S. Historic district
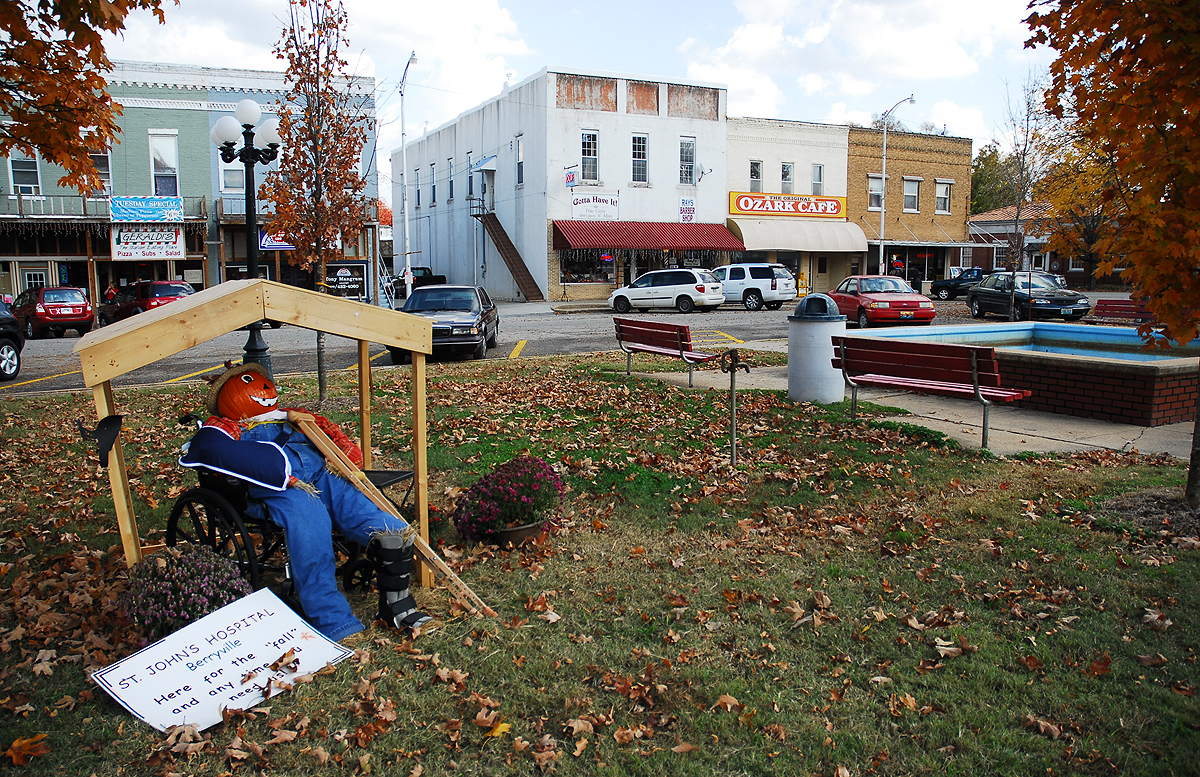

- Location within Arkansas Location within the United States
- Location: Public Square, Berryville, Arkansas
- Coordinates: 36°21′52″N 93°34′3″W
- Area: 24 acres (9.7 ha)
- NRHP reference No.: 16000402
- Added to NRHP: March 24, 2016

The Berryville Commercial Historic District encompasses the commercial heart of the city of Berryville, Arkansas. Centered on the city's public square and radiating out along some of the flanking roads, the district encompasses commercial architecture spanning a century (1850–1950), as well as two municipal parks. Most of the buildings are one- and two-story commercial buildings from either the late 19th or early 20th century. The district, listed on the National Register of Historic Places in 2016, includes the previously listed Carroll County Courthouse, Eastern District and Berryville Post Office.

== See also ==
- National Register of Historic Places listings in Carroll County, Arkansas
