= Berryville Post Office =

- U.S. National Register of Historic Places
- U.S. Historic district – Contributing property
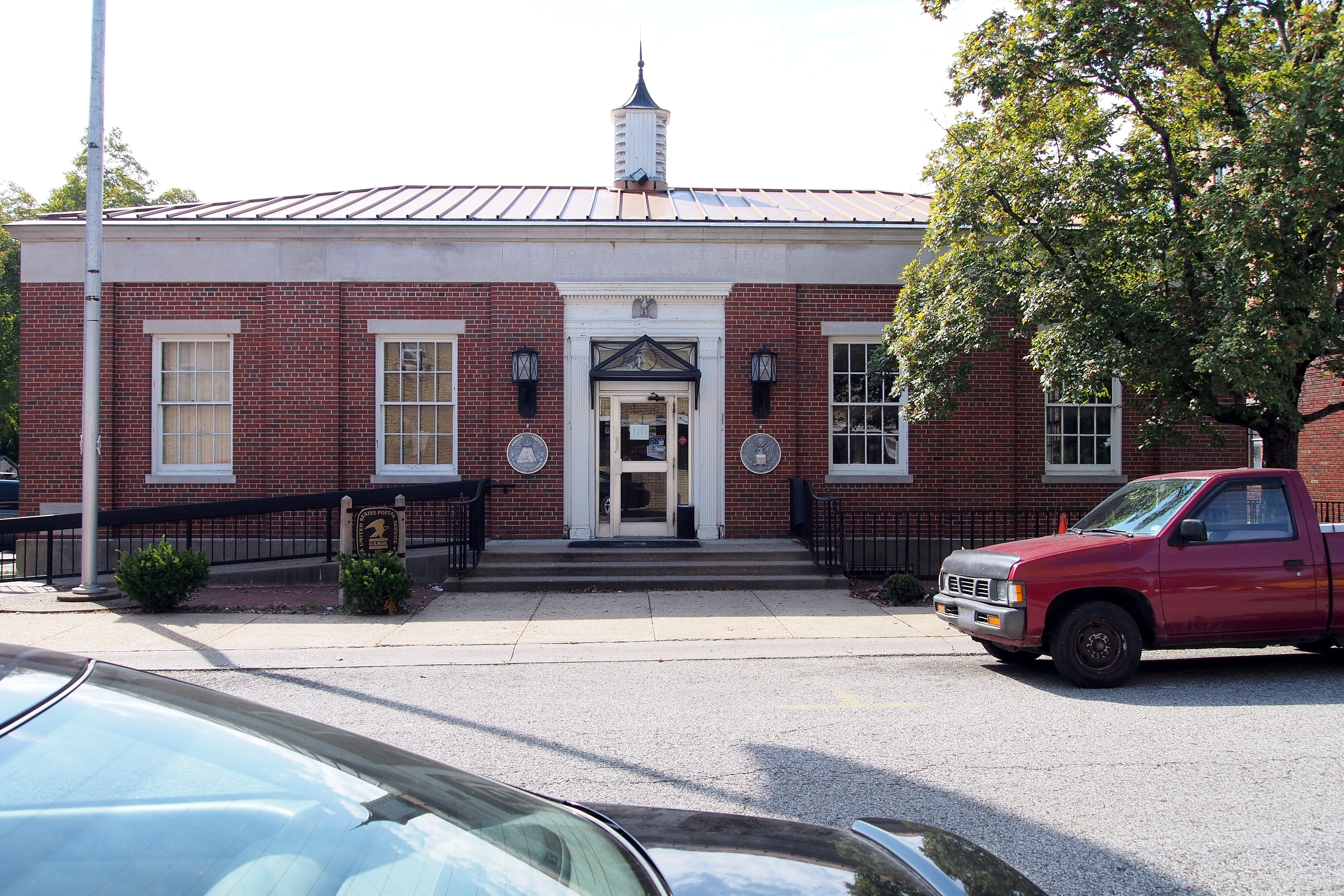

- Location within Arkansas Location within the United States
- Location: 101 E. Madison Ave., Berryville, Arkansas
- Coordinates: 36°21′52″N 93°33′56″W
- Area: less than one acre
- Built: 1938
- Architect: Olney, Daniel; et al.
- Architectural style: Colonial Revival
- Part of: Berryville Commercial Historic District (ID16000402)
- MPS: Post Offices with Section Art in Arkansas MPS
- NRHP reference No.: 98000922

Significant dates
- Added to NRHP: August 14, 1998
- Designated CP: March 24, 2016

The Berryville Post Office is a historic post office building at 101 East Madison Avenue in Berryville, Arkansas. It is a single-story brick Colonial Revival structure, topped by a hip roof and cupola with finial. It was designed by Louis A. Simon and built in 1938–39. Although primarily intended to serve the needs of the United States Postal Service, the basement housed offices of various county agents. The building is primarily notable for the plaster sculpture above the postmaster's office, which was created in 1940 by Daniel Gillette Olney as part of the Treasury Department's Section of Fine Arts, a jobs program for artists.

The building was listed on the National Register of Historic Places in 1998.

== See also ==
- National Register of Historic Places listings in Carroll County, Arkansas
- List of United States post offices
- List of New Deal sculpture
