= Blue Spring Heritage Center =

Archaeological site in Arkansas, United States

- U.S. National Register of Historic Places
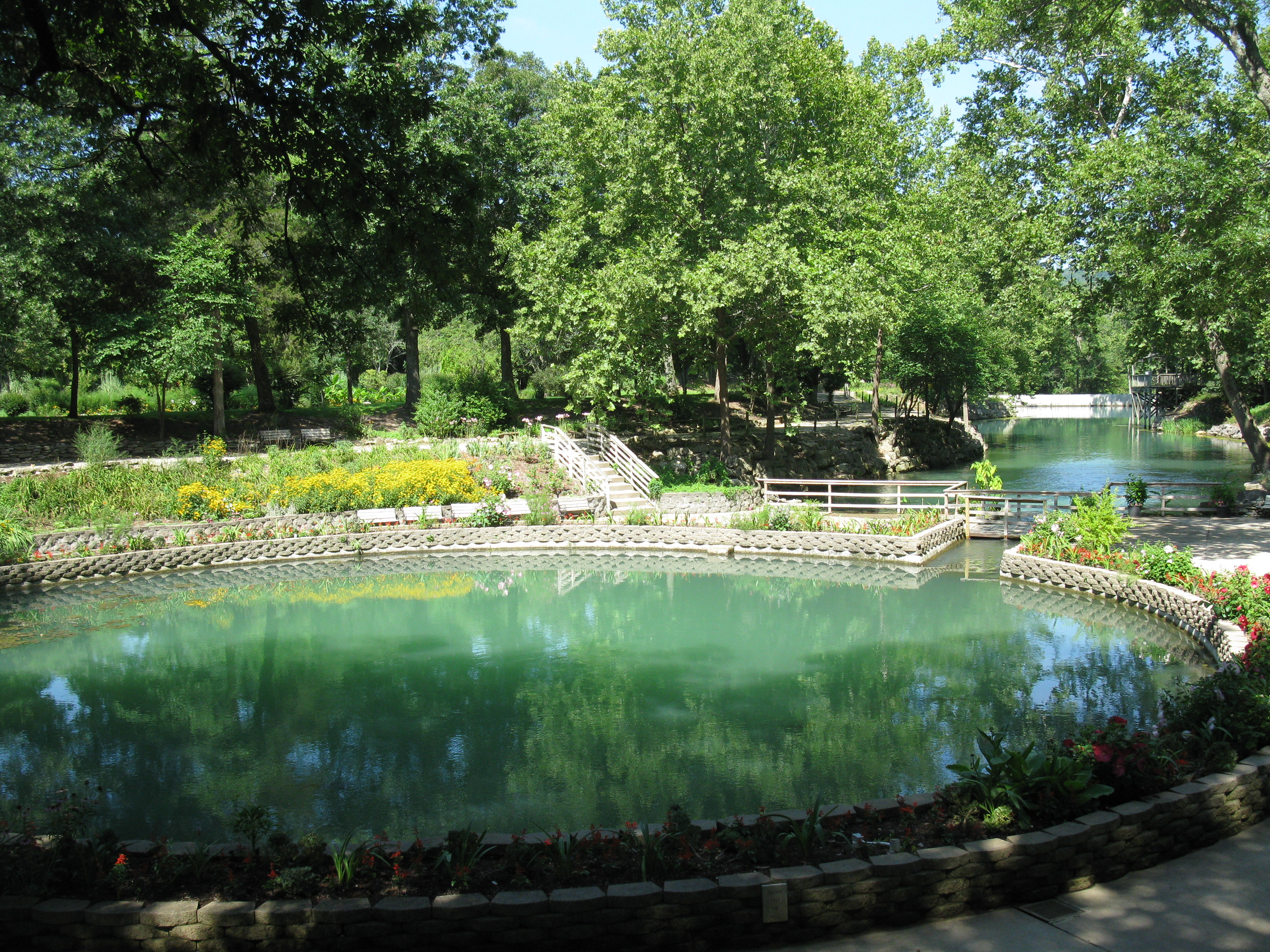
- The Blue Spring

- Location within Arkansas Location within the United States
- Nearest city: Eureka Springs, Arkansas
- Coordinates: 36°24′10″N 93°44′11″W
- Area: 0.5 acres (0.20 ha)
- Website: bluespringheritage.com
- NRHP reference No.: 02001596
- Added to NRHP: December 20, 2002

Blue Spring Heritage Center (formerly known as Eureka Springs Gardens) is a 33-acre (13 ha) privately owned tourist attraction in the Arkansas Heritage Trails System containing native plants and hardwood trees in a setting of woodlands, meadows, and hillsides. It is located at Highway 62 West, five miles (8 km) west of Eureka Springs, Arkansas, and open daily to the public during warmer months for a fee.

The spring pours 38 million US gallons (140,000 m³) of water daily into the trout-filled lagoon. Blue Spring has been a tourist attraction since 1948, and is now on the National Register of Historic Places for its archaeological significance as a site occupied between the Early Archaic and the Mississippian periods.

Historians from several Indian nations, including the Tsalagi (Cherokee), Osage and Quapaw, say their people have been making journeys to, and living intermittently at Blue Spring for tens of thousands of years. Artifacts excavated at the Blue Spring Shelter support this, as they date back to between 8000 B.C. and A.D. 1500.

== Blue Spring Shelter ==
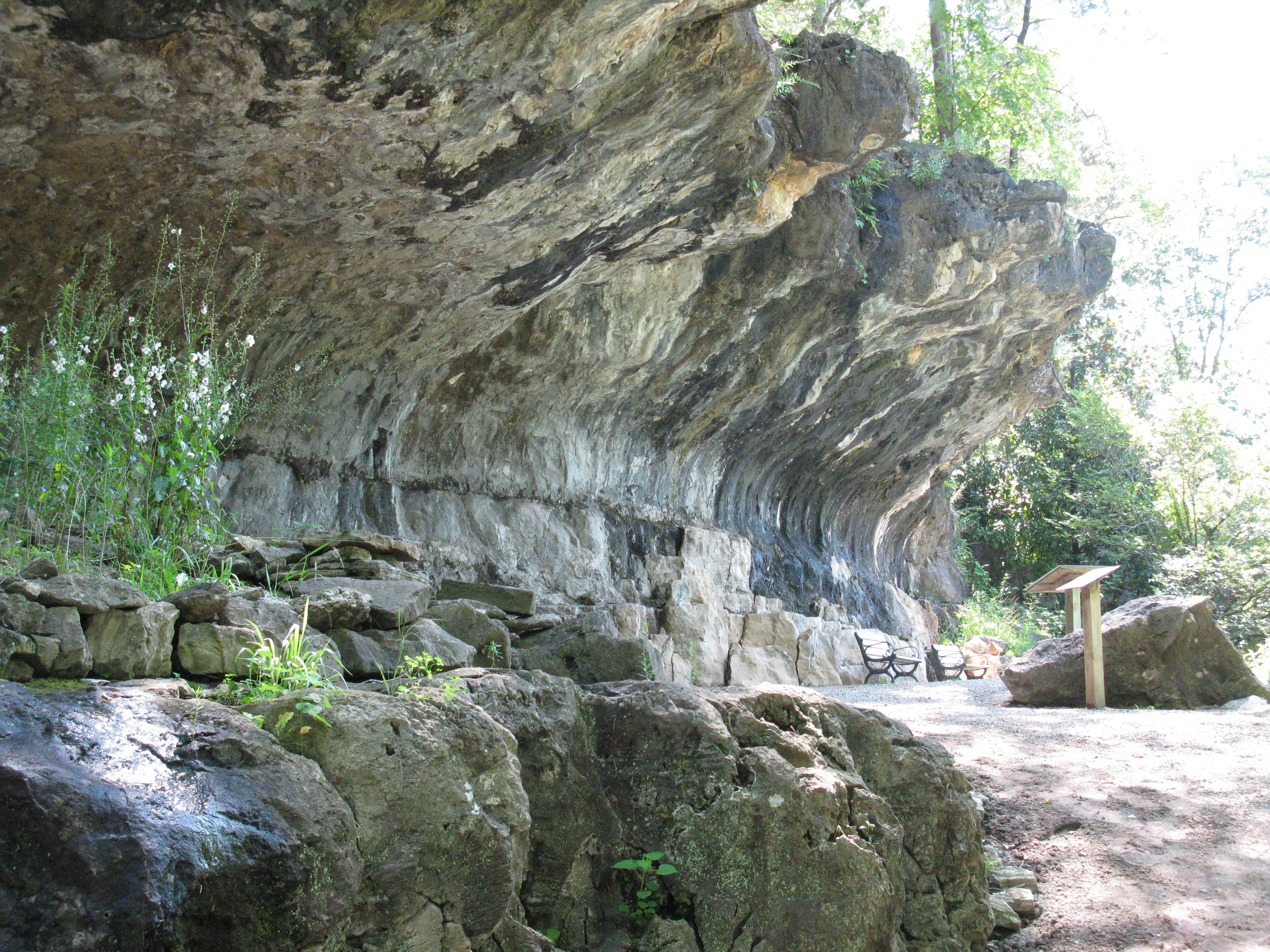
The Cliff Shelter at Blue Spring.

The American Indian people who lived here in ancient times (10,000 years ago and beyond to 500 B.C.) are known as the ‘Bluff Dwellers’. These indigenous people populated not only the Blue Spring area, but much of the Ozark Mountains. They lived beneath giant bluff shelters such as this one. As most human beings of their time, they hunted, gathered, and planted. Tools, clothes and many other necessary items were made from many native plants and animals available to them. They also traded goods with other Indian nations.

Indigenous people who lived here between 500 B.C. and A.D. 900 continued to hunt, gather, plant and trade, though planting gardens had become a more prominent activity. With over 62% of the world's food having been developed by American Indians, it is no surprise that the Indians of the Ozarks domesticated maygrass, lamb's quarter, knotweek, sumpweek, sunflower, squash, and strains of little barley. The bottomlands and terraces of the White River provided fertile garden spots for the indigenous occupants of the Blue Spring Shelter.

From A.D. 900 to A.D. 1541, agriculture had become an integral part of many Indian communities in the Ozarks and Arkansas area. They depended mostly on maize, squash and beans. As always, hunting, gathering and trading remained an important part of society. The Blue Spring Shelter continued to be used by Indian people for short and long term camps, and for ceremony.

In recent history (1541 to present), Tsalagi (Cherokee) people made a stop at Blue Spring on the “Trail of Tears” during the late 1830s. Indian people continue to spend time at Blue Spring and Blue Spring Shelter. Today, visits and ceremonies by Indian people such as Lenape, Musogee, Cherokee, and Lakota take place at the Blue Spring Shelter regularly. It remains a place of peace, healing, and connection.

== See also ==
- List of botanical gardens in the United States
- National Register of Historic Places listings in Carroll County, Arkansas
