= U.S. Route 412 =

Highway in the Southern United States

U.S. Route 412
- US 412 highlighted in red

Route information
- Length: 1,130 mi (1,820 km)
- Existed: 1982 (extended east in 1984, 1989, west in 1989, 1994)–present

Major junctions
- West end: US 56 / NM 21 at Springer, NM
- I-35 near Enid, OK; I-44 at Tulsa, OK; I-49 / US 62 / US 71 at Springdale, AR; I-55 / US 61 at Hayti, MO; I-155 / US 51 at Dyersburg, TN; I-40 at Jackson, TN
- East end: I-65 / SR 99 at Columbia, TN

Location
- Country: United States
- States: New Mexico, Oklahoma, Arkansas, Missouri, Tennessee

Highway system
- United States Numbered Highway System; List; Special; Divided
- New Mexico State Highway System; Interstate; US; State; Scenic
← US 400	→ US 425
← NM 411	NM	→ NM 412

U.S. Route 412 is an east–west United States highway, first commissioned in 1982. U.S. 412 overlaps expressway-grade Cimarron Turnpike from Tulsa west to Interstate 35 and the Cherokee Turnpike from 5 miles (8.0 km) east of Chouteau, Oklahoma, to 8 miles (13 km) west of the Arkansas state line. It runs the entire length of the Oklahoma Panhandle and traverses the Missouri Bootheel.

As of 2020, the highway's eastern terminus is in Columbia, Tennessee at an intersection with Interstate 65, where it continues east as State Route 99. Its western terminus is in Springer, New Mexico at an intersection with Interstate 25.

== Route description ==
US 412 overlaps with U.S. 43, U.S. 56, US 60, U.S. 62, U.S. 63, U.S. 64, U.S. 65, I-155, and U.S. 270, runs parallel to U.S. 62 and U.S. 64 in various places and intersects U.S. 70. Although its numbering suggests that it is a spur of U.S. 12, it does not intersect that route at all.

=== New Mexico ===
The highway begins at mile marker 412 of Interstate 25 in Springer. It is concurrent with U.S. Route 56 throughout its entire route in the state at just under 100 miles (160 km). Besides Springer, the only other town Route 412 passes through is Clayton, where it merges with U.S. Route 64. Just before entering Oklahoma, the highway touches the northwestern corner of Texas at a small road junction.

=== Oklahoma ===
Highway 412 runs across the Panhandle and northern part of the state passing through cities such as Boise City, Woodward, Enid, and Tulsa. Some major highway junctions include Interstate 35 in Noble County and several others in Tulsa such as I-44, 244, 444, and U.S. Routes 75 and 169. Two sections of this highway are tolled: the Cimarron Turnpike (from I-35 to the western outskirts of Tulsa), and the Cherokee Turnpike (from near Chouteau to about 10 miles (16 km) west of the Arkansas border).

=== Arkansas ===
The Arkansas section starts at the Oklahoma line, runs through the scenic Ozark Mountains in the northern part of Arkansas, and leaves the state at the Missouri Bootheel. Cities along the route include Siloam Springs, Springdale, Alpena, Harrison, Cotter, Mountain Home, Salem, Walnut Ridge, and Paragould. In Harrison, U.S. Route 412 is concurrent with both US 62 and US 65.

==== Northwest Arkansas ====
In the state's northwest corner, the route enters Arkansas. In Benton County, the route serves Siloam Springs as a major route through the southern part of the city. US 412 has a concurrency with Highway 59 that ends in east Siloam Springs. US 412 becomes four-lane and runs east to enter Washington County. The route enters Tontitown, passes the historic Tontitown School Building, and intersects Highway 112 before entering Springdale.

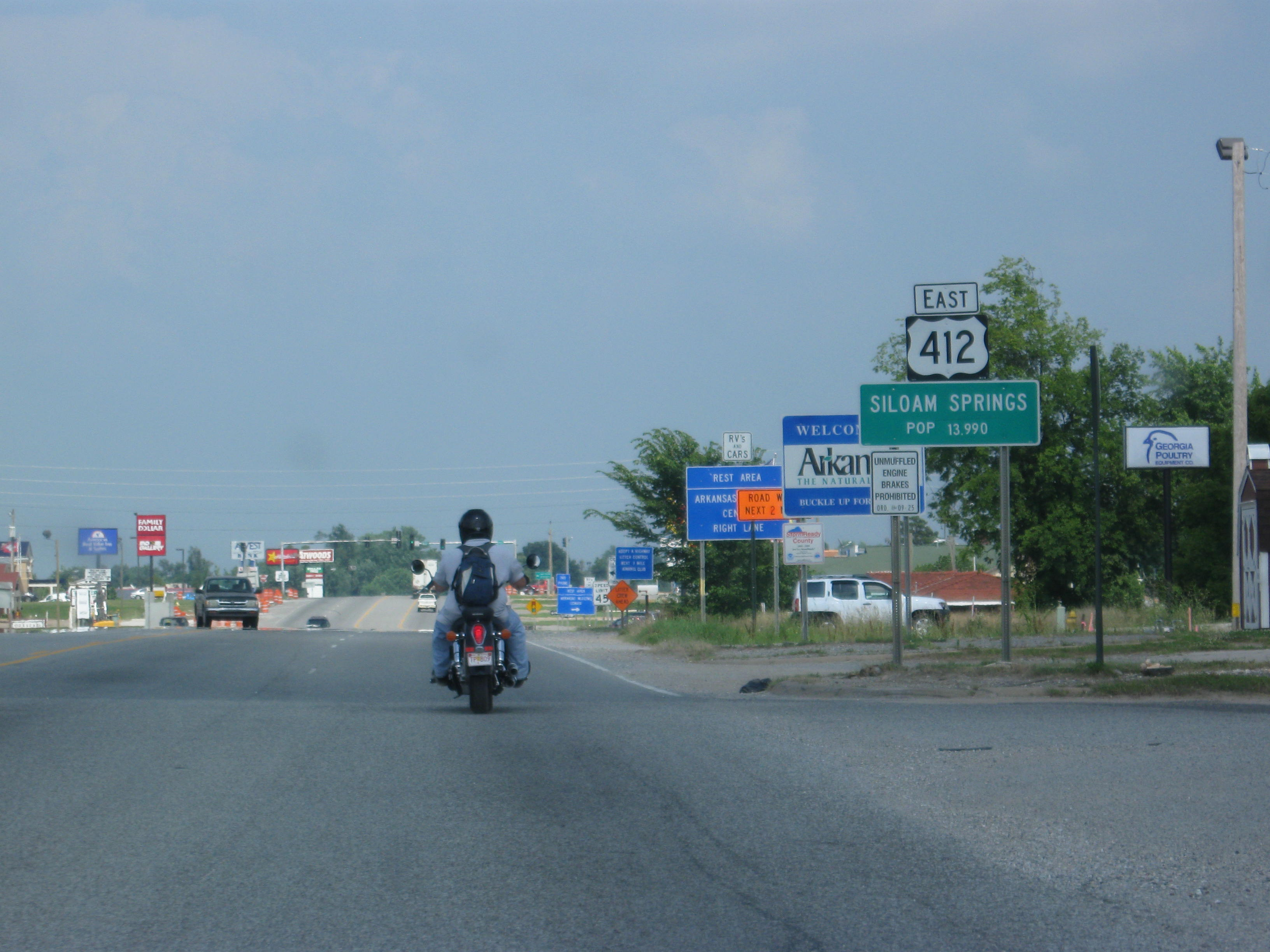
U.S. 412 as it enters Arkansas in Siloam Springs.

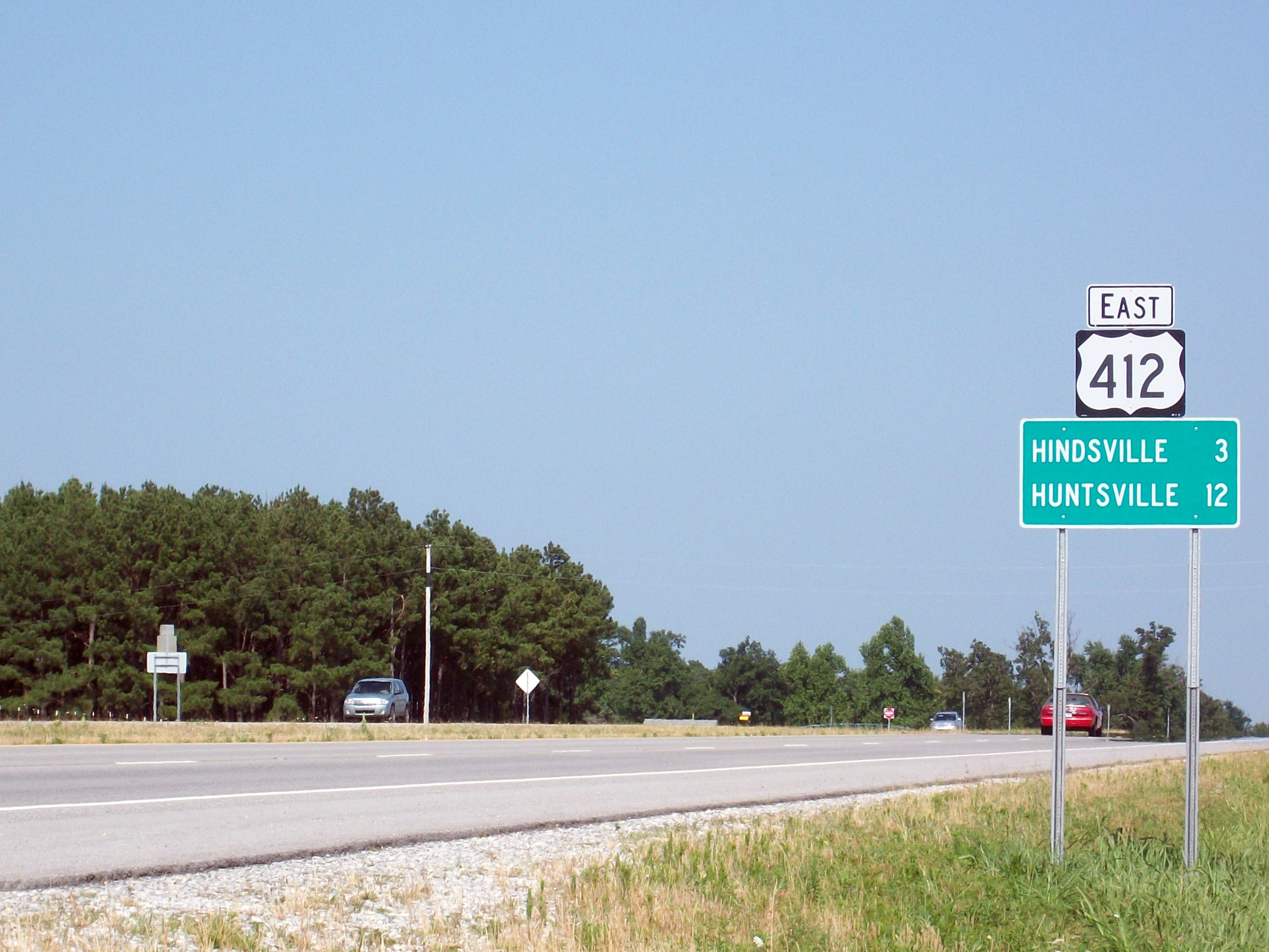
US 412 near Hindsville, Arkansas.

US 412 crosses I-49/US 62/US 71 in Springdale, where the route is four-lane with a center left-turn lane. Now named Sunset Avenue, the route passes through developed parts of Springdale, including many restaurants, hotels, and businesses before turning south, forming a concurrency with US 71B. The concurrency ends and US 412 heads east past the Springdale Municipal Airport and Highway 265 out of town. Again becoming four-lane divided, the route winds east to Hindsville.

The route nears Hindsville, including an intersection with a former alignment now designated US 412B. The community was bypassed in 2009 with a four-lane alignment of US 412. US 412 continues east, winding through forested land. Near Huntsville, the highway intersects another business route and Highway 23 before entering Carroll County.

==== Concurrencies with US 62 and US 63 ====
The highway has a brief overlap with Highway 21 in the southwest corner of the county, and has junctions with many rural routes in Carroll County. The highway passes the James C. Chaney House and Stamps Store in Osage, the Dog Branch School, and the Yell Masonic Lodge Hall in Carrollton. In Alpena, US 412 begins a concurrency with US 62. This overlap is approximately 150 miles (240 km) through many north central Arkansas communities, including Harrison, Cotter, Mountain Home, Ash Flat, and Hardy. In Imboden, US 412 breaks from US 62 north, now concurrent with US 63 until an interchange at I-57/US-67. Its former alignment near Portia now runs due east to downtown Walnut Ridge.

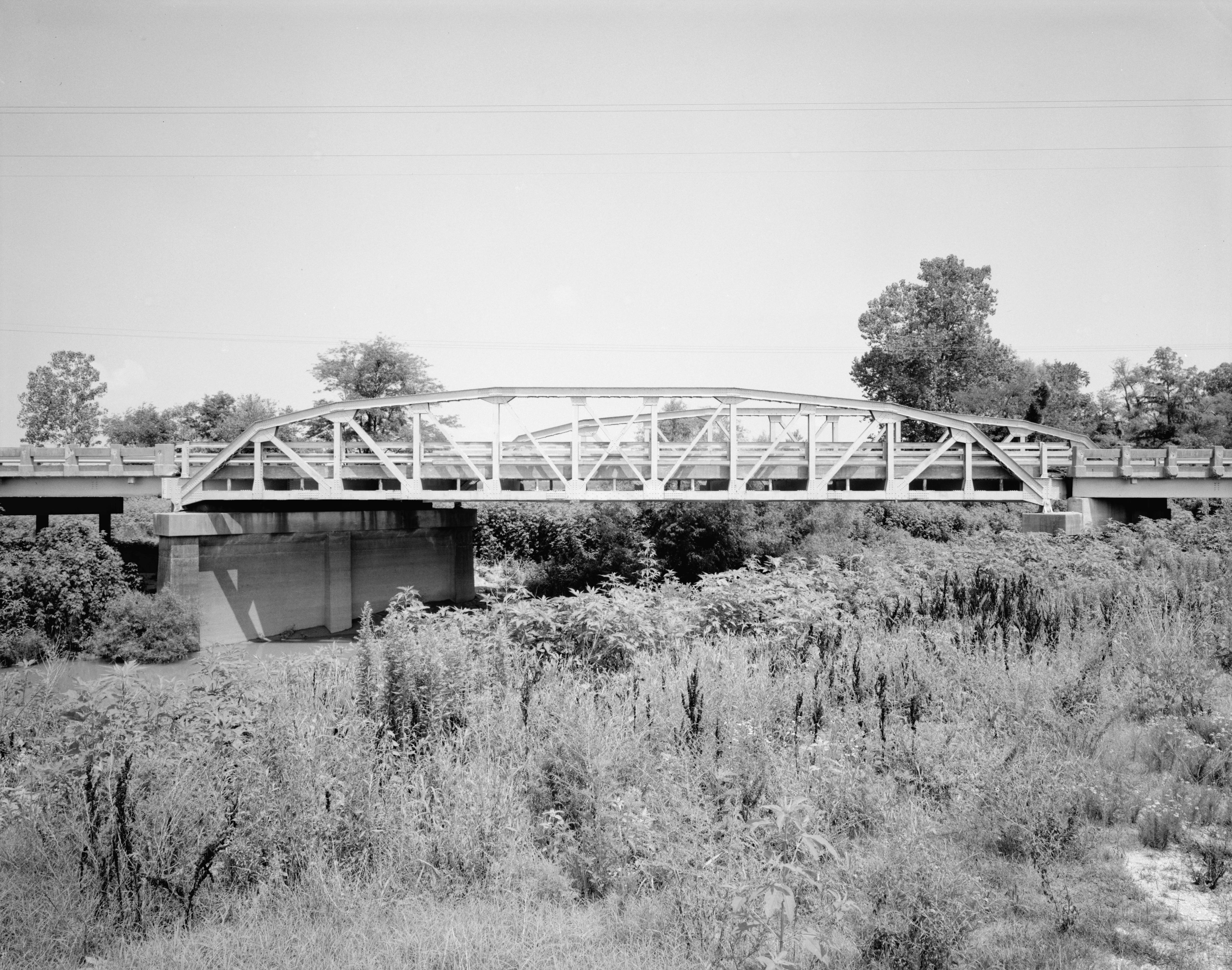
This 1934 Parker pony truss bridge formerly carried US 412 over the Cache River, but was rated structurally deficient in 1991 and was bypassed in 1995. The main span remains intact.

==== Northeast Arkansas ====
After the concurrency ends, US 412 exits the road before crossing the Cache River and entering Greene County. Historically, the route passed over the water on the Cache River Bridge, but the 1934 Parker pony truss bridge was bypassed in 1995. The highway runs due east, intersecting Highway 228 (in which was upgraded to a 4 lane which its former alignment goes through Light), Highway 141, and Highway 168 (which gives access to Crowley's Ridge State Park) before Paragould. bypassing the city, US 412 Business runs as Kings Hwy in Paragould. The New route continues toward Highway 358, US 49 and Highway 69. After the bypass ends near Highway 135 in the city limits, The route continues east across the St. Francis River, entering Missouri.

=== Missouri ===
U.S. 412 crosses the Missouri Bootheel, and runs concurrent with Interstate 155 east of Hayti to the Tennessee state line.

=== Tennessee ===
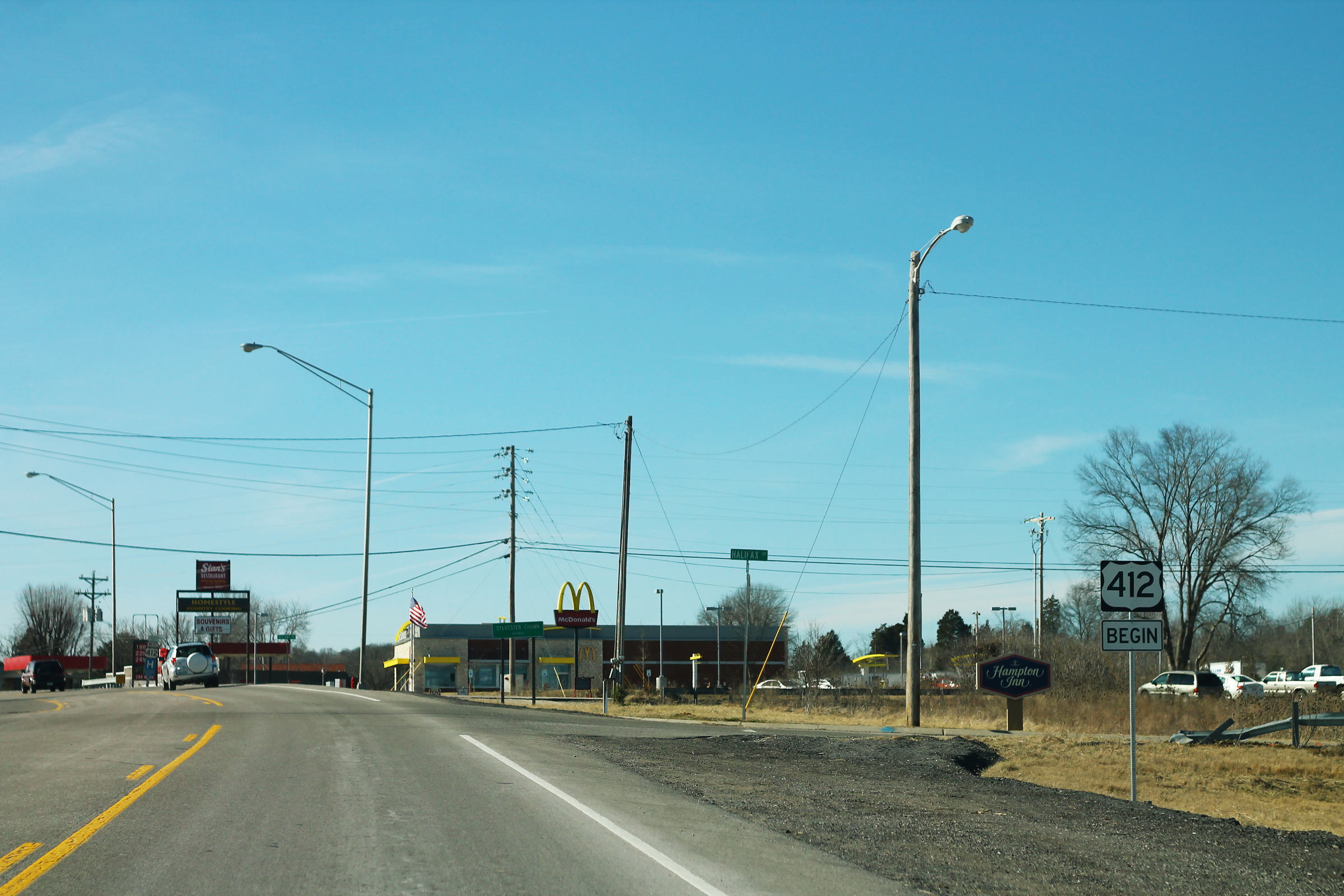
Beginning of westbound US 412 in Columbia, Tennessee.

Still concurrent with I-155, US 412 enters Tennessee from Missouri on the Caruthersville Bridge before meeting US 51 in Dyersburg. The interstate designation ends as 412 turns southeast toward Jackson on a stretch of highway that was upgraded from 2 to 4 lanes in the 1990s. After leaving Jackson on its eastern side, US 412 passes through the towns of Lexington, Parsons, and Hohenwald before reaching Columbia. The section from Hohenwald eastward to I-65 near Columbia is overlapped with unsigned State Route 99. East of I-65 at the eastern terminus of US 412, the route remains SR 99.

== History ==
Arkansas Highway 68 is the former designation of U.S. Highway 412 from the Arkansas-Oklahoma State Line to U.S. Highway 62 at Alpena. The original eastern terminus of Highway 68 was 10 miles (16 km) east of Huntsville at Highway 21, but was extended in the 1940s to Alpena.

An old alignment of Highway 68 can be found 4 miles (6.4 km) east of Huntsville. This section includes an open-spandrel arch bridge over War Eagle Creek.

Just east of Mountain Home, in Henderson, the highway crosses Lake Norfork, which at one time had to be crossed by ferry. Coinciding with the final trip of a Norfork Lake ferry at 8 a.m. Friday, October 14, 1983, the U.S. Highway 62 bridge across Lake Norfork was opened. Charles Gibson piloted the ferry on that trip, carrying three cars across the lake within the shadow of the bridge, which brought a 40-year era to an end.

== Future ==
Future Interstate 42
- Location: Interstate 35, OK–Tontitown, AR
- Length: 191 mi (307 km)

On May 20, 2021, Senator Jim Inhofe, Republican of Oklahoma, introduced legislation to designate the portion of US-412 between I-35 in Noble County, Oklahoma and I-49 in Springdale, Arkansas as a future Interstate. The bill, titled the "Future Interstate in Oklahoma and Arkansas Act" (S. 1766), was cosponsored by senators John Boozman and Tom Cotton, both Republicans of Arkansas. The senators' stated reasons for seeking an Interstate designation along the US-412 corridor included encouraging economic development, expanding opportunities for employment in the region, making travel safer and shipping easier, attracting new businesses, and better connecting rural and urban communities. Other supporters of the measure include the mayor of Tulsa, G. T. Bynum, and the heads of both the Oklahoma Department of Transportation (ODOT) and the Arkansas Department of Transportation (ArDOT). In October 2023, officials from both states requested public feedback on the US 412 study area, which is approximately 190 mi (310 km) long. Interstate 42 (I-42) was the proposed designation but was withdrawn. ArDOT and ODOT later resubmitted the application to the Spring 2024 meeting; AASHTO approved the route as Interstate 42, conditional on it being upgraded to Interstate standards.

== Major intersections ==
New Mexico
NM 21 in Springer
US 56 in Springer. The highways travel concurrently to east-northeast of Boise City, Oklahoma.
US 64 / US 87 in Clayton. US 64/US 412 travels concurrently to Guymon, Oklahoma.
Oklahoma
US 385 south-southwest of Boise City. The highways travel concurrently to Boise City.
US 287 east of Boise City
US 54 in Guymon. The highways travel concurrently through Guymon.
US 83 in Bryans Corner
US 270 in Elmwood. The highways travel concurrently to Woodward.
US 283 south-southeast of Laverne
US 183 west-northwest of Fort Supply. The highways travel concurrently to Woodward.
US 281 south of Waynoka
US 60 in Orienta. The highways travel concurrently to Enid.
US 60 / US 81 in Enid
US 64 in Enid. The highways travel concurrently to north-northwest of Perry.
I-35 / US 64 north-northwest of Perry
US 77 north of Perry
US 177 north-northwest of Morrison
US 64 east of Morrison
US 64 in Westport. The highways travel concurrently to Tulsa.
I-244 / US 64 in Tulsa. I-244/US 412 travels concurrently through Tulsa.
I-444 / US 75 in Tulsa
US 169 in Tulsa
I-44 / I-244 in Tulsa. I-44/US 412 travels concurrently to the Tulsa–Fair Oaks line.
US 69 in Chouteau
US 59 in Kansas. The highways travel concurrently to West Siloam Springs.
Arkansas
I-42 in Tontitown
I-49 / US 62 / US 71 in Springdale
US 62 in Alpena. The highways travel concurrently to Imboden.
US 65 in Bear Creek Springs. The highways travel concurrently to Bellefonte.
US 167 in Ash Flat
US 63 in Hardy. The highways travel concurrently to Hoxie.
I-57 / US 67 in Walnut Ridge
US 49 in Paragould
Missouri
I-55 / I-155 / US 61 in Hayti. I-155/US 412 travels concurrently to Dyersburg, Tennessee.
Tennessee
Future I-69 / I-155 / US 51 in Dyersburg. US 51/US 412 travels concurrently through Dyersburg.
US 79 northeast of Bells
I-40 in Jackson. The highways travel concurrently to northeast of Jackson.
US 45 in Jackson
I-40 / US 70 northeast of Jackson. US 70/US 412 travels concurrently for approximately 0.3 miles (0.48 km).
US 43 in Columbia. The highways travel concurrently to .
US 31 / US 43 in Columbia
I-65 in Columbia
SR 99 in Columbia

== See also ==
- U.S. Route 400
- U.S. Route 425

=== Special and suffixed routes ===
- U.S. Route 412B in Hindsville, Arkansas
- U.S. Route 412B in Huntsville, Arkansas
- U.S. Route 412B in Walnut Ridge, Arkansas
- U.S. Route 412B in Light, Arkansas
- U.S. Route 412B in Paragould, Arkansas
- U.S. Route 412 Business in Jackson, Tennessee
- U.S. Route 412 Business in Columbia, Tennessee
- U.S. Route 412 Alternate in Oklahoma
