= Berryville Agriculture Building =

- U.S. National Register of Historic Places
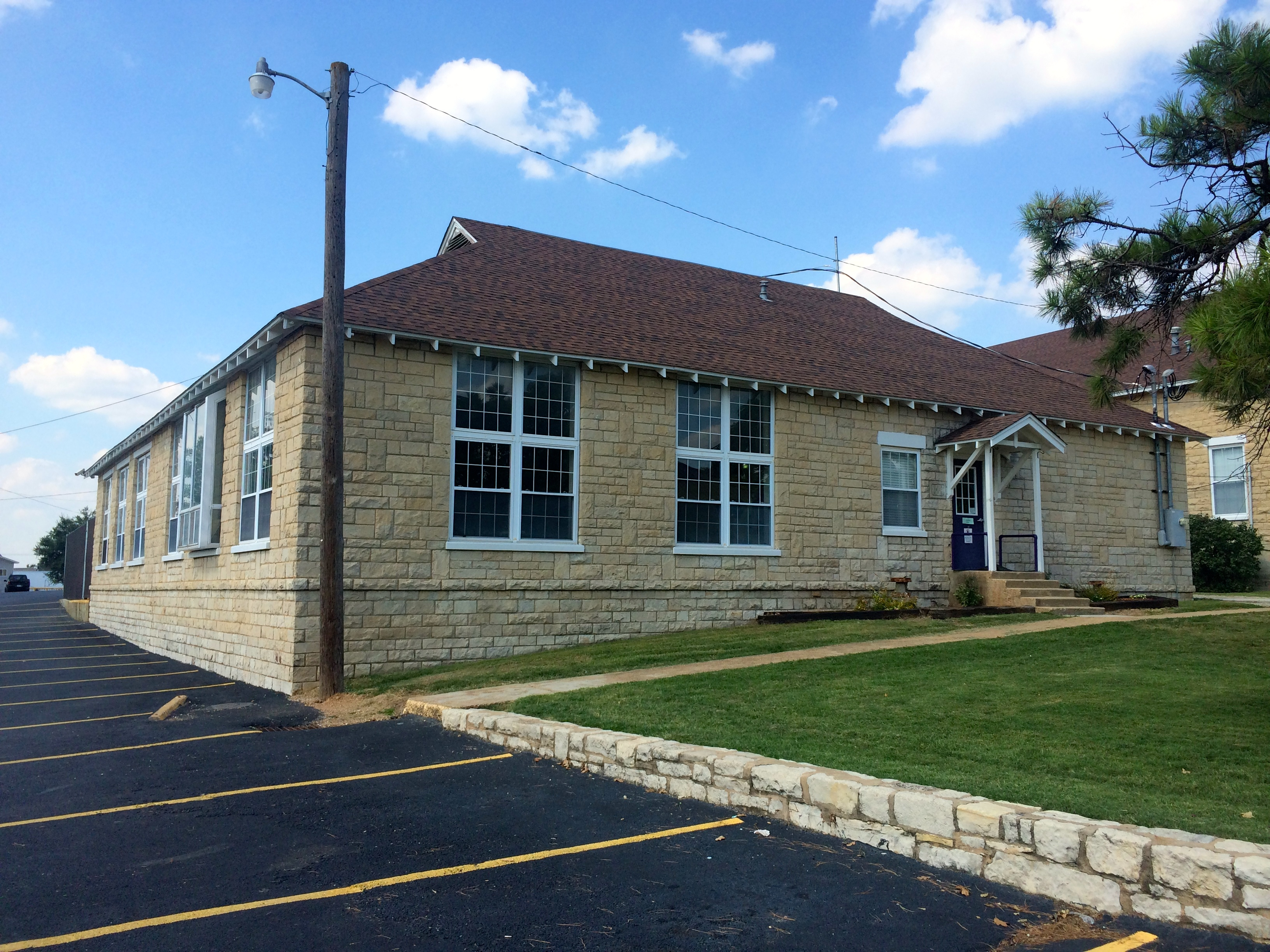

- Location within Arkansas Location within the United States
- Location: S of Freeman Ave., E of Linda St., N of W. College Ave. and W of Ferguson St., Berryville, Arkansas
- Coordinates: 36°22′7″N 93°34′33″W
- Area: less than one acre
- Architect: Dave Thorn
- Architectural style: Bungalow/craftsman, Plain Traditional
- MPS: Public Schools in the Ozarks MPS
- NRHP reference No.: 92001214
- Added to NRHP: September 10, 1992

The Berryville Agriculture Building is a historic school building, located in a large school complex on the west side of Berryville, Arkansas. It is an L-shaped stone Plain Traditional structure, built in 1940 pursuant to the terms of the Smith–Hughes Act providing for a vocational agricultural teaching environment. The main facade faces east, with the entrance off-center to the north, sheltered by a gabled porch hood. A single window is located on the wall further south.

The building was listed on the National Register of Historic Places in 1992.

== See also ==
- National Register of Historic Places listings in Carroll County, Arkansas
