= Stamps Store =

- U.S. National Register of Historic Places
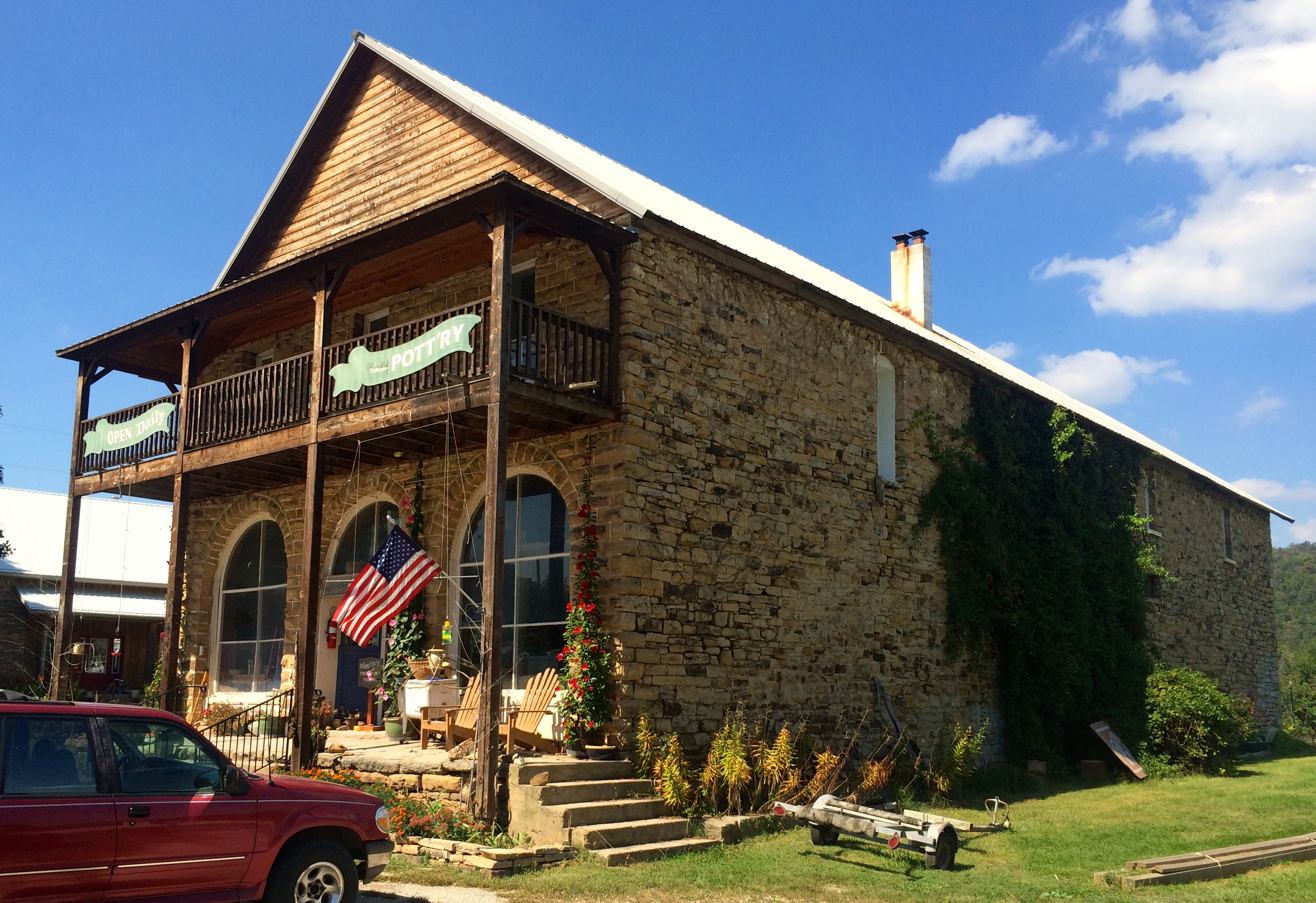

- Location within Arkansas Location within the United States
- Location: AR 103, Osage, Arkansas
- Coordinates: 36°10′58″N 93°24′16″W
- Area: less than one acre
- Architectural style: Rubble Romanesque
- NRHP reference No.: 90001380
- Added to NRHP: September 5, 1990

The Stamps Store is a historic commercial building on Arkansas Highway 103 in Osage, Arkansas, a hamlet off United States Route 412 between Alpena and Huntsville. It is a 2 1/2-story stone structure, with a front-gable roof, and vernacular Romanesque Revival styling. The first floor was originally a large open retail space used as a general store, the second floor was a residential space for the proprietor, and the upper half-story was a meeting space. It was built 1899–1902 by Willie and Millie Sneed, and was operated by the Stamps family from 1912 to 1990. It was listed on the National Register of Historic Places in 1990 for its architecture and its historical importance to the small community.

== See also ==
- National Register of Historic Places listings in Carroll County, Arkansas
