= Berryville Gymnasium =

- U.S. National Register of Historic Places
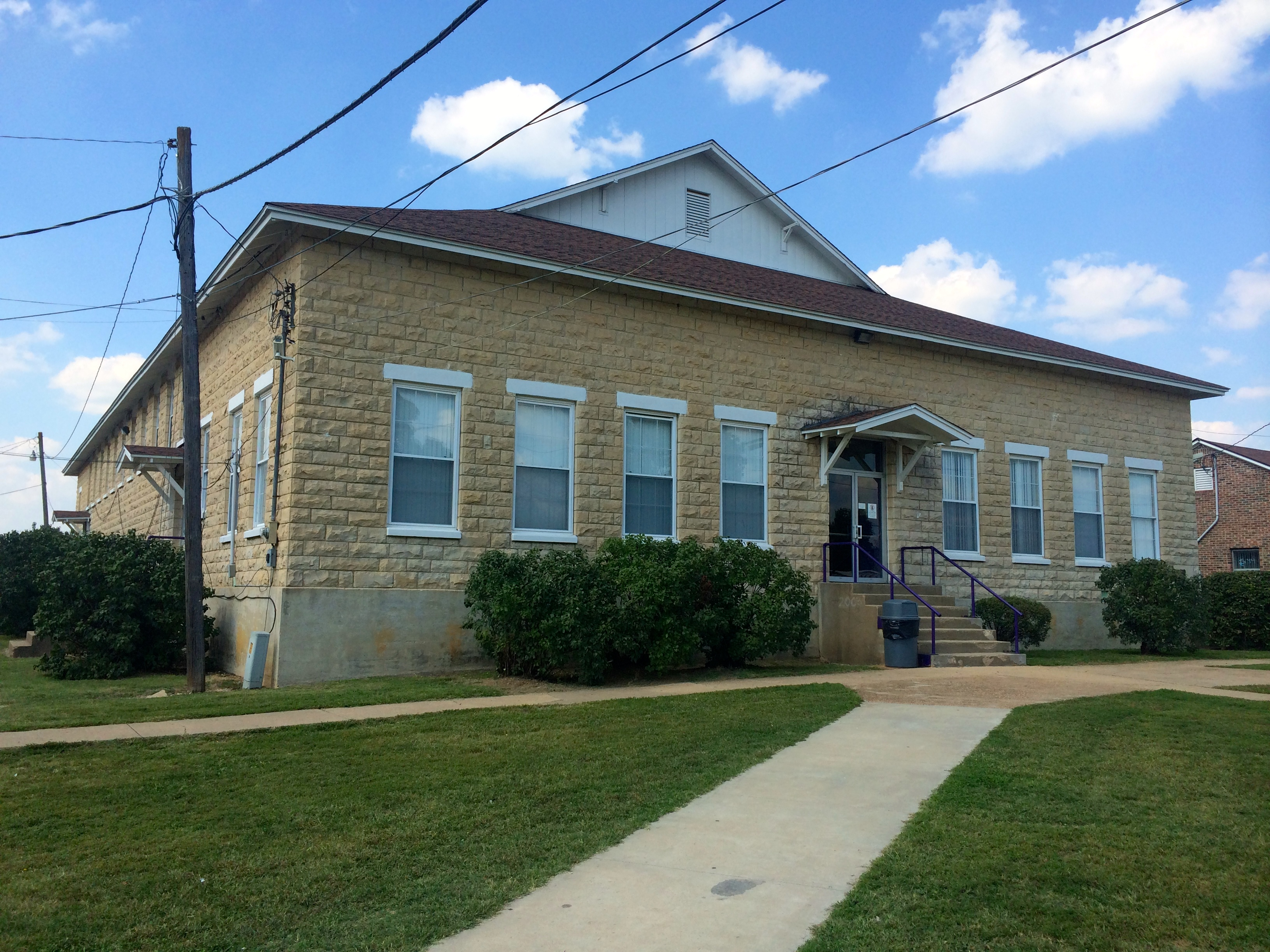

- Location within Arkansas Location within the United States
- Location: S. of Freeman Ave., E of Linda St., N of W. College Ave. and W of Ferguson St., Berryville, Arkansas
- Coordinates: 36°22′8″N 93°34′33″W
- Area: less than one acre
- Built by: Works Progress Administration
- Architectural style: Bungalow/craftsman, Plain Traditional
- MPS: Public Schools in the Ozarks MPS
- NRHP reference No.: 92001215
- Added to NRHP: September 10, 1992

The Berryville Gymnasium is a historic school building, located in a large school complex on the west side of Berryville, Arkansas. It is a single-story stone masonry structure, with a gable-on-hip roof. It is taller to accommodate the height of the gymnasium within, and has a second row of windows across some facades to provide added illumination into that facility. The building was constructed in 1936–37 with funding assistance from the Works Progress Administration.

The building was listed on the National Register of Historic Places in 1992.

== See also ==
- National Register of Historic Places listings in Carroll County, Arkansas
