= Quigley's Castle =

Historic house in Arkansas, United States

- U.S. National Register of Historic Places
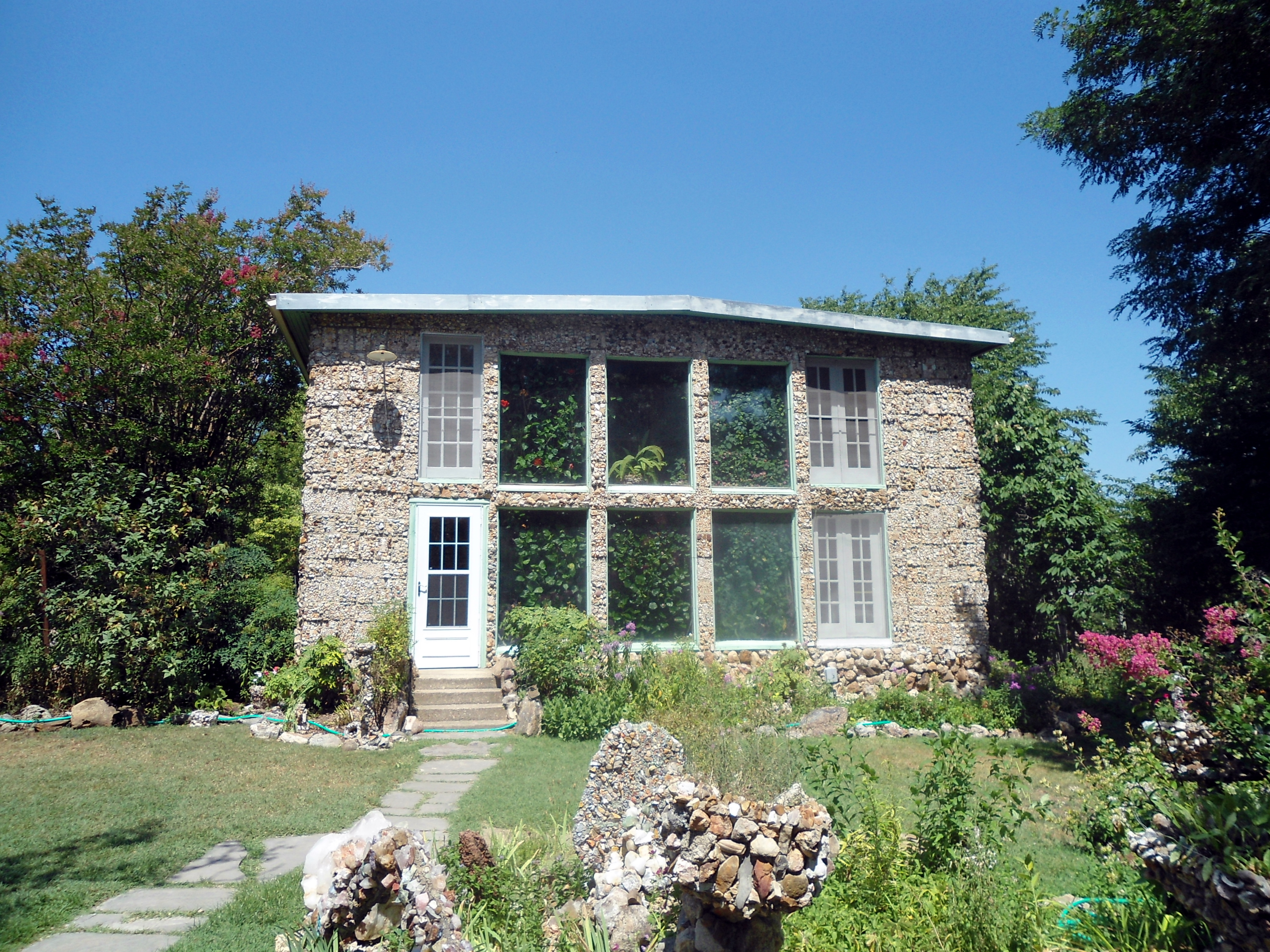

- Location within Arkansas Location within the United States
- Location: 274 Quigley Castle Road, Eureka Springs, Arkansas
- Coordinates: 36°20′46″N 93°45′21″W
- Area: 1.5 acres (0.61 ha)
- Built: 1943
- Architect: Quigley, Elise Fioravanti; Quigley, Albert Webster
- NRHP reference No.: 03000467
- Added to NRHP: May 30, 2003

Quigley's Castle is a historic house museum and garden at 274 Quigley Castle Road, off Arkansas Highway 23 south of Eureka Springs, Arkansas, and is one of the most unusual houses in northwestern Arkansas. The house was designed by Elise Quigley and built in 1943 by Albert Quigley and a neighbor, using lumber from the property. The exterior of the house is decorated with the collection of rocks Elise Quigley had accumulated since childhood. The house was specifically designed by Quigley to accommodate a two-story space for tropical plants. Over the years Elise Quigley's gardens expanded to take over much of the property. In 1950 the family began charging admission to tour the home, a practice that continues today.

The house was listed on the National Register of Historic Places in 2003.

== See also ==
- National Register of Historic Places listings in Carroll County, Arkansas
