= W.D. Crawford House =

Historic house in Arkansas, United States

- W. D. Crawford House
- U.S. National Register of Historic Places
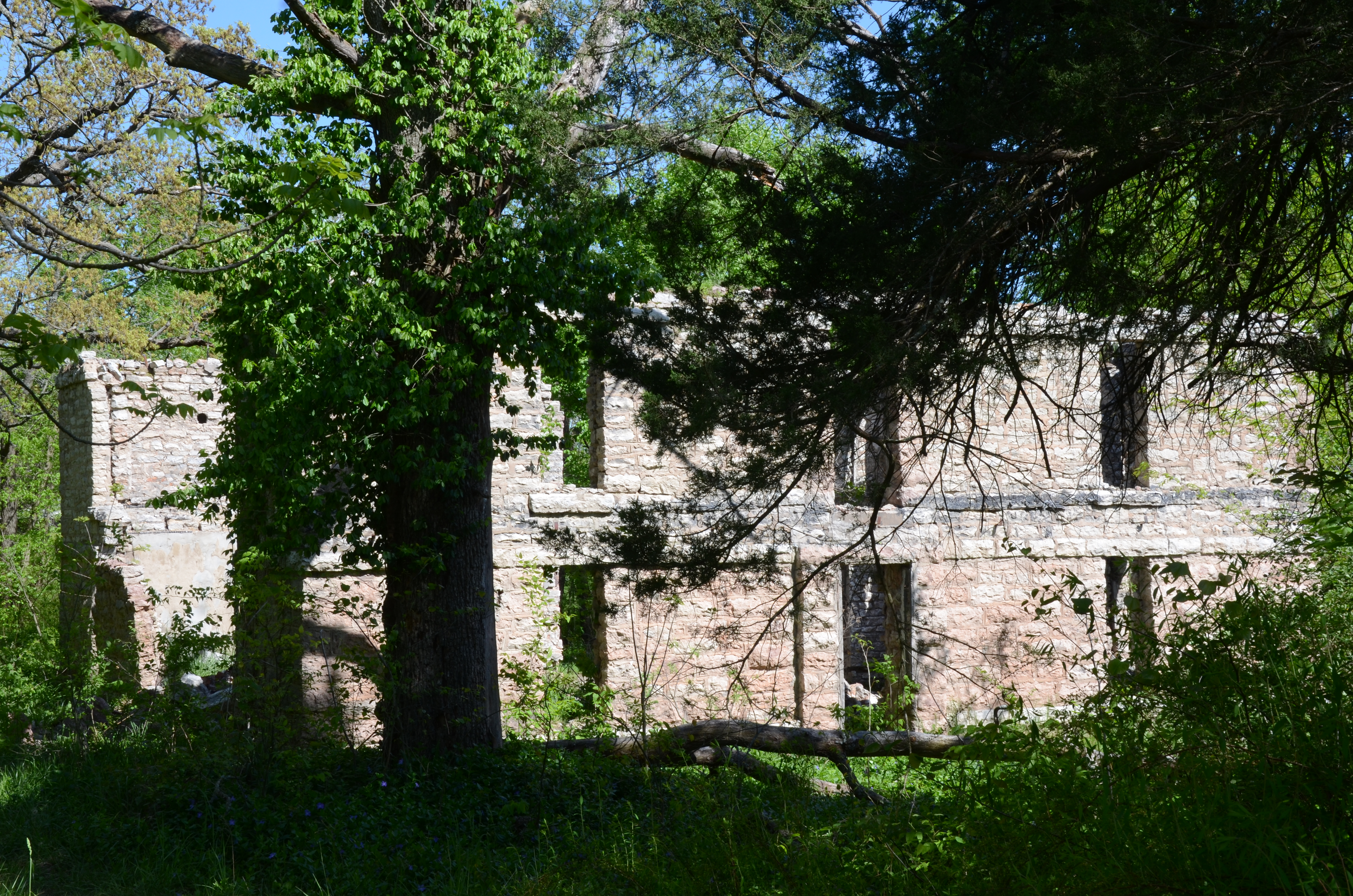

- Location within Arkansas Location within the United States
- Nearest city: Cisco, Arkansas
- Coordinates: 36°23′0″N 93°29′48″W
- Area: 7.3 acres (3.0 ha)
- Built: 1900
- Built by: Tillman Leach
- Architect: W.D. Crawford
- Architectural style: Plain Traditional
- NRHP reference No.: 92001613
- Added to NRHP: November 20, 1992

The W. D. Crawford House is a historic house in rural central Carroll County, Arkansas. It is located on the east side of County Road 643, east of Berryville, near the small rural community of Cisco. It is a two-story stone structure, with a hip roof that rises to a cupola at the peak. The house was built c. 1900 by W. D. Crawford, a graduate of the law school of the University of Arkansas at Fayetteville, who used the building as a home and school until 1904, when he founded the Ozark Normal School at Green Forest. Crawford would remain a constant presence in the educational systems of the region until his death in 1952.

The house was listed on the National Register of Historic Places in 1992.

== See also ==
- National Register of Historic Places listings in Carroll County, Arkansas
