= Tall Pines Motor Inn =

- Tall Pines Inn
- U.S. National Register of Historic Places
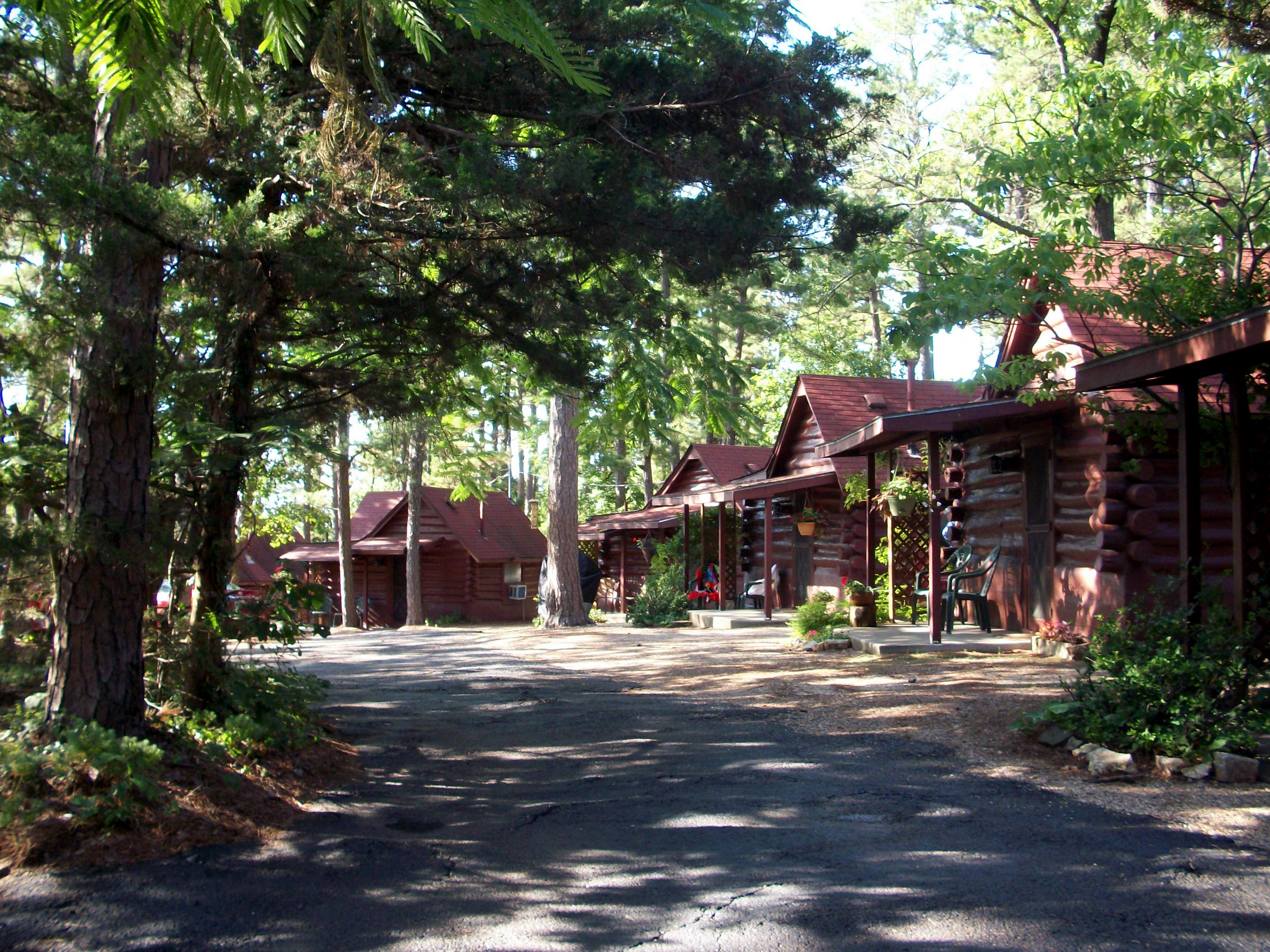
- Original Log Cabins Built in 1947

- Location within Arkansas Location within the United States
- Location: US 62, Eureka Springs, Arkansas
- Coordinates: 36°24′18″N 93°45′8″W
- Area: less than one acre
- Built: 1947
- Architectural style: Bungalow/Craftsman, Rustic
- NRHP reference No.: 98001603
- Added to NRHP: January 15, 1999

The Tall Pines Inn is a historic log cabin resort located at the junction of Pivot Rock Road and United States Route 62 in Eureka Springs, Arkansas. Established in 1947, it features six rustic cabins built from surrounding forests and modernized to meet the needs of today's traveler. Besides these cabins, which are of log construction, the inn has three suites which are part of the original log residence (formerly occupied by the innkeeper), twelve other cabins/suites with wood siding, and a swimming pool.

The Innkeeper's house and the six original log cabins were listed on the National Register of Historic Places in 1999, as an excellent local example of Rustic architecture.

== See also ==
- National Register of Historic Places listings in Carroll County, Arkansas
