= Green Forest Water Tower =

- U.S. National Register of Historic Places
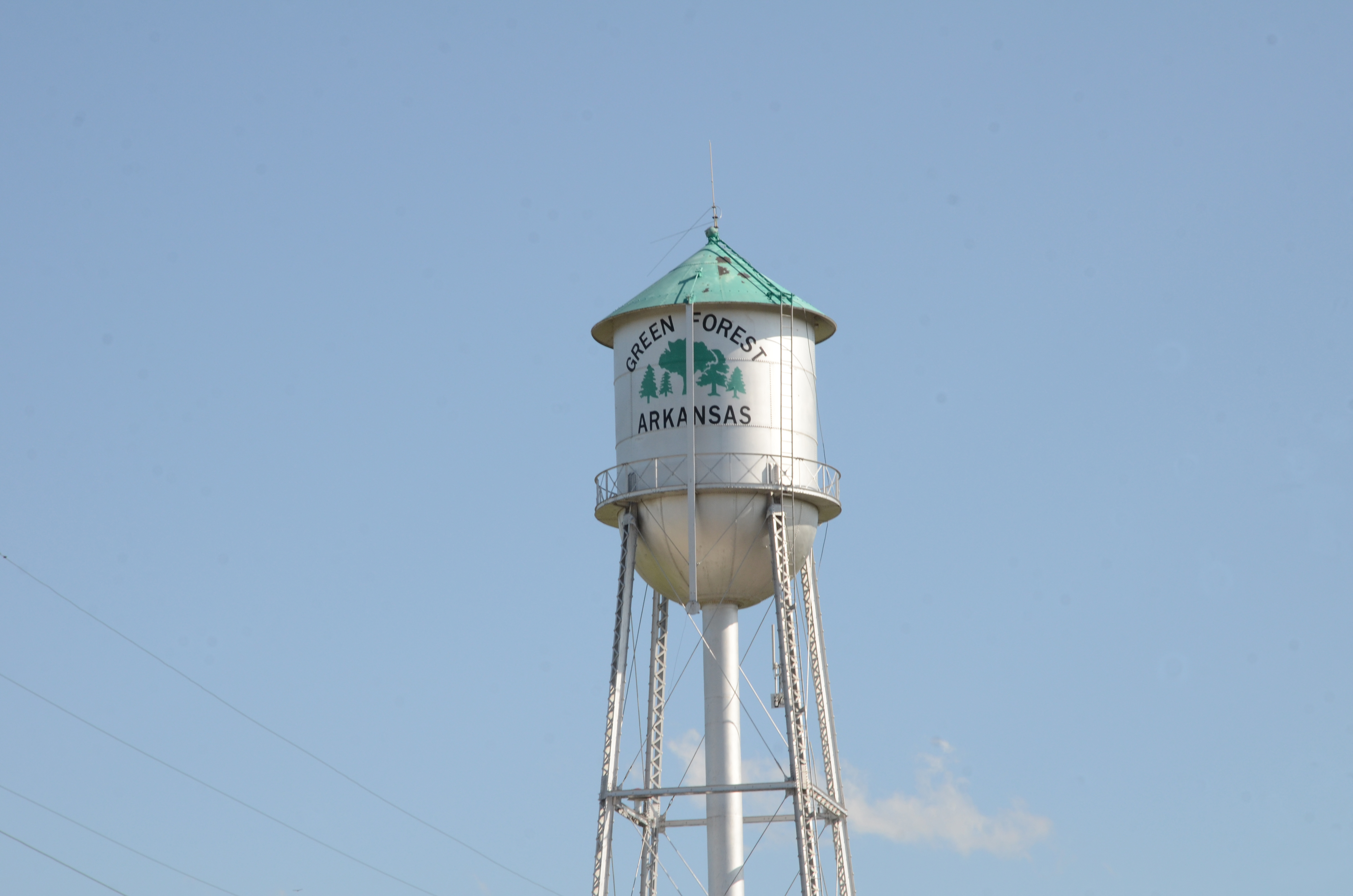

- Location within Arkansas Location within the United States
- Location: SE jct. of S. Springfield St. and E. Second St., Green Forest, Arkansas
- Coordinates: 36°20′4.3″N 93°26′8.7″W
- Area: less than one acre
- Built: 1937
- MPS: New Deal Recovery Efforts in Arkansas MPS
- NRHP reference No.: 07000470
- Added to NRHP: May 22, 2007

The Green Forest Water Tower is a historic water tower, located near the junction of South Springfield and East Second Streets in Green Forest, Arkansas. It consists of a metal supporting structure with four legs and cross bracing, supporting a water tank with a bowl-shaped bottom, with a water pipe in the center of the structure connecting the tank to the water system. The tank was built in 1937 by the Chicago Bridge and Iron Works Company with funding from the Public Works Administration. It is the only known surviving PWA-funded tower in Carroll County.

The tower was listed on the National Register of Historic Places in 2007.

== See also ==
- National Register of Historic Places listings in Carroll County, Arkansas
