= Lake Leatherwood Park =

- Lake Leatherwood Park Historic District
- U.S. National Register of Historic Places
- U.S. Historic district
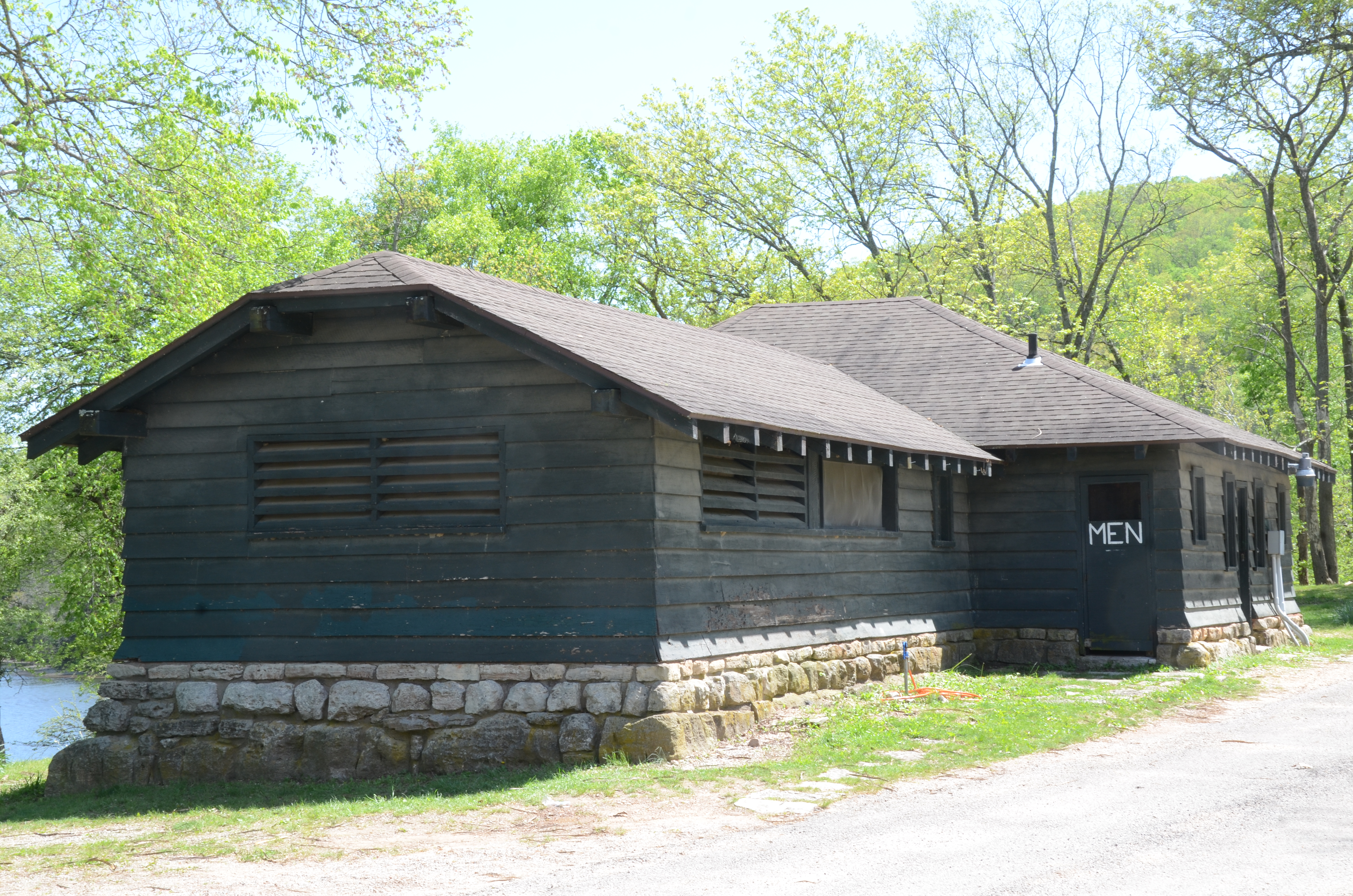
- Office and restroom building

- Location within Arkansas Location within the United States
- Location: Bet. US 62 and AR 23 at Leatherwood L., Eureka Springs, Arkansas
- Area: 1,600 acres (650 ha)
- Built: 1942; 84 years ago
- Architectural style: Colonial Revival, rustic
- MPS: Facilities Constructed by the CCC in Arkansas MPS
- NRHP reference No.: 98001346
- Added to NRHP: November 24, 1998

Lake Leatherwood Park is a municipal park on the north side of Eureka Springs, Arkansas. The park covers 1,600 acres (650 ha), and its centerpiece is Lake Leatherwood, a 100-acre (40 ha) body of water created by the Lake Leatherwood Dam, which impounds West Leatherwood Creek. The dam, along with roadways, recreational facilities, and other elements of the park, were built in the 1930s by work crews of the Civilian Conservation Corps (CCC) with funding from the federal government's Soil Conservation Service.

The park is the subject of several listings on the National Register of Historic Places. Those recreational facilities built by the CCC in the 1930s were listed in 1992; the dam was also nominated at that time, but it was never formally listed, and its listing is recorded by the National Park Service as pending. The entire park was listed as a historic district in 1998.

== Images ==
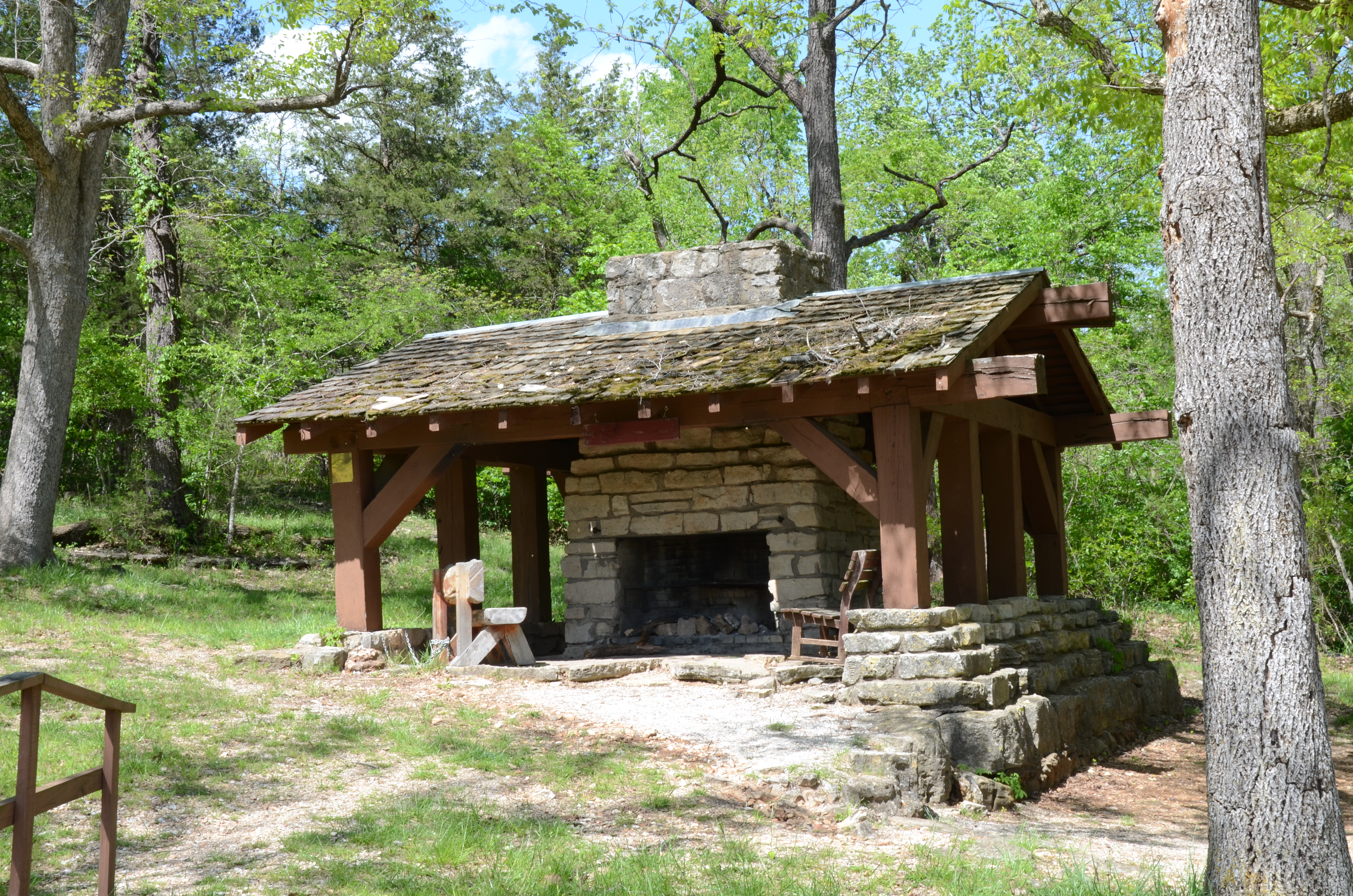
Outdoor fireplace

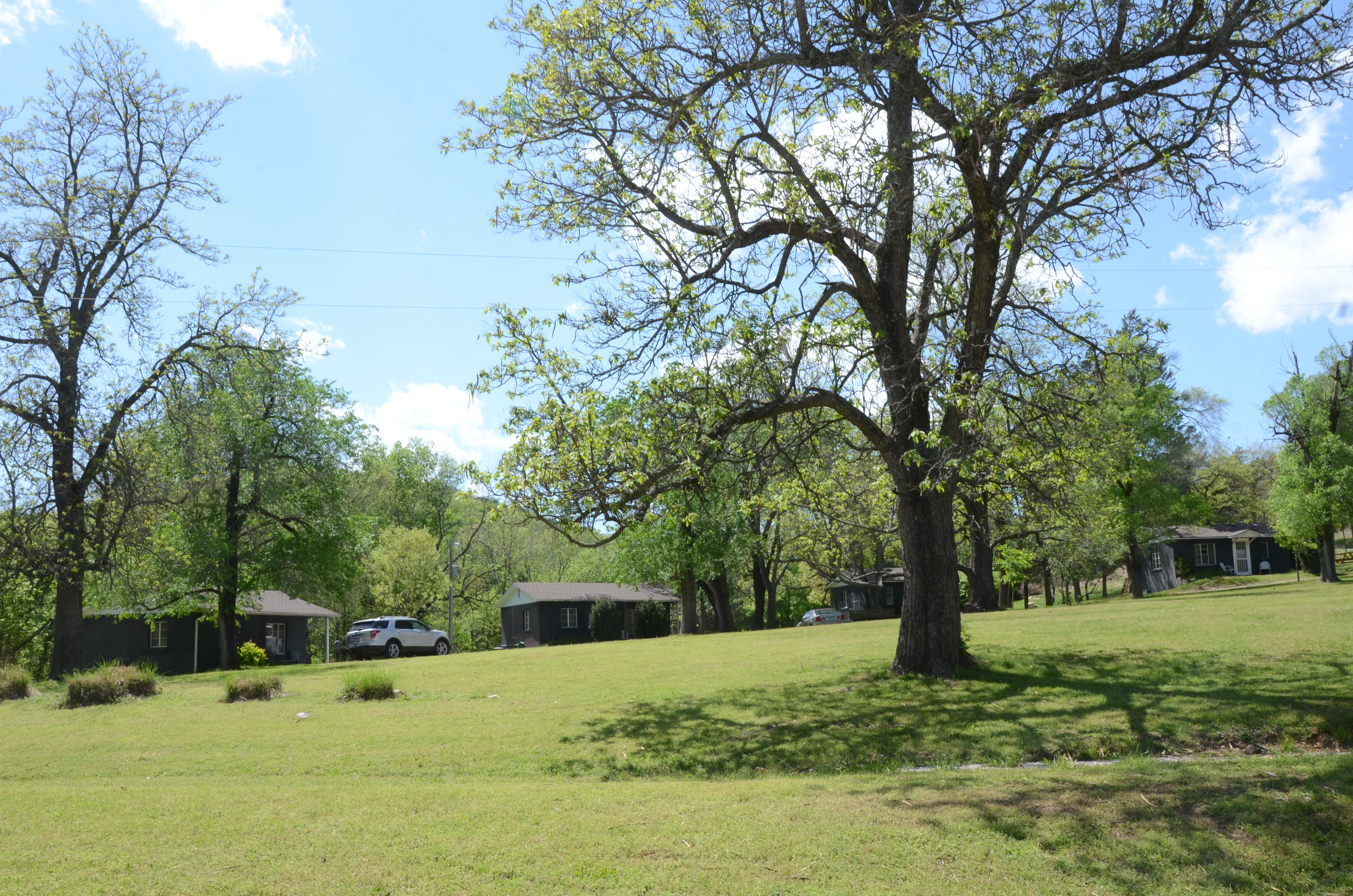
Cabins

== See also ==
- National Register of Historic Places listings in Carroll County, Arkansas
