= Mo-Ark Baptist Academy =

Historic school building in Arkansas, United States

- U.S. National Register of Historic Places
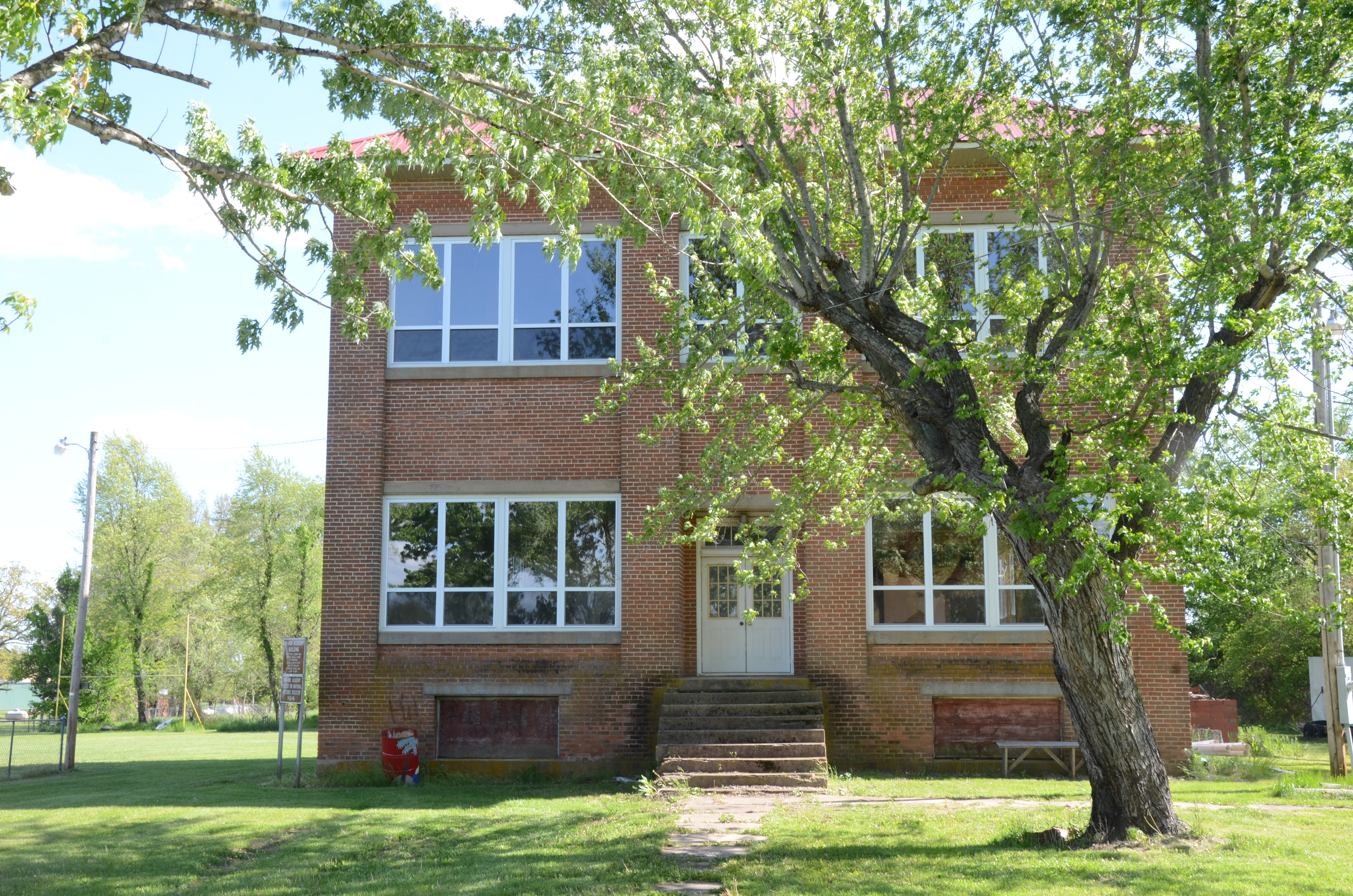

- Location within Arkansas Location within the United States
- Location: S of western terminus of Park St., Blue Eye, Arkansas
- Coordinates: 36°29′52″N 93°23′57″W
- Area: 1 acre (0.40 ha)
- Built: 1918
- NRHP reference No.: 96001030
- Added to NRHP: September 27, 1996

The Mo-Ark Baptist Academy was a Baptist Christian school in Blue Eye, Arkansas. It is located just south of the western end of Park Street, not far from the state line with Blue Eye, Missouri. It is a large T-shaped two-story brick building with a hip roof, built in 1918 to house what was initially called the Carroll County Institute. At first funded by the Arkansas Baptist Convention and the Southern Baptist Convention, it eventually also received funding from Missouri Baptists, and was renamed (first to Mo-Ark Baptist Academy and then Armo Academy). The school was later expanded to include both boys and girls dormitories; the latter still stands nearby. The school closed its doors in 1931; the building was used by the Green Forest School District as an elementary school into the 1950s, and has since seen intermittent use as a community center.

The building was listed on the National Register of Historic Places in 1996.

== See also ==
- National Register of Historic Places listings in Carroll County, Arkansas
