= Concord School House (Arkansas) =

- U.S. National Register of Historic Places
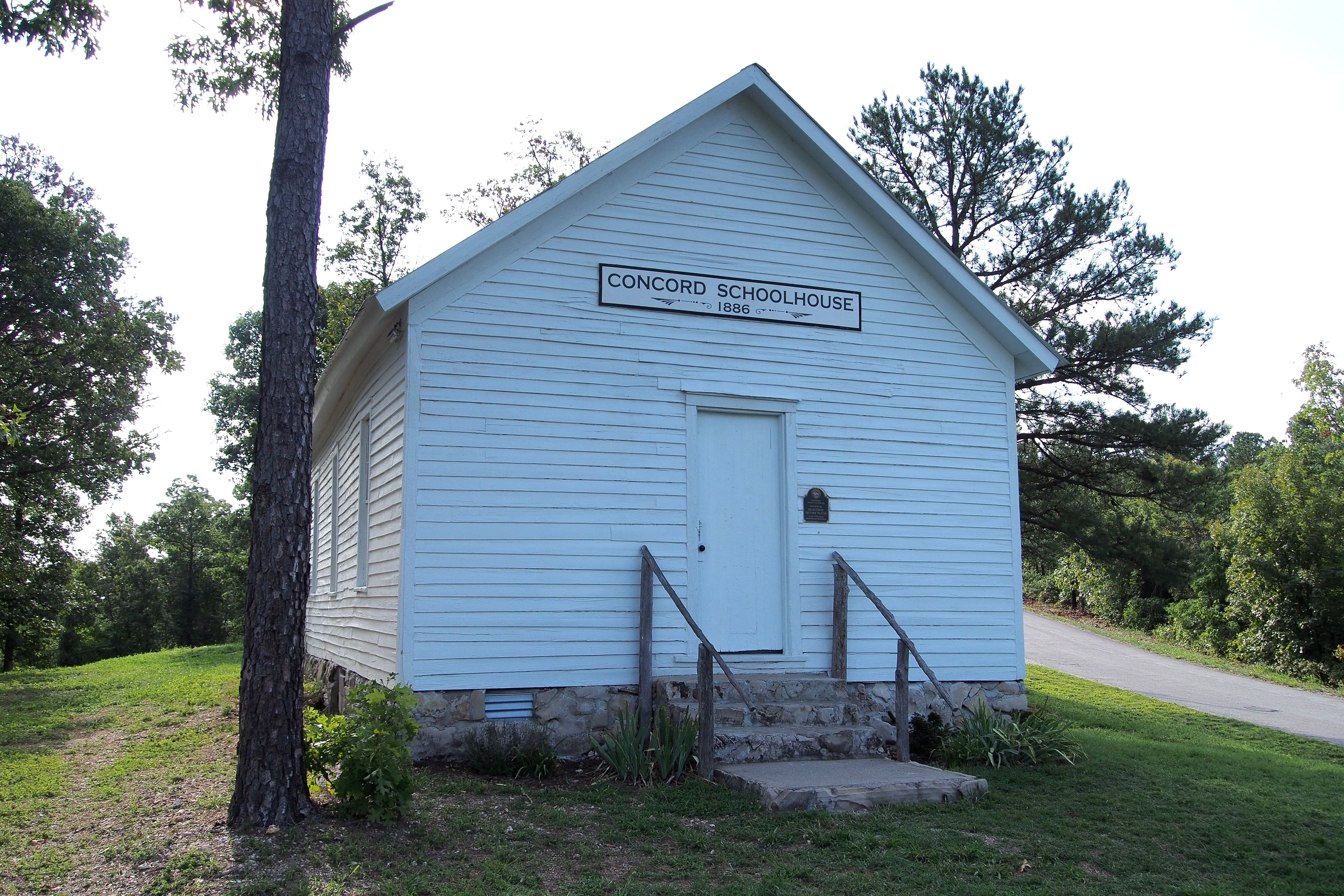

- Location within Arkansas Location within the United States
- Nearest city: Eureka Springs, Arkansas
- Coordinates: 36°23′21″N 93°40′58″W
- Area: 1 acre (0.40 ha)
- Built: 1886
- Architectural style: Plain Traditional
- NRHP reference No.: 08001334
- Added to NRHP: March 9, 2009

The Concord School House is a historic school building in rural Carroll County, Arkansas. It is located on County Road 309, east of Eureka Springs. It is a single-story wood-frame structure, built in 1886 to serve district 48 students. It was used as a school until 1948, when the area schools were consolidated. After a period of private use for storage, it was purchased by a local charity, moved to its present location, and restored. It is used as an event facility. It is one of two well-preserved one-room schoolhouses in the county.

The building was listed on the National Register of Historic Places in 2009.

== See also ==
- National Register of Historic Places listings in Carroll County, Arkansas
