= Carrollton, Arkansas =

- Unincorporated community
- Interactive map of Carrollton, Arkansas
- Coordinates: 36°15′45″N 93°19′19″W
- Country: United States
- State: Arkansas
- County: Carroll
- Time zone: UTC-6 (Central (CST))
  - Summer (DST): UTC-5 (CDT)
- ZIP code: 72611
- Area code: 870
- GNIS feature ID: 57516

Carrollton is an unincorporated community in Carroll County, Arkansas, United States. Once designated the county seat, it had a population near the 10,000 mark in the 1850s. It has now 30 residents and a historically significant past.

== History ==
Carrollton was settled circa 1840 and was named for Charles Carroll, a signatory of the U.S. Declaration of Independence. By the time of the American Civil War in 1860, Carrollton had grown to a population of 6,000. The town supported six hotels and three livery stables.

In the center of town was a basin fed by a 3/4-mile-long flume built from cedar, which was fed from a stream higher up a neighboring mountain.

A Civil War skirmish led by Confederate soldier Joe Cumia was fought there, and a historic marker now marks the site.

Carrollton was the county seat of Carroll County before the area was split into two counties in the postwar years In 1869, Carroll lost territory to the newly organized Boone County. Berryville and Eureka Springs were designated as joint county seats of Carroll County.

Wilson Springs (now Harrison) became the seat of county government for Boone County. Records for both counties were still stored in Carrollton. Rather than wait for the records to be separated, a group of men from Wilson Springs came in the dead of night in the mid-1870s, breaking into the storage area and carting off the county records.

Today, little remains of Carrollton.

== Geography ==
Carrollton is located at 36°15′45.25″N 93°19′18.66″W (36.2625706, -93.3218492).

=== Highway ===
- U.S. Highway 412
