= Osage, Arkansas =

Unincorporated community in Arkansas, U.S.

Coordinates: 36°10′57″N 93°24′17″W

Osage is an unincorporated community in Carroll County, in the U.S. state of Arkansas. The community is on the south side of Osage Creek at the junction of Osage and Kenner Creeks. U.S. Route 412 (US 412) passes on the north side of Osage Creek.

== History ==
A variant name was "Fairview". As of 1889, Osage had four houses and a country store.
