= Institute for U.S.–China Issues =

The Institute for U.S.–China Issues at the University of Oklahoma, established in August 2006, engages in research and outreach activities that seek to better understand and improve US–China relations. It also seeks to promote China studies in the State of Oklahoma. The financial support of Harold J. & Ruth Newman endowed a chair for US–China issues held by Jonathan Stalling and enabled the creation of the institute co-directed by Bo Kong.

The mission of the Institute for U.S.–China Issues seeks to establish national distinctiveness and preeminence in enhancing the understanding and management of US–China relations by simultaneously addressing two sets of interrelated issue clusters—the security, technology, economic, environmental, political, and public health (STEEPP) issues, and the instrumental role culture plays in shaping how the two nations perceive and engage each other. To achieve this goal, the institute works along parallel tracks through public programming, research, publications, symposiums, and teaching to tackle both the STEEPP and cultural issues confronting the two nations.

The institute created and hosts several programs: US–China STEEP Issues, Chinese Literature Today, the Newman Prize for Chinese Literature, the Newman Prize for English Jueju, the US–China Poetry Dialogue, and the Chinese Literature Translation Archive.

== US–China STEEP issues ==
The US–China STEEPP Dialogue brings faculty, students, and scholars together to discuss the state of US–China relations with a focus on STEEPP issues: security, technology, economics, environment, public health, and politics. The goal is to uncover the deeper structure of the bilateral relationship: its dynamics of security and insecurity, perception and misperception, identity and power.

== Chinese Literature Today ==
Chinese Literature Today journal and book series has provided English readers with access to trends in Chinese literature, film, poetry, art, theater.

== The Newman Prize for Chinese Literature ==
The Newman Prize for Chinese Literature provides a world-class platform to acknowledge the very best contemporary Chinese language fiction and poetry. From its inaugural 2009 winner, Mo Yan, who later went on to become the first Chinese citizen to win the Nobel Prize for Literature, to the 2019 winner, Xi Xi, of Honh Kong, the Newman Prize for Chinese Literature is the most respected prize of its kind.

== The Newman Prize for English Jueju ==
The Newman Prize for English Jueju, celebrates new ways of teaching the moral, aesthetic, and spiritual lessons of self cultivation through poetry in the form of a poetry competition. By learning how to compose Classical Chinese poetry forms by following the rules derived from traditional Chinese philosophy, poetics, religious and spiritual culture the Newman Prize for English Jueju is a leader in hands-on Chinese cultural learning and advocacy: The Newman Prize for English Jueju.

== The US–China Poetry Dialogue ==
The US–China Poetry Dialogue brings international, national and regional poets together for a week of travel, public conversations, readings, and workshops across different regions in the United States and in China. The dialogue on odd years brings these poets and scholars from the US and China to the University of Oklahoma in the United States, and on even years to Beijing University in China. The focus of the dialogue is to discuss the state of poetry, literature, and art in the US and China, while also exploring the role of arts in cross-cultural communication and understanding.

== The Chinese Literature Translation Archive ==
The Chinese Literature Translation Archive and Special Collections serve as an open international resource for better understanding US–China and Chinese–English translation and cultural translation. Home of the Authur Waley, Howard Goldblatt, Wolfgang Kubin, Wai-lim Yip collections and papers (among others), the center hosts exhibitions, workshops, classes, and weekly research discussions with its many research fellows.

Visiting Scholar and Fellows Program: The Institute for U.S.–China (Cultural) Issues in partnership with Chinese Literature Translation Archive has hosted nearly 30 international scholars and fellows.
