= Jonathan Stalling =

American poet and academic (born 1975)

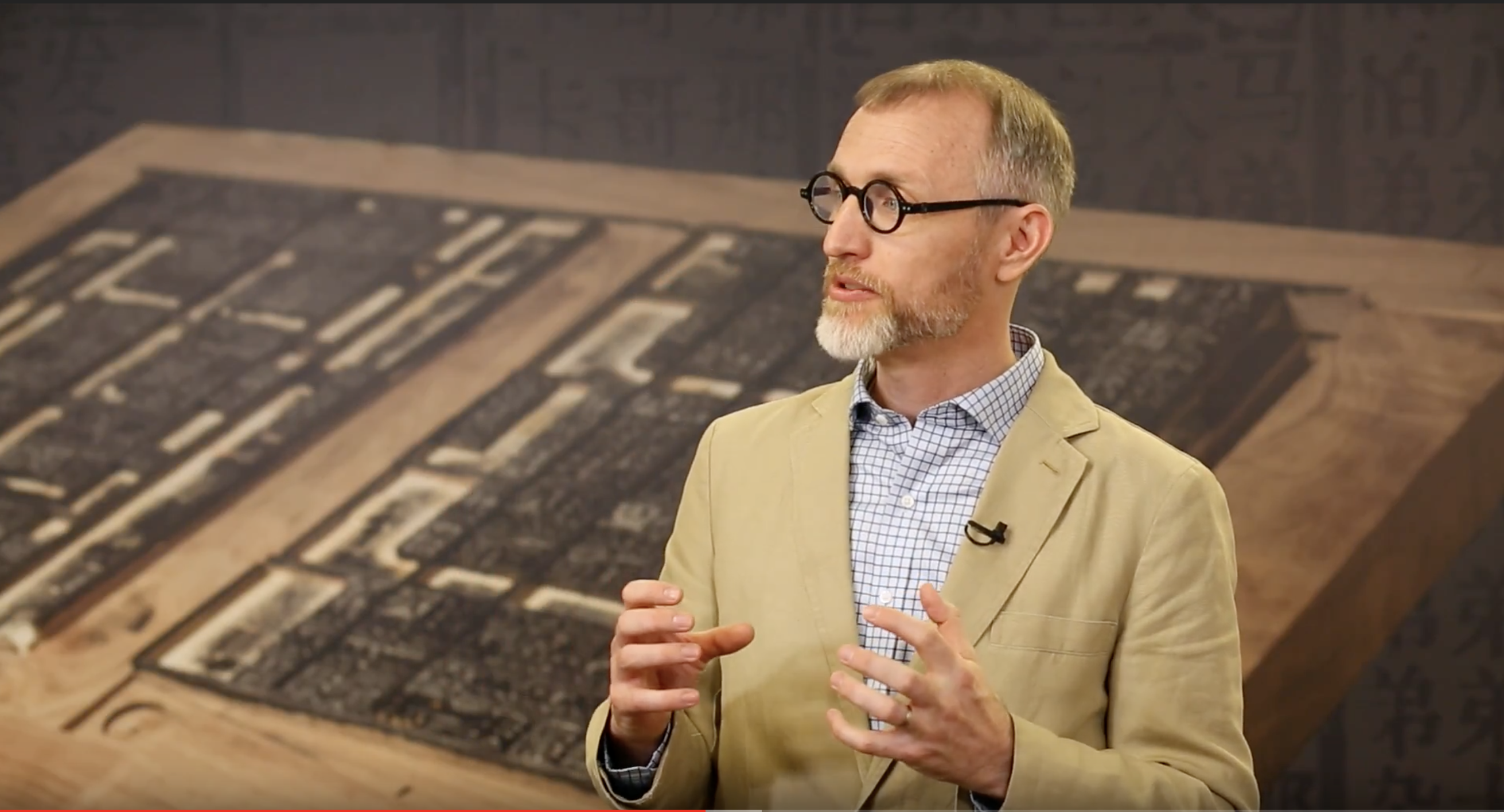
- Born: June 24, 1975 (age 51)

Academic background
- Education: University of Hawaiʻi; Beijing University; University of Edinburgh (MA); University at Buffalo (MA, PhD)

Academic work
- Institutions: University of Oklahoma

Jonathan Stalling (Chinese: 石江山，思道林; born June 24, 1975) is an American poet and academic who works at the intersection of English and Chinese. He is the William J. Crowe Jr. Chair of International Studies and Dean (interim) of the David L. Boren College of International Studies at the University of Oklahoma and formally the Harold J & Ruth Newman Chair for US-China Issues. Stalling is co-director of the Institute for US-China Issues He is also the affiliate English professor at the University of Oklahoma where he serves as the founding curator of the Chinese Literature Translation Archive (CLTA), and as a founding editor of Chinese Literature Today (CLT) journal and as the editor of the CLT (now CLT2) and CLT book series published by the University of Oklahoma Press. He is the creator of the English Jueju poetic form and Directs the Newman Prize for Chinese Literature and Newman Prize for English Jueju.

== Early life and education ==
The son of artists, Stalling grew up in Eureka Springs, Arkansas during the back-to-the-land movement, and went to Clear Spring School, where he would later return and teach. After graduating from Eureka Springs High School, he went on to study Chinese at the University of Hawaiʻi and Beijing University, after which he graduated summa cum laude from UC Berkeley with a degree in Chinese studies in 1998. He received his first master's degree from the University of Edinburgh in 2000 with distinction and his second from SUNY Buffalo, where he held the McNulty Fellowship in Ethnopoetics and later received his PhD in poetics in 2005.

== Career ==
Stalling became an assistant professor of English Literature at the University of Oklahoma in 2006 where he went on to establish the Chinese Literature Today journal, book series, and the Chinese Literature Translation Archive and Special Collections at Bizzell Memorial Library. Stalling was the first non-Chinese Poet in Residence of Beijing University and Poet in Residence of Hongcun (Huangshan, Anhui, China) in 2015. Stalling joined the Department of International and Area Studies in the College of International Studies at OU in 2019 when he assumed the position as the Harold & Ruth Newman Chair of US-China Issues, where he Co-Directs the Institute for US-China Issues. In 2022 Stalling Assumed his current role as the William J. Crowe Jr. Chair of International Studies as the Interim Dean of the David L. Boren College of International Studies.

== Teaching ==
Stalling teaches a variety of undergraduate courses on twentieth-century American poetry, east–west poetics, buddhism and beat literature, and creative writing. His graduate seminars have included courses on Orientalism and its Afterlives, East-West poetics, Comparative literature and criticism, Translation Studies and literary and cultural theory. In addition to OU courses, Stalling founded and directs the International Newman Prize for English jueju and travels widely holding jueju writing workshops and teacher training workshops and launched a new interactive online learning platform with realtime feedback from an AI avatar modeled on Stalling's 25 years of teaching training and methods Stalling has also taught courses on Second Language Acquisition based on his patented interlanguage method specifically designed to more clearly convey English pronunciation within Mandarin Chinese language environments.

== Poetry ==
Stalling is the author of three book-length collections of poetry: Grotto Heaven (Chax), Yingelishi: Sinophonic Poetry and Poetics (Counterpath), and Lost Wax: Translation through the Void (Tinfish). His opera Yingelishi (吟歌丽诗) was performed at Yunnan University in 2010, and a new version of the work is currently in production in collaboration with the composer Yan Yiguo. A new book "Yinggelishi: the Interlanguage Art of Jonathan Stalling" edited by Chen Wang is now available distributed by University of Chicago Press (https://press.uchicago.edu/ucp/books/book/distributed/Y/bo151927709.html)

== Curation ==
The Chinese Literature Translation Archive houses over 14,000 volumes from the Arthur Waley and Howard Goldblatt personal libraries with over 10,000 archival materials from Waley, Goldblatt, as well as German Sinologist Wolfgang Kubin, Poet-translator Wai-lim Yip, and Brian Hilton, among others. Stalling is the founding Director of Mark Allen Everett Poetry Reading Series at and the US-China Poetry Dialog held each year at the University of Oklahoma and Beijing University. Stalling was also the curator of the Poetics of Invention, an exhibition that explores the relationship of English and Chinese phonology through a reimagining of English in China over a 1000-year period.

== Editing ==
Stalling is a founding Editor of Chinese Literature Today journal now published under a new title Chinese Literature and Thought Today (Routledge) and CLT book series (University of Oklahoma Press) and is a co-editor of The Chinese Written Character as a Medium for Poetry (Fordham), By The River: Contemporary Chinese Novellas (Oklahoma), and Contemporary Taiwanese Women Writers: An Anthology (Cambria).

== Research and scholarship ==
Stalling is the author of the monograph Poetics of Emptiness: Transformations of Asian Thought in American Poetry (Fordham) and has published various articles and book chapters on topics ranging from transpacific poetry, translation studies, and interlanguage art and poetics. Stalling's interlanguage work is explored in a new artbook edited by Wang Chen and published by the University of Hong Kong Art Museum Press (distributed by the University of Chicago Press, 2022). This book includes chapters on Stalling's work by the Chinese-English psycholinguist Liu Nian, and Comparative Literature scholar, Timothy Billings.

== Translation ==
Stalling is the translator of Winter Sun: Poety of Shi Zhi (1966-2005) which was a finalist for the National Translation Award and has published multiple translations of the poet Zheng Xiaoqiong.

== Invention ==
Stalling is the inventor of the Stalling Chinese Character Phonetic Transcription System (思道林汉字音标) which is available as an iPhone app called Pinying, which won the Outstanding Inventor Award from the Ronnie K Irani Center for the Creation of Economic Wealth in 2016 and was awarded a Chinese patent in 2020. Stalling also created the English Jueju form of poetry and oversees the English Jueju prize held in conjunction with the Newman Prize for Chinese Literature. and a new AI backed learning platform created by Stalling is now available at www.juejupath.com. Stalling has given two TEDx Talks on interlanguage invention and his work was featured in an exhibition entitled “Poetics of Invention” at the University of Oklahoma Bizzell Memorial Library from 2017 to 2018 and at the University of Missouri Kansas City Library from 2018 to 2019.
