= Green Forest School District =

School district in Arkansas, United States

Location
- 400 East 10th Street; Green Forest, Arkansas 72638 United States
- Coordinates: 36.329°N 93.434°W

District information
- Grades: PK–12
- Superintendent: Matt Summers
- NCES District ID: 0506870

Students and staff
- Students: 1,206
- Teachers: 89
- Staff: 100
- Student–teacher ratio: 13.54
- District mascot: Tigers

Other information
- Website: www.gf.k12.ar.us

Green Forest School District is a public school district based in Green Forest, Arkansas. As of August 2012, the district serves more than 1,200 students attending Green Forest Elementary (PK–3), Green Forest Intermediate (4–5), Green Forest Middle School (6–8), and Green Forest High School (9–12).

Green Forest is one of three school districts (along with the Berryville School District and the Eureka Springs School District) that serve the student population of Carroll County, Arkansas. Since July 2012, Matt Summers has served as superintendent of the Green Forest School District.

In October 2012, the district was recognized as a "Higher Performing School" by the National Center for Educational Achievement. Also in 2012, the district's elementary and middle schools were ranked among the "top 25 high-poverty schools" in Arkansas by the University of Arkansas Office for Education Policy.

It serves a portion of Alpena.

== History ==
In 1966 the Carroll County School District dissolved with a piece going to the Green Forest district.
