= Clear Spring High School =

Clear Spring High School may refer to:

- Clear Spring School, the high school portion of Clear Spring School in Eureka Springs, Arkansas
- Clear Spring High School (Maryland), Clear Spring, Maryland

Also, may refer to:

- Clear Springs High School, League City, Texas
