= Festus Orestes Butt =

American lawyer, judge, politician and businessman (1875–1972)

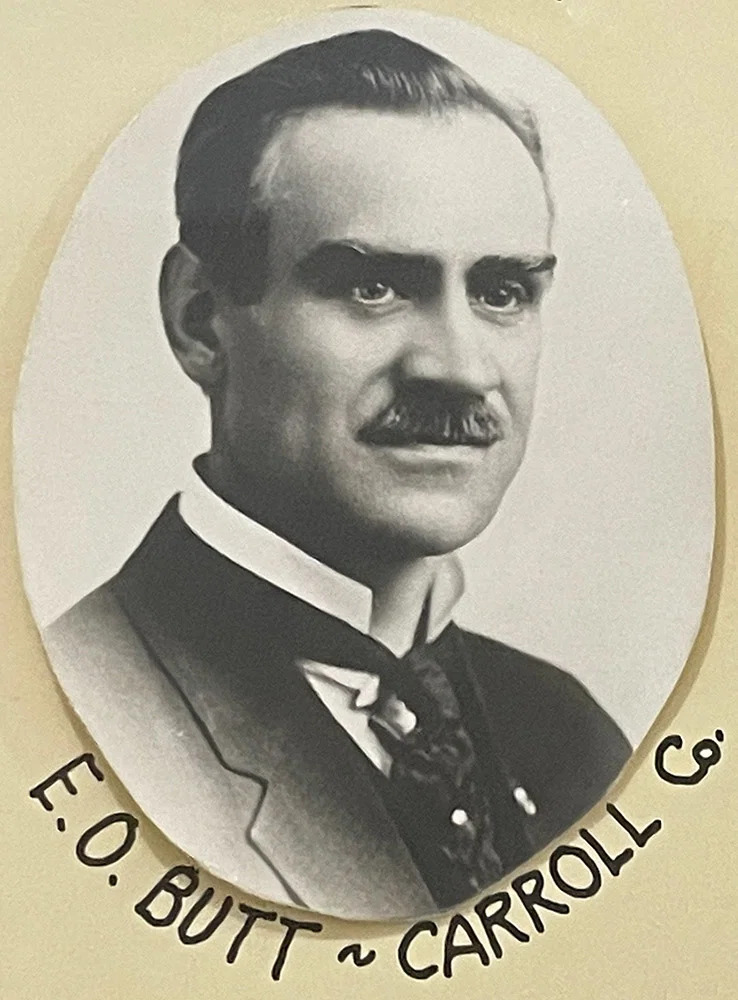

Member of the Arkansas Senate
- In office 1927–1930
- In office 1903–1906

Mayor of Eureka Springs
- In office ?

Member of the Arkansas House of Representatives
- In office 1897–1900

Personal details
- Born: February 3, 1875 near Lovington, Illinois, U.S.
- Died: June 30, 1972 (aged 97) Fayetteville, Arkansas, U.S.
- Spouse: Essie Mae Cox (m. 1901)
- Children: 7
- Occupation: Politician; lawyer; judge
- Criminal information
- Conviction: Bribery
- Penalty: 24 months in Arkansas State Penitentiary (pardoned)

Festus Orestes Butt (February 3, 1875 – June 30, 1972) was an American lawyer, judge, politician and businessman. He served two terms in the Arkansas House of Representatives from 1897 to 1900. He served as a state senator in Arkansas from 1903 to 1906.

== Early life ==
Butt was born on February 3, 1875, near Lovington, Illinois. William Alvin Butt Sr., a farmer and Union Army veteran, and Anne Maria Weaver Butt were his parents. He grew up in Green Forest, Arkansas.

== Career ==
Butt served two terms in the Arkansas House of Representatives from 1897 to 1900. He served as a state senator in Arkansas from 1903 to 1906. He was convicted of bribery for an appropriation related to construction of a new state capitol. Governor X. O. Pindall pardoned him on June 27, 1907.

He was elected mayor of Eureka Springs in 1911 and served two terms. He was appointed as a delegate to the 1917–1918 Arkansas Constitutional Convention. He was elected to his old state senate district in 1926, serving in 1927 and again in 1930.

== Personal life and death ==
Butt married Essie Mae Cox on May 21, 1901, and they had seven children.

He died in Fayetteville, Arkansas on June 30, 1972. Fayetteville A historical marker at his law office commemorates his history.
