= William Penn (disambiguation) =

William Penn (1644–1718) was the English founder of Pennsylvania

William Penn may also refer to:

== People ==
- William Penn (Royal Navy officer) (1621–1670), English admiral under Cromwell and Charles II and the father of William Penn
- William Penn Jr. (1681–1720), eldest surviving son of William Penn, founder of Pennsylvania
- William Penn (athlete) (1883–1943), American tug-of-war competitor
- William Evander Penn (1832–1895), Texas Baptist evangelist and minister
- William S. Penn (1949-2025), mixed-race Nez Perce author and English professor at Michigan State University
- William F. Penn (1871–1934), black physician in Atlanta, Georgia
- William Penn (pen name), pen name used by activist Jeremiah Evarts (1781–1831) in his essays against Indian removal
- William Penn (cricketer) (1849–1921), Kent county cricketer

== Schools and societies ==
- William Penn University, private liberal arts university in Iowa
- William Penn Middle School, part of the Pennsbury School District in Bucks County, Pennsylvania
- William Penn High School (Delaware) in New Castle, Delaware
- William Penn High School (North Carolina) in High Point, North Carolina
- William Penn High School (Philadelphia) in Philadelphia, Pennsylvania
- William Penn Charter School,

== Other ==
- William Penn (cigar brand), type of machine-made cigars manufactured by General Cigar Company
- USS Tecumseh (SSBN-628), submarine that was going to be named the USS William Penn
- a train operated by Amtrak as part of the Clocker service
- William Penn (Calder), an 1894 bronze statue by Alexander Milne Calder
- William Penn, Texas, an unincorporated community in Washington County, Texas
- William Penn Memorial Fire Tower,
