= Chinese Literature Translation Archive =

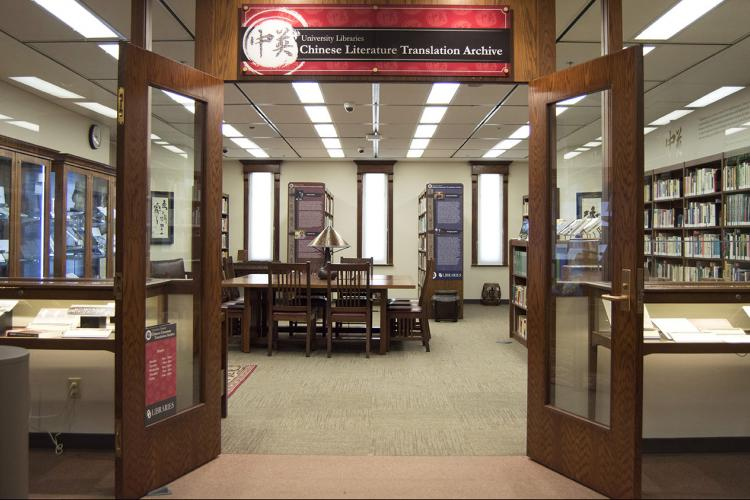
Chinese Literature Translation Archive

The University of Oklahoma Bizzell Memorial Libraries Chinese Literature Translation Archive (CLTA) provides both scholars and students with a wide range of rare books, translation drafts, correspondence, notes, ephemera, and more documentation that helps users to have a deeper understanding of Chinese Literature. CLTA contains more than 14,000 volumes and numerous documents from many famous translators including Howard Goldblatt, Wolfgang Kubin, Arthur Waley, and Wai-lim Yip. Jonathan Stalling is the curator of Chinese Literature Translation Archive.

== Special collections ==
=== Howard Goldblatt collection ===
Howard Goldblatt translated over 40 novels, and many other essays and articles. This collection includes his personal papers, letters, notes with many different authors include Xiao Hong, Xiao Jun, and Mo Yan, etc. The Howard Goldblatt collection is split into three different series, includes Author Series, Howard Goldblatt Series, and Northeast Writer Series.

=== Wolfgang Kubin collection ===
Wolfgang Kubin translated many different poems and articles. This collection includes numerous personal letters, notes, and correspondence with many different authors including Yang Lian and Bei Dao.

=== Arthur Waley collection ===
Chinese Literature Translation Archive holds many personal papers and books published by Arthur Waley.

=== Wai-lim Yip collection ===
Chinese Literature Translation Archive holds many correspondence and letters by Wai-lim Yip.
