= Byrd Mock =

American painter

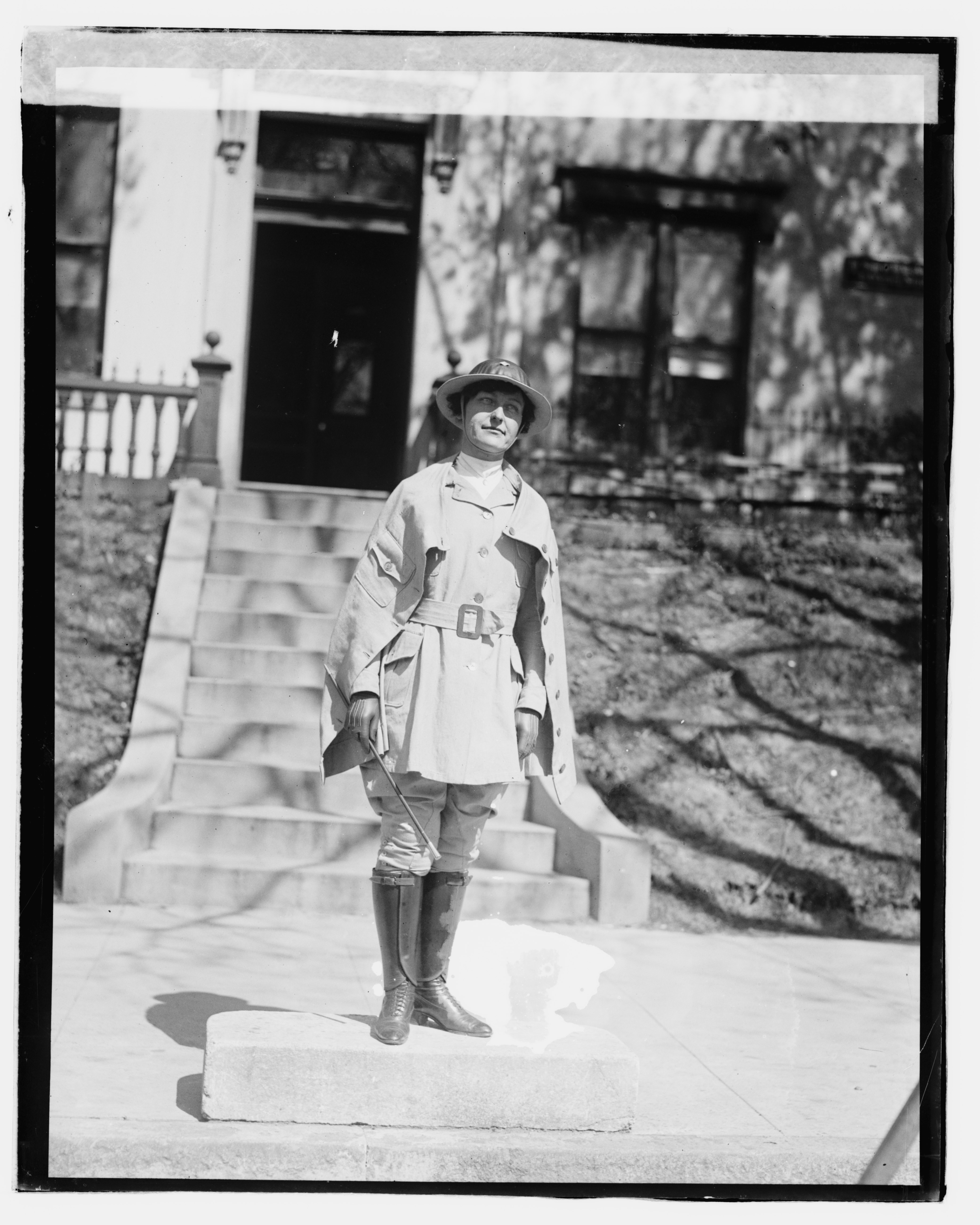
- Mock in 1920
- Born: Lucy Byrd Mock; February 23, 1876; Prairie Grove, Arkansas, United States
- Died: November 17, 1966 (aged 89); Fort Smith, Arkansas, United States
- Occupation(s): Writer journalist, poet, publisher, editor, golfer

Byrd Mock (February 23, 1876 – November 17, 1966) was an American writer, journalist, poet, and publisher, who also set numerous records as a golfer.

Born Lucy Byrd Mock in Prairie Grove, Arkansas on February 23, 1876, she attended the Methodist Academy until 1890, when she was admitted to the University of Arkansas as a fourteen-year-old sophomore. In 1893, she spent part of her summer break on a trip overseas to Great Britain, where she learned to play golf. Mock enjoyed the game so much that she purchased a set of golf clubs to bring home. With no golf course in Arkansas at the time, Mock drafted a five-hole layout that included putting greens and fairways. Upon its completion that summer, the seventeen-year-old golfer and a group of friends played the first round of golf in Arkansas. When Mock returned to UA in the fall, she became the first player to represent the school in that sport. She was later confirmed to be Arkansas's first golfer and golf instructor, and the world's first woman to design and build a golf course.

Mock taught at Jessamine College in Kentucky until 1900, when she returned to UA, receiving her MA in 1905. She moved to St. Louis, Missouri, and taught Greek and Latin at Forest Park University for Women. Around 1909, Mock relocated to Seattle, Washington, where she wrote magazine articles about the area's scenic locations, history, and Native American culture, and opened a publishing firm called at the Sign of the Mocking Bird. Mock was living in Los Angeles, California, when the city hosted the 1932 Summer Olympics, which inspired her to write "The Olympic Games: Past, Present, and Future, A Pindaric Ode." In 1936, Avery Brundage, then President of the American Olympic Committee, was presented with a copy of her Olympic Ode, illustrated by the American artist, Charles Sinclair. It became part of the painting event in the art competition at the 1936 Summer Olympics.

Mock married William Lafayette Crittenden in 1911 in Seattle; they had divorced by 1915. She later married Willet E. Dentinger in 1923, they divorced by 1930.

Mock spent the latter part of her career as a reviewing editor in New York City from the mid-1930s until her retirement in 1956, when she moved to Eureka Springs, Arkansas. She died on November 17, 1966, in Fort Smith, Arkansas
