= Eureka Springs Transit =

Provider of mass transportation in Carroll County, Arkansas

- Founded: 1978
- Headquarters: 137 W. Van Buren
- Locale: Eureka Springs, Arkansas
- Service area: Carroll County, Arkansas
- Service type: Bus service, paratransit
- Routes: 4
- Stations: Downtown Trolley Depot; Eureka Transit Center
- Annual ridership: 115,492 (2022)
- Website: Eureka Springs Transit

Eureka Springs Transit is the primary provider of mass transportation in Eureka Springs, Arkansas, with four routes serving the region. As of 2022, the system provided 115,492 rides over 11,283 annual vehicle revenue hours with 9 buses and 4 paratransit vehicles.

== History ==
Public transit in Eureka Springs began in 1891 when 10 mulecars began operating on city streets under the Eureka Springs Electric Light & Street Railway Co. In the late 1890s, the mulecars were replaced by electric streetcars, which would operate in the city until 1920.

It was not until July 31, 1978 that transit would return with replica trolleys. Six years later the city acquired land for the two transfer facilities. Beginning May 3, 2024, the city began to extend service hours into the evenings on Fridays and Saturdays with an on-demand shuttle.

== Service ==
Eureka Springs Transit operates three seasonal schedules based on demand. Only two routes operate in the winter while all four operate from March until November. All routes serve the Eureka Transit Center and Downtown Trolley Depot. Regular fares are $4.00.

Hours of operation for the system are Wednesday through Saturday from 10:00 A.M. to 5:00 P.M. in the winter, Tuesday through Friday from 10:00 A.M. to 6:00 P.M. and Saturday from 9:00 A.M. to 6:00 P.M. in the spring and fall, and Sunday through Friday from 10:00 A.M. to 6:00 P.M. and Saturday from 9:00 A.M. to 8:00 P.M. in the summer.

=== Routes ===
- Red Route
- Purple Route
- Yellow Route
- Blue Route

== Fixed route ridership ==
The ridership statistics shown here are of fixed route services only and do not include demand response services.

== See also ==
- List of bus transit systems in the United States
