= The Gospel of Eureka =

- Directed by: Michael Palmieri, Donal Mosher
- Written by: Donal Mosher
- Narrated by: Justin Vivian Bond
- Release date: March 11, 2018 (South by Southwest)
- Running time: 75 minutes
- Country: United States
- Language: English

The Gospel of Eureka is a 2018 documentary directed by Michael Palmieri and Donal Mosher about the lives of LGBT individuals and evangelical Christians in Eureka Springs, Arkansas.
