= Rachel Beasley Ray =

American writer

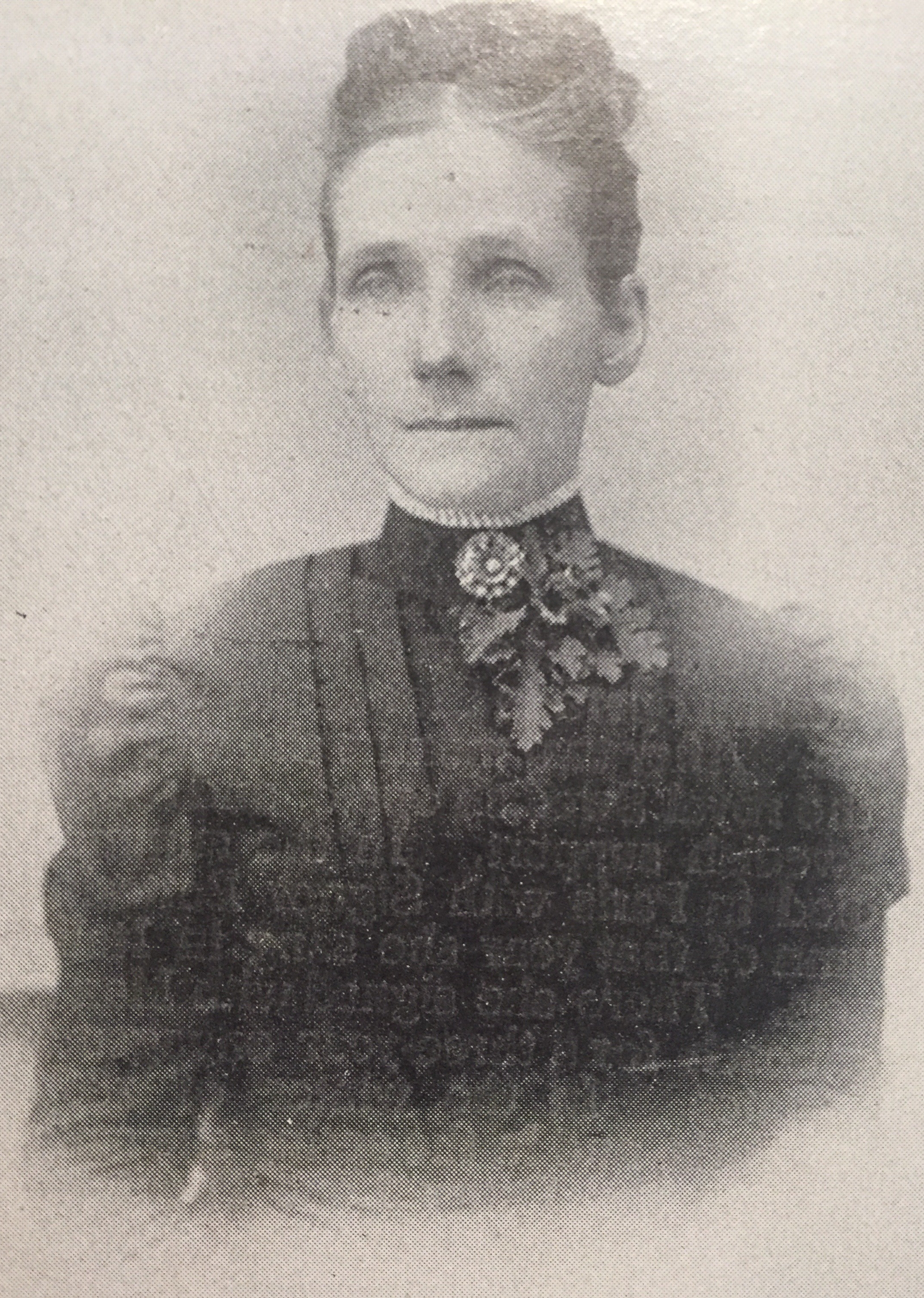
- Born: Rachel Beasley; January 31, 1849; Anderson County, Kentucky
- Died: June 27, 1915 (aged 66)
- Burial place: Woodlawn Cemetery, Tampa
- Other name: Mattie M'Intosh
- Occupation: Writer
- Known for: A woman of the century

Rachel Beasley Ray (January 31, 1849 – June 27, 1915) was a writer and poet who used the penname Mattie M'Intosh.

== Early life ==
Rachel Beasley was born in Anderson County, Kentucky on January 31, 1849. She was the fifth daughter of Judge Elisha Beasley and Almeda Penney, who reared eight girls, of whom Kate Carrington was the youngest. When Rachel was an infant, her parents moved to Hickman County, Kentucky and settled in the town of Clinton, Kentucky.

Judge Beasley gave his children every educational advantage within his reach, and the consequence was that all eight daughters became teachers.

== Career ==
At the age of sixteen, Ray was left an orphan by the death of her mother, her father having died two years before. A few months later she entered Clinton Seminary, as both student and teacher. For fourteen years she was almost constantly employed in educational work, either as teacher or student, and often as both. She spent every spare moment during that time writing stories, poems and practical articles. Her last school work was done in Clinton College (Kentucky), where she acted in the capacity of both student and teacher.

For many years she indulged her fondness for the pen by contributing largely to different weeklies and periodicals. "The Ruined Home," a continued story, published in 1889, in a St. Louis weekly, gave her views on the use of alcoholic drinks.

She was a member of the Baptist Church. Her husband was also a Baptist and deacon in that church. She wrote the "Leaves from the Deacon's Wife's Scrap Book," which were original and humorously written sketches from her daily life and were well received by the public.

She strongly favored women's advancement and was an avid advocate of the Temperance Movement.

Judge Ray was a lawyer and real estate agent with extensive business, and Rachel was his secretary. She wrote daily at a desk in his office, and in his absence took entire charge of his business.

Ray edited three Woman's Christian Temperance Union columns each week in her city's newspapers.

== Personal life ==
Rachel Beasley married Edwin Ruthven Ray (1828–1915), of Hickman County, on October 10, 1878.

In the summer of 1880, Rachel Ray had an attack of rheumatic fever, from which her recovery was so slow that a change of climate became necessary, and her husband took her to Eureka Springs, a health resort in Arkansas. There she improved so quickly that she could resume her usual duties, and the family settled there permanently.

Rachel Ray died on June 27, 1915, and is buried at Woodlawn Cemetery, Tampa, Florida, with her husband.
