= Green Forest High School =

Location
- 801 Tommy Ratzlaff Avenue; Green Forest, Arkansas 72638; United States; 36°19′45″N 93°26′4″W

Information
- Type: Public secondary
- School district: Green Forest School District
- NCES District ID: 0506870
- CEEB code: 040940
- NCES School ID: 050687000416
- Staff: 69.73 (on FTE basis)
- Grades: 9–12
- Student to teacher ratio: 6.22
- Colors: Red and white
- Athletics conference: 3A Region 1 (2012–14)
- Mascot: Tiger
- USNWR ranking: No. 17 (AR); No. 1,836 (USA)
- Federal funding: Title I
- Website: www.gf.k12.ar.us/253603_2

Green Forest High School is a comprehensive four-year public secondary school in Green Forest, Arkansas, United States. It is one of ten public high schools in Carroll County and the sole high school administered by the Green Forest School District.

== Academics ==
The assumed course of study follows the Smart Core curriculum developed by the Arkansas Department of Education (ADE), which requires students to complete at least 22 units to graduate. Students complete regular (core and career focus) courses and exams and may select Advanced Placement coursework and exams that provide an opportunity for college credit. The school is accredited by the ADE.

In 2012, Green Forest was nationally recognized with the Silver Medal Award in the U.S. News & World Report Best High Schools ranking report as the No. 17 high school in the state and No. 1,836 in the nation.

In April 2012, the EAST Initiative program at Green Forest received national honors with a Superior rating for the second consecutive year and by winning the National Service Project award.

== Athletics ==
The Green Forest High School mascot and athletic emblem is the Tiger with red and white serving as its school colors.

For 2012–14, the Green Forest Tigers compete in the 3A Classification within the 3A Region 1 Conference as sanctioned by the Arkansas Activities Association (AAA). Interscholastic activities include football, basketball, baseball, cheer, cross country (boys/girls), golf (boys/girls), softball, and track (boys/girls).

The boys basketball team won consecutive state basketball championships in 1967 and 1968.
