= Crescent Hotel (Eureka Springs, Arkansas) =

Hotel in Eureka Springs, Arkansas

- U.S. National Register of Historic Places
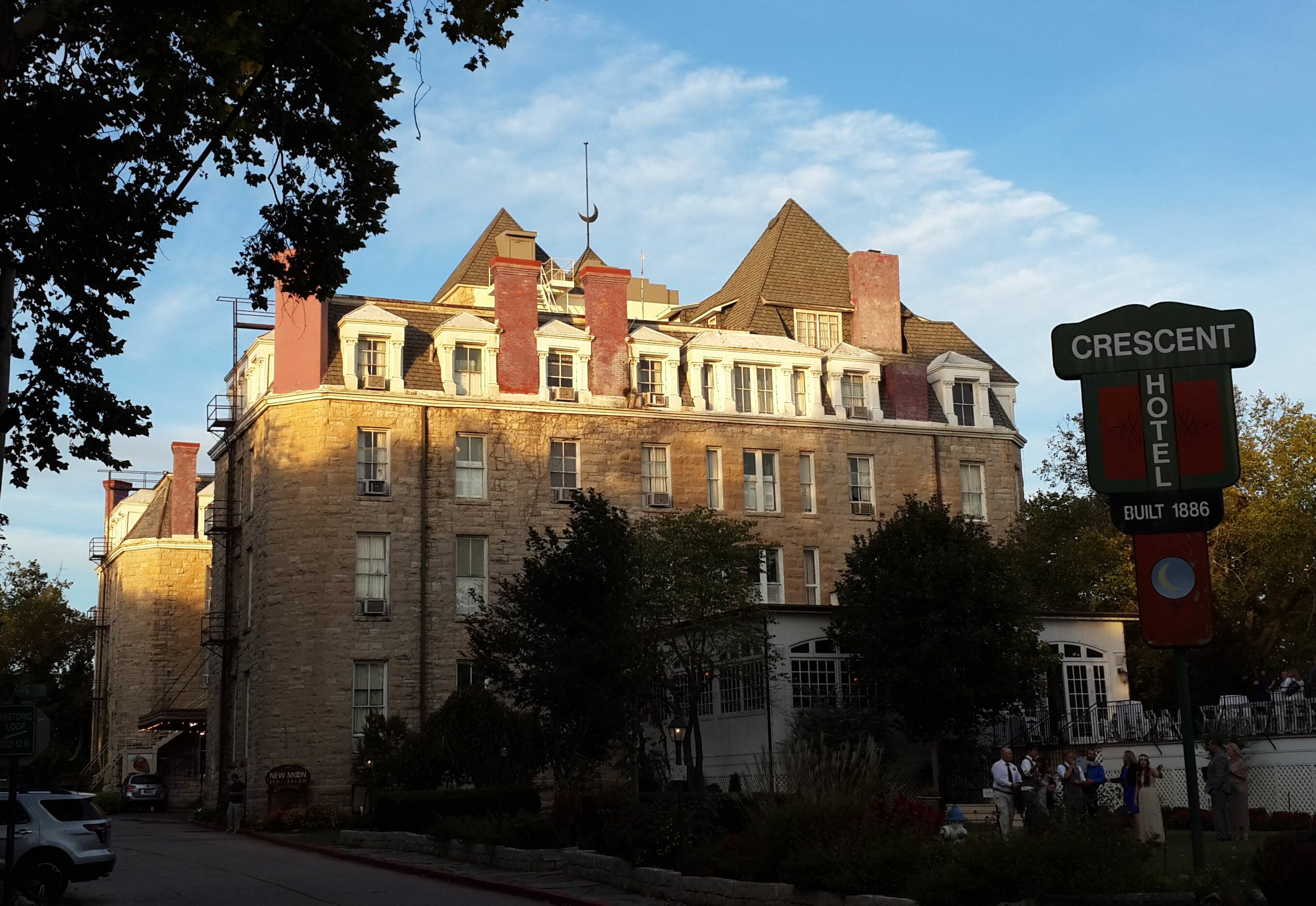
- Crescent Hotel in 2014

- Location within Arkansas Location within the United States
- Location: 75 Prospect Avenue
- Nearest city: Eureka Springs, Arkansas
- Coordinates: 36°24′30″N 93°44′15″W
- Architect: Isaac S. Taylor
- NRHP reference No.: 15000991
- Added to NRHP: January 26, 2016

The Crescent Hotel is a historic hotel at 75 Prospect Avenue in Eureka Springs, Arkansas. The 1886 Crescent Hotel & Spa is a member of Historic Hotels of America, the official program of the National Trust for Historic Preservation. After the hotel closed the building was used for Crescent College and Conservatory for Young Women before returning to use as a hotel and then a hospital and health resort before once again being restored for use as a hotel.

== History ==
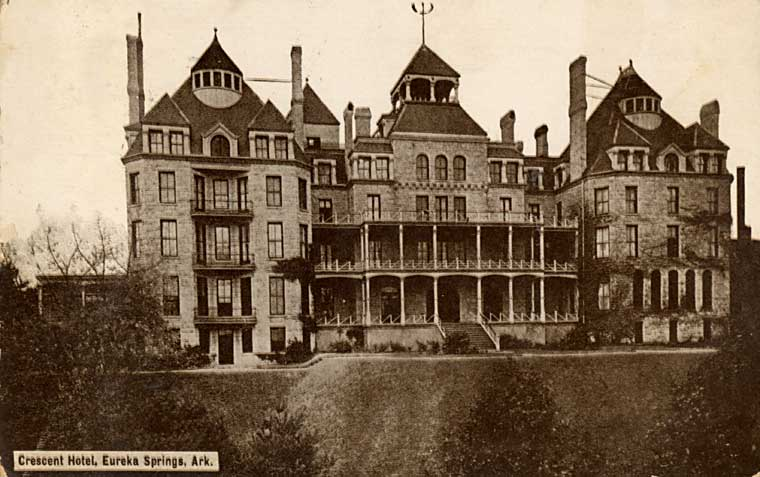
Crescent Hotel, Eureka Springs, Arkansas, circa 1886

The Crescent Hotel was built in 1886, designed by St. Louis-based architect Isaac S. Taylor, as an elite resort with modern amenities such as electricity and elevators. The hotel quickly faced business struggles and fell into disrepair, only open to the public during the summer vacationing months. In 1908, as a bid to bring in more revenue for the ailing hotel, it was reopened as the Crescent College and Conservatory for Young Women. This institution offered courses in domestic arts, music, history, science, mathematics, theater, and literature. After the college closed in 1934, the Crescent was leased as a summer hotel once again.

In 1937, it got a new owner, con man Norman G. Baker, who turned the place into a hospital and health resort, calling it a "castle in the air" in radio broadcasts. Baker, a millionaire, inventor and radio personality, styled himself as a doctor despite having had no medical training. He claimed to have discovered a number of "cures" for various ailments, including cancer, and launched frequent attacks on organized medicine, which he accused of being corrupt and profit-driven. His "cure" consisted primarily of drinking the area's natural spring water, which dates back to Native American legends which coined the springs as the "fountain of youth." In 1940, federal charges were filed against Baker for mail fraud and he spent four years in prison. The Crescent Hotel was left ownerless until 1946. In the spring of 1946, the Crescent Hotel was purchased by John R. Constantine, Herbert E. Shutter, Herbert Byfield, and Dwight Nichols. On March 15, 1967, the hotel's fourth floor burned, necessitating large renovations by the last living owner Dwight Nichols.

In 1997, Marty and Elise Roenigk purchased the Crescent Hotel for $1.3 million. They oversaw a six-year restoration and renovation of the hotel rooms that added historical furnishings and restored the building's spa in the basement level. Marty Roenigk died in a car crash in 2009; Elise Roenigk remains the hotel's current owner.

The building was listed on the National Register of Historic Places in 2016. In 2019, excavation at the hotel discovered medicinal bottles from Baker's time as owner. Roughly 500 jam jar sized bottles and an old bone saw were found buried at the edge of the woods behind the hotel. Many of these jars and bottles were found in pristine condition with a yellowing liquid inside. Some contained a substance labeled as a "cancer cure" from Baker's cancer experiments dating back to the late 1930's. Other bottles found on the site contained tumors and other tissue samples preserved in alcohol.

== In popular culture ==
In 2005, the hotel was featured on the television show Ghost Hunters where the cast claimed to see what they described as “a full-body apparition” on their thermal imaging camera.

== See also ==
- National Register of Historic Places listings in Carroll County, Arkansas
