= Frances Currey =

American painter

Frances Curry
- Born: 1925; Indianapolis, Indiana, United States
- Died: 2012 (aged 86–87)
- Resting place: Sylvan Abbey Memorial Park, Clearwater, Florida, United States
- Education: Ball State University
- Known for: Painting
- Style: Folk art
- Spouse: George Brown
- Patrons: Luci Baines Johnson
- Website: grandmafran.com

Frances Currey (1925–2012; also known as Grandma Fran and Frances Currey Brown) was an American folk art painter.

== Early life and education ==
Frances Currey was born in Indianapolis, Indiana in 1925. She was raised on a farm in Jennings County, Indiana.

In the mid-1960s, Currey was a school teacher, teaching third grade in Liberty, Indiana. She had earned her master's degree at Ball State University in Elementary Education. She also studied for her doctorate, studying Alzheimer's disease at Earlham College. She married and had three children.

== Mid-life and career ==
Currey would remarry, marrying George Brown. In the 1970s, Currey's son, James Clarkson, moved to Mississippi. Currey mailed her 2-year-old granddaughter postcards with drawings on them. Another artist recognized Currey's talent and encouraged her to start painting larger scale works and selling them. Thus, Currey and her husband opened an art studio in Berryville, Arkansas. They both sold their art in the studio.

In 1978, "Moving Day," was acquired by the Smithsonian American Art Museum. Around the same time, she submitted her work to a call for artists by Jimmy Carter. Her work was accepted and was displayed at Carter's cabin.

In 1981, Luci Baines Johnson commissioned her first painting from Currey. Johnson visited Currey's gallery while visiting the Ozark Mountains. The work, titled "T.J. Taylor -- Dealer in Everything," "depicts a normal day in the life" of T.J. Turpin, Johnson's husband's grandfather.

Currey was commissioned, in 1992, by the Shiloh Museum of Ozark History to create "Decoration Day," which depicts Memorial Day and the decorating of tombstones.

== Later life and legacy ==
Currey was diagnosed as suffering from Alzheimer's disease in 2006. She was placed in a nursing home in 2009, in Eureka Springs, Arkansas. She died in December 2012 and was buried in Sylvan Abbey Memorial Park in Clearwater, Florida.

== Work ==
Currey was a folk artist who painted depictions of her childhood in Indiana and everyday life of living on a farm and small town. She had no formal training. Her work is story based. Currey would tell stories to visitors to the studio to accompany her paintings.

== Notable collections ==
- "Moving Day" - 1978, watercolor and pencil on paper, Smithsonian American Art Museum
