= Eureka Springs, Arkansas =

City in Arkansas, United States

- City
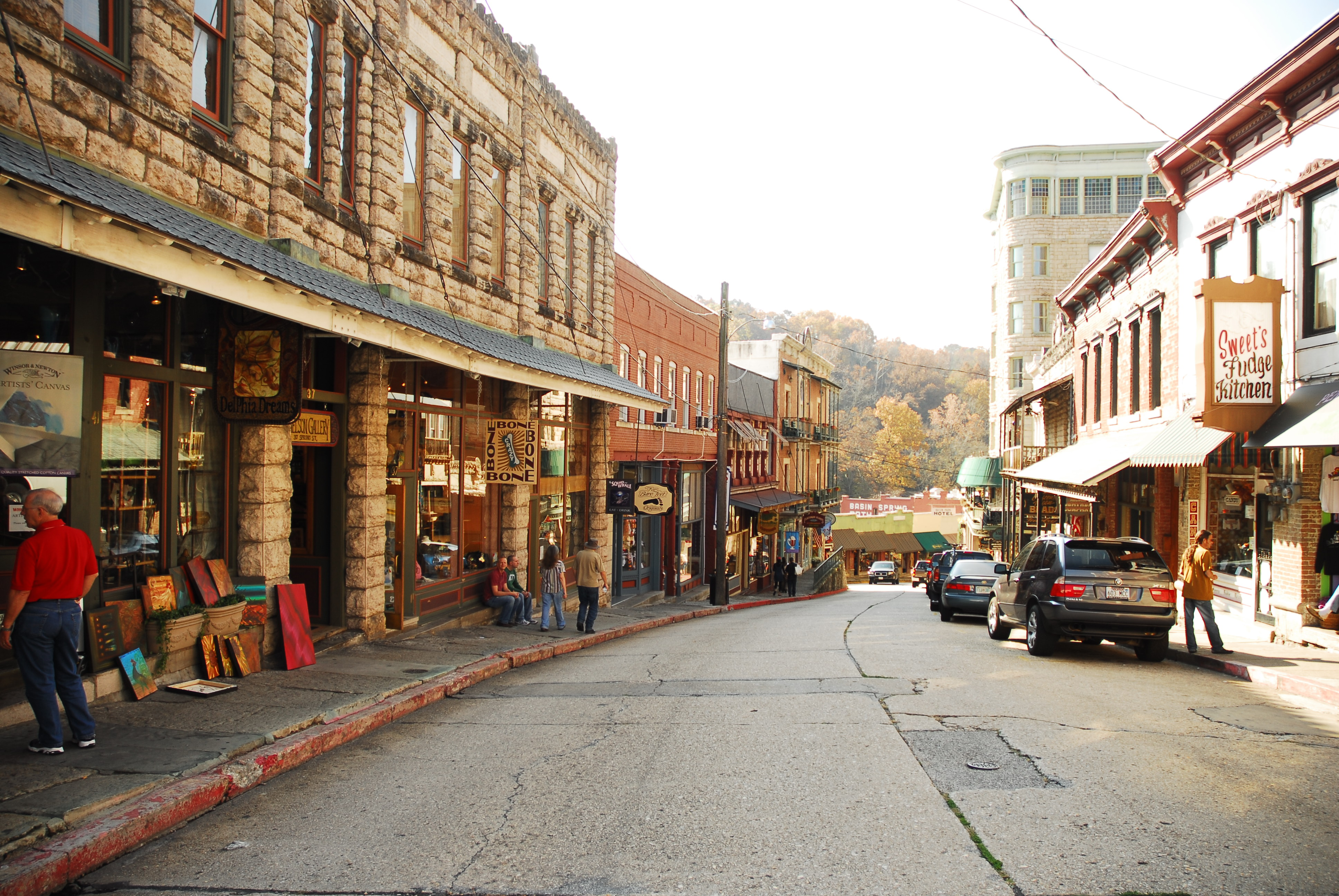
- Spring Street
- Nicknames: "Eureka", "Little Switzerland of America", "The Stairstep Town"
- Location within Carroll County and Arkansas
- Coordinates: 36°24′38″N 93°44′42″W
- Country: United States
- State: Arkansas
- County: Carroll
- Incorporated: 1880

Government
  - Type: Mayor–council government
  - Mayor: Butch Berry

Area
  - Total: 6.90 sq mi (17.86 km^{2})
  - Land: 6.76 sq mi (17.50 km^{2})
  - Water: 0.14 sq mi (0.36 km^{2})
- Elevation: 1,421 ft (433 m)

Population (2020)
  - Total: 2,166
  - Estimate (2025): 2,258 ▲
  - Density: 320.5/sq mi (123.75/km^{2})
- Time zone: UTC−6 (CST)
  - Summer (DST): UTC−5 (CDT)
- ZIP Codes: 72631–72632
- Area code: 479
- FIPS code: 05-22240
- GNIS ID: 2403579
- Website: www.eurekaspringsar.gov

Eureka Springs is a city in Carroll County, Arkansas, United States, and one of two county seats for the county. It is located in the Ozark Mountains of northwest Arkansas, near the border with Missouri. As of the 2020 census, the city population was 2,166.

In 1970, the entire city, as of its borders at that time, was listed on the National Register of Historic Places as the Eureka Springs Historic District. Eureka Springs has been selected as one of America's Distinctive Destinations by the National Trust for Historic Preservation. Eureka Springs was originally called "The Magic City", "Little Switzerland of the Ozarks", and later the "Stairstep Town" because of its mountainous terrain and the winding, up-and-down paths of its streets and walkways.

It is a tourist destination for its unique character as a Victorian resort, which first attracted visitors to use its then-believed healing springs. The city has steep, winding streets filled with Victorian-style cottages and manors. The historic commercial downtown of the city has an extensive streetscape of well-preserved Victorian buildings. The buildings are primarily constructed of local stone, built along limestone streets that curve around the hills, and rise and fall with the topography in a five-mile-long loop. Some buildings have street-level entrances on more than one floor and other such oddities: the Basin Park Hotel has its front entrances on the floor below first, and a ground-level emergency exit in the back of the building on the fifth floor. The streets wind around the town, with few intersecting at right angles. There are no traffic lights.

== History ==
Archaeological evidence indicates that Paleoindian peoples lived in the region thousands of years ago. During the Archaic and Woodland periods, inhabitants produced stone tools, including projectile points, from locally available chert.

=== 19th century ===
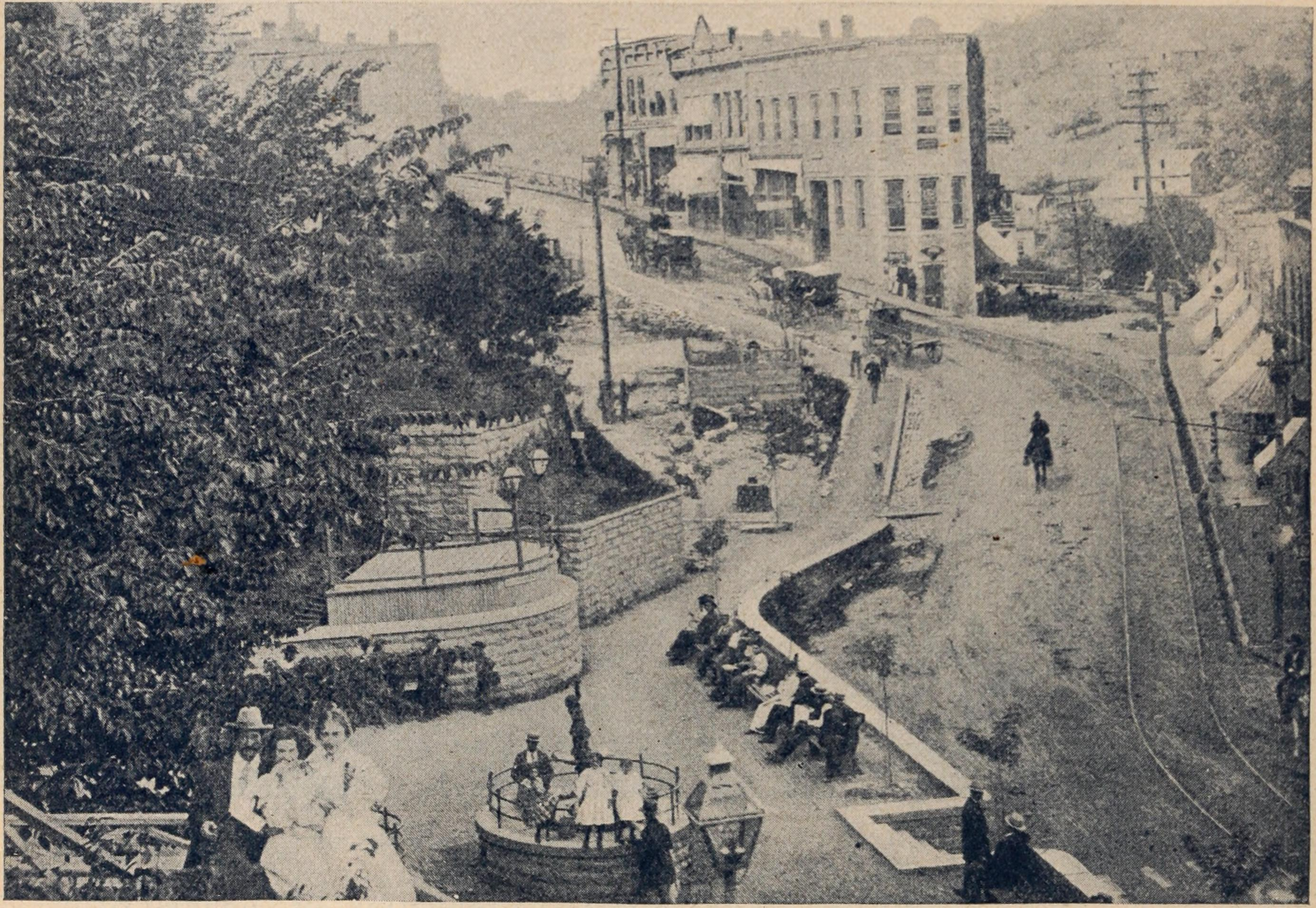
A street in Eureka Springs, c. 1897

By the time of the Louisiana Purchase, the hills and valleys around Eureka Springs were part of the ancestral lands claimed by the historic Osage Nation, which used much of northern Arkansas as hunting territory. Bands of Delaware and Shawnee peoples also lived in the region before federal Indian removal policies that relocated tribes further west.

Although Osage hunting parties likely drank from the springs, there is no historical or archaeological evidence that the Osage or other Native American groups attributed specific medicinal properties to the water. Stories describing Indigenous leaders sharing the water with other tribes or with white settlers circulated among visitors beginning in the late nineteenth century but lack historical documentation.

The Osage ceded northern Arkansas to the United States government in 1825, after which the land was opened to white settlement. Despite this, the Eureka Springs area remained sparsely populated until after the Civil War. European American settlers also came to believe that the springs possessed healing qualities, often describing the water in mystical or medicinal terms. Dr. Alvah Jackson is credited with locating one of the major springs in 1856 and claimed that the water from Basin Spring cured his eye ailments. During the Civil War, Jackson operated a hospital in a local cave and used the spring water to treat patients. After the war, he marketed the water commercially as "Dr. Jackson's Eye Water".

In 1879, Judge J.B. Saunders, an associate of Jackson, asserted that the spring waters cured him of a debilitating illness. Saunders promoted Eureka Springs widely, contributing to rapid population growth. Within slightly more than a year, the area expanded from a rural spa settlement into a rapidly developing town. On February 14, 1880, Eureka Springs was incorporated as a city. Thousands of visitors arrived following Saunders's promotional efforts, temporarily living in tents and makeshift structures. By 1881, Eureka Springs had become Arkansas's fourth-largest city, and by 1889 it ranked second in population behind Little Rock.

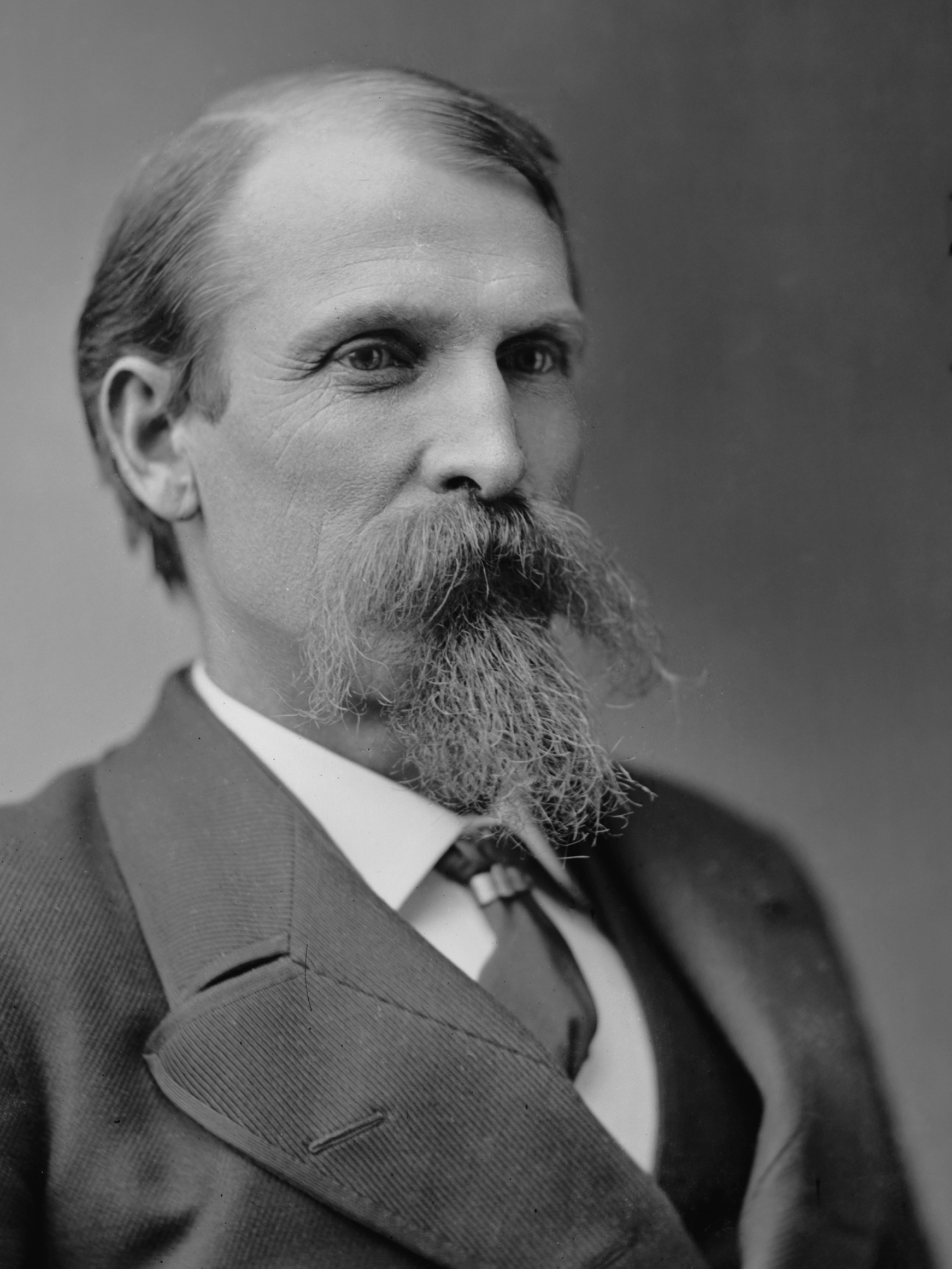
Politician Powell Clayton was an early promoter of Eureka Springs

After serving as a Reconstruction-era governor of Arkansas, Republican Powell Clayton relocated to the strongly Unionist Eureka Springs in 1872. He actively promoted the city as a destination for affluent retirees and investors, helping establish its reputation for leisure, tourism, and upper-class living.

In 1882, the Eureka Improvement Company was formed to attract railroad access. Once rail connections were established, Eureka Springs became more accessible and developed into a regional vacation resort. Thousands of homes and businesses were constructed over the following years. Prominent buildings included the Crescent Hotel (1886), the Basin Park Hotel (1905), and the New Orleans Hotel and Spa (1892), which continues to operate in the 21st century as an all-suite hotel furnished with Victorian-era decor.

Many of the city's Victorian-era buildings remain well preserved, forming a cohesive historic streetscape. While some structures continue to serve their original purposes, others have been adapted for new uses.

Early African-American residents included freedmen who moved to Eureka Springs from surrounding farms where they had previously been enslaved. Some initially arrived seeking employment or medical treatment and later settled permanently. During the era of segregation, Black-owned hotels served African-American visitors, who were barred from whites-only accommodations. The Black community established a school and an African Methodist Episcopal Pilgrim's Chapel in the 1890s. Following the United States Supreme Court decision in Plessy v. Ferguson, segregation intensified, and African Americans were prohibited from accessing all springs except Harding Spring.

=== 20th century ===
==== Early 20th century ====
Water from the springs began to be bottled and distributed beyond the city in the early twentieth century. In 1905, the Ozarka Water Company was established in Eureka Springs, bottling water from Basin Spring under the name Ozarka Brand Natural Spring Water. After the company initially failed, it was purchased by Richard Thompson, a teacher at the Crescent College and Conservatory for Young Women, who operated it into the mid-twentieth century. In 1966, the business was sold to a California company. After 1971, the Ozarka name was owned by a succession of corporations, none of which bottled water in Eureka Springs or elsewhere in the Arkansas Ozarks.

In the same period, tourism began to decline as public belief in the curative powers of the springs diminished. The Basin Park Hotel was constructed in 1905 on the site of the former Perry House. Built into the side of a mountain, its eight floors each open at ground level and the building remains noted for its distinctive architecture. The railroads later relocated their shops to Harrison in Boone County, resulting in job losses, and anticipated economic growth from oil exploration in northern Arkansas did not materialize.

The Crescent Hotel experienced varied uses during this period. From 1908 to 1924, it operated primarily as the Crescent College and Conservatory for Young Women, functioning as a hotel only during the summer months. In the 1930s, it served as a junior college and later as a cancer hospital operated by Norman Baker, who lacked medical training. The hospital closed after Baker was indicted and convicted of mail fraud in 1940. During this era, radio evangelist Gerald L.K. Smith relocated his operations to Eureka Springs, attracted in part by the city's all-white population.

Toward the end of her life, temperance activist Carrie Nation moved to Eureka Springs, where she founded Hatchet Hall on Steele Street. The building later operated as a museum before closing.

==== 1920s to 1930s ====
On September 27, 1922, the only recorded bank robbery in Eureka Springs occurred when five outlaws from Oklahoma attempted to rob the First National Bank. Three of the men were killed and two were wounded. The event is reenacted annually.

Economic decline, racial segregation and discrimination, Klan activity, and the collapse of tourism during World War I contributed to the gradual decline of the African-American community in Eureka Springs during the 1920s and 1930s. The African Methodist Episcopal church disbanded in 1925. Members of the Banks family, descendants of the African-American Fancher family long associated with the city, continued to reside in Eureka Springs until their deaths in 1966, 1969, and 1975, respectively.

==== World War II through the mid-20th century ====
After the Great Depression, a number of artists relocated to Eureka Springs. In 1939, Works Progress Administration artist Louis Freund and his wife, Elsie Freund, established a home in the city and founded a summer art school. Some students remained and opened galleries. Over time, Eureka Springs developed a sustained arts community, including the Eureka Springs Gallery Association, which consists of nine core galleries, and institutions such as the Eureka Springs School of the Arts, the Writers’ Colony at Dairy Hollow, and the Main Stage Creative Community Center.

Opera in the Ozarks at Inspiration Point was founded in 1950 and has continued to present an annual summer opera festival in Eureka Springs.

The African-American community that had developed during the city's earlier tourism boom continued to decline. Local accounts indicate that the two African-American children known to live in Eureka Springs during the 1940s were denied admission to the city's schools. The last known resident of the historic Black community died in 1975.

==== Late 20th century ====
Several developments contributed to the city's revival in the second half of the twentieth century. The establishment of Pea Ridge National Military Park in 1956 and the construction of Beaver Dam and Beaver Lake in the 1960s increased regional tourism. By the city's centennial celebration in 1979, downtown Eureka Springs had been revitalized, with reopened businesses, operating hotels, and new commercial development along Highways 62 and 23.

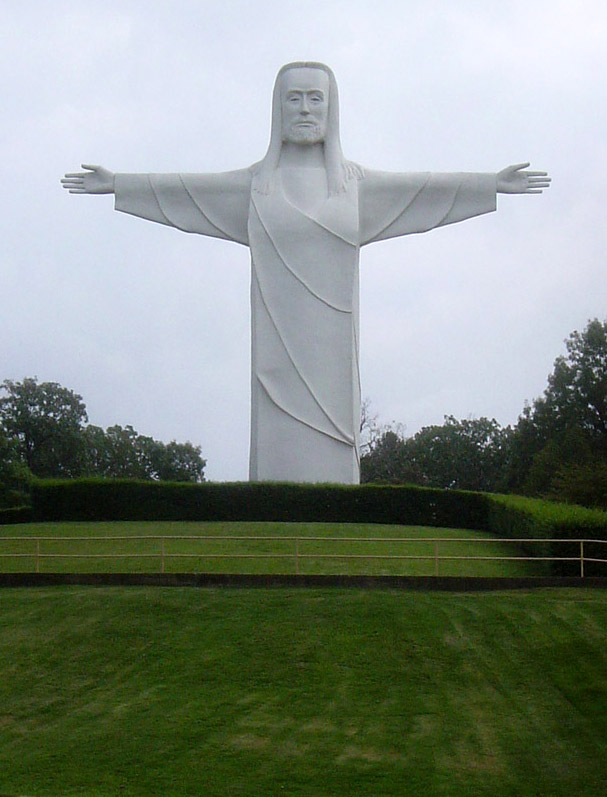
Gerald L.K. Smith's presence led to the creation of the Christ of the Ozarks statue

In 1964, Gerald L.K. Smith initiated construction of a religious theme park known as the Sacred Projects. Although the full vision, including a life-size recreation of Jerusalem, was never completed, two major components became permanent landmarks. On June 25, 1966, Smith dedicated the seven-story Christ of the Ozarks statue, a white concrete figure designed by sculptor Emmet Sullivan and erected on Magnetic Mountain. In 1968, Smith founded The Great Passion Play, an outdoor drama performed from May through October by a cast of approximately 170 actors and numerous live animals. The script was later revised from its original form, which had included a monologue placing blame for Jesus's death on Jewish people. The production has been viewed by an estimated 7.7 million people, making it the largest-attended outdoor drama in the United States, according to the Institute of Outdoor Theatre of the University of East Carolina. Additional Christian-themed attractions were developed nearby, including a Holy Land tour with a full-scale recreation of the Tabernacle in the Wilderness, a section of the Berlin Wall, and a Bible museum housing more than 6,000 Bibles.

Eureka Springs also became a destination for the back-to-the-land movement during the late 1960s and 1970s, attracting hippies, counterculture activists, and lesbian separatists. While initially facing resistance from some residents, increased business activity and tourism led to greater mutual acceptance. The city developed a reputation as a center for LGBT tourism. During the AIDS crisis, community members formed Ozark AIDS Resources and Service to provide mutual aid and care. Eureka Springs experienced particularly severe losses of residents, leaders, and businesses during this period.

Architect E. Fay Jones designed Thorncrown Chapel in 1980. The chapel was listed on the National Register of Historic Places in 2000 and received the Twenty-five Year Award from the American Institute of Architects in 2006, recognizing its long-term influence on architectural practice.

In 1988, the film Pass the Ammo, a satire of televangelism, was filmed in Eureka Springs.

=== 21st century ===
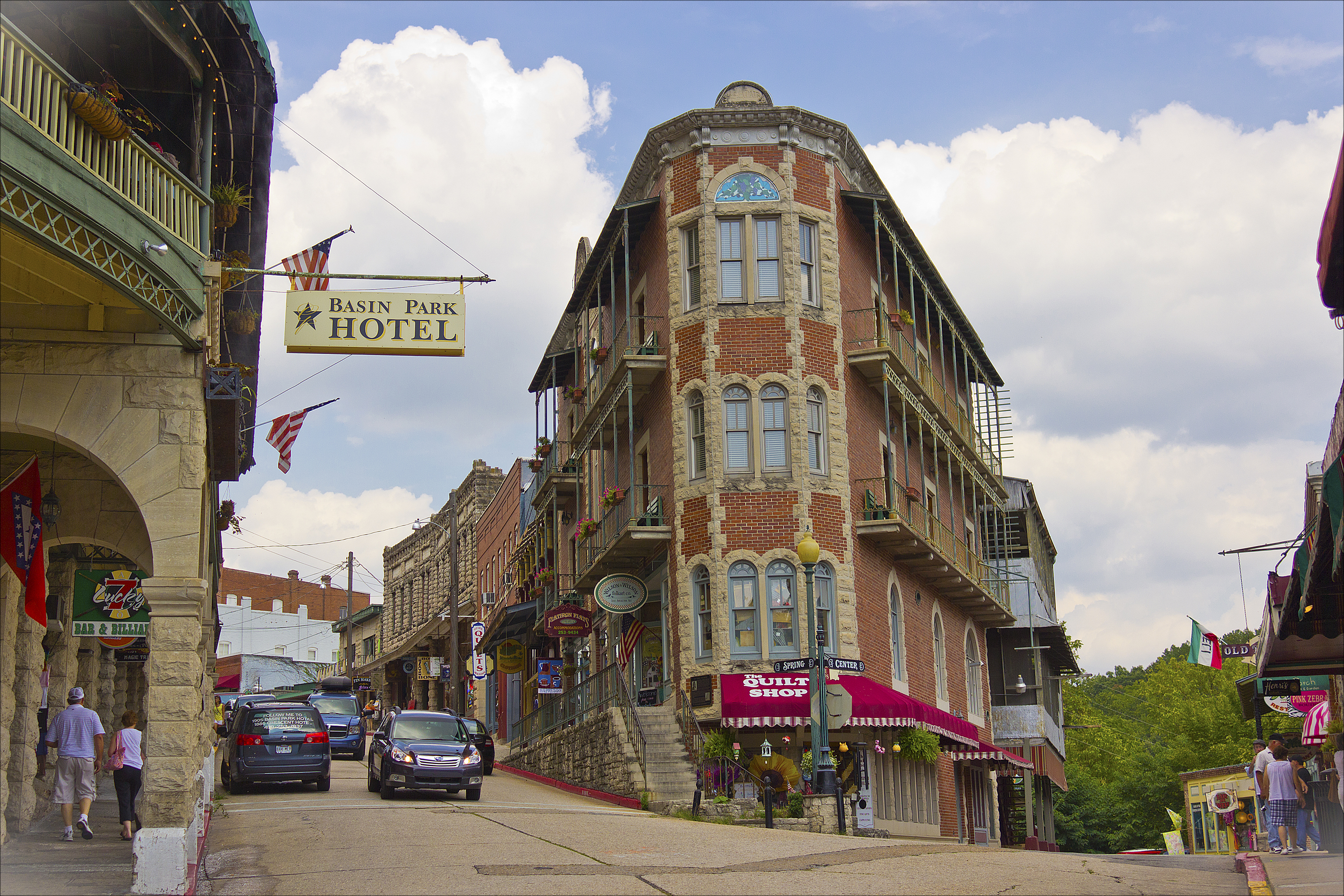
Downtown

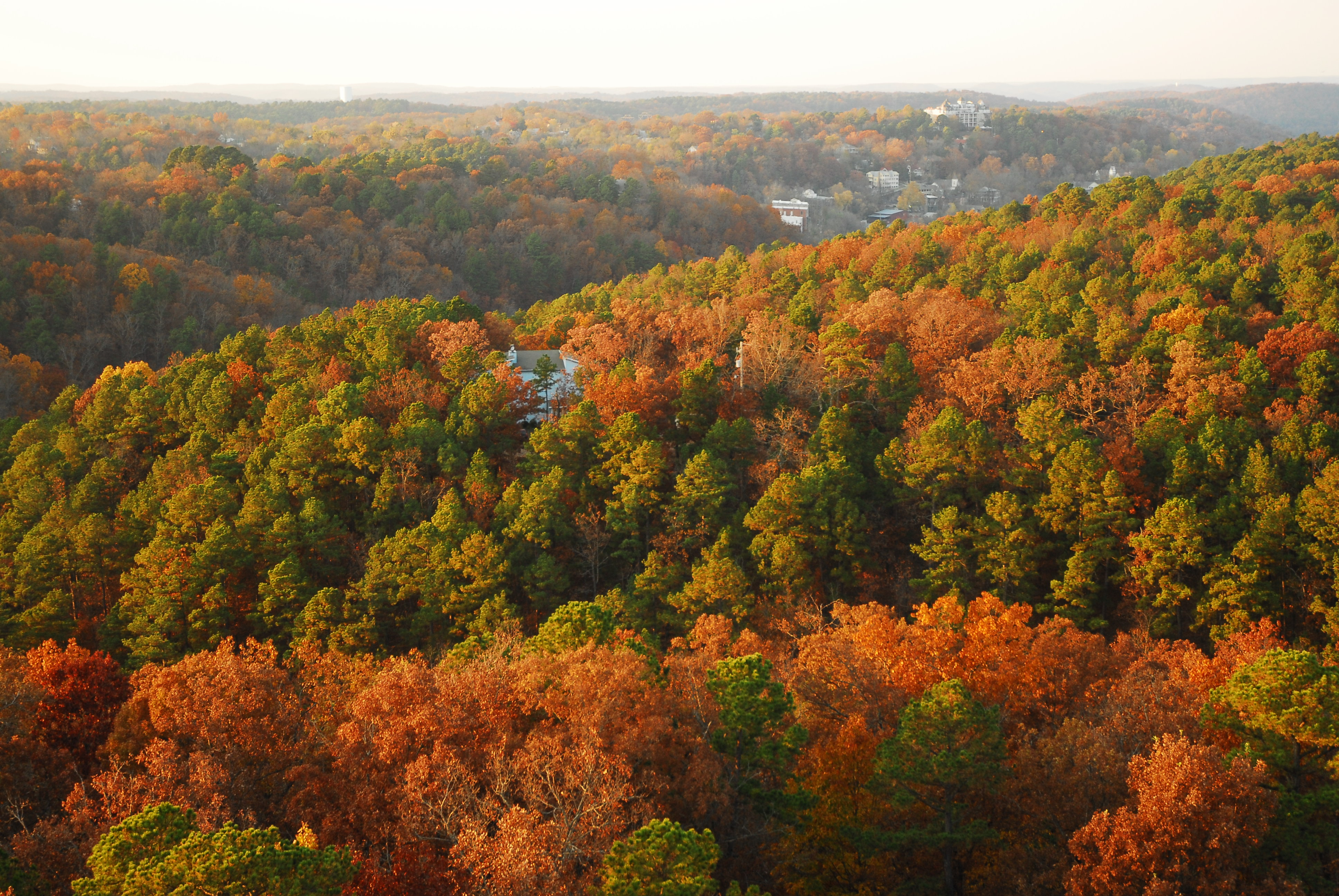
View of Eureka Springs from atop an observation tower; the Crescent Hotel is visible on the horizon (2008)

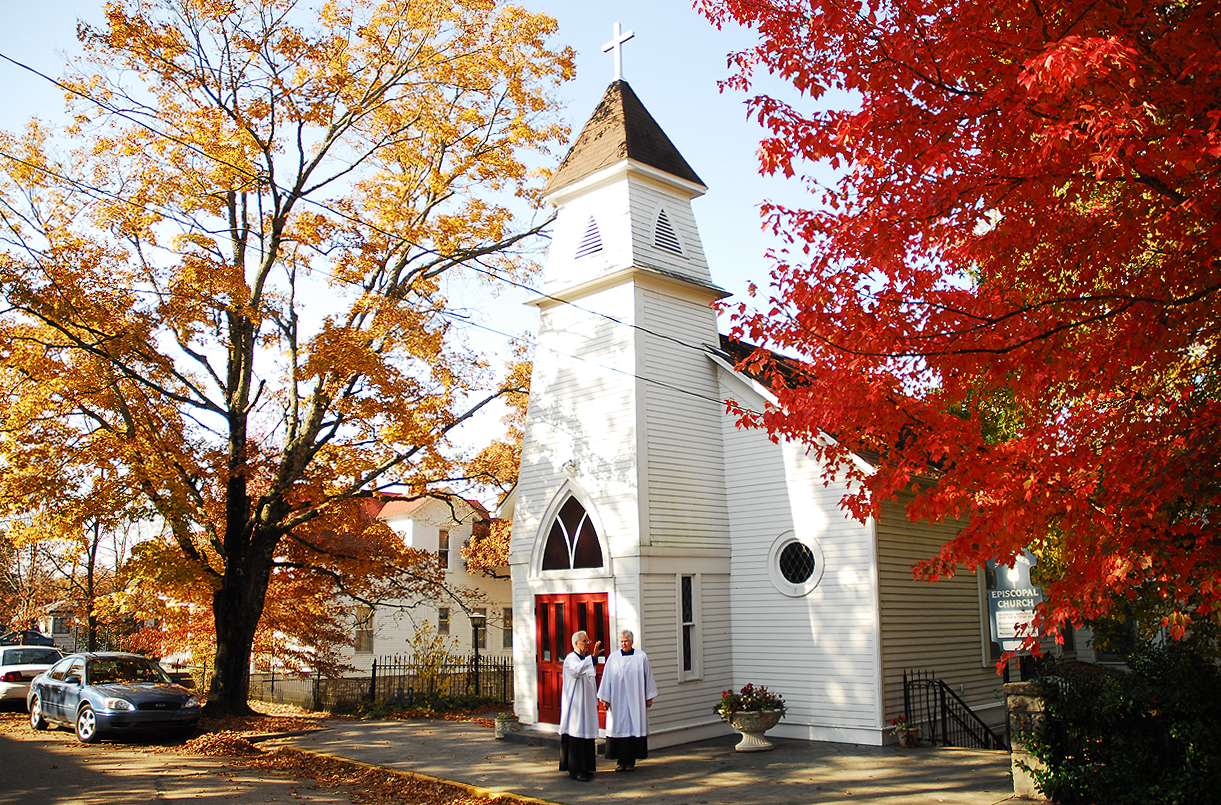
St. James' Episcopal Church

In 2007, the Eureka Springs City Council voted to establish a registry of domestic partnerships. In 2010, Eureka Springs became the only city in Arkansas to offer city employee health insurance coverage to domestic partners.

On May 10, 2014, Eureka Springs became the first city in Arkansas to issue marriage licenses to same-sex couples. On May 12, 2015, voters approved a Non-Discrimination Ordinance (Ordinance 2223) by a margin of 579 to 261. The ordinance prohibited discrimination on the basis of sexual orientation and gender identity and applied to both residents and tourists, making Eureka Springs the first city in the state to enact such protections.

On July 22, 2015, a state law intended to invalidate local civil rights ordinances went into effect. Known as the Intrastate Commerce Improvement Act, the legislation was sponsored by state senator Bart Hester and prohibited municipalities from enacting civil rights protections beyond those provided under state law. In response, the mayor of Eureka Springs stated that the city was prepared to defend its ordinance in court, and local officials maintained that the ordinance remained in effect despite the state law.

Eureka Springs continues to attract a significant gay and lesbian population. The Metropolitan Community Church of the Living Springs conducts commitment ceremonies for same-sex couples. Municipal tourism materials promote the city as a place of tolerance and mutual respect. At the same time, organizations such as the American Family Association have protested the city's acceptance of LGBT residents and visitors.

The coexistence of a visible LGBT nightlife and prominent Christian fundamentalist attractions in the city was examined in the 2018 documentary The Gospel of Eureka.

== Geography ==
Eureka Springs is located in western Carroll County. The center of the city is in a narrow valley at the headwaters of Leatherwood Creek, a north-flowing tributary of the White River. Houses and streets climb both sides of the valley to the surrounding ridgecrests. U.S. Route 62 runs along a ridgecrest through the southern part of the city and leads east 11 miles (18 km) to Berryville and west 34 miles (55 km) to Rogers. Arkansas Highway 23 is Main Street through the center of Eureka Springs and leads north 11 miles (18 km) to the Missouri state line.

The city was founded when the springs at this location were more evident. Over-extraction of water from the springs has greatly diminished their flow rates. All of the more than 140 springs in the town are cold-water springs.

=== Climate ===
The climate in this area is characterized by hot, humid summers and generally mild to cool winters. According to the Köppen Climate Classification system, Eureka Springs has a humid subtropical climate, abbreviated "Cfa" on climate maps.

Climate data for Eureka Springs, Arkansas (1981–2010 normals, extremes 1902–2012)
Month	Jan	Feb	Mar	Apr	May	Jun	Jul	Aug	Sep	Oct	Nov	Dec	Year
Record high °F (°C)	80 (27)	84 (29)	93 (34)	96 (36)	96 (36)	103 (39)	111 (44)	112 (44)	105 (41)	95 (35)	88 (31)	80 (27)	112 (44)
Mean daily maximum °F (°C)	45.8 (7.7)	50.6 (10.3)	60.6 (15.9)	69.9 (21.1)	76.6 (24.8)	83.3 (28.5)	88.5 (31.4)	88.9 (31.6)	80.0 (26.7)	69.8 (21.0)	58.4 (14.7)	47.4 (8.6)	68.3 (20.2)
Daily mean °F (°C)	36.0 (2.2)	40.1 (4.5)	49.3 (9.6)	58.4 (14.7)	66.5 (19.2)	73.7 (23.2)	78.5 (25.8)	78.0 (25.6)	69.6 (20.9)	59.5 (15.3)	48.6 (9.2)	38.1 (3.4)	58.0 (14.4)
Mean daily minimum °F (°C)	26.1 (−3.3)	29.6 (−1.3)	38.0 (3.3)	46.9 (8.3)	56.4 (13.6)	64.1 (17.8)	68.6 (20.3)	67.2 (19.6)	59.3 (15.2)	49.1 (9.5)	38.8 (3.8)	28.7 (−1.8)	47.7 (8.7)
Record low °F (°C)	−17 (−27)	−16 (−27)	−1 (−18)	17 (−8)	29 (−2)	41 (5)	45 (7)	43 (6)	29 (−2)	15 (−9)	5 (−15)	−15 (−26)	−17 (−27)
Average precipitation inches (mm)	2.65 (67)	2.88 (73)	4.40 (112)	4.38 (111)	5.10 (130)	4.31 (109)	3.69 (94)	3.45 (88)	4.62 (117)	3.71 (94)	4.31 (109)	3.43 (87)	46.93 (1,192)
Average snowfall inches (cm)	4.1 (10)	3.9 (9.9)	2.7 (6.9)	0.1 (0.25)	0.0 (0.0)	0.0 (0.0)	0.0 (0.0)	0.0 (0.0)	0.0 (0.0)	0.1 (0.25)	0.3 (0.76)	2.6 (6.6)	13.8 (35)
Average precipitation days (≥ 0.01 in)	7.1	8.0	9.9	10.0	11.9	10.3	8.2	7.4	8.0	8.2	8.4	8.2	105.6
Average snowy days (≥ 0.1 in)	2.5	2.5	0.9	0.0	0.0	0.0	0.0	0.0	0.0	0.0	0.2	2.0	8.1
Source: NOAA

== Demographics ==
Historical population
Census	Pop.	Note	%±
1880	3,984		—
1890	3,706		−7.0%
1900	3,572		−3.6%
1910	3,228		−9.6%
1920	2,429		−24.8%
1930	2,276		−6.3%
1940	1,770		−22.2%
1950	1,958		10.6%
1960	1,437		−26.6%
1970	1,670		16.2%
1980	1,989		19.1%
1990	1,900		−4.5%
2000	2,278		19.9%
2010	2,073		−9.0%
2020	2,166		4.5%
2025 (est.)	2,258	▲	4.2%
U.S. Decennial Census; 2014 Estimate

The Advocate described Eureka Springs as "the gayest small town in America." Over 30% of Eureka Springs residents identify as LGBT.

=== 2020 census ===
As of the 2020 census, Eureka Springs had a population of 2,166. The median age was 55.7 years. 11.4% of residents were under the age of 18 and 32.4% of residents were 65 years of age or older. For every 100 females there were 88.5 males, and for every 100 females age 18 and over there were 87.6 males age 18 and over.

0.0% of residents lived in urban areas, while 100.0% lived in rural areas.

There were 1,153 households in Eureka Springs, of which 14.6% had children under the age of 18 living in them. Of all households, 28.9% were married-couple households, 24.6% were households with a male householder and no spouse or partner present, and 36.9% were households with a female householder and no spouse or partner present. About 46.6% of all households were made up of individuals and 22.6% had someone living alone who was 65 years of age or older.

There were 1,439 housing units, of which 19.9% were vacant. The homeowner vacancy rate was 2.7% and the rental vacancy rate was 6.1%.

Eureka Springs racial composition
Race	Number	Percentage
White (non-Hispanic)	1,833	84.63%
Black or African American (non-Hispanic)	10	0.46%
Native American	33	1.52%
Asian	24	1.11%
Other/Mixed	140	6.46%
Hispanic or Latino	126	5.82%

=== 2000 census ===
As of the census of 2000, there were 2,278 people, 1,119 households, and 569 families residing in the city. The population density was 336.2 inhabitants per square mile (129.8/km^{2}). There were 1,301 housing units at an average density of 192.0 per square mile (74.1/km^{2}). The racial makeup of the city was 93.94% White, 0.04% Black or African American, 0.70% Native American, 0.79% Asian, 0.09% Pacific Islander, 2.28% from other races, and 2.15% from two or more races. 3.99% of the population were Hispanic or Latino of any race.

There were 1,119 households, of which 19.2% had children under the age of 18 living with them, 37.4% were married couples living together, 10.9% had a female householder with no husband present, and 49.1% were classified as non-families by the United States Census Bureau. Of 1,119 households, 250 were unmarried partner households: 50 heterosexual, 110 same-sex male, and 90 same-sex female households. 41.0% of all households were made up of individuals, and 13.4% had someone living alone who was 65 years of age or older. The average household size was 1.97 and the average family size was 2.64.

In the city the population was spread out, with 17.2% under the age of 18, 5.8% from 18 to 24, 24.4% from 25 to 44, 33.4% from 45 to 64, and 19.3% who were 65 years of age or older. The median age was 46 years. For every 100 females, there were 81.8 males. For every 100 females age 18 and over, there were 81.2 males.

The median income for a household in the city was $25,547, and the median income for a family was $40,341. Males had a median income of $27,188 versus $17,161 for females. The per capita income for the city was $18,439. About 4.4% of families and 12.2% of the population were below the poverty line, including 8.7% of those under age 18 and 13.0% of those age 65 or over.

== Arts and culture ==
=== Events ===
Halloween is one of the busiest holidays of the year in Eureka Springs. The weekend before Halloween, the city hosts the annual Eureka Springs Zombie Crawl, one of the largest zombie parades in the country. It's also the home of the Nightmare in the Ozarks Film Festival, which takes place in late October.

The May Festival of the Arts is an annual month-long celebration of the arts in Eureka Springs.

The Eureka Springs Food and Wine Festival is an annual fall event featuring food and wine.

The Eureka Gras Mardi Gras Extravaganza was introduced in 2006, and features a New Orleans-style Mardi Gras celebration, parades, and masquerade balls. King's Day, in January, begins the celebration, which ends on the day of Mardi Gras, in February or March.

There are four annual gay and lesbian events called "Diversity Weekends", and a week long PRIDE celebration in June. The city also holds an annual UFO conference and several auto shows.

=== Points of interest ===
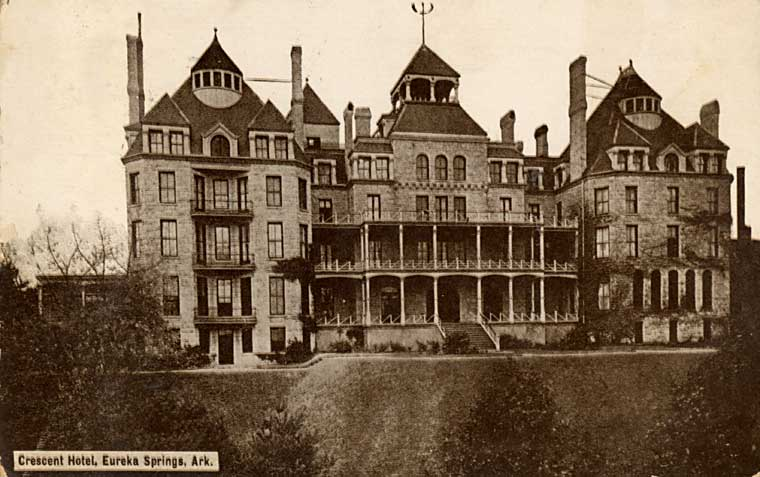
Crescent Hotel, c. 1886

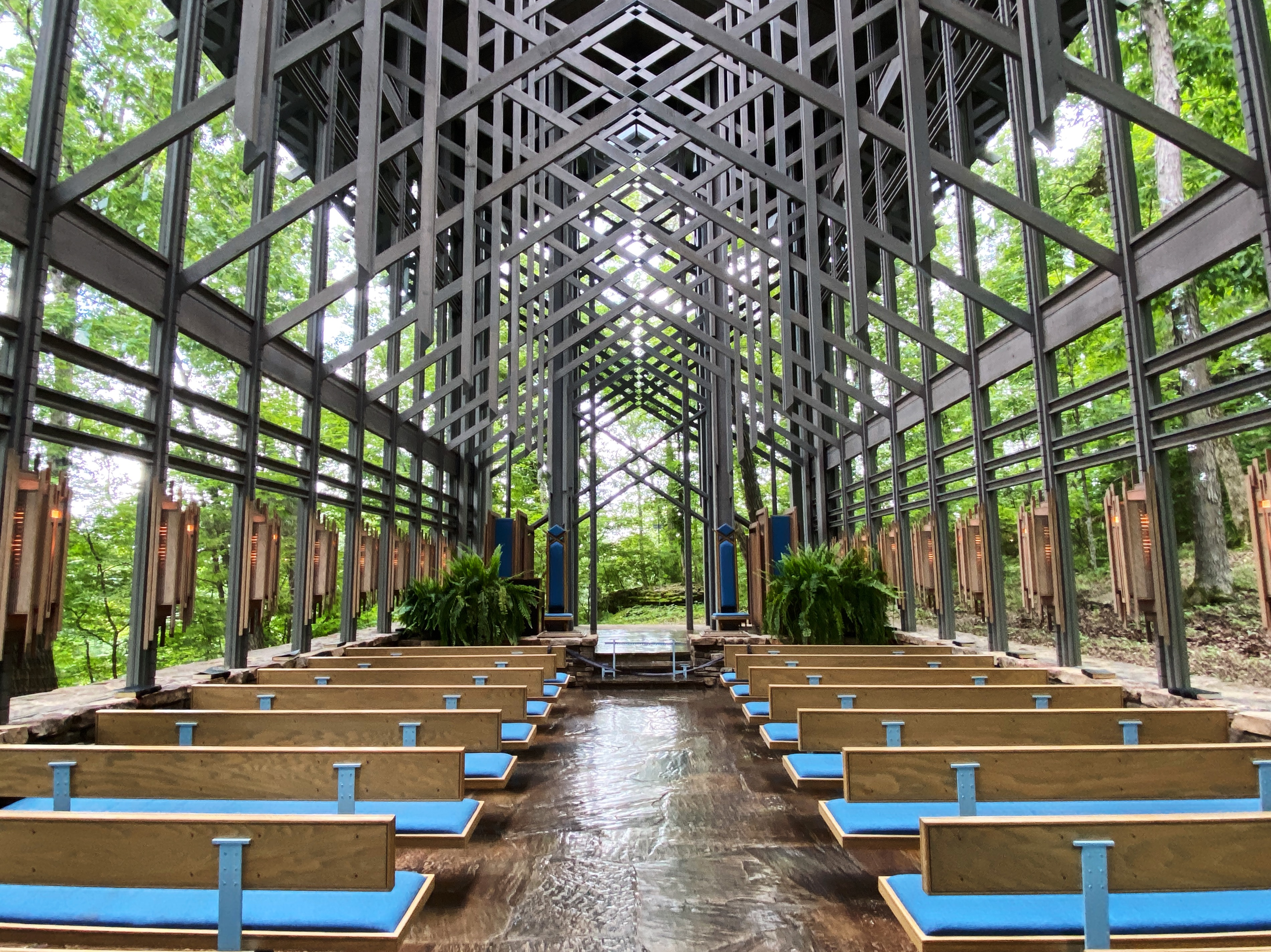
Thorncrown Chapel

- Blue Spring Heritage Center
- Christ of the Ozarks
- Crescent Hotel
- Eureka Springs & North Arkansas Railway
- Lake Leatherwood Park
- Thorncrown Chapel

== Education ==
=== Public education ===
The community is supported by comprehensive public education from the Eureka Springs School District and its facilities:

- Eureka Springs High School (9–12)
- Eureka Springs Middle School (5–8)
- Eureka Springs Elementary School (PK–4)

=== Private education ===
Private school education is provided at:

- Clear Spring School (PK–12)
- The Academy of Excellence (PK–8)

== Media ==
=== Radio and TV ===
For over-the-air television, Eureka Springs is served by the market based out of Springfield, Missouri. For cable, the Springfield affiliates can be received as well as a couple of stations in Fayetteville/Fort Smith as well as all four Little Rock stations. The local radio station is KESA.

=== Newspaper ===
- Carroll County News is published twice weekly, along with regional visitors guides.
- Lovely County Citizen is a tabloid that is distributed free. It publishes the Eureka Springs Visitors Guide.
- ES Independent (established in July 2012) is published in tabloid print format and distributed free.
- Arkansas Democrat-Gazette Northwest Arkansas edition is the only daily newspaper distributed in the area.

=== Filming location ===
The film Pass the Ammo was filmed in the city, with the Auditorium featured in several scenes. There are burn marks still visible on the Auditorium from the film's special effects. The movie Chrystal was filmed in Eureka Springs. Parts of the movie Elizabethtown were filmed in Eureka Springs. The 1982 miniseries The Blue and the Gray was filmed around the area. The SciFi Channel's reality series Ghost Hunters investigated the Crescent Hotel during episode 13 of the second season and found that the claims of ghosts in the hotel are true.

== Infrastructure ==
=== Transportation ===
==== Transit ====
Fixed-route and ADA Paratransit transit service is provided in Eureka Springs by Eureka Springs Transit. There is also intercity bus service is provided by Jefferson Lines in nearby Berryville.

==== Roadways ====
- U.S. Route 62
- Arkansas Highway 23

== Notable people ==
=== Arts and culture ===
- Elsie Bates-Freund, offered the Summer Art School of the Ozarks in Eureka Springs from 1940 to 1951, and lived in the city for part of the year for the rest of her life
- Candace Camp, schoolteacher in Eureka Springs before becoming a romance novelist
- Irene Castle, silent film actress and ballroom dancer; spent her last years in Eureka Springs
- Frances Currey, folk art painter, spent her final years in a nursing home in Eureka Springs
- Crescent Dragonwagon, co-founded the Writers' Colony at Dairy Hollow; lived in Eureka Springs for a number of years
- Glenn Gant, painter; resided much of his life in Eureka Springs
- Emme Gerhard, photographer; lived in Eureka Springs for a time
- Charles Christian Hammer classical guitarist; spent much of his life in Eureka Springs
- Julius Hegyi served on the faculty of the Inspiration Point Fine Arts Colony as conductor and violinist from 1951 to 1956
- Ben Kynard, jazz saxophonist; born in Eureka Springs
- Byrd Mock, writer and publisher; retired to Eureka Springs in 1956
- Rachel Beasley Ray, poet and author; lived in Eureka Springs for much of her life
- Ned Shank, co-founded the Writers' Colony at Dairy Hollow, lived in Eureka Springs for a number of years
- Marla Shelton, 1930s and 1940s film actress was born in Eureka Springs
- Jonathan Stalling, poet, Chinese literature expert; was raised in Eureka Springs
- Frank Stanford, poet, briefly lived in Eureka Springs

=== Business and politics ===
- Norman G. Baker, charlatan, ran a hospital that led to his conviction for mail fraud
- Powell Clayton, former Governor Arkansas, U.S. Senator, and later Ambassador to Mexico, was a prominent citizen and businessman in the 1880s and 1890s
- Claude A. Fuller, Arkansas and member of the United States House of Representatives, lived most of his life in, and was twice Mayor of, Eureka Springs
- Lizzie Dorman Fyler, women's rights activist, founded the Arkansas Woman Suffrage Association in 1881 while living in Eureka Springs
- Joseph Morrison Hill opened his first law practice in Eureka Springs and was later Chief Justice of the Arkansas Supreme Court
- Festus Orestes Butt, member of the Arkansas Senate, Arkansas House of Representatives, and Mayor of Eureka Springs.

=== Military ===
- Marcellus H. Chiles, United States Army Captain, Medal of Honor recipient, was born in Eureka Springs

=== Education ===
- Mary Carson Breckinridge, Frontier Nursing Service founder, taught at Crescent College and Conservatory while living in Eureka Springs

=== Religion ===
- William Evander Penn, Baptist minister, made his home in Eureka Springs in Penn Castle
- Gerald L. K. Smith, clergyman and populist political organizer retired to Eureka Springs, where he commissioned the Christ of the Ozarks

=== Sports ===
- Pat Burrell, Major League Baseball player, was born in Eureka Springs

== In popular culture ==
- The first episode of The Beverly Hillbillies includes the line "Jed, remember the time that your pa took us to Eureka Springs to see the movie picture?"
- The 2018 documentary The Gospel of Eureka depicts the town and its unique culture, including the synergy of its religious and LGBTQ milieus.
