= Chinese Literature Today =

- 2018 Vol. 7 No. 2
- Discipline: Contemporary Chinese Literature
- Language: English
- Edited by: Guo Changbao (Editor in Chief), Liu Hongtao (Deputy Editor in Chief), and Ping Zhu (Deputy Editor in Chief)

Publication details
- History: 2010-present
- Publisher: Routledge (United States)
- Frequency: Biannual

Standard abbreviations
- ISO 4: Chin. Lit. Today

Indexing
- ISSN: 2151-4399 (print); 2156-8634 (web)

Links
- Journal homepage

Chinese Literature Today (CLT) is a biannual Chinese literature and culture journal jointly hosted and edited by Beijing Normal University and the University of Oklahoma, and produced and published by Routledge. Launched in summer 2010, CLT is an offshoot of the award-winning magazine World Literature Today. This cross-culture cooperation has also produced a translated book series on contemporary Chinese literature.

Its CiteScore in 2023 was 0.1, ranked 949th out of 1106 journals in Literature and Literary Theory.
