= William Evander Penn =

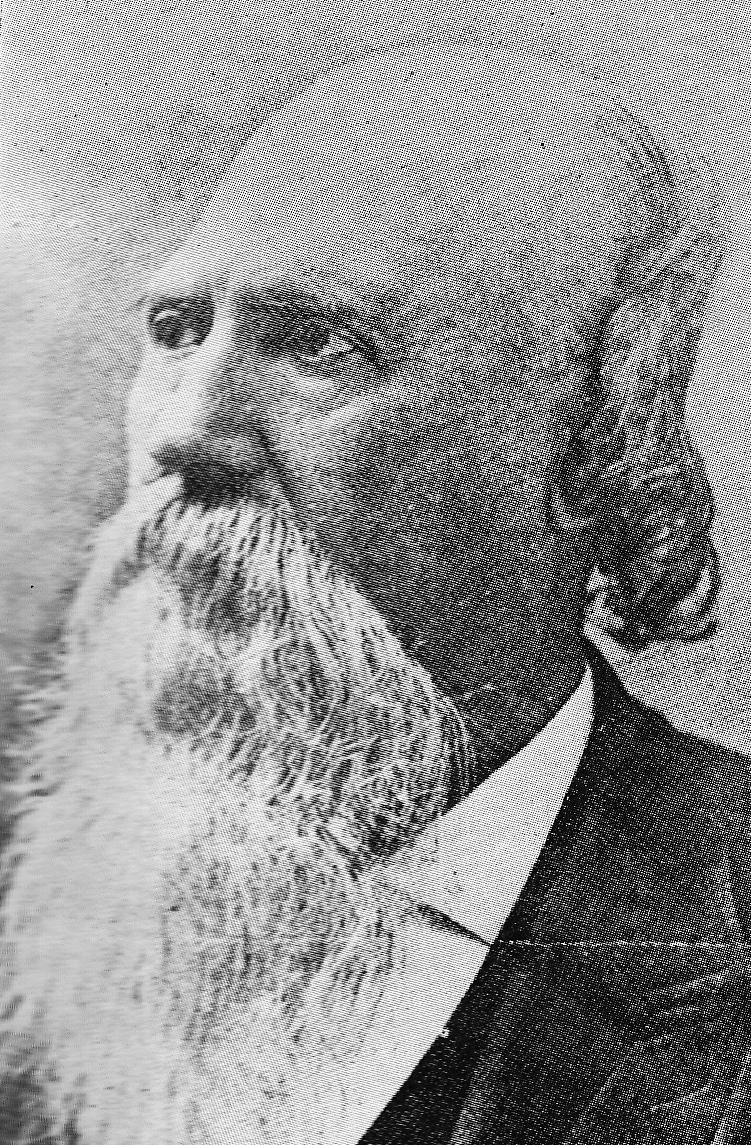
Major W.E. Penn

Major William Evander Penn (1832–1895) was a Texas Baptist evangelist and well known minister who preached widely in America and Europe. His visit of castles in Europe inspired him to build a castle of his own in 1888 where he and his wife Corrilla Frances Sayles Penn lived for several years. "Penn Castle" still stands in Eureka Springs, Arkansas and was featured on the HGTV show If Walls Could Talk. The First Baptist Penn Memorial Church of Eureka Springs was named in his honor. He authored an enduring hymn, The Sheltering Rock
