= Eureka Springs High School =

Location
- 2 Lake Lucerne Road; Eureka Springs, Arkansas 72632; United States
- Coordinates: 36°23′54″N 93°44′46″W

Information
- Type: Comprehensive public
- Opened: 1951 (75 years ago)
- School district: Eureka Springs School District
- Authority: Arkansas Department of Education (ADE)
- CEEB code: 040750
- NCES School ID: 050597000306
- Teaching staff: 20.02 (on FTE basis)
- Enrollment: 220 (2023-2024)
- Education system: ADE Smart Core curriculum
- Colors: Red, white, and black
- Athletics conference: 2A Region 4 (2012–14)
- Mascot: Highlander
- Nickname: Hustlin' Highlanders
- Team name: Eureka Springs Highlanders
- Accreditation: ADE
- Affiliation: National Wildlife Federation ECO Schools program
- Website: www.eurekaspringsschools.k12.ar.us/o/eshs

Eureka Springs High School is a public secondary school for students in grades nine through twelve located in Eureka Springs, Arkansas, United States. It is one of three public high schools located in Carroll County and the sole high school administered by the Eureka Springs School District.

== History ==
The Eureka Springs School District has funded the construction of a new high school facility that opened in January 2013.

== Academics ==
The assumed course of study for students follows the Smart Core curriculum developed by the Arkansas Department of Education (ADE), which requires students to obtain at least 22 units before graduation. Students are required to have an additional 3 units for a total of 25 to graduation from Eureka Springs. Students complete regular and career focus courses (medical, engineering, construction technology, business, film and hospitality) and may select Advanced Placement (AP) coursework and exams. The school is accredited by the ADE.

Eureka Springs High School is a member of the EAST Initiative and the National Wildlife Federation ECO Schools program. For the years 2013, 2014, 2015, Eureka Springs High School has by ranked as one of the top ten high schools in Arkansas according to the Best High Schools report by U.S. News & World Report.

== Extracurricular activities ==
The Eureka Springs High School mascot is the Highlander with the school colors of red, white, and black.

For 2012–20, Eureka Springs Highlanders compete in the 2A 4 West (basketball) Conference administered by the Arkansas Activities Association. The Highlanders compete in basketball (boy/girls), softball, cross country (boys/girls), golf (boys/girls), track (boys/girls), volleyball, and girls and boys soccer.

- Cross country: the Highlanders are one of the state's most successful programs with the boys team winning 11 state titles including a 10-year winning streak (1986, 1987, 1988, 1989, 1990, 1991, 1992, 1993, 1994, 1995, 1999) and the girls are 4-time state champions (1989, 1991, 1992, 1996)
- Boys basketball: conference champs 2014, 2017, 2019. District champs 2015, 2016, 2019. Regional champs 2019 coached by Brian Rambo.
