= Eureka Springs School District =

School district in Arkansas

District information
- Grades: PK–12
- NCES District ID: 050970

Students and staff
- Students: 659
- Teachers: 60.00
- Student–teacher ratio: 11.48
- Colors: Red, Black and White

Other information
- Website: eurekaspringsschools.k12.ar.us

Eureka Springs School District is a public school district located in Eureka Springs, Arkansas, United States.

== Schools ==
The Eureka Springs School District provides education programs at three educational facilities:

- Eureka Springs High School—Serving high school students in grades 9–12.
- Eureka Springs Middle School—Serving middle school students in grades 5–8.
- Eureka Springs Elementary School—Serving elementary school students in grades PreKindergarten–4.
