= Green Forest, Arkansas =

- City
- Location of Green Forest in Carroll County, Arkansas.
- Coordinates: 36°20′05″N 93°25′51″W
- Country: United States
- State: Arkansas
- County: Carroll

Government
  - Mayor: Jerry Carlton

Area
  - Total: 2.46 sq mi (6.38 km^{2})
  - Land: 2.46 sq mi (6.38 km^{2})
  - Water: 0 sq mi (0.00 km^{2})
- Elevation: 1,335 ft (407 m)

Population (2020)
  - Total: 2,972
  - Estimate (2025): 3,246 ▲
  - Density: 1,205.9/sq mi (465.59/km^{2})
- Time zone: UTC-6 (Central (CST))
  - Summer (DST): UTC-5 (CDT)
- ZIP code: 72638
- Area code: [[Area code 870
- FIPS code: 05-28600
- GNIS feature ID: 2403736
- Website: greenforestar.net

Green Forest is a city in Carroll County, Arkansas, United States. The population was 2,972 at the 2020 census.

== Geography ==
According to the United States Census Bureau, the city has a total area of 5.9 km^{2} (2.3 mi^{2}), all land.

== Demographics ==
Historical population
Census	Pop.	Note	%±
1880	34		—
1900	469		—
1910	635		35.4%
1920	868		36.7%
1930	745		−14.2%
1940	755		1.3%
1950	738		−2.3%
1960	1,038		40.7%
1970	1,354		30.4%
1980	1,609		18.8%
1990	2,050		27.4%
2000	2,717		32.5%
2010	2,761		1.6%
2020	2,972		7.6%
2025 (est.)	3,246	▲	9.2%
U.S. Decennial Census

=== 2020 census ===
Green Forest racial composition
Race	Number	Percentage
White (non-Hispanic)	1,218	40.98%
Black or African American (non-Hispanic)	8	0.27%
Native American	12	0.4%
Asian	333	11.2%
Pacific Islander	73	2.46%
Other/Mixed	115	3.87%
Hispanic or Latino	1,213	40.81%

As of the 2020 census, Green Forest had a population of 2,972. The median age was 32.9 years. 30.2% of residents were under the age of 18 and 11.3% of residents were 65 years of age or older. For every 100 females there were 100.5 males, and for every 100 females age 18 and over there were 97.2 males age 18 and over.

0.0% of residents lived in urban areas, while 100.0% lived in rural areas.

There were 1,017 households and 651 families in the city. Of all households, 40.2% had children under the age of 18 living in them. 44.1% were married-couple households, 20.6% were households with a male householder and no spouse or partner present, and 28.8% were households with a female householder and no spouse or partner present. About 29.0% of all households were made up of individuals, and 11.9% had someone living alone who was 65 years of age or older.

There were 1,122 housing units, of which 9.4% were vacant. The homeowner vacancy rate was 1.4% and the rental vacancy rate was 9.2%.

=== 2010 census ===
At the 2010 census there were 3,271 people, 1072 households, and 977 families living in the city. The population density was 458.1/km^{2} (1,187.4/mi^{2}). There were 1,146 housing units at an average density of 176.4/km^{2} (457.1/mi^{2}). The racial makeup of the city was 64.3% White, 0.40% Black or African American, 1.07% Native American, 0.48% Asian, 0.37% Pacific Islander, 12.37% from other races, and 2.76% from two or more races. 33.20% of the population were Hispanic or Latino of any race. Of the 1072 households 37.4% had children under the age of 18 living with them, 51.9% were married couples living together, 13.1% had a female householder with no husband present, and 30.2% were non-families. 23.2% of households were one person and 11.2% were one person aged 65 or older. The average household size was 2.82 and the average family size was 3.27.

The age distribution was 28.6% under the age of 18, 12.7% from 18 to 24, 30.8% from 25 to 44, 15.8% from 45 to 64, and 12.1% 65 or older. The median age was 30 years. For every 100 females, there were 96.9 males. For every 100 females age 18 and over, there were 96.0 males.

The median household income was $23,750 and the median family income was $26,765. Males had a median income of $18,886 versus $16,686 for females. The per capita income for the city was $10,720. About 16.7% of families and 22.1% of the population were below the poverty line, including 23.7% of those under age 18 and 23.5% of those age 65 or over.

== Education ==
=== Public education ===
Elementary and secondary school students may attend Green Forest School District which includes all three of the Green Forest Elementary School, Green Forest Intermediate School, and Green Forest Middle School, consecutively, which leads to graduation from Green Forest High School.

=== Public libraries ===
The Green Forest Public Library is a branch library of the Carroll And Madison Library System. The library opened in 1935.

== Transportation ==
=== Roadways ===
- U.S. Highway 62
- Arkansas Highway 103
- Arkansas Highway 311

=== Transit ===
- Jefferson Lines

== Notable people ==
- Helen Gurley Brown was born in Green Forest.
- David Crockett Graham was born in Green Forest.
- Bart Hester was born in Green Forest.

== Early history ==
The first known settler in the area was John Scott, “a maker of sheep and cowbells,” who was also briefly the postmaster and named the town Scott's Prairie after himself. First Baptist Church was built from logs in 1854 and was the local school. The Methodist Church opened in 1857.

In June 1861, up to 5,000 Confederate soldiers led by Brig. Gen. James H. McBride set up camp in and around town, prompting Yankees in November 1863 under Maj. Austin A. King to burn the town to the ground. However, the Skirmish of Yocum Creek resulted in the only known casualties between Southern defenders and a Union patrol evacuating northern sympathizers, who were not exactly popular after the Yankees burned down Berryville, too.

The town was rebuilt and a new post office opened in 1867 with John Grim as postmaster. When clearing land on his farm, Grim had left a grove of shade trees untouched, which his neighbors dubbed “Green Forest”—or according to some accounts "Grim's Forest."

By 1889 the town had a cotton gin operated by J. R. Hanby. The Green Forest Tribune began publication in 1889. A three-story school was built in 1893, replacing an earlier thirty-by-twenty-five-foot schoolhouse.

After Eureka Springs succeeded in dividing the county into two judicial districts, claiming the western district as its own, Green Forest proposed becoming the county seat for the eastern district, but was outvoted by larger Berryville.

In 1901, the St. Louis and North Arkansas Railroad built a rail line connecting Eureka Springs to Harrison. Stores and businesses sprang up around the Green Forest railroad depot. On September 20, 1902, a fire destroyed several businesses around the depot, including the Stone Hotel, Dr. Morrow’s Drug Store, W. L. Crow’s Store, and the printing offices of Crow & Pyron.

A new school building was erected in 1905, costing $5,000 to construct and $900 to furnish. The school was never used, though, as it was destroyed by fire on August 8, 1905. Another new school was quickly built, financed by 70 property owners who pledged two dollars for every $100 of property they owned, according to the Carroll County assessments.

Around that time, traveling preacher Lester Sumrall held a six-week revival. It was interrupted by an angry farmer in the middle of the sermon one night, who called out a neighbor who'd been cavorting with the farmer’s wife. The farmer shot the neighbor dead in front of the congregation. According to Sumrall's autobiography, the altar call drew quite a response that night, resulting in the founding of today's First Assembly of God.

In 1906, Willis Wood and Will Huttig of Kansas City along with engineer E. S. W. Drought and government assayer H. S. Mohun, drilled a 140-foot well and reported finding gold. Prospective investors hurried to profit, but it turned out the drillers were crooks—no gold.

By 1927, the town's businesses included the First National Bank of Green Forest, chartered in 1901, several grocery stores, a marble and granite works, a wood milling company, a blacksmith, a hardware company, a tomato cannery, a telephone company, a bakery, a feed mill and a car dealership in what had been the Hanby cotton gin. It later became Tanner’s Hardware, the Country Rooster Cafe and now is Grace Baptist Church on the Square.

Most of the businesses around the train depot were destroyed along with the town of Denver in a 1927 tornado. Main Street survived, but the business district around the depot was devastated and not rebuilt. Denver, Arkansas, never recovered. The destroyed Green Forest train station was patched together with the old depot at Urbanette.

Today's restored Green Forest train station next to the soccer and baseball fields at the city park still has Urbanette markings on the big cargo door.

The public library opened in 1935.

Green Forest is the birthplace and childhood home of the late Cosmopolitan magazine publisher Helen Gurley Brown. It is also the birthplace of Baptist missionary David Crockett Graham, who also studied Chinese culture as an anthropologist.
