= Clear Spring School =

Location
- 374 Dairy Hollow Road; Eureka Springs, Arkansas 72632; United States; 36°24′30″N 93°44′43″W

Information
- Funding type: Independent, co-educational
- Founded: 1974 (52 years ago)
- Founder: Will and Laurie Fulton and Molly Fulton Seeligson
- NCES School ID: A9100177
- Head of school: Debbie Hartsell
- Teaching staff: 8.8 (on FTE basis)
- Grades: PK–12
- Gender: Co-educational
- Enrollment: 59 (2009–10)
- Student to teacher ratio: 6.1
- Accreditation: Independent School Association of the Central States (ISACS) [1999–] National Association of Independent Schools (NAIS)
- Publication: The Independent Mind
- Website: www.clearspringschool.org

Clear Spring School is an independent, co-educational school in Eureka Springs, United States. The school teaches approximately sixty students in prekindergarten through grade 12.

== History ==
Clear Spring School was founded in 1974 by Will and Laurie Fulton and Molly Fulton Seeligson. Will and Molly’s father, Dr. Bernard Fulton, had previously founded the Greenhill School in Dallas, Texas. The vision of Clear Spring School, following the founders’ philosophy of true education, was to promote a lifelong love of learning. They recognized that when students make a personal and meaningful connection with a subject, then knowledge, skill, and growth naturally follow.

Beginning as a one-room school for students in grades 1 – 6, Clear Spring School gradually expanded to serve pre-primary students and later added a middle school and then high school program. Over the school’s early years, it was housed in four different donated spaces as the program grew, including Eureka Springs’ historic “Old Red Brick School House” (later destroyed by fire in 1990). With the school’s growth came the acquisition of 16 wooded acres, and a master plan that resulted in the construction of five buildings housing classrooms and administrative offices.

Clear Spring School has been nationally accredited through the Independent School Association of the Central States (ISACS) since 1999. In addition to ISACS accreditation, CSS is also a member of the National Association of Independent Schools (NAIS).

Clear Spring School is divided into the following programs:

- Pre-Primary Program—prekindergarten (PK) and kindergarten (KG)
- Ełementary School—two classrooms divided into grades 1–3 and grades 4–5.
- Middle School—grades 6 through 8 on a block schedule.
- High School—grades 9 through 12 on a block schedule.
