= Wai-lim Yip =

Taiwanese poet, translator, critic, editor and professor

Wai-lim Yip (Chinese: 葉維廉; Jyutping: Jip6 Wai4-lim4, pinyin: Yè Wéilián; born June 20, 1937), is a Taiwanese poet, translator, critic, editor, and professor of Chinese and comparative literature at UC San Diego. He received his PhD in comparative literature from Princeton University. He is also a visiting teacher at China's Peking University and Tsinghua University.

== Life ==
Yip was born in Guangdong province. At the age of 12, he moved to Hong Kong, where he started writing poetry and was active on the poetry scene. He graduated from National Taiwan University (BA, 1959) and went on to National Taiwan Normal University (MA, 1961), where he did a thesis on T.S. Eliot and translated "The Waste Land."

In 1963 he went to the United States to attend the Iowa Writers' Workshop at the University of Iowa, whose director, Paul Engle, went to Taipei to negotiate permission for Yip's wife Tzu-mei and their daughter to leave Taiwan; he received an MFA in 1964. He then did graduate work at Princeton University, receiving a PhD in comparative literature in 1967. In the same year he joined the faculty of University of California, San Diego, with which he has been affiliated ever since.

In 1970 he returned to National Taiwan University as a visiting professor of comparative literature. In 1980 he joined the Department of English at the Chinese University of Hong Kong as a visiting professor. Since then, he has visited mainland China many times, teaching comparative literature at Peking University and Tsinghua University.

Yip's poetic theory, relating modernist poetry to Taoist aesthetics, has been very influential in Taiwan. In recent years he has been the object of considerable attention in China, with exhibitions of his archives and conferences devoted to his poetry, as well as publication of his Complete Works in nine volumes.

== Works ==
- Ezra Pound's Cathay, Princeton University Press, 1969.
- Modern Chinese Poetry: Twenty Poets from the Republic of China, 1955-65, University of Iowa Press, 1970.
- Chinese Poetry: Major Modes and Genres, U. C. Press/Duke University Press, 1976; Chinese Poetry: Major Modes and Genres (2nd ed.). Duke University Press. 1997 – via Internet Archive.
- Reading the Modern and the Postmodern: Meditations on Living Spaces and Cultural Spaces, Taipei: Tatung, 1992.
- Diffusion of Distances: Dialogues Between Chinese and Western Poetics, University of California Press, 1993. (UC Press E-Books)
- Between Landscapes, Santa Fe: Pennywhistle Press, 1994 [poems in English].
- Between/Entre, New Native Press, 2008 [trilingual collection of Yip's poetry].
- Translation of a poem by Chen Lin (Han dynasty) called "Water the Horses at a Breach in the Great Wall".
